= Lenin's First and Second Government =

Heads of Soviet ministries

Lenin Government
- 12th Cabinet of Russia (as Russian SFSR)

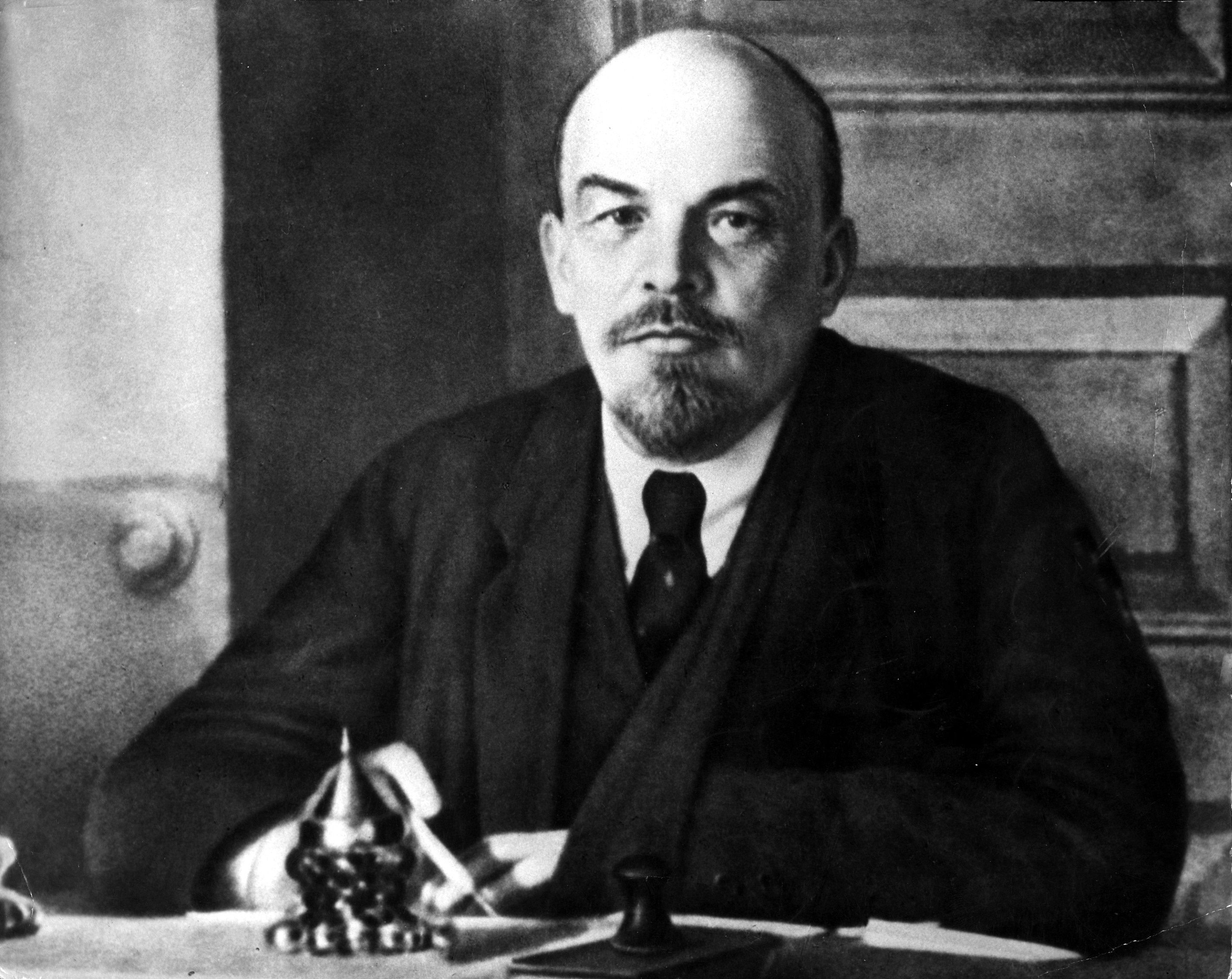
- Date formed: 8 November 1917
- Date dissolved: 21 January 1924

People and organisations
- Head of government: Vladimir Lenin
- Member parties: Bolsheviks; Left Socialist-Revolutionaries (1917–1918)
- Status in legislature: Majority (1917–1921); Sole legal party (from 1921)
- Opposition cabinet: Komuch (1918); Ufa Directory (1918); Omsk Government (1918–1920); Priamurye Government (1921–1923)
- Opposition parties: Socialist-Revolutionaries (1917–1921); Mensheviks (1917–1921); Left Socialist-Revolutionaries (1918–1921)

History
- Incoming formation: Alexander Kerensky's Second Cabinet
- Outgoing formation: Alexei Rykov's Cabinet
- Predecessor: Alexander Kerensky
- Successor: Alexei Rykov

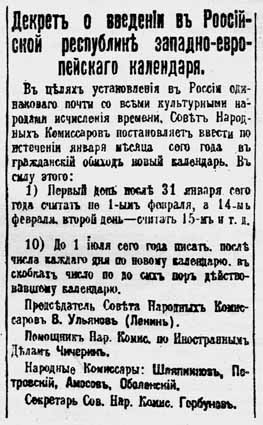
An early Sovnarkom decree, introducing the "Western European calendar" in Russia. The decree prescribed that 14 February, 1918 (New style) would immediately follow 31 January, 1918 (Old style)

Following the October Revolution, Vladimir Lenin became the head of the new government of the Russian Socialist Federative Soviet Republic. It was known officially as the Council of People's Commissars, effectively his cabinet. Twelve of the council's twenty nine members would later be killed during Joseph Stalin's Great Purge.

== Council of People's Commissars ==
The Council of People's Commissars of the RSFSR (Russian: Совет народных комиссаров РСФСР) was the governmental cabinet of the Russian Soviet Federative Socialist Republic (RSFSR) from 1917 through 1946. That year it was renamed the Council of Ministers of the RSFSR. Following the Declaration of the Creation of the USSR in 1922, state powers of this institution of the RSFSR were somewhat superseded by the Council of People's Commissars of the USSR.

By September 1917, the councils (soviets) of workers, peasants and soldiers acquired considerable political and military power. The leaders of the Petrograd Soviet conspired to overthrow the Russian Provisional Government; the uprising started on 7 November 1917, when Red Guards units captured the Winter Palace. On the next day, 8 November 1917, the Second All-Russian Congress of Soviets recognized the success of the uprising, and formally established the new government, reflecting the capture of the soviets by the Bolsheviks.

The government was formally called the Council of People's Commissars (Совет народных коммиссаров), abbreviated as Sovnarkom (Совнарком). Leon Trotsky devised the council and commissar names, thereby avoiding the more "bourgeois" terms of minister and cabinet.

The People's Commissars (Russian: Народный комиссар, translit.: Narodny komissar, or Narkom) functioned as government ministers. A ministry was called a People's Commissariat (Russian: Народный комиссариат, translit.: Narodny komissariat, abbreviated to narkomat).

=== Formation ===
Traditionally, the executive part of a government is directed by a council of ministers nominated by a ruler or by a president. The Bolsheviks considered this to be a bourgeois institution, and wanted to create what they believed was a new government made up of a 'soviet' of workers and peasants.

The role and structure of the Sovnarkom was formalized in the 1918 Constitution of the RSFSR. The Sovnarkom of the RSFSR was responsible to the Congress of Soviets for the "general administration of the affairs of the state". The constitution enabled the Sovnarkom to issue decrees carrying the full force of law when the Congress was not in session. The Congress would routinely approve these decrees at its next session.

Each People's Commissar was head of commissariat and had several deputies and a collegium, which functioned as a deliberative body to advise the commissar.

The Chairman of the Council of People's Commissars, also elected by the Congress, had a function similar to that of a prime minister. The first Chairman of the Sovnarkom was Vladimir Lenin.

=== First People's Commissars ===
The first council elected by the Second All-Russian congress was composed by the following 29 members. Eleven of the men were executed during the late 1930s, a time of the Great Purge by Joseph Stalin, then General Secretary and Leader of the USSR. Trotsky was assassinated in Mexico in 1940. Eleven died prior to it and only four survived Stalin's purges entirely.

People's Commissar	Original incumbent	Death
Chairman	Vladimir Lenin	Natural causes, 1924
Administrator of Affairs	Vladimir Bonch-Bruyevich	Natural causes, 1955
People's Commissariat for Agriculture	Vladimir Milyutin	Executed 1937
People's Commissariat for Agriculture	Andrei Kolegayev	Executed 1937
People's Commissariat for Military Affairs	Nikolai Podvoisky	Natural causes, 1948
People's Commissariat for Military and Naval Affairs	Pavel Dybenko	Executed 1938
People's Commissariat for Military and Naval Affairs	Vladimir Antonov-Ovseyenko	Executed 1938
People's Commissariat for Military and Naval Affairs	Nikolai Krylenko	Executed 1938
People's Commissariat for Trade and Industry	Viktor Nogin	Natural causes, 1924
People's Commissariat for Education	Anatoly Lunacharsky	Natural causes, 1933
People's Commissariat for Food	Ivan Teodorovich	Executed 1937
People's Commissariat for Food	Alexander Schlichter	Natural causes, 1940
People's Commissariat for Foreign Affairs	Leon Trotsky	Assassinated 1940
People's Commissariat for Interior Affairs	Alexei Rykov	Executed 1938
People's Commissariat for Interior Affairs	Grigory Petrovsky	Natural causes, 1958
People's Commissariat for Justice	Georgy Oppokov	Executed 1938
People's Commissariat for Justice	Pēteris Stučka	Natural causes, 1932
People's Commissariat for Justice	Isaac Steinberg	Natural causes, 1957
People's Commissariat for Labour	Alexander Shlyapnikov	Executed 1937
People's Commissariat of Local Self-Government	Vladimir Trutovsky	Executed 1937
People's Commissariat of Nationalities	Joseph Stalin	Natural causes, 1953
People's Commissariat for Posts and Telegraphs of the RSFSR	Nikolai Glebov-Avilov	Executed 1937
People's Commissariat for Posts and Telegraphs of the RSFSR	Prosh Proshian	Natural causes, 1918
People's Commissariat of Properties	Vladimir Karelin	Executed 1938
People's Commissariat for Railways	Mark Yelizarov	Natural causes, 1919
People's Commissariat of Social Welfare	Alexandra Kollontai	Natural causes, 1952
People's Commissariat of State Control	Eduard Essen	Natural causes, 1931
People's Commissariat for Finance	Ivan Skvortsov-Stepanov	Natural causes, 1928
People's Commissariat for Finance	Vyacheslav Menzhinsky	Natural causes, 1934

== See also ==
- Vikzhel negotiations
