= Boris Kamkov =

Russian revolutionary (1885–1938)

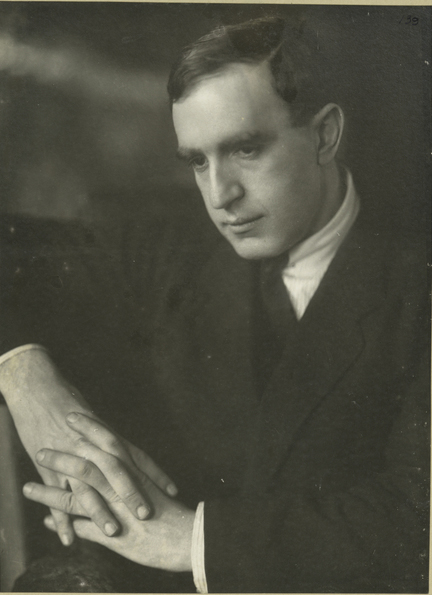
- Born: Boris Davidovich Kats; June 3, 1885; Kobylnia, Bessarabia Governorate, Russian Empire
- Died: August 29, 1938 (aged 53); Moscow, Soviet Union
- Education: Heidelberg University
- Political party: Socialist-Revolutionary Party

Boris Davidovich Kamkov (Russian: Бори́с Дави́дович Камко́в; June 3, 1885 – August 29, 1938) was a Russian revolutionary, a leader of the Left Socialist-Revolutionaries, and a member of the Council of People's Commissars. He was killed during the Great Purge.

== Early years ==
Boris Davidovich Kats, who became known under the name 'Kamkov', was born on June 3, 1885 (O.S.) in Kobylnia, a village in Bessarabia Governorate. He was of a Jewish family and his father was a doctor. As a youth he became involved in radical politics and joined the Socialist-Revolutionary Party (PSR), becoming a member of its 'Combat Organisation' in 1904. He participated in the abortive Revolution of 1905, was arrested and banished to Turukhansk. In 1907, Kamkov escaped and went into exile abroad, living mostly in Germany, France and Sweden. He contributed to various SR publications and studied law at Heidelberg University, graduating in 1911.

== World War I and February Revolution ==
During World War I, Kamkov took an Internationalist position. He belonged to the Parisian SR group 'Life' and supported the Zimmerwald Conference. Kamkov was also involved in organising aid to Russian prisoners of war, using the opportunity to distribute revolutionary propaganda.

After the February Revolution of 1917 he returned to Russia via Germany and was elected to the Petrograd Soviet in April. He became a leader of the staunch anti-war faction of the PSR, along with Maria Spiridonova, Isaac Steinberg, the veteran Mark Natanson and others. This put him in opposition to the Revolutionary Defencist SR and Menshevik leaders who dominated the soviets during Kerensky's government. He squared off against the right SR leader Avram Gots; Gots and Kamkov had both been commissioned to report on the War and gave sharply divergent reports, with Kamkov denouncing Gots as a 'social patriot' and calling for an end to the war. (Note: A.R. Gots and B.D. Kamkov frequently served as spokesmen for the Defencist and Internationalist wings of the PSR.)

Kamkov occupied various minor posts in the PSR but increasingly called for a break with the Defencists. He was one of the leaders of the Party of Left Socialist-Revolutionaries, which broke away from the PSR in the late summer of 1917. Later, at its first official congress in November, he was elected to its central committee. Kamkov was also elected to the All-Russian Congress of Soviets and served on its Central Executive Committee. He was also a member of the Pre-Parliament in September. He advocated the abolition of the Provisional Government and the transfer of all power to the soviets. This was also the battle cry of Lenin's Bolsheviks, and in the lead-up to the October Revolution, the Left SRs collaborated closely with the Bolsheviks. The Left SRs were not privy to the Bolsheviks' plans for a revolution and were not included in the very first Council of People's Commissars; in fact, they had tried to discourage the Bolsheviks from a unilateral seizure of power.

== Collaboration with the Bolsheviks ==
However, after the victory of the Bolsheviks, the Left SRs accepted the October Revolution, and Kamkov participated in negotiations with the Bolsheviks to form a coalition government. Kamkov favoured some agreements between all socialist parties, a popular position at the time, feeling that "the Left should not isolate itself from the moderate democratic forces." However, efforts to bring about such an all-socialist coalition quickly foundered on the opposition of both Lenin and the SR/Menshevik leaders. The Left SRs were the only party to enter a coalition with the Bolsheviks. Along with Isaac Steinberg, A.L. Kollegaev, Vladimir Karelin, V.Y. Trutovsky, V.A. Algasov and P.P. Proshyan, Kamkov became a member of the Council of People's Commissars (without portfolio). He was also elected to the new Central Executive Committee of the All-Russian Congress of Soviets.

The Bolshevik/Left SR coalition was short-lived. Although Kamkov supported the Left SRs' participation in the Russian delegation in the peace negotiations with Imperial Germany at Brest-Litovsk, he was appalled by the harsh conditions imposed on Russia by the Treaty of Brest-Litovsk, fearing that it would suffocate the Russian Revolution. Along with some 'Left Communists', the Left SRs called for rejecting the Treaty. The 'Left Communists' were eventually brought to heel, but in March 1918, the Left SRs resigned from the Soviet government in protest against the peace treaty. Soon afterward, following the so-called 'Left SR uprising', they were expelled from the soviets (the other socialist parties had already been expelled earlier, over the protests of the Left SRs). Kamkov was involved in many of the activities of the Left SRs over the next few months: organising resistance to the Brest-Litovsk Treaty and to the Bolshevik policy of forced grain requisitions, holding merger talks with the 'Socialist Maximalists' and Ukrainian revolutionary groups.

== Conflict with the Bolsheviks ==
In June 1918, the Left SRs abandoned the policy of peaceful protest and began to organise illegal strikes, uprisings and assassination attempts. They killed the German ambassador Count Mirbach on July 6, 1918, and on August 30 attempted to kill Lenin. The Bolsheviks responded with violent repression. The Left SR party was, however, by no means unanimous in favour of violent resistance to the Bolsheviks. Mark Natanson was one of the most prominent Left SRs, but alone in his desire to call for continued co-operation with the Soviet government. This sentiment was echoed by many local Left SR branches. This split contributed to the disintegration of the Left SR party. Kamkov was among the anti-Bolshevik hardliners. On July 7, Kamkov helped organise an armed anti-Bolshevik demonstration by Left SRs, which was quickly suppressed. Kamkov went into hiding. The Bolsheviks regarded the July event as a counter-revolutionary uprising; the Left SRs insisted they had merely wanted to demonstrate the Russian people's opposition to the Bolsheviks and the 'German Imperialists'.

== Prison, exile and death ==
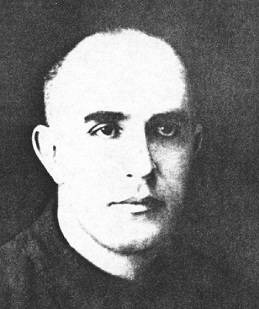
Boris Kamkov in the 1920s

In November 1918, much of the Central Committee of the Left SR party was put on trial. Kamkov, who had escaped to newly independent Lithuania, attempted to reorganise the Central Committee there. In 1920 he returned secretly to Moscow and was arrested. Briefly released, he was arrested again in 1921. In 1923, he was banished to Chelyabinsk, then to Tver and to Voronezh. In 1931 he was sentenced to prison again after a show trial of the so-called 'Labour party'. In 1933, Kamkov was banished to Arkhangelsk, where he worked as a statistician for a few years. In 1937 Kamkov was re-arrested, with the intention of using him as a witness in the upcoming show trial of Nikolai Bukharin in March 1938. However, Kamkov steadfastly refused to incriminate Bukharin in the charge of having plotted with the Left SRs to assassinate Lenin back in 1918, in spite of severe pressure from the GPU. On August 29, 1938, Kamkov himself was sentenced to death. The sentence was carried out the same day. He was rehabilitated by the Soviet Government in 1991.
