= People's Commissariat for Agriculture =

People's Commissariat for Agriculture (Russian: Народный комиссариат земледелия, romanized: Narodnyy komissariat zemledeliya - Narkomzem) was set up in Petrograd in October 1917. Vladimir Milyutin was appointed the first People's Commissar of Agriculture. He was a member of the Council of People's Commissars (Sovnarkom).

The Narkomzem offices located at Orlikov Pereulok, 1, Moscow were designed by Aleksey Shchusev in 1928. This building is currently occupied by the Ministry of Agriculture of the Russian Federation.

Following the establishment of Sovnarkom at the Second All-Russian Congress of Workers' and Soldiers' Deputies' Soviets Lenin attended the Extraordinary All-Russia Congress Of Soviets Of Peasants' Deputies where he promised that the Left Socialist Revolutionaries could select one of their members to become the Narkomsem Commissar. Andrei Kolegayev was appointed to this position on 23 December 1917.

In 1946 the Commissariat was replaced by the Ministry of Agriculture and Food.

== People's Commissars of Agriculture ==
| Narkomzem Commissar | Term of office |
|---|---|
| Vladimir Milyutin (Милютин, Владимир) | 8 November 1917 - 29 November 1917 |
| Alexander Schlichter | 29 November 1917 - 23 December 1917 |
| Andrei Kolegayev | 23 December 1917 - 1 March 1918 |
| Semyon Sereda (Середа, Семëн) | 1 March 1918 - 1 December 1921 |
| Valerian Osinsky-Obolensky (Осинский-Оболенский, Валериан Валерианович) | 1921 - 1922 |
| Yakovenko, Vassiliy Grigor'yevich (Яковенко, Василий Григорьевич) | 1922 - 6 July 1923 |
| Aleksandr Petrovich Smirnov | 1923 - 1928 |
| Nikolay Kubyak | 1928 - 1929 |
| Yakov Yakovlev (Яковлев, Яков) | 8 December 1929 - 1 March 1934 |
| Mikhail Chernov | 1 March 1934 - 29 October 1937 |
| Robert Eiche (Эйхе, Роберт Индрикович) | 29 October 1937 - 15 November 1938 |
| Ivan Aleksandrovich Benediktov (Бенедиктов, Иван Александрович) | 15 November 1938 - 11 December 1943 |
| Andrey Andreyev (Андреев, Андрей) | 11 December 1943 - 15 March 1946 |

== See also ==
Ministry of Agriculture (Russia)
