= Ryazan electoral district =

Constituency of the Russian Republic

Ryazan
- Former Civilian constituency for the All-Russian Constituent Assembly
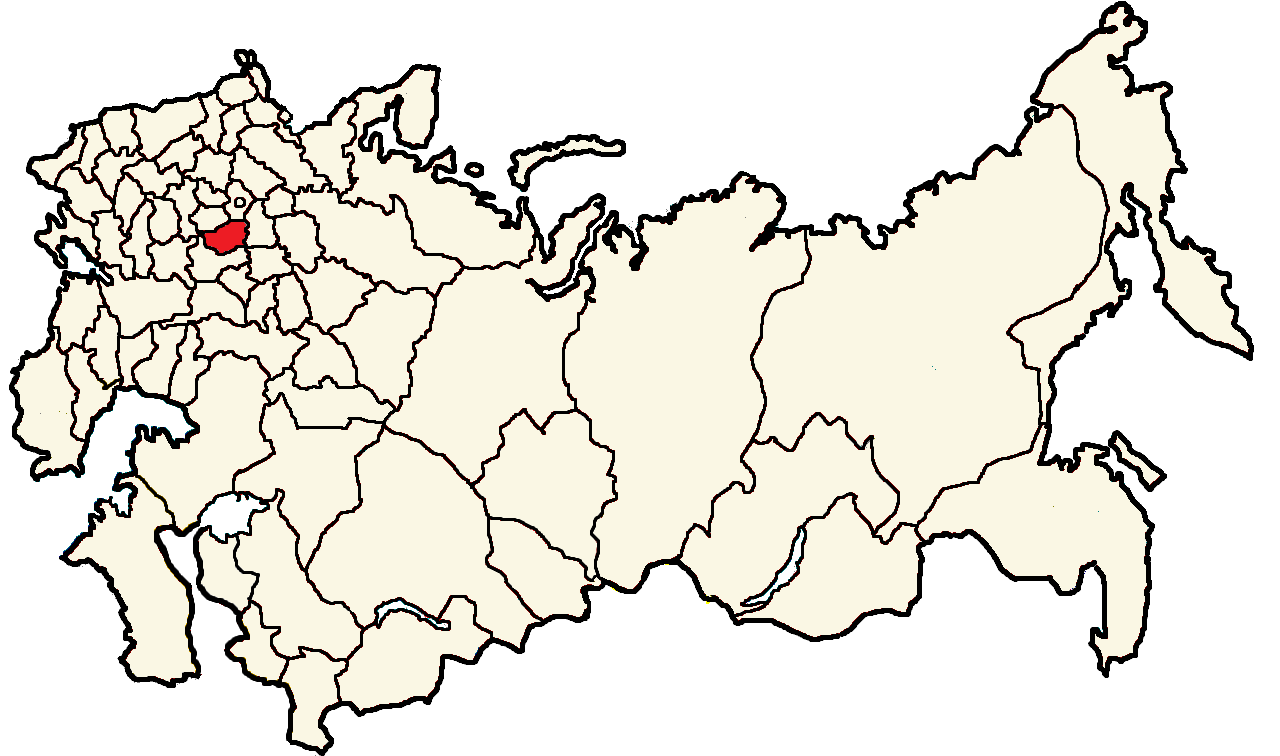

Former constituency
- Created: 1917
- Abolished: 1918
- Number of members: 10
- Number of Uyezd Electoral Commissions: 12
- Number of Urban Electoral Commissions: 1
- Number of Parishes: 251

The Ryazan electoral district (Russian: Рязанский избирательный округ) was a constituency created for the 1917 Russian Constituent Assembly election. The electoral district covered the Ryazan Governorate. Ryazan Governorate was a rural province, marked by history of serfdom and the struggles following the Emancipation reform of 1861. Socialist-Revolutionaries and Bolsheviks battled for hegemony over the peasantry and the distribution of lands.

There were 1,190,190 eligible voters in the constituency. The account of U.S. historian Oliver Henry Radkey, who is the source for the vote tally in the results table below, is missing the votes from Egoriev uezd (1 out of 12 uezds in the electoral district).

In Ryazan town the main party were the Constitutional Democrats, who mustered 6,430 votes (43.2%). The Bolsheviks obtained 3,841 votes (25.8%), the SRs 2,279 votes (15.3%), the Landowner-Old Believer list 1,121 votes (7.5%), Popular Socialists 612 votes (4.1%), Mensheviks 584 votes (3.9%) and the Group of Non-Party Voters 36 votes (0.2%). In the Ryazan garrison the Bolsheviks obtained 73.5% of the vote (2,929 votes). In Zaraisk town the SRs got 1,429 votes, the Kadets 1,215 votes, Bolsheviks 939 votes, Popular Socialists 156 votes and Mensheviks 85 votes. In Skopin town the Kadets got 1,816 votes, Bolsheviks 318 votes, Mensheviks 267 votes, the SRs 237 votes and the Popular Socialists 117 votes.

== Results ==
Ryazan
Party	Vote	%	Seats
List 3 - Socialist-Revolutionaries and Soviet of Peasants Deputies	397,229	57.14	6
List 5 - Bolsheviks	251,815	36.22	4
List 1 - Kadets	27,808	4.00	
List 4 - Popular Socialists	5,216	0.75	
List 2 - Mensheviks	4,389	0.63	
List 7 - Bloc of Landowners and Old Believers	1,041	0.15	
List 6 - Group of Non-Party Voters	?	?	
Unaccounted	7,732	1.11	
Total:	695,230		10

Deputies Elected
Barinov	SR
Gendelman	SR
Govorov	SR
Pavlov	SR
Sorokin	SR
Sukharev	SR
Gorshkov	Bolshevik
Osinsky	Bolshevik
Sereda	Bolshevik
Voronkov	Bolshevik
