= Ivan Teodorovich =

Russian Bolshevik revolutionary and Soviet bureaucrat (1875–1937)

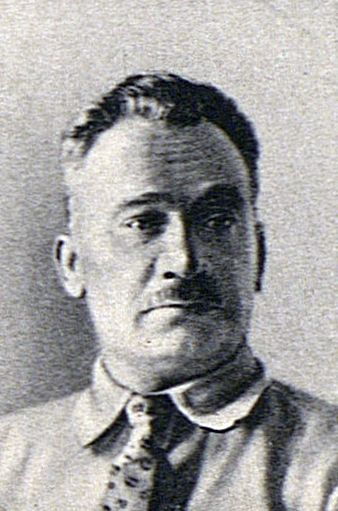
- Teodorovich in 1917

People's Commissar for Food
- In office 1917–1917
- Preceded by: Position established
- Succeeded by: Alexander Schlichter

Personal details
- Born: 10 September 1875 Smolensk, Russian Empire
- Died: 20 September 1937 (aged 62) Moscow, Russian SFSR, Soviet Union
- Resting place: Donskoye Cemetery
- Party: All-Union Communist Party (Bolsheviks)
- Education: Moscow State University

Ivan Adolfovich Teodorovich (Russian: Ива́н Адольфо́вич Теодо́рович; Polish: Iwan Adolfowicz Teodorowicz; September 10 10 September [O.S. 29 August] 1875 – 20 September 1937) was a Russian Bolshevik revolutionary and Soviet bureaucrat who served as the first Commissar for Food at the establishment of the Council of People's Commissars (October–November 1917). He also became a Soviet historian of the Russian revolutionary movement.

== Life and political career ==
Teodorovich, the son of a land-surveyor from Smolensk, was born into a family of ethnic Polish origin. His great-grandfather took part in the November Uprising in Warsaw in 1830. His father and two of his uncles fought in the January Uprising of 1863. From this background, Teodorovich would write, he first learned to hate "tsarism, its officials, and [the] military establishment". Teodorovich spent his childhood in severe poverty: his mother, struggling to support six sons, worked as a seamstress and laundrywoman.

Teodorovich attended Moscow State University, where he joined an early Marxist group in 1895. From 1902 to 1903 he served as a member of the Moscow Committee of the Russian Social Democratic Labour Party. After a series of arrests, in 1903 the tsarist authorities sent Teodorovich into exile in Yakutia. Escaping in 1905, he fled to Switzerland, where he made personal contact with Vladimir Lenin. In October 1905 Teodorovich returned to Russia and operated in Saint Petersburg; he gained promotion to become a member of the Central Committee in 1907. In May 1909 he was arrested again and remained in custody until the February Revolution of 1917.

After the February Revolution of March 1917 he left his place of exile and arrived in Petrograd in mid-March. He was a delegate to the 7th (April) All-Russian Conference (where he was elected a candidate member of the Central Committee) and to the 6th Congress of the RSDLP (B). From August 1917 he served as deputy chairman of the Petrograd City Council, then as a member of the council and special presence in food.

Immediately after the October Revolution, Teodorovich became the first People's Commissar for Food in the first Bolshevik government, or Council of People's Commissars of the Russian Soviet Federative Socialist Republic. But ten days later, on 17 November he resigned due to political disagreement with Lenin's majority over a proposed coalition with the Mensheviks and other factions (Teodorovich supported a broad coalition, against Lenin's will).

In 1918, he returned to Siberia, and during the Russian Civil War he fought in a partisan detachment against the White Army of Admiral Kolchak. In 1920 he returned to the board of the Commissariat for Agriculture and rose to become Deputy Commissar in May 1922; in 1928-1930 he chaired the Peasants' branch of the Comintern. As the Bolsheviks' expert on agriculture, Teodorovich delivered speeches to various councils and international forums, and authored brochures, journal and newspaper articles dealing with agriculture and agrarian policy. Teodorovich was a proponent of Lenin's New Economic Policy (the NEP); he further endorsed liberal land-reforms (delegating authority over land from the state to peasants). Contrary to the Bolsheviks' platform on agrarian policy, Teodorovich vehemently opposed the policy of food requisition and war communism. He supported the formation of a homogeneous socialist government with the participation of the Mensheviks and Socialist Revolutionaries. After The Central Committee of the RSDLP (B) rejected the agreement with these parties, Teodorovich on November 4 (17), 1917 signed a statement of withdrawal from the SNK, but continued to carry out his duties until December.

"(T)he disagreement concerned the question of whether our party had to start with "war communism" or whether it was possible to proceed from what was called the "new economic policy" in 1921. I held in 1917 the latter opinion .." - Ivan Teodorovich Autobiography

In articles of the 1920s, Teodorovich interpreted the NEP as a means of accumulating funds in the capitalist agrarian sector through the development of "strong" peasant farms, which was to serve as a source of funds for industrialization, including its transition to socialism. In the People's Commissariat Teodorovich supervised the work of economist N. D. Kondratiev, who led the department of agricultural economics and statistics of the Department of Agriculture and provided Teodorovich with a degree of protection and patronage (in particular, Kondratiev contributed in 1920 to his release from arrest).

At the beginning of 1918 Teodorovich left for Siberia after parting ways with Lenin's first government. In 1919-1920 he was in the red partisan units in Siberia. In 1920-1928 Teodorovich served as a member of the College of the People's Commissariat of Agriculture of the RSFSR. From May 1922 to 1928 he was deputy of the People's Commissar of Agriculture of the RSFSR, 1926-1930 Director of the International Agrarian Institute.

Teodorovich was removed from his post as Deputy People's Commissar a few weeks after the People's Commissar, Aleksandr Smirnov had been sacked, in February 1928, for 'peasant deviation', meaning that he had resisted a decision taken by Joseph Stalin to send detachments into the countryside to seize grain form the peasants to revolve a food shortage in the cities. Teodorovich was not publicly denounced at this stage, even if he was suspected of sharing Smirnov's pro-peasant sympathies. In 1923, he had been a delegate to the founding conference of Peasant International (Krestintern), and in March 1928, he replaced Smirnov as in October 1923, and was secretary general of Krestintern.

In July 1930, the economist Nikolai Kondratiev was arrested, and accused of organising a clandestine "Peasants' Labour Party". This was near the start of the programme that forced peasant to give up their land and live in collective farms. Stalin suspected Teodorovich, whom he called a "scoundrel", of acting as a link between Kondratiev and Nikolai Bukharin, Alexei Rykov and Mikhail Tomsky, who had led the opposition to forced collectivisation.

Teodorovich was sacked from his position in Krestintern, but unlike Smirnov, Kondratiev and others, he was not arrested. He was allowed to continue working in Moscow, as a member of the Society of Former Political Prisoners and Exiled Settlers. In 1929–35, he edited the society's journal, Katorga i ssylka. An ordinance of the Central Committee of the VKP (b) of the Society of Former Political Prisoners and Exiled Settlers closed the magazine on June 25, 1935, for factional activities.

Teodorovich was arrested during the Great Purge on 11 June 1937, and convicted in the trial of the so-called Moskva Center group (involving a total of 120 people). Stalin and Molotov sanctioned the trial on September 15, 1937. Teodorovich was executed five days later.

Ivan Teodorovich was posthumously rehabilitated on April 11, 1956, and is buried in the Don Cemetery in Moscow.

== Works ==
- О государственном регулировании крестьянского хозяйства. М., 1921
- Судьбы русского крестьянства, М., 1923, 1924, 1925
- К вопросу о сельскохозяйственной политике в РСФСР, М., 1923
- Уроки союза рабочих и крестьян в СССР. Доклад на 2-м съезде Международного крестьянского совета, М., 1925
- Восемь лет нашей крестьянской политике. М., 1926
- Вопросы индустриализации и сельское хозяйство. Свердловск, 1927
- Историческое значение партии «Народной воли», М., изд. Политикаторжан, 1930
- О Горьком и Чехове, М.—Л., ГИЗ, 1930
- «1 марта 1881 г.», М., 1931

== Family ==
- Wife - Okulova-Teodorovich, Glafira Ivanovna (23.4 (6.5) .1878–19.10.1957) - Soviet politician and party leader.
- Son - Konstantin Ivanovich Teodorovich (1907–1964) - an artist and writer
