= Royal town =

Royal town may refer to:

- A place with royal patronage in the United Kingdom
- Royal burgh, in Scotland
- Royal city in Polish–Lithuanian Commonwealth, a historical type of city
- Royal cities in Czech lands
- Palace town in the Russian Empire

== See also ==
- Royal City (disambiguation)
