= Ministry of Agriculture and Food (Soviet Union) =

Government ministry of the Soviet Union

The People's Commissariat for Agriculture, abbreviated as Narkomzem was established in the RSFSR following the October Revolution. When the RSFSR joined the other Soviet republics to form the Union of Soviet Socialist Republics (USSR), agriculture was to be an area of policy (along with education, health, etc.) governed exclusively by the individual union republics and Narkomzem remained a Commissariat of the RSFSR and other respective Soviet Socialist Republics. Coinciding with the onset of the policy of mass collectivisation of agriculture and the Five Year Plan, it was decided to create a union-level People's Commissariat for Agriculture of the USSR in 1929 which would exist above the republic-level People's Commissariats of Agriculture. Its headquarters building was located at Orlikov Pereulok, 1, Moscow, designed by Aleksey Shchusev in 1928. Narkomzem was reformed as the Soviet Ministry of Agriculture and Food (Minsel'khoz) in 1946.

== History ==
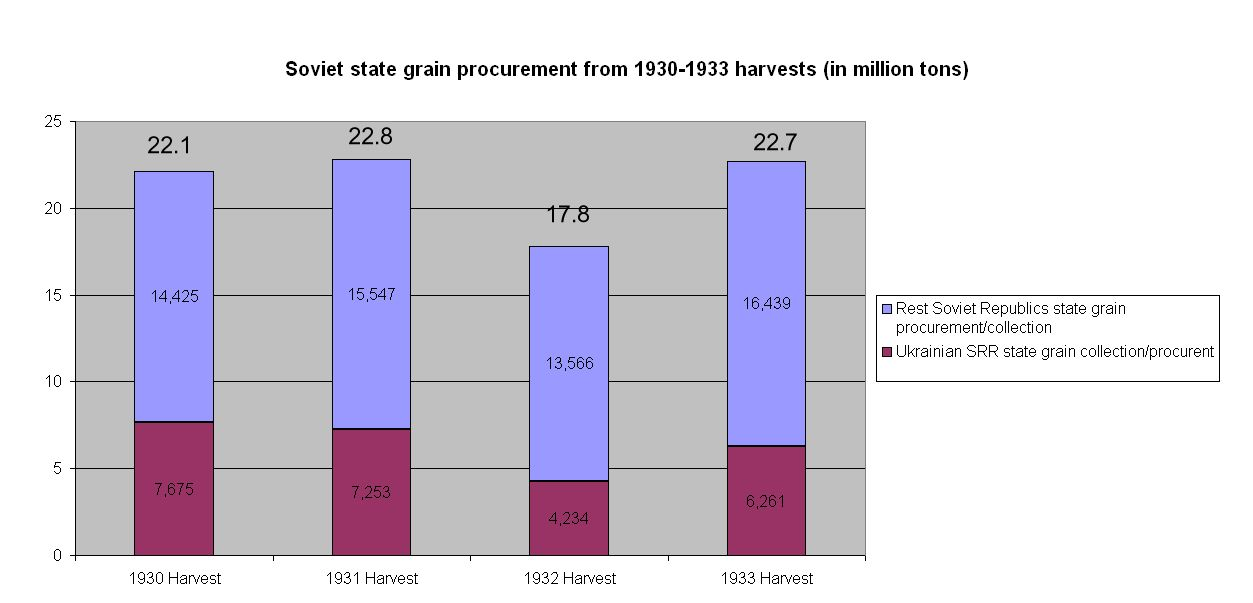
Graph for the Soviet Union and Ukrainian SRR (share state grain procurement from 1930 to 1933 harvests. Figures derived from The Industrialisation of Soviet Russia Volume 5: The Years of Hunger: Soviet Agriculture 1931-1933

The commissariat united all republican commissariats of the Soviet Union. It was formally known as the People's Commissariat for Agriculture (Russian: Народный комиссариат земледелия - Narkomzem) was set up in Petrograd in October 1917. Vladimir Milyutin was appointed the first People's Commissar of Agriculture. He was a member of the Council of People's Commissars.

The Ministry was abolished in November 1985 with the creation of the State Agro-Industrial Committee (Gosagroprom) which took over the functions of the Ministry for Agriculture, the Ministry for Fruit and Vegetable Production, the Ministry for the Meat and Dairy Industry, the Ministry of the Food Industry and the Ministry for Rural Construction.

== Role in offensive Soviet biological warfare programme ==
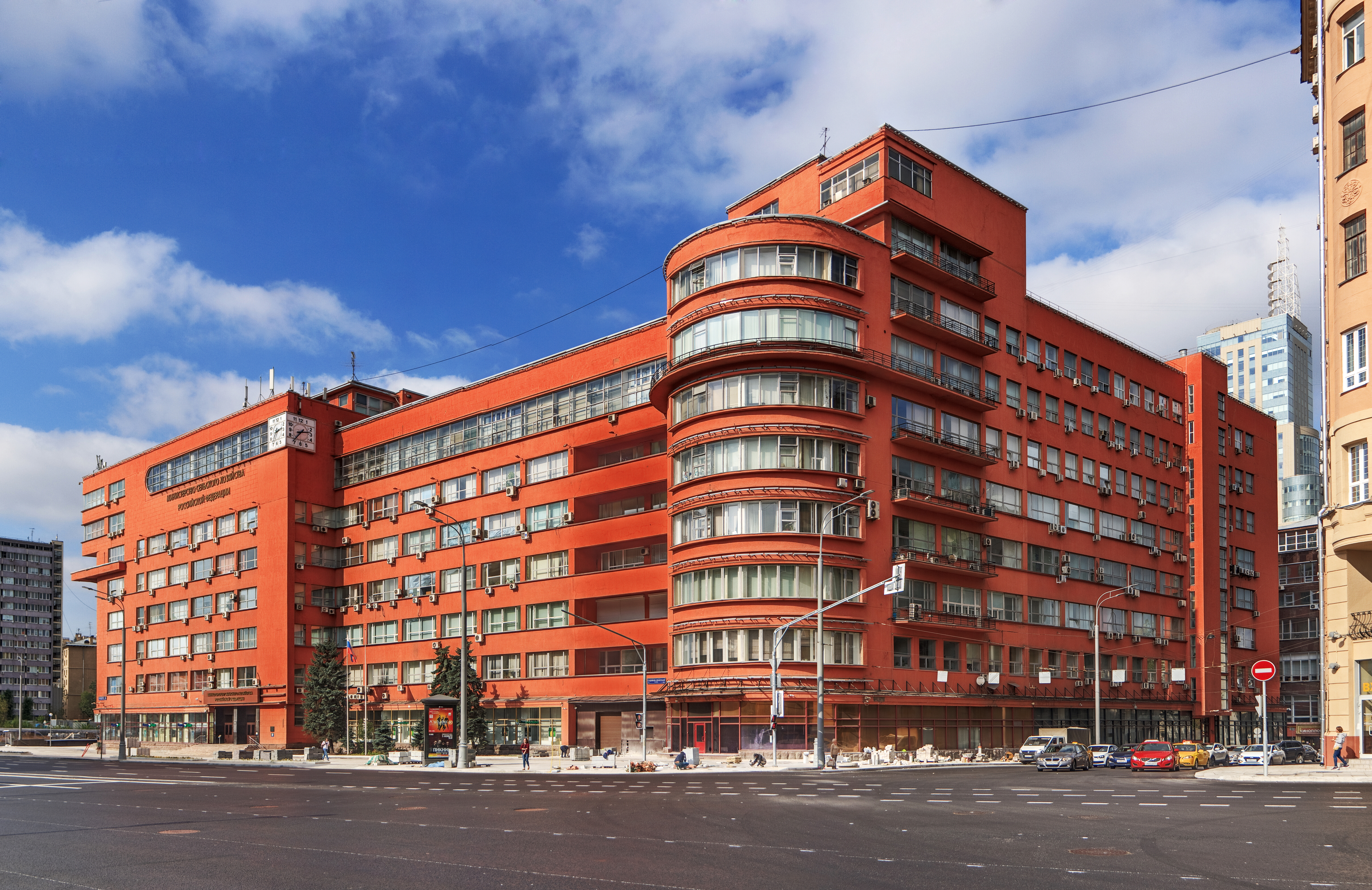
Narkomzem Building, Ministry Headquarters

For more than four decades, the USSR Ministry of Agriculture managed a large Soviet offensive biological warfare programme focused on the development of anti-livestock and anti-crop agents. The crucial step to initiating a coordinated large-scale agricultural biowarfare effort was the issue on the 7 August 1958 of decree No. 909–426 by the Central Committee of the Communist Party of the Soviet Union (CPSU) and the USSR Council of Ministers. It was officially focused on "strengthening work in the field of microbiology and virology". In reality the decree established six specialised research institutes and their affiliated branches under a secret new department of the USSR Ministry of Agriculture, the Main Administration for Scientific-Research and Experimental-Production Establishments (GUNIiEPU), also known as the 7th (Special) Administration of Minsel'khoz. The agricultural biowarfare programme was given the name "Ekologiya" ("Ecology"), and was also referred to as Problem "E". The Ekologiya programme was composed of two very distinct strands, one focusing on plant diseases and the other on diseases associated with agricultural animals.

Despite having signed the 1972 Biological Weapons Convention (BWC), the Soviet Union continued development and production of offensive biological weapons. Under a new, top-secret, national nerve centre, the Interdepartmental Scientific-Technical Council for Molecular Biology and Genetics, there was a major shift in focus to the development of genetically modified biological warfare agents, with wholly new and unexpected properties. Under the direction of the council, there was an intensification of the agricultural biowarfare programme with an expansion of the network of facilities. Some 10,000 scientists and technicians would eventually be enrolled within Ekologiya. One aspect of the programme concerned the creation of reserve mobilisation production facilities for anti-agricultural BW agents. The best documented of these mobilisation plants was the Pokrov Factory of Biological Preparations, which was commissioned in 1979. During his 1993 visit to Pokrov, David Kelly, a UK weapons inspector, is reported to have departed the site feeling this was "the most sinister facility" he had visited in Russia. A number of biological agents were focused on by the Ekologiya network. The anti-livestock pathogens included: rinderpest virus; foot-and-mouth disease virus; Bacillus anthracis (the causative agent of anthrax), African swine fever virus, African horse sickness virus and sheeppox virus. Anti-crop pathogens studied and developed included: rice blast (Magnaporthe grisea), rice bacteriosis (Xanthomonas oryzae); late blight of potatoes (Phytophthora infestans); and rust diseases of wheat and other small grain crops. There is no reliable information at all with regard to which delivery systems were to be employed to allow the agricultural BW agents developed by the network to be used against enemy crops and herds of livestock. Ken Alibek, who had some limited interaction with the Soviet military agricultural network, claims that the agents were "designed to be sprayed from tanks attached to Ilyushin bombers and flown over a target area along a straight line for hundreds of miles".

== List of ministers ==
=== People's Commissars for Agriculture ===
- Vladimir Milyutin (8.11.1917 - 29.11.1917)
- Andrei Kolegayev (23.12.1917 - 1.3.1918)
- Semyon Sereda (1.3.1918 - 1.12.1921)
- Vasili Yakovenko (1.12.1921 - 6.7.1923)
- Yakov Yakovlev (8.12.1929 - 1.4.1934)
- Mikhail Alexandrovich Chernov (1.4.1934 - 29.10.1937)
- Robert Eikhe (29.10.1937 - 15.11.1938)
- Ivan Benediktov (15.11.1938 - 11.12.1943)
- Andrey Andreyevich Andreyev (11.12.1943 - 15.3.1946)

=== Ministers of Agriculture ===
- Andrei Andreev (19.3.1946 - 26.3.1946)
- Ivan Benediktov (26.3.1946 - 6.3.1953)
- Alexei Kozlov (6.3.1953 - 26.9.1953)
- Ivan Benediktov (26.9.1953 - 18.10.1955)
- Vladimir Matskevich (19.10.1955 - 29.12.1960)
- Mikhail Olshanski (29.12.1960 - 24.4.1962)
- Konstantin Pysin (25.4.1962 - 8.3.1963)
- Ivan Volovtshenko (8.3.1963 - 18.2.1965)
- Vladimir Matskevich (18.2.1965 - 2.2.1973)
- Dmitry Polyansky (2.2.1973 - 16.3.1976)
- Valentin Mesyats (16.3.1976 - 18.11.1985)

=== Ministers of Agriculture and Food ===
- Vjatsheslav Chernoivanov (20.3.1991 - 24.8.1991)

== See also ==
- Ministry of Agriculture (Russia)
- Kolkhoz
- Sovkhoz
