= Royal City =

Royal City may refer to:

== Places ==
=== Historical ===
- Royal city in Polish–Lithuanian Commonwealth, a historical type of cities
- Royal cities, a historic title of Czech cities and towns

=== Current ===
- Royal City, Washington, United States
- Ciudad Real, Spain
- Wangcheng (Zhou dynasty) in China
- Klang (city), Malaysia
- Royal City Avenue, a neighborhood in Bangkok, Thailand

As a nickname

- New Westminster, British Columbia, Canada
- Guelph, Ontario, Canada

== Other uses ==
- Royal City (band), a Canadian rock band
  - Royal City (album), a 2009 album by the band
- Royal City, a comic by Jeff Lemire
- Royal City Curling Club, based in New Westminster, British Columbia
- Royal City Roller Derby, a roller derby league in Guelph, Ontario, Canada

== See also ==
- Royal town (disambiguation)
