= Council of People's Commissars =

Government institution in the Russian SFSR and the Soviet Union

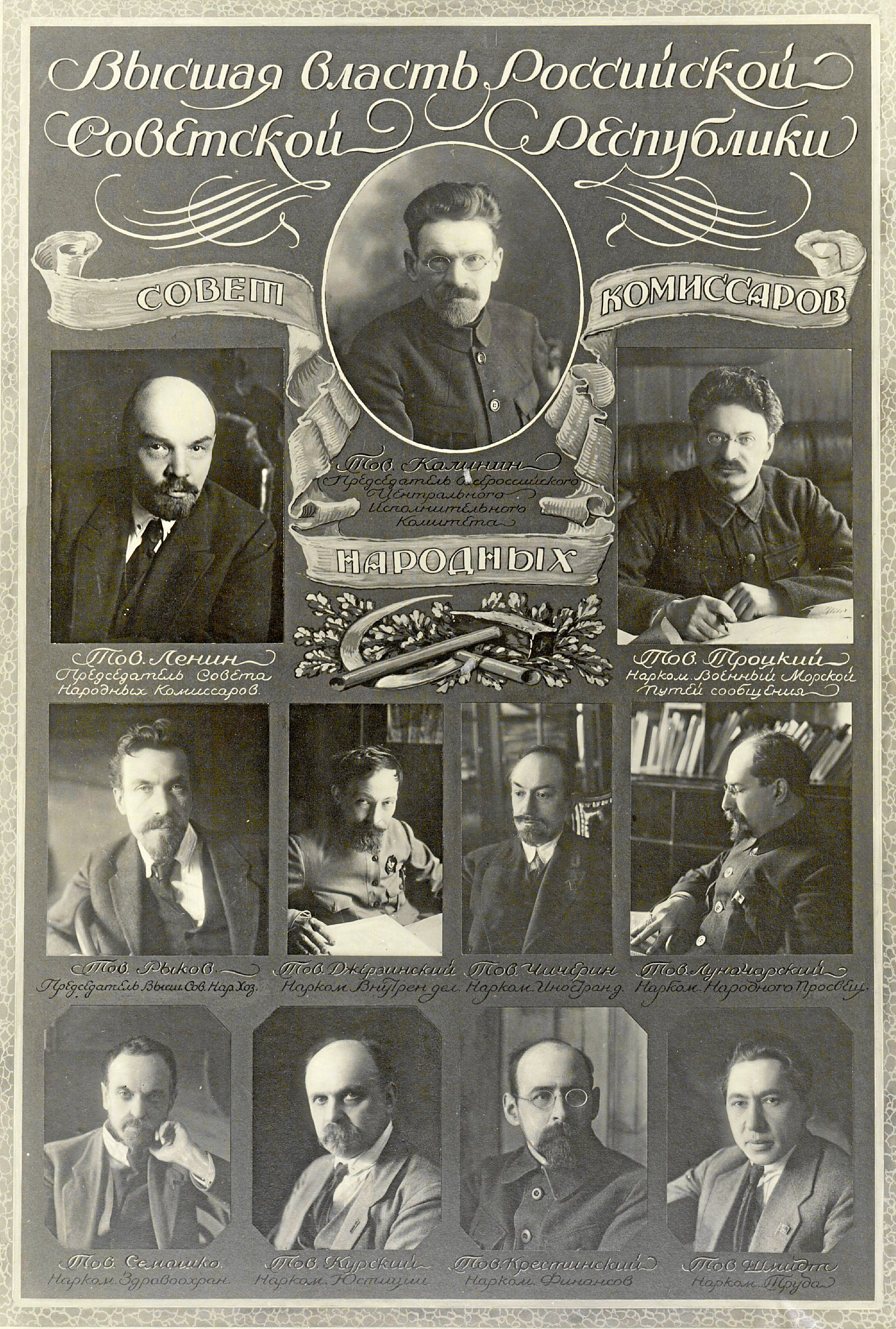
The Council of People's Commissars in 1919. Title reads "Top Authority of the Russian Soviet Republic"

The Council of People's Commissars (CPC) (Russian: Совет народных комиссаров (СНК), romanized: Sovet narodnykh kommissarov (SNK)), commonly known as the Sovnarkom (Совнарком), were the highest executive authorities of the Russian Soviet Federative Socialist Republic (RSFSR), the Soviet Union (USSR), and the Soviet republics from 1917 to 1946.

The Sovnarkom of the RSFSR was founded in the Russian Republic soon after the October Revolution in 1917 and its role was formalized in the 1918 Constitution of the RSFSR to be responsible to the Congress of Soviets of the RSFSR for the "general administration of the affairs of the state". Unlike its predecessor the Russian Provisional Government which had representatives of various political parties, and except for the brief two-party cabinet with the Left Socialist-Revolutionaries from December 1917 to March 1918, the Sovnarkom was a government of a single party, the Bolsheviks. The Sovnarkom of the USSR and Congress of Soviets of the USSR founded in 1922 were modelled on the RSFSR system, and identical Sovnarkom bodies were founded in the Soviet republics and autonomous republics. The Sovnarkom evolved into the main executive of the government of the Soviet Union with its head, the Premier of the USSR, serving as head of government. The Sovnarkom issued decrees having the force of law when the Congress was not in session, and if these decrees were not approved at the Congress's next session, they were considered revoked.

The Sovnarkom was dissolved and transformed into the Council of Ministers in 1946.

== Original People's Commissars ==
The first council elected by the Second All-Russian Congress of Soviets in late 1917 was composed as follows. Many early commissars later opposed the party majority organized by Stalin and allegedly conspired with the Trotskyist opposition or some other opposition group, which resulted in their expulsion from the party or being arrested. The party had banned factional opposition groups at the Eleventh Party Congress during 1921. Still, the original council included Left-Communists, Trotskyists and other ex-oppositionists. Most alleged conspirators were executed for treason during the Great Purge, while some had sentences reduced to imprisonment.

Composition of the first Council of People's Commissars of Soviet Russia
Office	Name	Death
Chairman	Vladimir Lenin	Stroke, 1924
Head of the Administration of the council (Secretary)	Vladimir Bonch-Bruyevich	Natural causes, 1955
People's Commissariat for Foreign Affairs	Leon Trotsky	Assassinated 1940
People's Commissariat for Agriculture	Vladimir Milyutin	Executed 1937
Council of People's Commissars on War and Navy Affairs	Nikolai Krylenko (War College)	Executed 1938
Council of People's Commissars on War and Navy Affairs	Pavel Dybenko (Navy College)	Executed 1938
People's Commissariat for Trade and Industry	Viktor Nogin	Natural causes 1924
People's Commissariat for Education	Anatoly Lunacharsky	Natural causes 1933
People's Commissariat for Food	Ivan Teodorovich	Executed 1937
People's Commissariat for Internal Affairs	Alexei Rykov	Executed 1938
People's Commissariat for Justice	Georgy Oppokov	Executed 1938
People's Commissariat for Labour	Alexander Shlyapnikov	Executed 1937
People's Commissariat for Nationalities	Joseph Stalin	Natural causes 1953
People's Commissariat for Posts and Telegraphs	Nikolai Glebov-Avilov	Executed 1937
People's Commissariat for Railways	vacant, later Mark Yelizarov	Typhus, 1919
People's Commissariat for Finance	Ivan Skvortsov-Stepanov	Typhoid fever, 1928
People's Commissariat for Social Welfare	Alexandra Kollontai	Natural causes, 1952

== All-Union Sovnarkom ==
Upon the creation of the USSR in 1922, the Soviet Union's government was modelled after the first Sovnarkom. The Soviet republics retained their own governments which dealt with domestic matters.

== Sovmin ==
In 1946, the Sovnarkoms were transformed into the Council of Ministers (Sovmin) at both all-Union and Union Republic level.

== Councils by administrative division ==
- Council of People's Commissars of the Soviet Union

=== Soviet republics ===
- Council of People's Commissars of the Russian Soviet Federative Socialist Republic
- Council of People's Commissars (Ukraine) (Temporary government of Workers and Peasants of Ukraine)
- Council of People's Commissars of Belarus, including LitBel
- Council of People's Commissars of Azerbaijan
- Council of People's Commissars (Armenia)
- Council of People's Commissars (Bukhara)
- Council of People's Commissars (Khorezm)
- Council of People's Commissars (Georgia)
- Council of People's Commissars (Turkestan)
- Council of People's Commissars (Transcaucasia)
- Council of People's Commissars (Kazakhstan), including as autonomous Kyrgyz (before 1925)
- Council of People's Commissars (Turkmenistan)
- Council of People's Commissars (Kyrgyzstan), including as autonomous Kyrgyz (after 1925)
- Council of People's Commissars (Uzbekistan)
- Council of People's Commissars (Tajikistan), including as autonomous
- Council of People's Commissars (Karelia-Finland), including as autonomous Karelia
- Council of People's Commissars (Moldova), including as autonomous
- Council of People's Commissars of the Lithuanian SSR
- Council of People's Commissars (Latvia)
- Council of People's Commissars (Estonia)

=== Autonomous republics ===
- Council of People's Commissars (Adjara)
- Council of People's Commissars (Volga German)
- Council of People's Commissars (Bashkorstan)
- Council of People's Commissars (Buryat-Mongolia)
- Council of People's Commissars (Mountainous)
- Council of People's Commissars (Dagestan)
- Council of People's Commissars (Kabardin-Balkaria), including Kabardin (1944–1957)
- Council of People's Commissars (Cossack)
- Council of People's Commissars (Kalmykia)
- Council of People's Commissars (Karakalpakistan)
- Council of People's Commissars (Komi)
- Council of People's Commissars (Crimea)
- Council of People's Commissars (Mari)
- Council of People's Commissars (Mordva)
- Council of People's Commissars (Nakhichevan)
- Council of People's Commissars (North Osetia)
- Council of People's Commissars (Tatarstan)
- Council of People's Commissars (Tuva)
- Council of People's Commissars (Udmurtia)
- Council of People's Commissars (Chechnia-Ingushetia)
- Council of People's Commissars (Chuvashia)
- Council of People's Commissars (Yakutia)
- Council of People's Commissars (Abkhazia), including as autonomous

=== Short-lived early soviet republics ===
- Council of People's Commissars (Donetsk-Krivoi Rog)
- Council of People's Commissars (Odessa), initially as Rumcherod
- Council of People's Commissars (Poland)
- Council of People's Commissars (Galicia)
- Council of People's Commissars (Far East)
- Council of People's Secretaries (Soviet Ukraine)

== See also ==
- 26 Baku Commissars
- Government of the Soviet Union
- Deputy Premier of the Soviet Union
- First Deputy Premier of the Soviet Union
- Executive Officer of the Soviet Union
- Council of Ministers
- Cabinet of Ministers
