= People's Commissariat of Properties =

Establishment in Soviet Russia

The People's Commissariat of Properties (Russian: Народный Комиссариат имуществ) was an establishment in Soviet Russia which after the October Revolution in Russia took charge of royal properties thereby replacing the His Imperial Majesty Cabinet of the Ministry of the Imperial Court and later managed other state properties, such as museums, libraries, etc. In the latter respect it worked in the conjunction with the People's Commissariat of Enlightenment.

== History ==
The Ministry of the Imperial Court was established in 1826. Among other things it managed personal property of the emperor and members of the imperial family, construction and maintenance of royal palaces, gardens, and parks, management of palace towns, etc.

After the February Revolution the apparatus of the former ministry was placed under the supervision of the Commissioner of the Russian Provisional Government "по ведомству Бывшего Министерства Двора и Уделов", Fyodor Aleksandrovich Golovin. He planned to establish the Main Directorate of State Artistic Properties and Institutions (Главное управление государственных художественных имуществ и учреждений), but this was abandoned due to the October Revolution. On November 6, 1917, the Commissariat of the Properties of the Republic was established. It turned out that its affairs were inseparable from those of People's Commissariat of Enlightenment and initially their activities were coordinated. However eventually the Commissariat of Properties was reformed into a department of the People's Commissariat of Enlightenment in July 1918.

During December 1917-March 1918 the People's Commissariat of Properties was headed by Vladimir Karelin.
