= Cobîlea =

- Village
- Location within Moldova
- Coordinates: 47°52′N 28°40′E
- Country: Moldova

Government
  - Mayor: Angela Ababei (PDM)
- Elevation: 205 m (673 ft)

Population (2014 census)
  - Total: 2,276
- Time zone: UTC+2 (EET)
  - Summer (DST): UTC+3 (EEST)
- Postal code: MD-7214

Cobîlea is a village in Șoldănești District, Moldova. The village is mentioned in a document dating to 1482.

Legend placed here a wooden church established by Stephen III of Moldavia in 1484. In the front of the present church, dated 1822, is an oak tree that is over 700 years old.
