= Narkomprod =

People's Commissariat in Soviet Russia

Narkomprod or the People's Commissariat for Food Supplies, (translit. Narodny Commissariat Prodovolstviya, Russian: Наркомпрод, Народный комиссариат продовольствия) was the Commissariat of the Russian SFSR (Narkomprod of the RSFSR) and later of the Soviet Union (Narkomprod of the USSR) in charge of food supplies and consumer industrial goods.

The Narkomprod was responsible in June 1918 for the attempted organisation of 'committees of the poor' in provincial villages. This was an attempt to encourage a 'class war' in the countryside but it did not materialise, mainly because the peasants were not resentful of 'kulaks' (rich peasants) as there was a tendency for all peasants to have the same interests (for example, their own land ownership).

== People's Commissars ==
- Ivan Teodorovich (1875–1937) (Russian Иван Адольфович Теодорович), 1917–1917
- Alexander Schlichter (1868–1940) (Russian Александр Григорьевич Шлихтер), 1917–1918
- Alexander Zjurupa (1870–1928) (Russian Александр Дмитриевич Цюрупа), 1918–1921
- Nikolai Bryukhanov (1878–1938) (Russian Николай Павлович Брюханов), 1921–1923 (of RSFSR) 1923–1924 (of the USSR)
