= Prosh Proshian =

- Պռոշ Պռոշյան
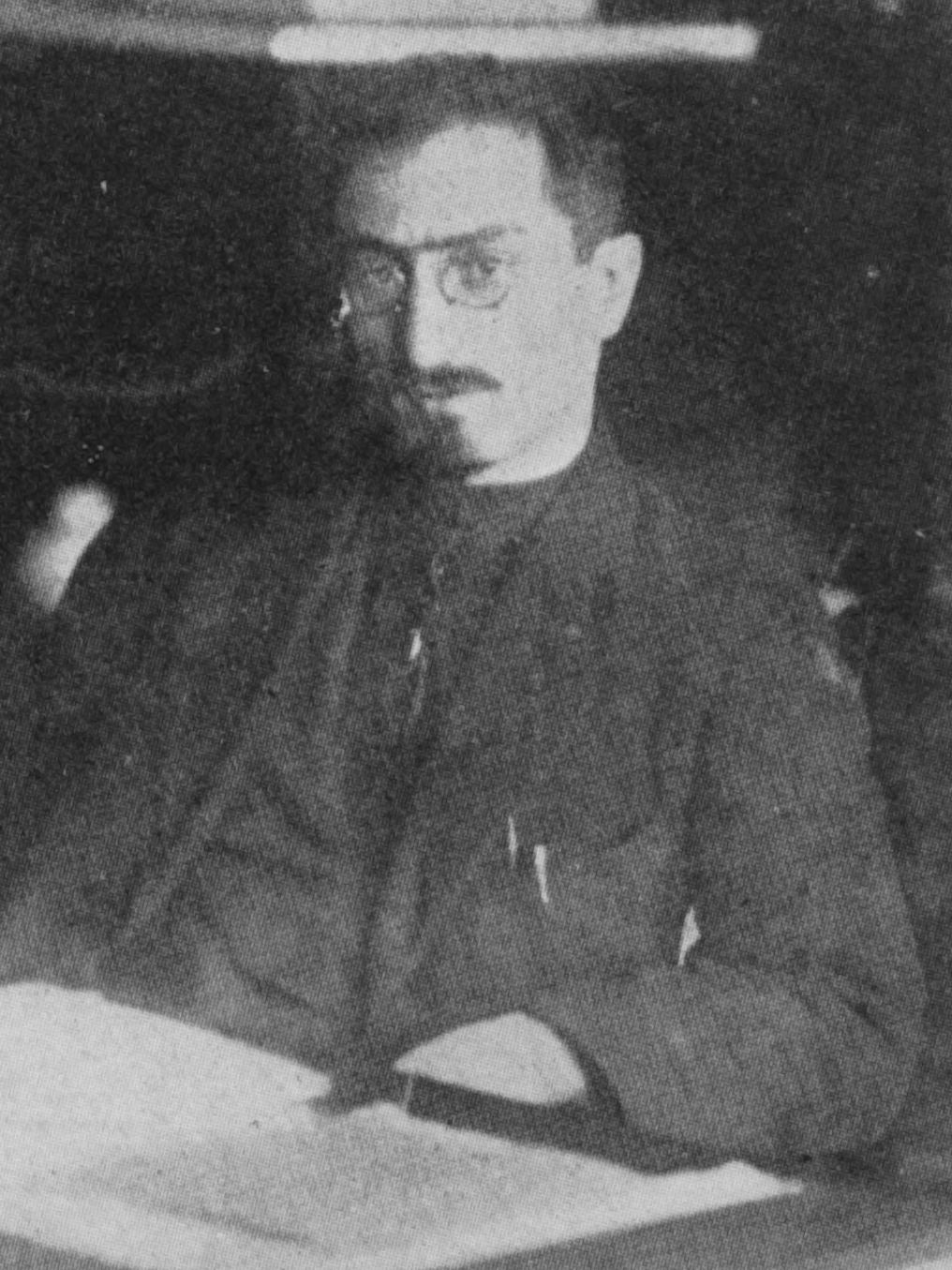

People's Commissar of Posts and Telegraph of the RSFSR
- In office December 23, 1917 – March 18, 1918
- Preceded by: Nikolai Glebov-Avilov
- Succeeded by: Vadim Podbelsky

Personal details
- Born: April 22, 1883 Ashtarak, Russian Empire
- Died: December 16, 1918 (aged 35) Moscow, Russian SFSR
- Party: Left SRs
- Parent: Perch Proshyan (father)

Prosh Perchevich Proshian (or Proshyan; April 22, 1883 – December 16, 1918) was an Armenian revolutionary active in the Left Socialist Revolutionary Party (left SR).

In November he stood as a candidate for the Baltic Fleet electoral district during the elections for the Russian Constituent Assembly. On December 9, 1917, he was appointed People's Commissar for Post and Telegraphs alongside several other Left SRs. When the Executive Committee of the Council of People's Commissars he joined Lenin, Trotsky and Stalin along with fellow Left SR, Vladimir Karelin.

== Biography ==
Prosh Proshian was born in 1883 in the village of Ashtarak, Armenia. He was the son of the Armenian writer, scientist, and public figure Perch Proshian. After graduating from high school in 1902 he entered the law faculty at Odessa University, where in 1903 he joined the Party of Socialist Revolutionaries.

In 1905, he was sentenced to 6 years of hard labor for attempting to release political prisoners from an Odessa prison, which he served in Akatuy katorga. In 1910, when he went out to the settlement, he hid from officials and fled to Kazan, Tbilisi, and Baku. In the end he was arrested in Moscow and sentenced a second time to three years of hard labor, which he served in Butyrskaya prison. In 1913 he was exiled to Eastern Siberia, from where he fled abroad. During the First World War, he published internationalist propaganda.

He returned to Russia after the February Revolution and began activist work. At the 3rd Congress of the Socialist-Revolutionary Party, he became one of the leaders of the left opposition. At party forums and in the press, he sharply opposed the imperialist war, coalitions with the bourgeoisie, and demanded an early convocation of the Russian Constituent Assembly.

He was a member of the Regional Executive Committee in Finland, head of the Left Socialist-Revolutionary Committee and faction of the Left Social Revolutionaries in the Helsinki Soviet, editor-publisher of the Socialist-Revolutionary newspaper, was the initiator of concerted action with the Bolsheviks during the July Days. He was arrested by order of the Russian Provisional Government and released after the failure of Kornilov's coup. He took an active part in the preparation of October Revolution, but considered it undesirable to overthrow the Provisional Government before convening the All-Russian Congress of Soviets. By decision of the SR Central Committee, the Left SRs were expelled from the party.

At the Second All-Russian Congress of Soviets of Workers' and Soldiers' Deputies, Proshian was elected to the All-Russian Central Executive Committee. On November 2, he was elected to the Commission which negotiated with the other socialist parties on the formation of a coalition government. He opposed Bolshevik one-party rule of the Council of People's Commissars, and insisted on the creation of a "ministry" of all Soviet parties. At the Left SR congress, Proshian was elected to the Left SR Central Committee. He was a participant in the negotiations between the Left Socialist Revolutionaries and the Bolsheviks, on the unification of the Soviets of Workers 'and Soldiers' Deputies and the Soviets of Peasant Deputies, on the reform of the All-Russian Central Executive Committee, on the conditions for the formation of a "Uniform Socialist Government" and the distribution of positions within it.

On December 23, 1917, Proshian headed the People's Commissariat for Posts and Telegraphs. During his tenure as Commissar (until March 1918) he managed to achieve an end to sabotage of employees; paid great attention to the use of the defense industry in the interests of the development of the industry, the normalization of communications, financial matters and raising wages for the lower categories of employees. Along with his work in the People's Commissariat, he participated in the development of a decree on the organization of the Red Army and the Treaty between Russia and the Finnish Socialist Workers' Republic. In the process of preparing the treaty, he traveled to Finland; on January 16, 1918, he reported to the Sovnarkom on the results of his mission. On February 20, 1918, he was elected to the Provisional Executive Committee of the Council of People's Commissars, amid the invasion of the Austro-German forces. On March 4, 1918, by decree of the Council of People's Commissars, he was appointed political commissar to the Revolutionary Military Council, the organ of strategic leadership of the armed forces of the Soviet Republic.

After the conclusion of the Brest-Litovsk treaty, Proshian left the Sovnarkom in protest, along with other Left Socialist Revolutionaries, while continuing to remain in other Soviet posts.

At the 2nd Left SR Congress (April 17–25, 1918, Moscow), Proshian strove for a breakdown of the world, unleashing a guerrilla-insurgent struggle against German imperialism. At the 3rd Left SR Congress (June 28 – July 1, 1918, Moscow) he was elected to the Central Committee. According to Maria Spiridonova, Proshian was "an internal builder, the main spring, the core of the Left Socialist Revolutionary party".

He was among the leaders of the Left SR uprising, after the suppression of which he went underground. On November 27, 1918, he was sentenced in absentia by a revolutionary tribunal to 3 years in prison. At the 4th Left SR Congress (October 2–7, 1918, Moscow), he delivered a lecture titled "Left Socialist-Revolutionaries and Local Government Power".

Shortly after the congress, he became ill with typhus and was placed in a hospital under a false name (to avoid arrest); but all attempts to save Proshyan's life were unsuccessful, he died on December 16, 1918, and was buried at the Vagankovo Cemetery.
