= Nikolai Glebov-Avilov =

Soviet politician (1887–1937)

- Николай Глебов-Авилов
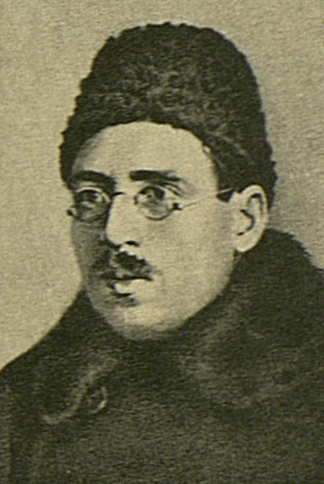

People's Commissar of Posts and Telegraph of the RSFSR
- In office 8 November 1917 – 23 December 1917
- Preceded by: Position established
- Succeeded by: Prosh Proshyan

Personal details
- Born: October 11, 1887 Kaluga, Russian Empire
- Died: March 13, 1937 (aged 49) Moscow, Russian SFSR
- Party: Left SRs

Nikolai Pavlovich Glebov-Avilov (Russian: Никола́й Пáвлович Глéбов-Ави́лов; 11 October 1887 – 13 March 1937) was a prominent Bolshevik revolutionary and the first People's Commissar of Posts and Telegraphs. He was executed during the Great Purge.

== Early career ==
Born in Kaluga in 1887, Glebov-Avilov was the son of a cobbler who started work in a printshop in Kaluga. He became a Bolshevik in 1904, and during the 1905 Revolution he was active in Moscow, Kaluga and the Urals working in underground printshops, being hidden by the All-Russian Union of Railway Workers. From 1908, he was a professional revolutionary, working for the Bolsheviks in Moscow and the Urals. He founded the illegal newspaper The Kaluga Worker (Калужский рабочий). After the Kaluga Bolshevik committee was infiltrated by the police, he was arrested and sentenced to a year and eight months imprisonment in a fortress. Released in 1910, he moved to Moscow, and then enrolled as a student at the party school in Bologna., which was run by the Vpered group, Bolsheviks who followed the lead of Alexander Bogdanov, rather than Vladimir Lenin. Returning to Russia in 1912, Glebov-Avilov was arrested and deported to Tobolsk, but he escaped, moved to Ukraine, and joined the underground party organisation in Kherson. Arrested again, he was deported to Tara, in Siberia. In 1913 he was released under an amnesty to celebrate 300 years of the Romanov dynasty and moved to St Petersburg to work for Pravda (Правда).

Early in 1914, the Bolshevik faction in the state Duma sent him abroad to help organise a party congress, and he met Lenin in Poronin, near Cracow. On his return to Ukraine, he was again arrested and exiled. He escaped again, returned to Moscow, but rearrested and deported to Narym.

== Career from 1917 ==
Glebov-Avilov was finally released from exile by the February Revolution. Returning to Petrograd, he was a delegate to the Bolshevik congress in May 1917, where he was elected an alternate member of the Central Committee. In the summer of 1917 he participated in the Third All Russian Conference of Trade Unions (20–28 June), where he presented the Bolshevik view that:

- Economic Control Commissions should be attached to the central administration of the unions
- These Commissions should be made up of members of the Factory Committee
- These Commissions should co-operate with the Factory Committees in each individual enterprise.
- The Factory Committees should also be financially dependent upon the union.

The Conference adopted the Menshevik position by 76 votes to 63, but contained some inconsistencies: In order to prevent the unions becoming involved in the control of production, they insisted that the factory committees take overall responsibility in this area. At the same time, however, they called on the unions to make the factory committees their supports (opornye punkty) in the various locations, and to use them as implement their policies locally.

After the Bolshevik revolution, Glebov-Avilov was appointed the first People's Commissar for Posts and Telegraphs of the RSFSR. He was replaced on 19 December 1917, when the Bolsheviks formed a short-lived coalition with the Left Socialist revolutionaries. During the civil war, he commanded a flotilla on the Black Sea coast at Chornomorsk. He was assigned the task of scuttling the Black Sea fleet to prevent it falling into the hands of the German army. He then worked in the trade union, and was Ukraine People's Commissar for Labour. In 1924–1925, he was chairman of the Leningrad trade unions, and was sent as the soviet representative to the TUC annual congress in London, on the eve of the General Strike. He supported the Leningrad party leader Grigory Zinoviev against Josif Stalin. At the 14th Party Congress of December 1925, he complained angrily that there were supporters of the left opposition who dared not declare their allegiance because they did not want to be sent to "Murmansk or Turkestan". In 1926, he was dismissed from his post, and was later assigned to work in the Soviet embassy in Rome. In 1928–36, he was Director of the Rostov Agricultural Machine Factory.

Glebov-Avilov was arrested on 19 September 1936 on charges of participating in a counter-revolutionary terrorist organization. He was accused of being a "wrecker". He was sentenced to be shot on 12 March 1937. He was rehabilitated on 7 July 1956.
