= Palace town =

Type of town in the Russian Empire

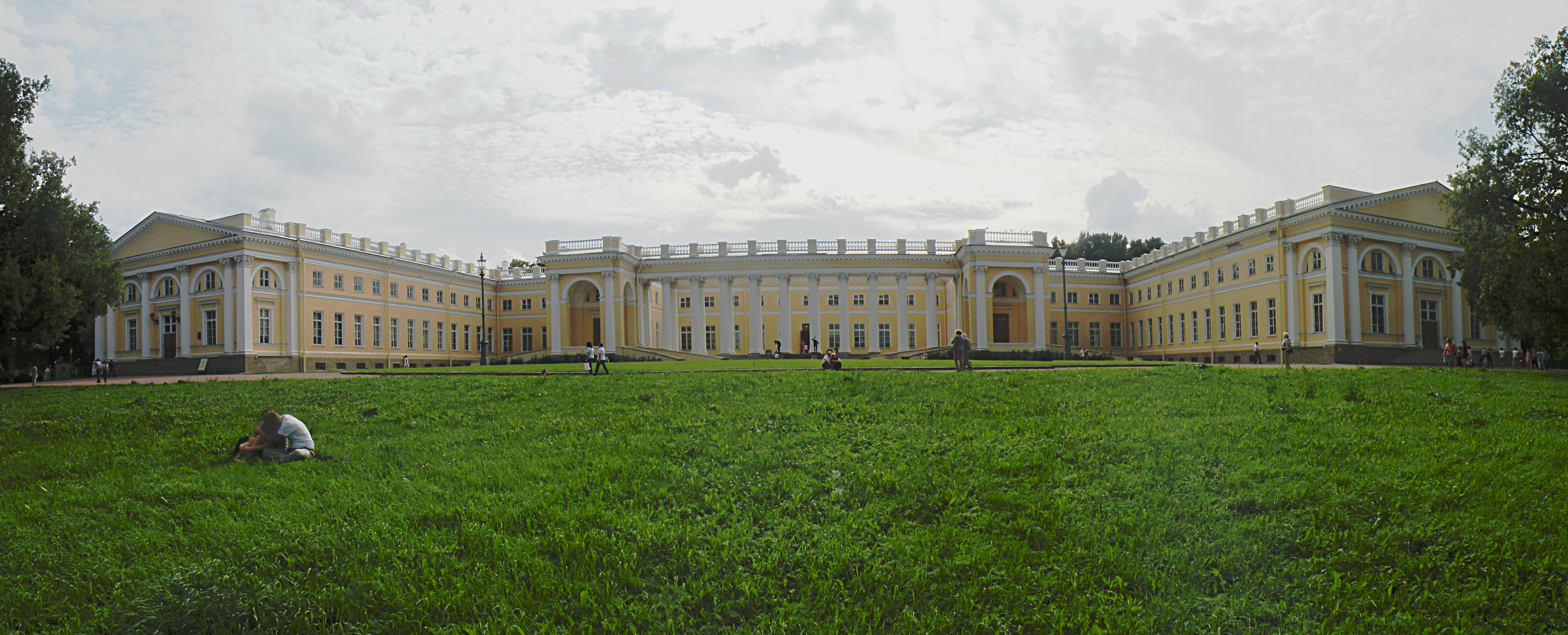
Alexander Palace in Tsarskoye Selo

In the Russian Empire, a palace town was a town with the primary function to maintain imperial residences therein. They were managed by the Ministry of the Imperial Court. Palace towns included Tsarskoye Selo, Gatchina, and Petergof.

== See also ==
- Royal city in Polish–Lithuanian Commonwealth, a historical type of city
- Royal cities in Czech lands
- Royal burgh, in Scotland
