= Alexander Schlichter =

Ukrainian Bolshevik revolutionary, Soviet bureaucrat and academician (1868–1940)

- Александр Шлихтер
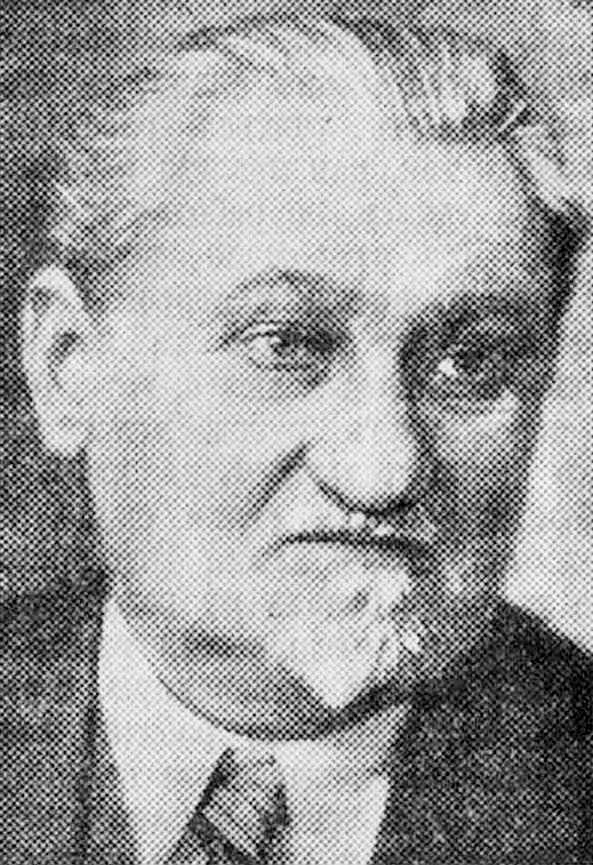
- Schlichter in 1937

People's Commissar of Food of the Russian SFSR
- In office 31 December 1917 – 25 February 1918
- Premier: Vladimir Lenin
- Preceded by: Ivan Teodorovich
- Succeeded by: Alexander Tsiurupa

People's Commissar of Agriculture of the Russian SFSR
- In office 13 November 1917 – 17 November 1917
- Premier: Vladimir Lenin
- Preceded by: Vladimir Milyutin
- Succeeded by: Andrei Kolegayev

Personal details
- Born: 1 September 1868 Lubny, Russian Empire
- Died: 2 December 1940 (aged 72) Kyiv, Ukrainian SSR, Soviet Union
- Resting place: Baikove Cemetery, Kyiv
- Party: RSDLP (1898–1903); RSDLP (Bolsheviks) (1903–1918); Russian Communist Party (1918–1940)
- Education: National University of Kharkiv; University of Bern
- Profession: Professor, economist, political scientist

Alexander Grigorievich Schlichter (Russian: Алексан́др Григо́рьевич Шли́хтер, romanized: Aleksandr Grigoryevich Shlikhter, Ukrainian: Олександр Григорович Шліхтер, romanized: Oleksandr Hryhorovych Shlikhter; 1 September [O.S. 20 August] 1868 – 2 December 1940) was a Ukrainian Bolshevik revolutionary, Soviet politician and academician.

== Family background ==
Schlichter's grandfather, originally from western Germany (Württemberg), settled in what is the present-day Poltava Oblast of Ukraine in 1818. Schlichter was ethnically one-quarter German and three-fourths Ukrainian.

== Career ==
Following studies at Kharkiv University, Schlichter joined a student the social democratic circle in 1891. He was involved in the technical production of the illegal Bolshevik paper Proletary while it appeared in the Russian Empire (1904–1906).

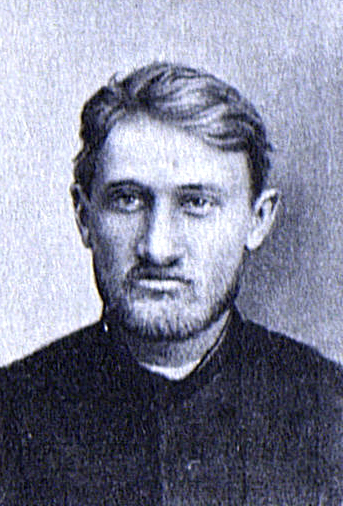
Schlichter in 1917

After the October Revolution he succeeded Vladimir Milyutin as People's Commissar for Agriculture. He also was People's Commissar for Food of the Russian SFSR, Commissar Extraordinary for Food in Siberia. In 1919, he became People's Commissar for Food of Ukraine.

In 1920, he was Chairman of the Tambov Governorate Executive Committee, and was involved in suppression of the Tambov Rebellion.

In April 1927, he attended the Fourth Congress of Soviets as commissar of agriculture in the Ukrainian Republic. There, he described 10% of the rural population of Ukraine as being "surplus".

After 1930 he was mostly involved in scientific activity. He was a full member of the Communist Academy from 1930, an Academician of the Academy of Sciences of the Ukrainian SSR and from 1928, Academician of the Academy of Sciences of the Byelorussian SSR from 1933. He became a Doctor of Economics in 1936. From 1931 to 1938, Schlichter was Vice-President of Ukrainian Academy of Sciences, at the same time the director of the All-Ukrainian Institute of Marxism-Leninism and then president of the All-Ukrainian Association of Marxist–Leninist Institutions (VUAMLIN) from 1930 to 1936.

He was one of the initiators and active supporters of promoting the theories of Trofim Lysenko.
