= Semyon Sereda =

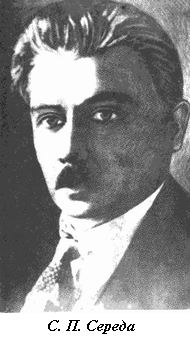

Semyon Pafnutyevich Sereda (Russian: Семён Пафнутьевич Середа; 1 February 1871 – 21 May 1933) was a Russian Bolshevik revolutionary and Soviet politician.

He was the son of a railway employee. From 1896 to 1917 he worked as a statistician. Sereda joined the Bolshevik wing of the Russian Social Democratic Labor Party in 1903.

In 1917, he became a member of the Ryazan gubkom, and from 1 March 1918 until 1 December 1921 served as the Peoples's Commissar for Agriculture. In this capacity he led the grain requisition and punitive operations against peasants in Yeletsky Uyezd of Oryol Governorate in 1918. Sereda was one of the main initiators of the creation of state farms and industrial communities.

From January 1920 he was a member of the Presidium of Supreme Soviet of the National Economy and Gosplan. In 1927 he became Deputy Governor of the Central Statistical Office, USSR.
