= Georgy Oppokov =

Soviet politician (1888–1938)

- Георгий Оппоков
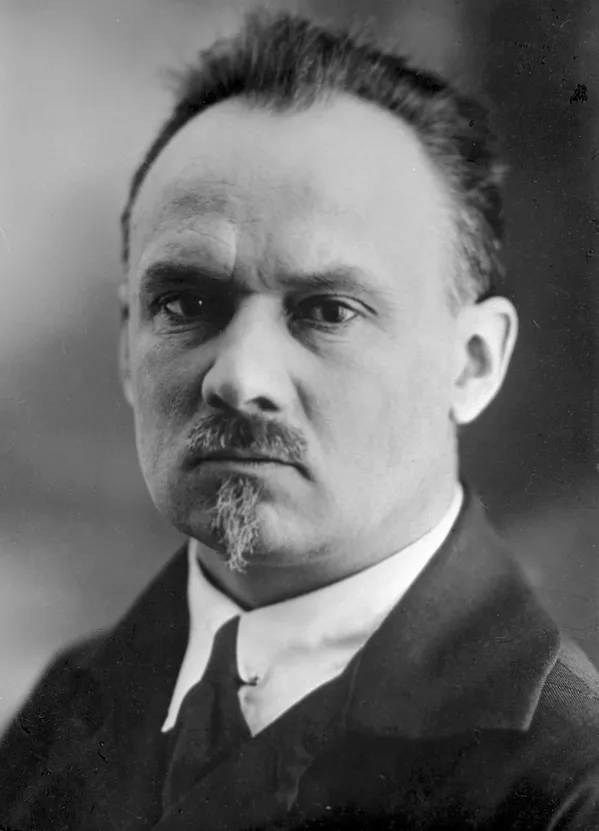
- Oppokov in 1934

People's Commissar for Justice of the Russian SFSR
- In office 8 November 1918 – 29 November 1918
- Premier: Vladimir Lenin
- Preceded by: Office established
- Succeeded by: Pēteris Stučka

Personal details
- Born: 5 February 1888 Saratov, Russian Empire
- Died: 2 September 1937 (aged 49) Moscow, Soviet Union
- Party: RSDLP (Bolsheviks) (1903–1918); Russian Communist Party (1918–1937)
- Occupation: Economist

Georgy Ippolitovich Oppokov (Russian: Гео́ргий Ипполи́тович Оппо́ков; also known as Afanasi Lomov; 28 January 1888 – 2 September 1937) was a prominent Bolshevik leader, Soviet politician and the first People's Commissar for Justice of Soviet Russia.

== Early career ==
Georgi Oppokov was born in Saratov, the son of a bank manager and member of the minor nobility. He joined the Bolsheviks as a schoolboy, in 1903, and led a combat squad in Saratov during the 1905 revolution. In 1907–08, he was a member of the Moscow committee of the Russian Social Democratic Labour Party. Arrested in July 1910, he was exiled to the Arkhangelsk region for three years. Released in February 1913, under an amnesty to mark the tricentenary of the Romanov dynasty, he returned to Moscow, and was one of the founders of the metal workers' union. He was expelled from Moscow in 1914, and returned to Saratov, where he was arrested in April 1916, and deported to Irkutsk.

== Post-revolutionary Career ==
After the February Revolution, in 1917, Oppokov returned to Moscow, and under the name 'Lomov' was elected a candidate member of the Central Committee of the Bolsheviks at the Sixth Party Congress in August 1917. As one of its youngest members, he was a keen backer of Vladimir Lenin's call for a second revolution. On October 3, speaking on behalf of the Moscow Regional Party Committee, while Lenin was in hiding, he delivered a sharp rebuke to fellow members of the Central Committee for wavering on this issue. After the Bolshevik Revolution in November 1917, he was appointed People's Commissar for Justice, but surrendered this post when the Bolsheviks entered into a brief coalition with the Left Socialist Revolutionaries. He was also a Bolshevik candidate in the 1917 Russian Constituent Assembly election, being fielded in the Arkhangelsk constituency. In December he was appointed a member of the Supreme Economic Council (Vesenkha).

From January 1918, Lomov was a supporter of the Left Communists, led by Nikolai Bukharin, who opposed the Brest-Litovsk Treaty, proposing instead to fight a 'revolutionary war' against Germany. On 23 February, along with Bukharin and others, he resigned from all his posts to campaign against the treaty, but his resignation was not accepted, and in March, he was re-elected a candidate member of the Central Committee. In March 1918 he was ousted from his leading position in Vesenkha, but was later placed in charge of its timber administration, and was responsible for timber supplies throughout the Russian Civil War. In 1921–23, he was based in Siberia, as a member of the economic council. In 1923, he was appointed head of the Oil Syndicate.

Abandoning his former allegiance to the left, he supported Joseph Stalin against Leon Trotsky in the rift that followed Lenin's death, and having been dropped from the Central Committee, he was returned as a full member in December 1927. In 1931–34, he was deputy head of Gosplan. In February 1934, he was appointed a member of the bureau of the Central Control Commission.

== Arrest and Death ==
In June 1937, one of Lomov's colleagues in Gosplan wrote to Stalin denouncing Lomov as someone who had been friendly with Bukharin. Stalin forwarded the note to Vyacheslav Molotov asking "What to do?". Molotov responded: "I'm for arresting this bastard Lomov immediately." He was arrested on 25 June, and shot on 2 September 1937.

== Family ==
Lomov's wife, Natalya, was arrested on 17 July 1937 and sentenced to eight years in a labour camp for not reporting her husband's 'criminal activities'. She was released early, in 1940, but rearrested in 1941 and sentenced to 10 years in the labour camps, then arrested for the third time in 1949. She was 'rehabilitated' in December 1954. Their daughter, Nina, a student at the Moscow Institute of Foreign Languages was arrested at the age of 20, in June 1939, and sentenced to three years in a labour camp.

== Personality ==
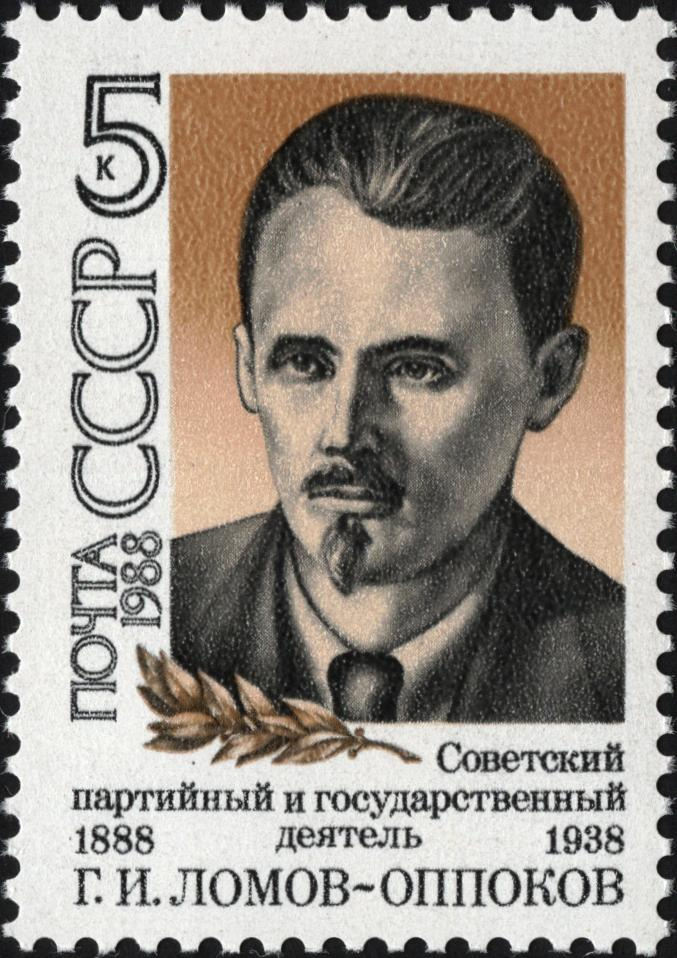
Soviet 1988 stamp with an image of Oppokov celebrating his 100th birthday

Simon Liberman, a Menshevik who worked for the timber trust described Lomov as "an honest, direct man with old-fashioned ideas about the comradeship of the revolutionary circles and about the morals of the revolution itself" adding:

He looked every inch a nihilist out of Turgenev's pages. He was an idealist, and with fire and passion he would argue in defence of any theory that was questioned by anyone in sight. He was tall; his features were fine; his forehead was high beneath his unruly hair. His gestures and movements were clumsy, possibly because of his natural shyness.

Lomov/Oppokov was posthumously rehabilitated in 1956. The circumstances of his arrest were revealed by the former head of the KGB, Alexander Shelepin, in his speech to the 22nd Congress in 1961.
