= Vladimir Milyutin =

Russian Bolshevik revolutionary and Soviet bureaucrat (1884–1937)

- Владимир Милютин
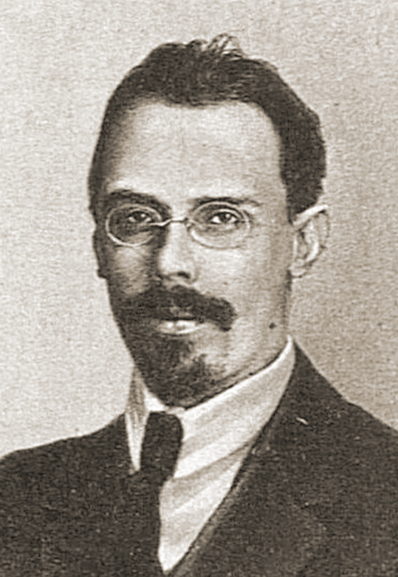
- Milyutin in 1926

Chairman of the Supreme Soviet of National Economy of the RSFSR
- In office 23 March 1918 – 3 April 1918
- Premier: Vladimir Lenin
- Preceded by: Valerian Osinsky
- Succeeded by: Alexei Rykov

People's Commissar of Agriculture of the RSFSR
- In office 8 November 1917 – 17 November 1917
- Premier: Vladimir Lenin
- Preceded by: Position established
- Succeeded by: Alexander Schlichter

Personal details
- Born: 5 September 1888 Aleksandrovo, Russian Empire
- Died: 30 October 1937 (aged 53) Moscow, Russian SFSR, Soviet Union
- Party: RSDLP (1903–1918); Russian Communist Party (Bolsheviks) (1918–1937)

Vladimir Pavlovich Milyutin (Russian: Влади́мир Па́влович Милю́тин; 5 September 1884 – 30 October 1937) was a Russian Bolshevik revolutionary and Soviet bureaucrat who was People's Commissar for Agriculture in the original Soviet government formed on the day of the October Revolution but resigned in protest against Vladimir Lenin's initial decision to form a government without the other parties.

== Early career ==
Milyutin was born in the village of Aleksandrovo in the Russian Empire's Kursk Governorate to a rural teacher's family. His mother, who was a distant relative of the poet Nikolay Yazykov, was banned from teaching for her anti-tsarist views. Milyutin joined the Russian Social Democratic Labour Party (RSDLP) in 1903, and was initially a Menshevik. His membership of the Bolshevik Party was postdated only until 1910, implying that he did not join the Bolshevik faction of the RSDLP until that year. He was a conciliator who hoped to reunite the disparate parts of the party, and in that capacity was co-opted to the Central Committee in 1910 but arrested almost immediately afterwards. After the February Revolution, he was elected chairman of the Saratov Soviet. In August 1917, he was elected a member of the Central Committee of the RSDLP(b), and was based in St Petersburg as one of the most active Bolshevik leaders for the next three months.

One week before the Bolshevik Revolution, on 29 October, when Lenin emerged from hiding to urge the Central Committee to ready itself to seize power immediately, Milyutin was the first speaker to oppose him, arguing that power should be—and was being—transferred to the soviets, and not exclusively to the Bolsheviks, and that "we (the Bolsheviks) are not ready to strike the first blow; we are unable to depose and arrest the authorities in the immediate future." He accepted the majority decision, and played a central role in the Bolshevik bloodless coup in charge of food supplies. On 7 November, he was named People's Commissar for Agriculture in the original Bolshevik government but resigned ten days later, along with Lev Kamenev and three others, who called for the Bolsheviks to form a coalition government with the other socialist parties represented in the soviets. They withdrew their resignations on 12 December. On 15 December, Milyutin and Kamenev were elected to the steering committee of the Bolshevik faction in the Constituent Assembly. Nine days later, the entire steering committee (which included Joseph Stalin) was sacked for being too conciliatory towards the other socialist parties.

== Later career ==
After his reinstatement, Milyutin never intentionally deviated from the party line again. He advocated ending workers' control of factories, which had sprung up spontaneously during the revolution, because it disrupted production. He also opposed Leon Trotsky over the issue of importance of economic planning, which Milyutin disparaged to the extent that Lenin publicly accused him in an article published in Pravda in February 1921 of writing "twaddle" and exhibiting "highbrow disdain" for practical achievements. He inadvertently again offended Lenin in autumn 1922 by proposing an end to the state monopoly on foreign trade, arguing that private cross-border commerce would boost the soviet economy, and reduce smuggling.

Appointed director of the Central Statistical Administration in 1928, Milyutin loyally supported Stalin during the drive to force the peasants to move onto collective farms, and despite his previous opposition to economic planning became an enthusiastic supporter for the first Five Year Plan, "adept at the timely expression of opinions held at the highest level in the party".

== Arrest and execution ==
Milyutin was arrested on 26 July 1937 during the Great Purge on accounts of belonging to a secret counter revolutionary organization, and was sentenced to death on 29 October 1937. Before his execution, as was customary, he was photographed for the archives of the NKVD. That last photograph was published by David King in his book Ordinary Citizens. He was rehabilitated in 1956.

== Works ==
- Narodnoe khoziaistvo sovetskoi Rossii [National Economy of Soviet Russia] Moscow, 1920.
- The Economic Organisation of Soviet Russia: A Brief Sketch of the Organisation and the Present Situation of Industry in Russia. London: Communist Party of Great Britain, [1920].
