= Vladimir Karelin =

Russian revolutionary

- Владимир Карелин
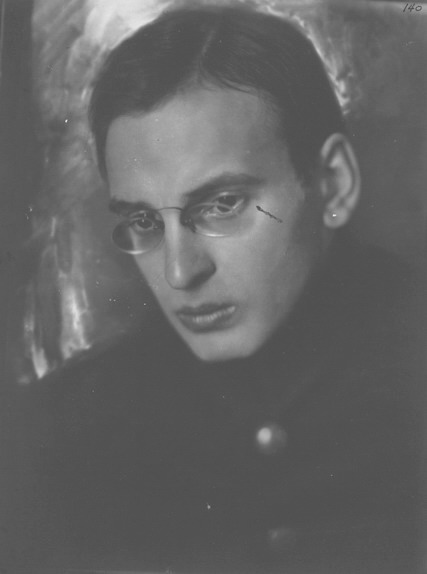
- Karelin in 1917

People's Commissar of Properties of the RSFSR
- In office December 9, 1917 – March 18, 1918
- Prime Minister: Vladimir Lenin
- Preceded by: Office established
- Succeeded by: Pavel Malinovsky

Personal details
- Born: February 23, 1891 Smolensk, Russian Empire
- Died: September 22, 1938 (aged 47) Kiev, Ukrainian Soviet Socialist Republic, Soviet Union

Vladimir Aleksandrovich Karelin (February 23, 1891 – September 22, 1938) was a Russian revolutionary, one of the organizers of the Left Socialist Revolutionary Party and a member of its Central Committee, and People's Commissar of Properties of the Russian Socialist Federative Soviet Republic from December 1917 to March 1918.

== Biography ==
Born into a noble family, his father was a government employee. Karelin joined the Socialist Revolutionary Party in 1907. He graduated from two courses of the Law Faculty of Moscow University. He was under police surveillance, spent a year in prison and a further five years in exile due to his revolutionary activities. In 1913 and 1914, he was an employee of the newspaper "Smolensky Vestnik", and from 1915 to 1916, the Kharkiv newspaper "Morning". After the February Revolution of 1917, he was one of the leaders of the organization of the Party of Socialist Revolutionaries of Kharkiv. In July 1917, he became the Chairman of the Kharkiv City Duma. He was a participant in the Democratic Conference, and was additionally a member of the Council of Elders of the Pre–Parliament.

After the October Revolution, he was a supporter of the creation of a homogeneous socialist government with the participation of Mensheviks and Socialist Revolutionaries.

The isolation of the Bolsheviks is fatal. Our main idea is to create a democratic government body. We are now playing the role of conciliators and this role must not be lost. We must invite the Bolsheviks to form a bloc of revolutionary democracy, and we will enter into this bloc.

— Vladimir Karelin

At the Second All–Russian Congress of Soviets, he was elected to the Presidium of the All–Russian Central Executive Committee representing the left Socialist Revolutionaries. At the founding congress of the Left Socialist Revolutionary Party (November 19–27), he was elected a member of the Central Committee. Karelin was one of the seven Left Socialist Revolutionaries who joined the Council of People's Commissars of the Russian Socialist Federative Soviet Republic in December 1917. He took the post of People's Commissar of the Property of the Russian Socialist Federative Soviet Republic, and was a member of the collegium of the People's Commissariat of Justice. He was elected a deputy of the Constituent Assembly for the Kharkiv Electoral District. In January 1918, he participated as a member of the delegation in the peace negotiations in Brest–Litovsk. In March 1918, due to his opposition to the signing of the Treaty of Brest-Litovsk, he resigned from the Council of People's Commissars.

Karelin continued to remain a member of the All–Russian Central Executive Committee, defending the position of the Left Socialist Revolutionaries at meetings. In the second half of March, he went to the south of Russia and Ukraine to agitate against the Brest Peace. In the spring and summer of 1918, he was a candidate for the Bureau For the Leadership Of the Insurrectionary Struggle, the "Insurrectionary Nine", formed by the Ukrainian Central Executive Committee.

He was one of the organizers and an active participant in the uprising of the Left Socialist Revolutionaries on July 6–7, 1918 in Moscow. After the defeat of the uprising, he went into hiding and in December 1918, he left for Ukraine. The Bolsheviks sentenced Karelin in absentia to three years in prison. In February 1919, in Kharkiv, he was arrested by the Extraordinary Commission, taken to Moscow, and released in October of that same year. Karelin ultimately abandoned the struggle against the Bolsheviks. Beginning in 1921, he worked as a lawyer in various institutions in Kharkiv.

In 1937, he was a legal adviser to Gidrostroy (Kharkiv). He was arrested on September 26, 1937. In March 1938 he was coerced into being a witness at the trial of the "Right Trotskyist Anti–Soviet Bloc". He testified about the alleged conspiracy in 1918 of Bukharin as the leader of the left communists, with the leaders of the Left Socialist Revolutionaries aiming to seize power from the Bolsheviks. On September 22, 1938, Karelin was sentenced by the Military Collegium of the Supreme Court of the Soviet Union to capital punishment and was shot on the same day. Karelin was posthumously rehabilitated in 1993, after the fall of the Soviet Union.

== Sources ==
- Anatoly Razgon. Forgotten Names // First Soviet Government. Moscow: Publishing House of Political Literature of the Central Committee of the Communist Party of the Soviet Union, 1991. Pages 448–459
- Lev Protasov. People of the Constituent Assembly: A Portrait in the Interior of the Era. Moscow, Russian Political Encyclopedia, 2008
- Political Figures of Russia in 1917. Biographical Dictionary. Moscow: 1993
