= Mark Yelizarov =

Russian and Soviet politician (1863–1919)

- Марк Елизаров
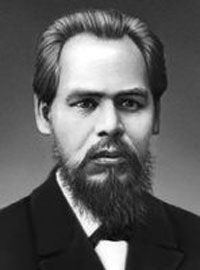
- Yelizarov in 1918

People's Commissar of Railways of the RSFSR
- In office 21 November 1917 – 20 January 1918
- Preceded by: Position established
- Succeeded by: Veniamin Sverdlov

Personal details
- Born: 22 March 1863 Bestuzhevka village, Samara province, Russian Empire
- Died: 10 March 1919 (aged 56) Petrograd, Russian Soviet Federative Socialist Republic
- Resting place: Literatorskiye Mostki, Saint Petersburg
- Party: RSDLP (1898–1903); RSDLP (Bolsheviks) (1903–1918); Russian Communist Party (Bolsheviks) (1918–1919)
- Spouse: Anna Ulyanova (m. 1889)

Mark Timofeevich Yelizarov (Russian: Марк Тимофеевич Елизаров; 22 March [O.S. 10 March] 1863 – 10 March 1919) was a Russian revolutionary and Soviet statesman who served as the first People's Commissar of Railways of the Russian Soviet Federative Socialist Republic.

== Biography ==
Yelizarov was born in to the family of a foreman who was a former serf. In 1882 he graduated from the Samara men's gymnasium. At a village meeting of Bestuzhevka, the headman was allowed to dismiss him from the peasant class, which allowed a native of a peasant family to enter the physics and mathematics faculty of St. Petersburg University, from which Yelizarov graduated in 1886.

He was close to the Ulyanov family, mostly Alexander Ulyanov and through him became active in the revolutionary movement from a young age. Yelizarov was a member of a social democratic circle from 1893 and later joined the newly formed the Russian Social Democratic Labour Party in 1898. He conducted party work in St. Petersburg and in Moscow in the Moscow Workers' Union as well in Samara. He was arrested for his revolutionary activities in 1901 and exiled for two years in Syzran. In 1905, in St. Petersburg, he was a member of the organization bureau of the 1st All-Russian Railway Congress and headed the Uzlov strike committee for which he was arrested and exiled for three years again in Syzran under police surveillance.

In 1906, he moved back to Samara and joined the local RSDLP committee and worked as a journalist for newspapers, however he was not involved in revolutionary activities anymore. From 1906 to 1916 Yelizarov worked at different insurance companies and later became the managing director of the St. Petersburg shipping company On the Volga.

After the October Revolution, Yelizarov was appointed at the vacant position of People's Commissar of Railways of the RSFSR and became its first Commissar, according to the Vikhzel quota, from 28 November 1917 to February 1918. In April 1918 he became the Chief Commissioner for Insurance and Fire Fighting.

In January 1919 Yelizarov became a member of the Collegium of the People's Commissariat of Trade and Industry acting as the deputy People's Commissar, a position he held until he died from typhus in March of the same year.

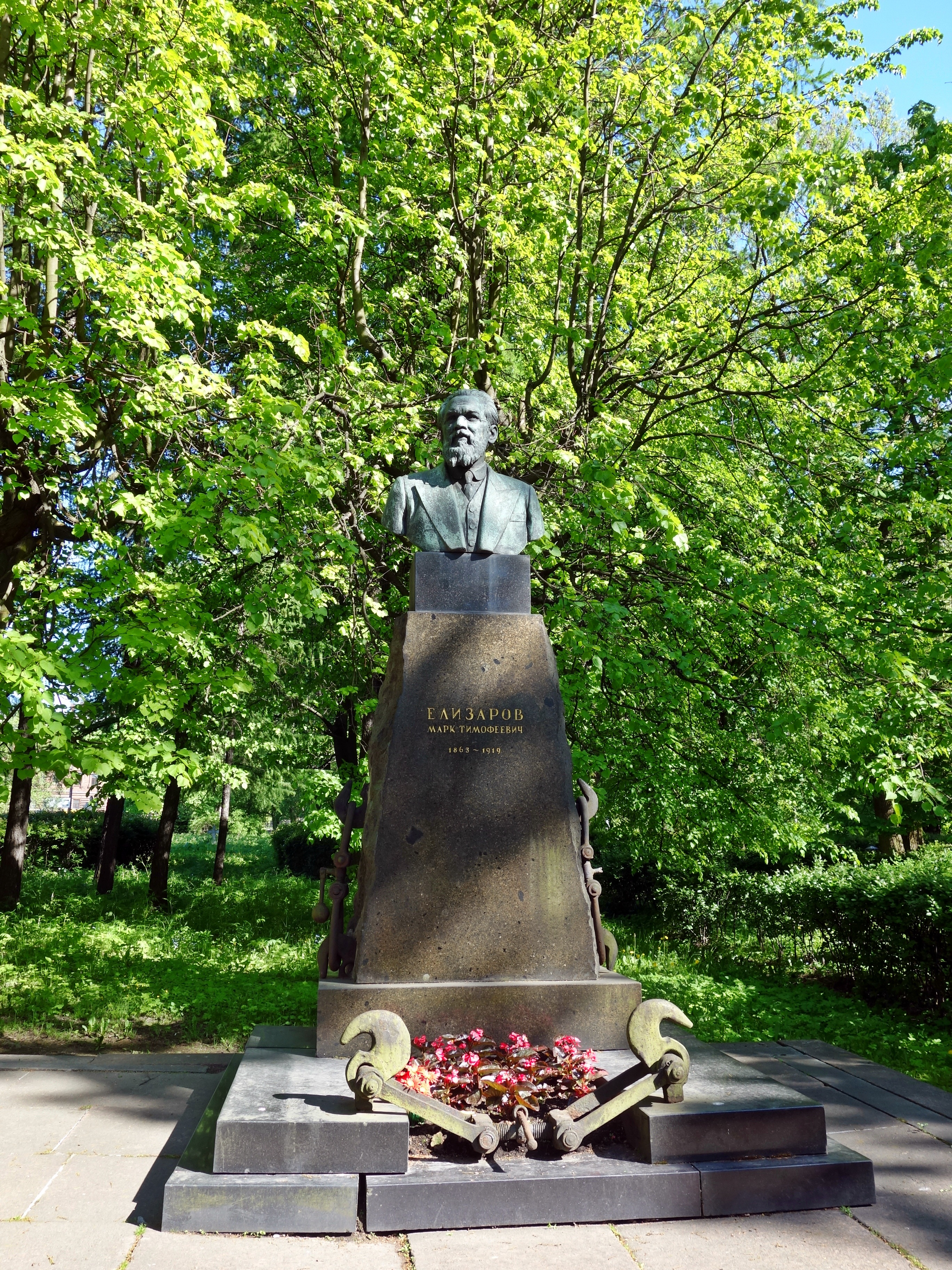
Yelizarov's grave on Literatorskie Mostki in Volkovo Cemeter, St. Petersburg

Yelizarov was buried at the Volkovo Cemetery.

== Family ==
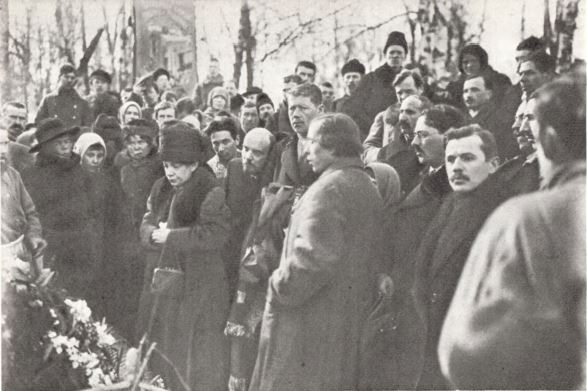
Vladimir Lenin and Anna Yelizarova at the funeral of Mark Elizarov at the Volkovo cemetery.

Yelizarov married Anna Ilyinichna Ulyanova, Vladimir Lenin's older sister in 1899. They adopted one child, the future Soviet writer Georgy Lozgachev.
