= Valerian Andreyevich Osinsky =

Russian revolutionary

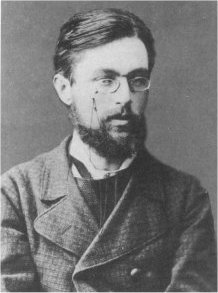
Valerian Osinsky

Valerian Andreyevich Osinsky (Russian: Валериан Андреевич Осинский; 10 November [O.S. 29 October] 1852 – 14 June 1879) was a Russian revolutionary who was one of the first to resort to using political violence, and one of the first to be executed.

== Career ==
Osinsky was born into the Russian nobility, in Rostov-on-Don, which at that time was part of the Yekaterinoslav Governorate. He graduated from the Taganrog gymnasium, and from the St Petersburg railway institution, in 1871–72. After returning to Rostov, he was secretary of the city duma administration. His brother was President of the local administration. Using his position, he was able to encourage Rostov's factory workers to demand better conditions, with the help of sympathetic employers and members of the local administration, until the movement was uncovered by the police, and he was advised to leave Rostov. He moved to St Petersburg to make contact with members of Zemlya i Volya, and became one of that organisation's leading agents in the south.

Believing he knew the identity of the worker who had betrayed them to the police, Osinsky arranged for the suspected spy to be killed, in February 1878, by two revolutionaries named Ivan Ivichevich and Rostislav Steblin-Kamensky. After the killing, posters were put up across Rostov, purporting to have been produced by the 'Executive Committee of the Socialist Revolutionary Party" warning: "Such is the fate that awaits every Judas."

After that killing, Osinsky moved to Kyiv, where he and Ivichevich and a third member of the self proclaimed Socialist Revolutionary party, Aleksei Medvedev-Fomin, approached a vice-prosecutor named Kotlyarevsky, who had been conducting inquiries into the revolutionaries, and fired six shots at him, but missed.

Later in 1878, Osinsky and Mikhail Frolenko successfully carried out a plan to rescue three revolutionaries, Leo Deutsch, Yakov Stefanovich and Ivan Bokhanovsky from Kiev jail. Frolenko worked from the inside, after obtaining a job as a warder, while Osinsky organised the getaway.

In May 1878, an official of the Kyiv police named Baron Geyking was assassinated by Grigori Popko, another member of the 'Socialist Revolutionary Party'. He was replaced by Georgy Sudeykin, who put two spies on Osinsky's trail.

== Arrest and execution ==
Osinsky was arrested in a Kyiv street in January 1879 along with Sophia Leshern, who was reputedly his lover, and Ignat Voloshenko. They were armed, and fired on the police. In May, Osinsky was tried with 13 others by a military court. He and three others were sentenced to death, and the others to hard labour. The death sentence passed on Sophia Leshern was commuted, because she was a woman. Osinsky, Ludwig Brandler, and V. Sviridenko were hanged in front of a crowd of about 30 outside Kyiv prison. This form of execution meant that they were slowly strangled to death. Osinsky was made to watch others being hanged before he was executed.

== Legacy ==
Osinsky was popular and respected in the revolutionary underground. Lev Tolstoy counted him among the “highly moral, self-sacrificing, good people”. Valerian Obolensky (1887–1938), Bolshevik revolutionary and later high-ranking Soviet politician, adopted the party name N. Osinsky in honor of Valerian Osinsky.
