= Andrei Kolegayev =

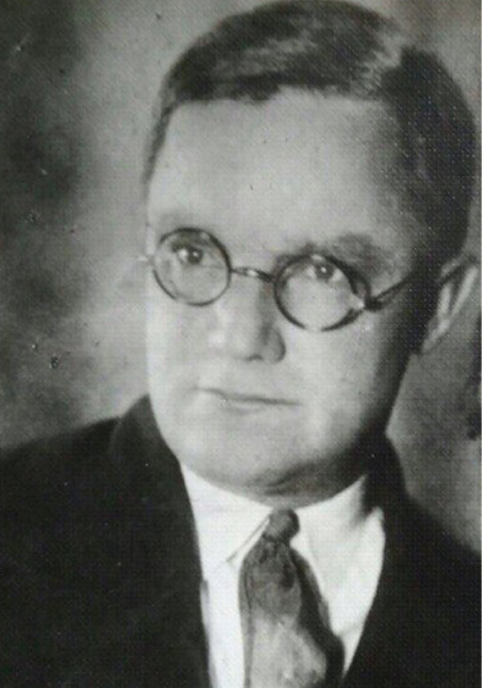
Andrei Lukic Kolegaev

Andrei Lukic Kolegayev (Russian: Андрей Лукич Колегаев) (22 March 1887 – 23 March 1937) was a Left Socialist-Revolutionary and later Soviet statesman who advocated an alliance with the Bolsheviks.

He was born in Surgut, Tobolsk Governorate in the family of an exiled Narodnaya Volya revolutionary. Kolegayev joined the Socialist-Revolutionaries in 1906 and the following year he was expelled from Kharkov University. He was arrested four times and spent seven years in exile. He participated in the October Revolution and was a delegate to the Second All-Russian Congress of Soviets.

He was People's Commissar for Agriculture from 23 December 1917 to 1 March 1918. The officials of the former Ministry of the Interim Government sabotaged the decisions the new government and declared a strike. He was given the post of Commissar of Agriculture, as he was a Left SR.

In November 1918 he broke with the Left SRs and joined the Russian Communist Party (bolsheviks). During 1918–1920 he was chairman of the Special prodkomissii and member of FAR Southern Front and in 1920–21 a member of the panel Narkomata communication.

He was arrested as part of the Great Purge on 23 March 1936 and shot on 23 March 1937. He was posthumously rehabilitated in 1957.
