= Sergei Bessonov =

Soviet politician (1892–1941)

Sergey Bessonov
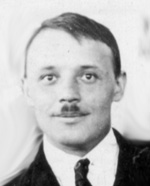
- Born: 6 August 1892; Kirzhach, Vladimir Governorate, Russian Empire
- Died: 11 September 1941 (aged 49); Oryol, Oryol Oblast, Russian SFSR, Soviet Union

Sergei Alexeyevich Bessonov (Russian: Серге́й Алексе́евич Бессо́нов; 6 August 1892 – 11 September 1941) was a Soviet state, public and party activist and diplomat. He was one of the defendants in the Case of the Anti-Soviet "Bloc of Rightists and Trotskyites" of 2–13 March 1938. He was one of only three defendants who did not receive the death penalty. Sentenced to 15 years in prison, he was extrajudicially executed by the NKVD during Operation Barbarossa of the Eastern Front of World War II alongside Olga Kameneva, Christian Rakovsky, and Maria Spiridonova in Oryol Oblast.

== See also ==
- Medvedev Forest massacre
