= Irina Kakhovskaya =

Narodnik-inspired Russian revolutionary

Irina Konstantinovna Kakhovskaya
- Born: August 15, 1887; Tarashcha, Kiev Governorate, Russian Empire
- Died: March 1, 1960 (aged 72); Maloyaroslavets, Kaluga Oblast, Russian Soviet Federative Socialist Republic, Soviet Union
- Citizenship: Soviet Union; Russian Empire
- Occupations: Revolutionary, memoirist, translator
- Parents: Konstantin Kakhovsky (father); Augusta Fedorovna (mother)

Irina Konstantinovna Kakhovskaya (Russian: Ири́на Константи́новна Кахо́вская; 15 August 1887, Tarashcha, Kiev Governorate – 1 March 1960, Maloyaroslavets, Kaluga Oblast) was a Narodnik-inspired Russian revolutionary. Grandniece of the Decembrist Pyotr Kakhovsky, she was a representative of the Left Socialist-Revolutionaries during the Russian Revolution: in 1918 she organized the assassination of Field Marshal Hermann von Eichhorn, commander of the German occupation forces in Ukraine. In total she spent forty-five years of her life in prison and exile, both under the Tsarist and Soviet regimes, as well as briefly at the end of World War I in German military jail.

== Biography ==
=== Early life ===
She was born into the family of a land surveyor and a national teacher. From 28 August 1897 to 25 May 1903, she studied at the Mariinsky Institute for Orphans of Noble Birth in Saint Petersburg, from which she graduated with a silver medal. Then she entered the historical and philological department of the Women's Pedagogical Institute.

=== Political commitment and first imprisonment ===
Since 1905, she was carried away by revolutionary ideas after she heard the speech of Maxim Gorky. Probably thanks also to her acquaintance with Alexandra Kollontai, for some time she supported the ideas of social democracy and briefly sided with the Bolsheviks in Saint Petersburg, becoming secretary of their local district organisation. Soon Kakhovskaya changed her views and joined the far-left Union of Socialist Revolutionary Maximalists. In the summer of 1906, she carried on revolutionary propaganda among the peasants in the villages of the Samara Governorate.

On 28 April 1907 she was first arrested in St. Petersburg by the Okhrana. The St. Petersburg Military District Court on 7 March 1908 sentenced her to hard labour for a period of 20 years. When the verdict was approved, the term was reduced to 15 years. She served her sentence first in the Novinsky Women's Prison in Moscow, then was sent to the Maltsev Prison of the Nerchinsk Katorga in Transbaikal, where she arrived on 16 July 1908. The famous Shesterka, the "Six" Socialist Revolutionary women (Maria Spiridonova, Anastasia Bitsenko, Aleksandra Izmailovich, Revekka Fialka, Lydia Yezerskaya, Maria Shkolnik) were already in the Nerchinsk Katorga: their slow train journey across Russia in 1906 had lasted around a month and turned into a kind of triumphal progress. She formed a special friendship with Spiridonova and Izmailovich, a bond of political and personal sisterhood that would last throughout their lives.

Kakhovskaya described the prison situation as follows:

At first, my thoughts were filled with images of friends and nature, dreams of escape. We wrote long letters to friends that had to be torn at once, or sat endlessly solving algebraic or geometric problems, all to avoid thinking, to kill time and prepare ourselves for a night's sleep, which we hoped would be filled with beautiful dreams.

— I. Kakhovskaya, "Iz Vospominaniy o Zhenskoy Katorge" ['From Reminiscences of Women's Katorga'], Katorga i ssylka, 1926, 1 (22)

To support her daughter, Kakhovskaya's mother moved to Siberia, illegally handing letters to political convicts. In 1914, Irina Kakhovskaya was amnestied, and her prison term was converted into internal exile first to Buryatia then back to Transbaikal.

=== Russian Revolution ===
After the outbreak of the 1917 February Revolution, the other political prisoners from the Nerchinsk Katorga were released as well and she collaborated with Maria Spiridonova in the creation of the Chita Committee of the Party of Socialist Revolutionaries. In May they both traveled from Siberia to Moscow along with other former prison companions to attend the party's 3rd National Congress. They were greeted with ovations, but none of them were elected to the governing Central Committee. In the aftermath of the October Revolution Kakhovskaya participated in the secession of the Left Socialist-Revolutionaries from their old party, and represented them in the presidium of the Second All–Russian Congress of Soviets.

After the Central Committee of the new party resolved to resume the "terrorist fight" against the implementation of the Treaty of Brest-Litovsk in 1918, Irina Kakhovskaya and her lover and party comrade Boris Donskoy were tasked with preparing an attempt on the life of Field Marshal Hermann von Eichhorn, who led the German military occupation in Ukraine, as well as on puppet Hetman Pavlo Skoropadskyi's. During June, Kakhovskaya and Donskoy conducted surveillance, trying to establish the most successful time and place for the murder of the German Marshal, who was considered a ruthless tyrant. It was decided that Donskoy would kill him. Historian Margaret Maxwell wrote that a Narodnik-inspired revolutionary murder was regarded as a possible tragic necessity that could desirably be atoned for by the revolutionary's own death. On 30 July, Donskoy met a stranger who asked to show him the direction to the residence of General Eichhorn. Donskoy followed him, after a while there was an explosion: Eichhorn was killed. Kakhovskaya decided to fulfill the order to the end and kill Hetman, which was scheduled for the funeral of the German General, but Skoropadsky left the funeral before her arrival. After the failure, Kakhovskaya with two comrades went to spend the night in a country house, where she was ambushed by the Germans. She was tortured and interrogated and then sent to prison and sentenced to death. While awaiting the approval of the verdict by the Kaiser, she spent several months in the German Commandant's Office at the Lukyanovskaya Prison. During her imprisonment, the November Revolution began in Germany, but she was only released on 24 January 1919, after several campaigns in support of her liberation.

In 1919, she was arrested by the Cheka, but was released two months later thanks to the intervention of Lenin, as it became known that she was plotting the assassination of General Denikin, an enemy of both parties. Denikin's assassination never took place due to the fact that her assistants fell ill with typhus. In Rostov, where the attempt was to take place, Irina continued to promote the ideas of Left Socialist Revolutionaries.

=== Soviet prisons and internal exile ===
After her return to Moscow, she too suffered from typhus and was arrested again at the beginning of 1921: despite the fact that she was already sitting in Butyrka Prison during the Kronstadt rebellion, she was found guilty of complicity in it and sentenced to exile in Kaluga in 1922.

In 1923 her memoir of the attacks on Eichorn and Denikin appeared in Berlin and was later translated into French and published in Paris with a foreword by Romain Rolland.

In March 1925, Kakhovskaya was arrested yet again under the charge not only of trying to revive the left–wing Socialist Revolutionary organization in Kaluga, but also of ideological leadership of the student organization "Revolutionary Avant–Garde". A special session at the Collegium of the Joint State Political Directorate (OGPU) condemned Kakhovskaya to 3 years in a concentration camp with a replacement for expulsion to Vyatka for the same period. But at the request of Ekaterina Peshkova, instead of Vyatka, she was sent to Stavropol-on-Volga, and from there she was transferred to Samarkand, where she joined up with Maria Spiridonova and Alexandra Izmailovich, who were previously exiled there. Their term of exile having been extended, in 1928 Kakhovskaya, Izmailovich and Spiridonova moved to Tashkent, where they earned a living by technical translations from English, and gave private lessons.

In the early 1930s, they were re-arrested and exiled to Ufa, where they formed a sort of commune, also including Spiridonova's husband, Ilya Mayorov, his invalid father and teenaged son, and Kakhovskaya's elderly aunt. In February 1937, the whole group was hauled in by the NKVD and detained for several months under the charge of havig attempted to create a united counterrevolutionary centre and having carried out terrorist acts against the Communist leaders of Bashkiria. While they were held and subjected to harsh interrogations, however, "the entire Bashkir government itself was arrested, so charges of plots against Stalin and Politburo member Klementi Voroshilov were substituted." On 25 December 1937, in a closed session of the Military Collegium of the Supreme Court of the Soviet Union on the fabricated case of the All–Union Socialist Revolutionary Center, Kakhovskaya was sentenced to 10 years in prison. Izmailovich was also sentenced to 10 years, Spiridonova to 25. According to Kakhovskaya's report, her own hearing lasted no longer than seven minutes. All three refused either to confess anything or to accuse anybody. Mayorov alone was forced into tearfully signing a guilty confession under the threat of sentencing his sick father and young son to hard labour. Izmailovich, Spiridonova and Mayorov were to be executed by order of Stalin in 1941 in the Medvedevsky Forest massacre

After a short stay in the Yaroslavl and Vladimir Prisons, in 1939, Kakhovskaya was sent to the Krasnoyarsk Camp, where for 7 years she worked exclusively in general work: forestry and agricultural work. She was released in February 1947, lived in Kansk, where she was last arrested in early January 1948, was held in the Krasnoyarsk Prison, after which in 1949, she was returned to Kansk as an exile.

=== Last years ===
In 1954, she was released from exile and, the next year, she moved to Maloyaroslavets, where she was engaged, amongst other things, in translating the fairy tale by Antoine de Saint-Exupéry The Little Prince (unpublished).

In 1957, she was rehabilitated in the 1937 case, as was Izmailovich, but steadfast Kakhovskaya kept insisting in vain on the full rehabilitation of both her slain comrades. In November 1958, at the age of 71, she would have a memoir she called Notes and Explanations ("Zapiski i Zaiavleniia") sent on to the Central Committee of the Communist party, to the Council of Ministers, and to the Office of the Public Prosecutor, with the sole aim of keeping alive the memory of her comrades' late years. It was mainly to her credit that this memory was not completely lost. Notwithstanding, Alexandra Izmailovich was fully rehabilitated only in 1989, and "not until 1990 were the 1941 charges against Spiridonova rescinded. [...] Finally, in 1992, [she] was exonerated of the charges for which she had been imprisoned and exiled beginning in 1918, and was fully rehabilitated." The exact burial place of the Medvedevsky Forest victims has never been found.

Kakhovskaya died in Maloyaroslavets in 1960 from liver cancer.

=== Family ===
Father – Konstantin Kakhovsky (? – 1890).

Mother – Augusta Fedorovna.

== Memories of Irina Kakhovskaya ==
The theorist of Socialist Revolutionary Maximalism Grigory Nestroev wrote:

"Doesn't she impress you as a saint? – a social democratic Menshevik woman I knew asked me more than once – What faith! What dedication! You know, she very often has no money to travel to the workers behind the Shlisselburg Outpost, and she walks almost 10 miles on foot from the Petersburg Side. Only the first Christians believed so, and perhaps the first Russian socialists. Now there are few of those who would walk on foot. Look at her face: pale, calm, breathing deep faith in the triumph of socialism...
And these words were true. <…> For her simplicity, for her sincerity, for her deep faith in the triumph of the workers' revolution, which was passed on to her listeners, she was treated with deep respect and appreciated as a best friend".

== Selected works ==
- Kachovskaja, Jrina (1923). Attentate auf Eichhorn und Denikin: Erinnerungen [Attempts on Eichorn's and Denikin's lives: Memories] (in German). Berlin: Verlag Skythen.
- Kachowskaja, Irène (1926). Souvenirs d'une révolutionnaire [Recollections of a revolutionary woman] (in French). Paris: Rieder.
- I. Kakhovskaya:
  - "Iz Vospominaniy o Zhenskoy Katorge" [From Reminiscences of Women's Katorga]. Katorga i Ssylka (in Russian). 1 (22): 145–162. 1926.
  - "Iz Vospominaniy o Zhenskoy Katorge (Okonchaniye)" [From Reminiscences of Women's Katorga (ending)]. Katorga i Ssylka (in Russian). 2 (23): 170–185. 1926.
- Kakhovskaya, Irina K. (April 1970). "Zapiski i Zaiavleniia" [Notes and Revelations]. Politicheskiy Dnevnik (in Russian). 67. Amsterdam: Alexander Herzen Foundation. Previously distributed as samizdat, it was later reported, in an abridged English translation entitled "Our Fate", in Cohen, Stephen Frand, ed. (1982). An End to Silence : Uncensored Opinion in the Soviet Union - from Roy Medvedev's Underground Magazine Political Diary. New York: WW Norton and Company. pp. 81-90. ISBN 0-393-01491-6.)
- Kakhovskaya, Irina (2019). Leontiev, Yaroslav (ed.). Vospominaniya terroristki [Memories of a Terrorist] (in Russian). Moscow: Radical Theory and Practice.

== Sources ==
- Boniece, Sally A. (1995). Maria Spiridonova, 1884-1918: Feminine Martyrdom and Revolutionary Mythmaking (PhD thesis). Indiana University.
- Brazier, Susan (2019). "Spiridonova, Maria (1884–1941)". Women in World History: A Biographical Encyclopedia. Encyclopedia.com.
- "Kakhovskaia, Irina". K17, 1917ko Iraultza Sozialistaren 100. urterrena uspatuz ('K17, celebrating the 100th anniversary of the Socialist Revolution of 1917') (in Basque). 2 June 2018. Archived from the original on 20 May 2022.
- Leontiev, Yaroslav Viktorovich (2010). "Zhanna d`Ark iz sibirskikh kolodnits" [Joan of Arc from the Siberian wells]. In Kozachenko S.V.; Babiy, A.A.; et al. (eds.). Kniga pamyati zhertv politicheskikh repressiy Krasnoyarskogo kraya [Book of memory of the victims of political repressions of the Krasnoyarsk Territory] (in Russian). Vol. 9 (X–Z). Krasnoyarsk: Offset Krasnoyarsk. pp. 12–30.
- Maxwell, Margaret (1990). Narodniki Women. Russian Women Who Sacrificed Themselves for the Dream of Freedom. New York: Pergamon Press.
- Rabinowitch, Alexander (July 1995). "Maria Spiridonova's 'Last Testament'". Russian Review. 54 (3): 424–446. doi:10.2307/131440. JSTOR 131440.
