= Aleksandra Izmailovich =

Belarusian socialist revolutionary (1878–1941)

- Аляксандра Ізмайловіч
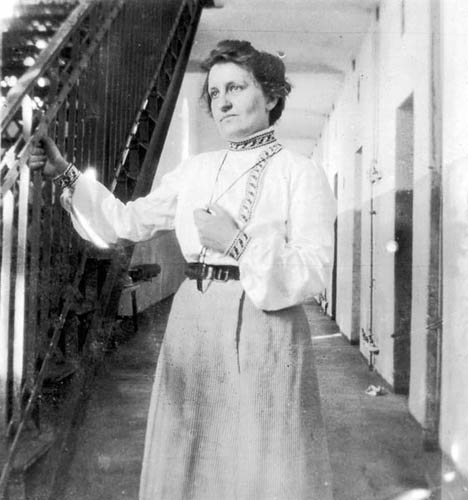
- Izmailovich in Butyrka prison, c. 1920
- Born: Aleksandra Adolfovna Izmailovich; 1878; Saint Petersburg, Russian Empire
- Died: 11 September 1941 (aged 62–63); Oryol, Soviet Union
- Political party: Socialist Revolutionary Party (1902–1917); Left Socialist-Revolutionaries (1917–1921)
- Movement: Revolutionary socialism
- Criminal charges: Conspiracy to murder
- Criminal penalty: Execution (commuted); Life in prison

Aleksandra Adolfovna Izmailovich (Belarusian: Алякса́ндра Адо́льфаўна Ізмайло́віч; 1878–1941) was a Belarusian socialist revolutionary. From a noble family, she joined the Socialist Revolutionary Party (PSR) while studying in Saint Petersburg. She used her family home in Minsk to host PSR meetings, during which they plotted attacks against Russian imperial government officials.

Izmailovich attempted to assassinate the governor of Minsk Pavel Kurlov, who was responsible for pogroms in the city, but she failed to hit him. In prison, she found out that her sister Ekaterina Izmailovich died attempting to assassinate the Russian naval commander Grigoriy Chukhnin. She was sentenced to death for the assassination attempt, but following appeals by her sisters, the sentence was commuted to a life sentence of penal labour. She was transferred to Butyrka prison in Moscow and then to Siberia, where she spent 10 years together with Maria Spiridonova and other women of the PSR.

Izmailovich spent most of the rest of her life in prison or internal exile. She was briefly freed by the Russian Revolution and became an official in the Soviet government, but she was imprisoned again by the Bolsheviks following the Left SR Uprising. Throughout the 1920s and 1930s, she was either imprisoned, kept under house arrest, or internally exiled. She was executed in the Medvedev Forest massacre after being sentenced for anti-Soviet agitation during the Great Purge.

== Early life and activism ==
Aleksandra Adolfovna Izmailovich was born in 1878, in Saint Petersburg. She was the daughter of the Belarusian military officer Adolf Izmailovich, a brigadier general who commanded the 4th Artillery Corps of the Imperial Russian Army. She had three sisters: Mariya, Evgeniya and Ekaterina Izmailovich. Aleksandra was also known by the diminutive name Sanya.

Izmailovich studied at the Saint Petersburg Imperial University, where she joined the Socialist Revolutionary Party (PSR). She had been inspired to join the socialist revolutionaries by her younger sister, Ekaterina. The two sisters were among the PSR's first members, joining the party while it was still in the process of forming in 1901.

While their father was in the Russian Far East, fighting in the Russo-Japanese War, Aleksandra and Ekaterina Izmailovich used their home in Minsk as the Belarusian headquarters of the PSR. From their house, the Socialist Revolutionary (SR) executive committee organised the party's activities, which the Izmailovich sisters carried out while disguised as servants, farmers or vendors. Following the outbreak of the Russian Revolution of 1905, the sisters became involved in PSR's terrorist activities.

== Attempted assassination of Governor Pavel Kurlov ==
After the proclamation of the October Manifesto in Minsk on 18 October 1905, a large political demonstration was held to celebrate the promise of constitutionalism in Russia. Tensions between the crowd and the gathered imperial soldiers escalated, culminating in the soldiers firing on the crowd, killing 50 and wounding 100; 1,500 more people were arrested and sentenced to penal labour in Siberia. Shortly afterwards, the Minsk branch of the PSR received orders from the party's central committee to cease all terrorist activities. The Izmailovich sisters opposed the order and convinced the Minsk branch to reject it.

Ivan Pulikhov, Izmailovich's collaborator in the attempted assassination of Pavel Kurlov

The Minsk PSR called for the prosecution of Governor Pavel Kurlov and Police Chief D. D. Norov, respectively responsible for pogroms in Minsk and the violent suppression of the 18 October demonstration. As state terrorism against the revolutionary movement increased, the PSR central committee reversed its order and gave permission for the Minsk branch to resume terrorist attacks. As their first act, Aleksandra Izmailovich and Ivan Pulikhov were tasked with assassinating Kurlov. While working on the plan, Aleksandra and Ekaterina Izmailovich made other plans to disrupt military supply lines by attacking the army's trains. Plans were put on hold after Ekaterina was arrested, with Aleksandra convincing the Minsk PSR to break her out of prison before assassinating Kurlov.

By this time, Izmailovich and Pulikhov were living together near Kurlov's house, posing as a married couple. They spent most of their time watching and following the governor. After breaking her sister out of prison and securing her safe passage into hiding, Izmailovich returned to her planned assassination. On 14 January 1906, she found out that the governor was due to attend a military funeral at the Church of Sts. Peter and Paul. Izmailovich and Pulikhov, respectively armed with a revolver and a bomb, entered the church yard as the funeral took place inside. After the ceremony, Kurlov and Norov left the church and walked towards the two SRs. Izmailovich fired her revolver at the two and Pulikhov threw the bomb at them, but the shots failed to hit their targets and the bomb failed to detonate. They were immediately attacked and arrested by the gendarmes, while their targets escaped. Norov and a retired military officer attempted to shoot Izmailovich, but both missed. The two SRs were taken to the local police station, where they were detained and tortured for information. In her memoirs, Izmailovich wrote of being beaten, stripped and spat on by "a dozen impudent police", while other officers and bailiffs watched. According to Nadezda Petrusenko, Izmailovich's biographers do not mention the violence committed against her during her detention.

== Imprisonment in Minsk ==
On the morning of 15 January, Izmailovich and Pulikhov were brought into the police station's courtyard, where they were to be identified by an assembled group of house servants. Izmailovich had been beaten so severely that one of her eyes was swollen shut and her skirt had been torn. Izmailovich was recognised by one of her father's servants and put back in her cell. Later that night, she and Pulikhov were led out of the police station and made to walk through the streets of Minsk to the city's prison. Izmailovich was given bread before being taken to her cell, where she heard the other imprisoned women singing revolutionary songs, including "La Marseillaise". Each day, while the other prisoners were allowed out of their cells to exercise in the prison yard, Izmailovich was kept in solitary confinement. She was only able to briefly exchange information with others from her cell window. Although torture by her captors continued, she was able to maintain hope due to the kindness expressed to her by her imprisoned comrades. This also caused a political dilemma for her, as she was preoccupied with the question of whether "the people" included both her captors and comrades.

One day, when Izmailovich was brought to the prison office for questioning, she was reunited with her sister Mariya. She discovered that her family had initially been told she was killed during the assassination attempt. Mariya also told her that their family home had been searched, but the police had found nothing. Izmailovich was also confronted by her former maid Tatyana, a devout Christian and a supporter of the Black Hundreds who had resisted Izmailovich's attempts to convert her to socialism. Although she was brought to tears by seeing Izmailovich's wounded face, she had been shocked to find out she had attempted to kill someone. Izmailovich's sisters visited her regularly, inquiring about her health and the status of her legal proceedings. Izmailovich herself believed she would be hanged, and repeatedly stated that she wanted to "die bravely".

In prison, Izmailovich was able to communicate with an SR comrade in the cell above her through tap code; they opened their tapped conversations with the password "God Save the Tsar". Through tap code, she found out that the bomb Pulikhov had thrown was not defective and would have killed their targets if it had detonated. She confessed that she no longer felt hatred for Kurlov, but she still felt contempt for Norov, who had refused to go to the prison and act as a witness. She believed he wanted to avoid questions about firing shots at her. On 29 January, her comrade informed her that the Black Sea Fleet commander Grigoriy Chukhnin had been wounded in an assassination attempt. She celebrated the news, as Chukhnin had been responsible for suppressing the mutiny of the Russian battleship Potemkin. However, she was soon saddened to hear that the would-be assassin had been shot and killed; the assassin, who used the name Maria Krupnitskaya, was her sister Ekaterina. In grief for her sister, she was unable to sleep that night. The next day, when the whole prison discussed the news of the attack, Izmailovich kept the identity of the attacker a secret. She read smuggled newspapers that detailed Chukhnin's recovery from his five bullet wounds inflicted by Ekaterina. When her comrade expressed his condolences, she responded that she took comfort in the idea that Ekaterina had died for a reason. She informed her sisters that Ekaterina had died attempting to kill Chukhnin, but they refused to believe her. She later received false news that Maria Spiridonova had been killed attempting to assassinate Gavriil Luzhenovsky, the governor of Tambov province, which contributed to her sadness.

== Trial ==
One morning, a prison guard told Izmailovich that she would be hanged within five days. Although she was not concerned about the death sentence, her sisters hired her a defense lawyer for her court martial. When the lawyer brought her the indictment, she was shocked to discover it named an innocent baker's assistant as the bomb thrower. Her lawyer advised her to call witnesses of the 18 October events, who could testify about the massacre of peaceful protestors ordered by Kurlov. She compiled a list, but the court refused to permit her any witnesses in her defense. After saying goodbye to her comrade in the room above her, and expressing her love for him, she prepared herself for her death. He told her not to imagine herself to be a second Sophia Perovskaya, as he believed her sentence would be commuted.

At 04:00 on 16 February, Izmailovich was woken up and brought to the prison office, where she was reunited with Polikhov and met the innocent baker's assistant. They were taken by a troop of Cossacks to the headquarters of the 4th Artillery Corps. After 5 hours waiting under armed guard, they were brought tea by Izmailovich's lawyer. They were then taken to the hall where they would be court martialled; Izmailovich saw her sister Mariya and her father waiting for her. They were tried by military officers. Kurlov himself was present, and he remained standing while the others sat. The three defendants were charged with "conspiracy with intent to kill". When the prosecution's witnesses gave testimony against them, Izmailovich's lawyer managed to induce Norov into admitting he had shot at Izmailovich while she was disarmed and under arrest.

In his opening argument, Izmailovich's lawyer pointed out that officers in that courtroom had ordered their soldiers to shoot peaceful protestors in Minsk on 18 October 1905 and asked why they had not been charged with murder. Beneath a portrait of Izmailovich's father, Kurlov responded to questioning without looking at the defendants, the attorneys or the judges. Izmailovich had thought him the victor, but when he walked past her, she saw fear in his eyes. She took comfort in having frightened such a powerful figure of the Tsarist autocracy. When Izmailovich and Pulikhov made their final statements, they focused on the killings of 18 October 1905. In his own final statement, the prosecutor requested capital punishment. After a few minutes of deliberation, the judges found Izmailovich and Pulikhov guilty of the charges of conspiracy to murder and sentenced them to execution by hanging. In her memoirs, Izmailovich reported feeling "calm and cheerful" when her death sentence was read out, as she felt happy that she would be dying for her political beliefs.

Before they could be led out of the courtroom, Izmailovich asked to give testimony in the trial of the baker's assistant. The judge agreed and she testified that he had nothing to do with the assassination, that he was not a member of their political party, and that she knew the real name of the bomb thrower. When asked for the name, she said his given name was "Samson", but that she did not know his family name. The judge disregarded her testimony and she was led out of the room. As she passed her sisters, Mariya told her that she did not believe she would be hanged. Izmailovich reported that she and Pulikhov were not afraid of death, as they believed they were dying for a good cause. At 16:00, they were taken out of the Artillery Corps headquarters and taken back to the prison by the Cossacks. On the way, Izmailovich noticed people watching her from windows, smiling and waving at her. When they arrived at the prison, Pulikhov and Izmailovich embraced for the last time. Pulikhov told Izmailovich that he was happy to die for socialism, but told her to live. He said that his last thought would be of her and her sister.

When Izmailovich was returned to her cell, she discovered that the baker's assistant had been sentenced to death, which caused her greater grief than her own sentence. Although she had been told she would be executed in short time, she passed through a week in her cell without incident. She said that, during this time, she was overwhelmed with love for life and humankind. As she thought of the possibility of the victory of the social revolution, she decided she wanted to live to see it. Eight days after the trial, she heard Pulikhov shouting to their fellow inmates that his death sentence had been upheld. The following morning, before dawn, he was hanged in the prison courtyard. As other prisoners sang revolutionary funeral songs, Izmailovich wept for her comrade, but kept in her mind his last words to her that he had been "happy to die for the cause".

After several days, the prisoners received news that the baker's assistant's sentence had been commuted to 15 years of penal labour; the authorities had faced public pressure after the publication of a letter from Izmailovich which proclaimed his innocence. Meanwhile, Izmailovich's sisters had travelled to Vilnius to appeal for a pardon. Her sentence was ultimately commuted to life imprisonment with penal labour. This left her in shock, as she had to relinquish her desire to become a martyr for her cause. She understood her sisters' actions, but nevertheless felt deprived of dying for the same cause that Pulikhov and her sister Ekaterina had died for. On 8 March 1906, she was told she would be transferred to a prison in Moscow and given a chance to say goodbye to her sisters and other comrades in the prison. She was stripped of her clothes, changed into a prison uniform and her legs were cuffed with heavy chains. Cossacks then took her to the Minsk railway station, where she was waved off by a crowd of sympathisers. On the train, she was greeted by a sympathetic guard who expressed regret that the bomb had not exploded on the day of the assassination attempt. He spoke to her for the rest of the night, discussing their mutual interest in revolutionary socialism.

== Imprisonment in Moscow ==
After completing their journey on the Moscow–Brest Railway, the Belarusian prisoners were taken by horse-drawn carriages to Butyrka prison. Izmailovich compared the prison, which had a long history of detaining subversives, to a hotel for revolutionaries. The prisoners were taken into the courtyard, to the sound of clanking chains and shouting prison guards. They were strip searched and their hair shaven, before being divided into groups and taken to their respective sections of the prison. A Finnish trusty escorted Izmailovich to the criminal women's prison, where she stayed with 20 other women in a single cramped room. She was given new clothes and tea, then asked by one of the women if she had killed her husband. One day, she was taken to the recreation room, where she met a number of other women who had attempted to assassinate government officials: Mariya Shkolnik, who had attacked Chernihiv governor Alexei Khvostov; Lydia Ezerskaya, who had assassinated interior minister Vyacheslav von Plehve; and Rebecca Fialka, who had been arrested while making bombs.

Following Shkolnik's advice, Izmailovich requested she be transferred from the criminal prison to be held together with the political prisoners. The ranks of the political prisoners continued to grow, with the prison soon becoming overcrowded. Izmailovich was visited by her sisters and other comrades from Minsk, who smuggled to her some illegal newspapers. From her cell, she could hear the sounds of Moscow city life. She was later visited by her father, who was granted a private room to speak to her. He was sad about her imprisonment and worried for Ekaterina, still not knowing that she had died attempting to assassinate Chukhnin. After he left the prison and returned to Minsk, he committed suicide. In April, Spiridonova and Anastasia Bitsenko, the respective assassins of Gavriil Luzhenovsky and Viktor Sakharov, were transferred to Butyrka. Izmailovich, who had met Bitsenko in Saint Petersburg, regularly spoke with her through the bars of her cell. From solitary confinement, Spiridonova made contact with her fellow SRs through hand-written notes.

== Transfer to Siberia ==
On 21 June 1906, Izmailovich, Spiridonova, Bitsenko, Shkolnik, Ezerskaya and Fialka were lined up for deportation to Siberia. Together they became known as The Six (Russian: Шестерка, romanized: Shesterka). Izmailovich quickly came to clash with Spiridonova, who she believed had pursued individual fame at the expense of the cause of revolutionary socialism. They were taken to the railway station and packed onto the prison car of the Trans-Siberian Railway, where they were greeted by other travellers. They were also greeted by large crowds at several stops along the way. On one occasion, Spiridonova gave a speech to a gathered crowd in Syzran, to the astonishment of Izmailovich. The other five women became suspicious of Spiridonova's speech-making, which they considered to be a demonstration of vanity and contradictory to their own revolutionary ideals. Izmailovich contrasted Spiridonova with Bitsenko, who resented her own fame, as she worried it was elevating her as an individual above the revolutionary cause. The other women attempted to get Spiridonova to stop her speeches, but she continued, even as she fell severely ill. Izmailovich wrote that Spiridonova did not understand why her speech-making made the other prisoners angry and that the hostility of her imprisoned comrades was difficult for her to process. However, as the crowds continued to gather at each stop, even growing in size, they became more sympathetic to her and joined her in making speeches to their audiences. Izmailovich herself became convinced that Spiridonova was using her personality in the service of the revolution, rather than at the expense of it. She believed Spiridonova's actions were driven by love of the people, recounting how she continued her speeches even when she was ill, and came to portray her in her memoirs as a revolutionary hero and martyr. According to Izmailovich, Spiridonova "belonged not only to the SR party. She belonged to all who carried her in their hearts as a banner of their protest."

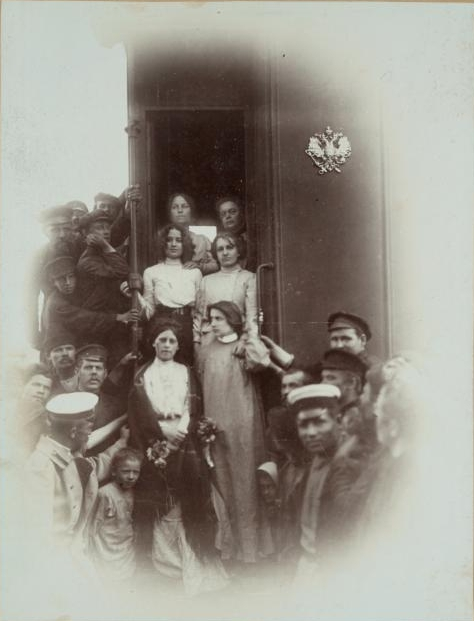
Izmailovich (middle-right) and her SR comrades arriving in Omsk in July 1906

When they arrived in Omsk, they were greeted by a crowd of 5,000 people with red flags. The crowd surrounded the car and demanded the Six be allowed to speak to them, forcing the authorities to give in. When the time came for them to leave, the crowd initially refused to let them go. Even as the women got back on the train, people climbed on the roof and tried to get them to sign autographs through the windows. The women pleaded that the crowd allow the train to proceed on its way. Once it departed, people ran alongside it, with one person throwing them flowers. During their journey, the Six spoke to thousands of people about revolutionary socialism. Izmailovich was amazed by the emotions displayed by the people when they saw the six women, as some broke down in tears or gave them anything from flowers to money and jewellery. The Siberian people were increasingly sympathetic to rebellion, as political repression in the region had been heightened by the Tsarist regime. According to Izmailovich, the people were particularly attracted to Spiridonova because she was "a woman who had declared war on tyranny and had suffered for it". The Six were even successful in distributing propaganda to the soldiers who guarded them, further spreading the ideas of democracy and revolutionary socialism. According to Izmailovich, she and Spiridonova frequently talked with their guards and even became friends with them. They also received news that a sailor had killed Chukhnin, finishing Ekaterina Izmailovich's work. Izmailovich described their journey as a "triumphal procession", in which it seemed at times that they were travelling of their own free will to hold mass meetings and review their revolutionary forces.

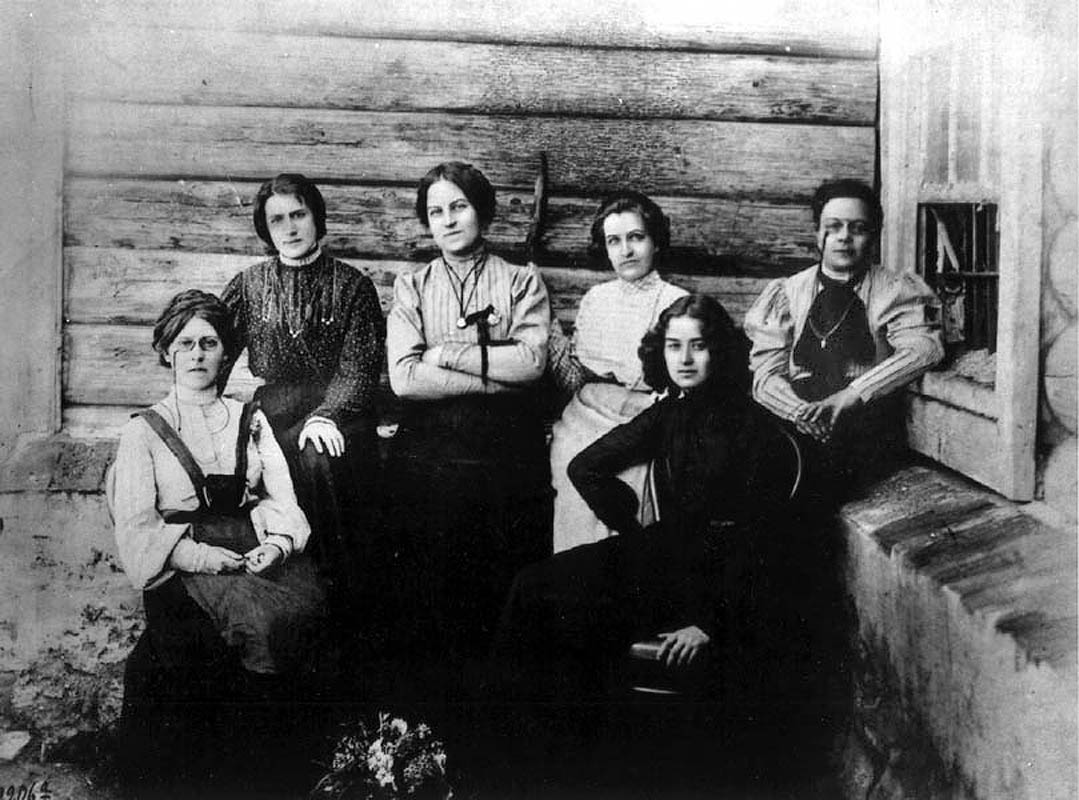
Izmailovich (third from right) during her exile in Siberia

The Six finally stopped at Sretensk, where they disembarked the train and were detained for several days. They were eventually loaded onto horse-drawn carriages and taken to the Akatuy katorga; along the way they were cheered on by locals. At the prison, they were greeted by other members of the PSR holding banners and singing revolutionary songs. Izmailovich's account of their journey ends with them receiving gifts from their fellow prisoners. This relatively lax regime ended in December 1906, when the prison administration was replaced. In February 1907, the women were transferred from Akatuy to the women's prison in Maltsev. The journey was extremely hazardous, due to the conditions of the Siberian winter. The prison was dilapidated and they struggled to keep warm through the winter. Spiridonova struggled with the conditions, which exacerbated her chronic illness, with Izmailovich caring for her in a small cell for sick prisoners. With Izmailovich's help, she was able to continue reading and writing political tracts. In 1908, Izmailovich and Spiridonova helped Irina Kakhovskaya, a convicted member of the Maximalists, get settled at the katorga. The three developed a lifelong friendship, together forming a "revolutionary family". Spiridonova referred to herself and Izmailovich as the "elder sisters" of other prisoners in the katorga, among whom they held positions of authority.

While in the Maltsev katorga, in 1908, Izmailovich wrote two long letters which were smuggled out of the prison and later formed the main primary source for information on her and her sister's revolutionary activities. In 1923 and 1924, they were published in the journal Prison and Exile; they were released under the title Iz proshlogo (From the Past) in issues 7 and 8 of the journal. Izmailovich worked hard in the fields during her time in the katorga, developing a tanned complexion from working outside in the sun; according to Kakhovskaya, she began to more closely resemble a peasant woman than her own upper-class background that she had left behind. Izmailovich wrote that during her time in Maltsev, she struggled on a daily basis to get food and books and even to maintain her dignity. Izmailovich reported that her years in Maltsev were "engraved on [her] soul". She later wrote that Spiridonova helped maintain her faith in socialism throughout their time in Maltsev, despite the hardships they went through there. The women helped provide an education to the imprisoned workers, soldiers and sailors of the katorga, with Izmailovich herself teaching literature. Izmailovich also provided child care for the children of imprisoned women; and ran a preschool and primary school, providing an education for the 100 children in the prison, but it was ultimately shut down by the authorities.

In 1910, Fialka, Ezerskaya and Shkolnik received reduced sentences and were released from Maltsev to settlements in eastern Siberia. The following year, prison authorities, seeking to reassert control over Maltsev, transferred Izmailovich, Spiridonova and Bitsenko back to Akatuy. The subsequent six years in Akatuy were considerably more difficult than the four in Maltsev, but Izmailovich wrote relatively little about it. When Spiridonova again fell ill, which left her unable to continue her forced labour, Izmailovich acted as her carer and nurse. News of the outbreak of World War I, and the support of many Russian socialists for the Allied war effort, demoralised the imprisoned women in Akatuy. Izmailovich denounced the "so-called socialists" who supported the war, declaring that they had brought about "the deepest crisis of socialism, sinking the perspectives and the path of socialism into despairing pitch darkness". As the war dragged on, the number of political prisoners in Akatuy dwindled; by 1917, Izmailovich, Spiridonova, Bitsenko and Antonina Pirogova were among only 7 political prisoners remaining, continuing to serve out their life sentences.

== Prison and exile in Soviet Russia ==
Izmailovich and her comrades were released during the February Revolution of 1917, and they immediately returned to political activism. Izmailovich initially worked as a PSR propagandist in the Chernihiv Governorate, before moving to Petrograd, where she took part in the October Revolution. During this time, she joined the Party of Left Socialist-Revolutionaries (Left SRs), which had opposed the Russian Provisional Government's continuation of Russian involvement in World War I; Izmailovich and the rest of the Six formed the core of the party's leadership. Izmailovich, Bitsenko and Spiridonova remained famous for their "triumphal procession" to Siberia in 1906.

Izamilovich unsuccessfully ran in the 1917 Russian Constituent Assembly election on the electoral list of the Left SRs in Petrograd. In November 1917, she was elected to the Left SR central committee; and in December 1917, she became a member of the All-Russian Central Executive Committee (VTsIK). On 9 December, she was appointed to the Council of People's Commissars (CPC) as commissar for public property, but she never took her post and instead continued her work in the VTsIK. From this position, she expressed sympathy for the situation of the Turkestan Autonomy, which had fallen to Soviet influence; she and her fellow Left SRs would be the only supporters of Turkestan Autonomy in the Soviet government. From April to May 1918, she headed the Organisational and Propaganda Department of the VTsIK. By the Fifth All-Russian Congress of Soviets in June 1918, the Left SRs had been forced out of the government by the Bolsheviks; Izmailovich quipped that "the Left SRs failed to consider the Bolsheviks' capacity to work miracles". The Left SRs, including Izmailovich, subsequently turned against the Bolsheviks.

Izmailovich was free for only 16 months before being arrested again by the new post-revolutionary authorities. After the Left SR uprising on 6 July 1918, Izmailovich and Spiridonova were arrested and imprisoned in the Kremlin; Izmailovich herself had not participated in the uprising. She wrote that the conditions of the former Tsarist prisons remained largely the same under the Soviet Republic, except that they had become dirtier. Upon her release, she became openly critical of the Bolshevik government, leading to further arrests. Izmailovich was arrested again in Minsk in January 1919, but released shortly afterwards. She was later held in Butyrka prison from October 1919 to September 1921. She and Spiridonova were then either imprisoned or kept under house arrest or internally exiled for the rest of their lives. Spiridonova wrote to Izmailovich that she believed their treatment in the Bolshevik prisons was intended to slowly kill them.

Under constant police surveillance, Izmailovich cared for Spiridonova at a trade union's dacha in Malakhovka, until she was rearrested in 1923 and exiled to Kaluga. In 1925, Izmailovich and Spiridonova were then exiled to Samarkand, where they reunited with Irina Kakhovskaya. There they worked menial jobs until 1928, when they were transferred to Tashkent. As the health of Izmailovich and Spiridonova declined due to typhoid fever, they were taken to a sanatorium in Yalta. Their accommodation, treatment and their medication was not paid for by the authorities, so they were sent money by friends living abroad. Izmailovich soon went back to Tashkent, while Spiridonova stayed in Yalta until August 1930. Izmailovich, Kakhovskaya and Spiridonova were then transferred to political exile in Ufa, where they were kept under house arrest and subjected to constant surveillance. Over the course of the 1930s, Izmailovich progressively rejected politics, refusing to read any newspapers. As her health deteriorated, she was no longer able to continue with her office job and took over housekeeping for her comrades that were still working. She spent most of her time writing, completing a book on art and literature by 1937. In Ufa she shared a flat with Kakhovskaya and Spiridonova, as well as the latter's husband, Ilya Mayorov and their family.

In February 1937, as their sentences of exile were due to end, the whole household was arrested by the NKVD during the first days of the Great Purge. They were detained for several months under the charge of having attempted to create a united counterrevolutionary centre and having carried out terrorist acts against the Communist leaders of Bashkiria. According to Kakhovskaya, Izmailovich defied the interrogations by the NKVD, despite her own weakening health. She believed that the Great Purge had exposed the "monstrous lie" of the Soviet revolution. On 25 December 1937, in a closed session of the Military Collegium of the Supreme Court of the Soviet Union on the fabricated case of the All–Union Socialist Revolutionary Center, Izmailovich was sentenced to 10 years in prison; Kakhovskaya was also sentenced to 10 years and Spiridonova to 25. All three refused either to confess anything or to accuse anybody. The Left SR prisoners, except Kakovskaya, were eventually transferred to a prison isolation ward in Oryol.

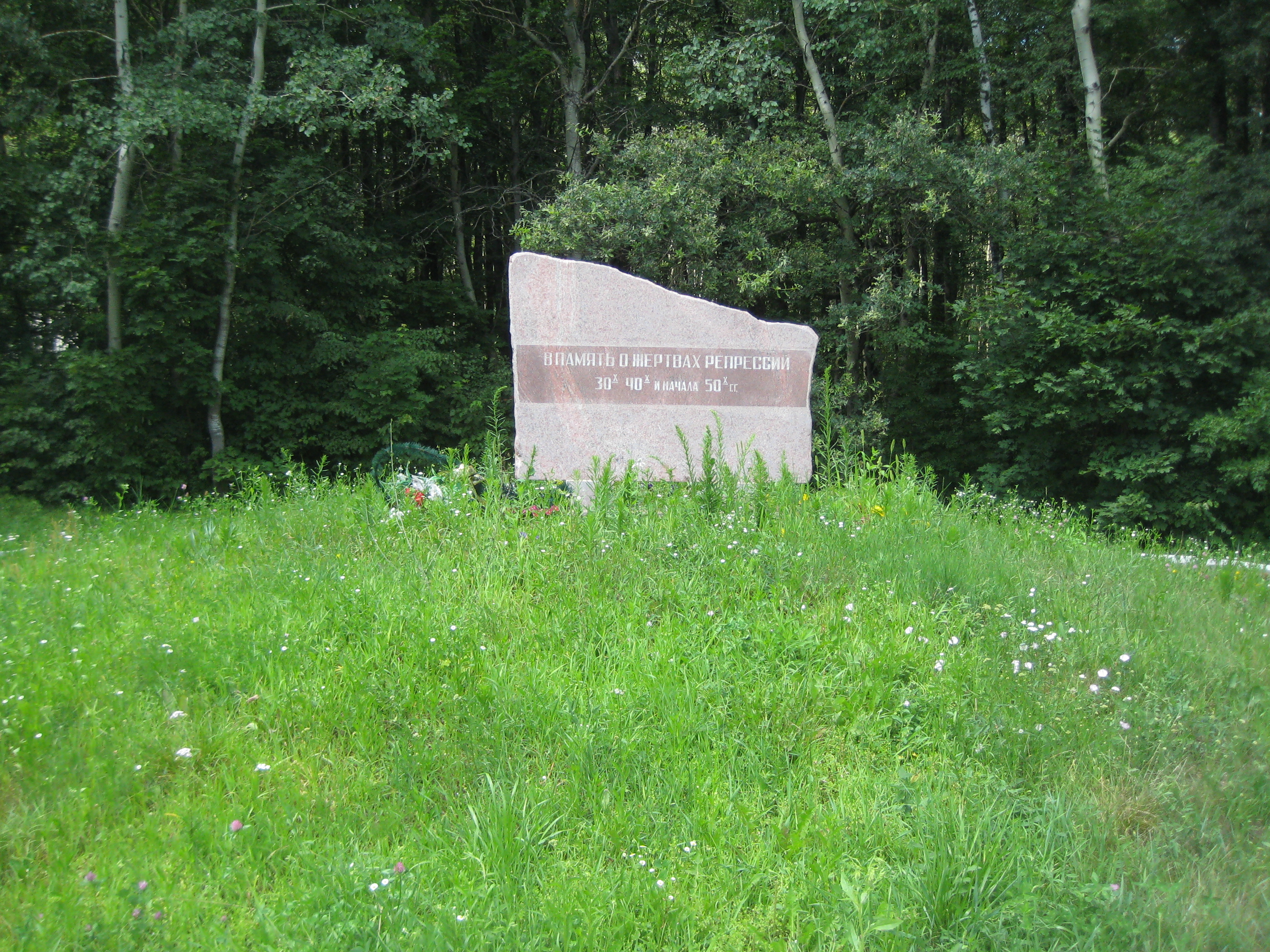
Memorial to victims of the Medvedev Forest massacre

On 11 September 1941, as invading Nazi troops approached Oryol, Izmailovich, Spiridonova, Mayorov and 154 other political prisoners were removed from their cells. They were gagged, preventing them commenting on the proceedings, and sentenced to death under personal orders from Stalin. The prisoners were then driven into the nearby Medvedevsky forest, where they were shot and buried in a secluded area, the location of which has never been determined. In 1957, Izmailovich was rehabilitated for her rehabilitated during the Great Purge as part of De-Stalinization. In 1989, she was also rehabilitated for the sentences against her during the 1920s and early 1930s. Writer Semion Lyandres listed Izmailovich alongside Spiridonova, Fruma Frumkina and Dora Brilliant, whom he considered the most prominent female terrorists of the 1905 Revolution.

== Bibliography ==
- Boniece, Sally A. (2003). "The Spiridonova Case, 1906: Terror, Myth, and Martyrdom". Kritika: Explorations in Russian and Eurasian History. 4 (3): 571–606. doi:10.1353/kri.2003.0034. ISSN 1538-5000. OCLC 4638340698.
- Boniece, Sally A. (2024). "The Martyrdom of Illness: Mariia Spiridonova in Siberian Imprisonment, 1906–17". The Slavonic and East European Review. 102 (1): 98–125. doi:10.1353/see.00005. ISSN 0037-6795. OCLC 10270371869.
- Douds, Lara (2017). "'The dictatorship of the democracy'? The Council of People's Commissars as Bolshevik-Left Socialist Revolutionary coalition government, December 1917 – March 1918". Historical Research. 90 (247): 32–56. doi:10.1111/1468-2281.12170. ISSN 1468-2281. OCLC 6922828552.
- Leoniev, Ya. V. (1993). "Измайлович Александра Адольфовна" [Izmailovich Aleksandra Adolfovna]. Политические деятели России 1917 (in Russian). Great Russian Encyclopedia. ISBN 9785852701374. OCLC 29600430.
- Lyandres, Semion (1989). "The 1918 Attempt on the Life of Lenin: A New Look at the Evidence". Slavic Review. 48 (3): 432–448. doi:10.2307/2498997. ISSN 0037-6779. JSTOR 2498997.
- Maxwell, Margaret (1990). Narodniki Women: Russian Women Who Sacrificed Themselves for the Dream of Freedom. Pergamon Press. ISBN 0080374611. OCLC 20393384.
- Morozov, Konstantin (2024). "Subculture of the Russian Revolutionary as a Factor of 'Revolutionary Biography' Formation" (PDF). Revolutionary Biographies in the 19th and 20th Centuries: Imperial–Inter/national–Decolonial. Brill. pp. 117–148. ISBN 9783847112488. OCLC 1433290314.
- Petrusenko, Nadezda (2017). Creating the Revolutionary Heroines: The case of Female Terrorists of the PSR (Russia, Beginning of the 20th Century) (PDF) (PhD thesis). Stockholm University. ISBN 978-91-7797-082-8.
- Rabinowitch, Alexander (1995). "Maria Spiridonova's 'Last Testament'". The Russian Review. 54 (3): 424–446. doi:10.2307/131440. ISSN 0036-0341. JSTOR 131440.
- Yaroshevski, Dov B. (1987). "Russian Regionalism in Turkestan". The Slavonic and East European Review. 65 (1): 77–100. ISSN 0037-6795. JSTOR 4209432.
