= Vladimir electoral district =

Constituency of the Russian Republic

Vladimir
- Former Civilian constituency for the All-Russian Constituent Assembly
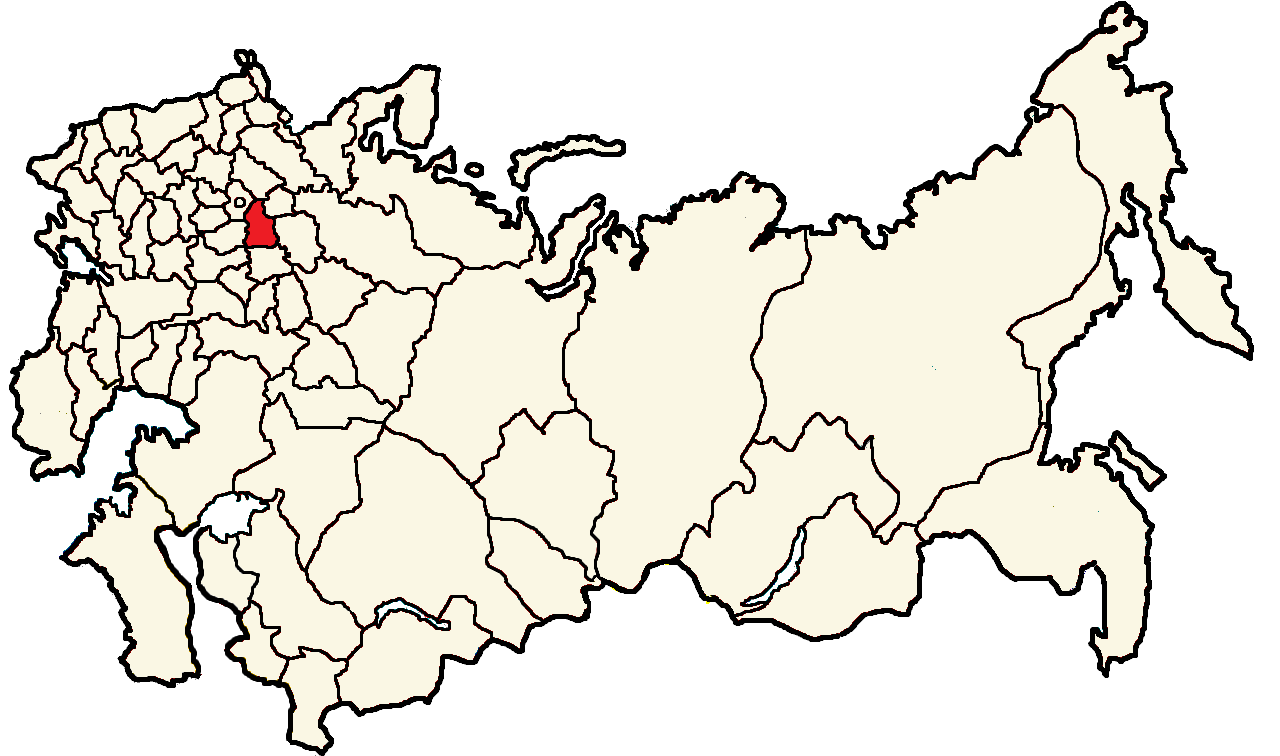

Former constituency
- Created: 1917
- Abolished: 1918
- Number of members: 9
- Number of Uyezd Electoral Commissions: 13
- Number of Urban Electoral Commissions: 2
- Number of Parishes: 213

The Vladimir electoral district (Russian: Владимирский избирательный округ) was a constituency created for the 1917 Russian Constituent Assembly election. The electoral district covered the Vladimir Governorate. Vladimir was heavily industrialized, second only to Moscow itself. There were many textile mills in Ivanovo-Voznesensky. Out of 11 lists submitted, 7 were approved whilst 4 non-partisan peasants' lists were denied registration.

== Results ==
Vladimir
Party	Vote	%	Seats
List 6 - Bolsheviks	337,941	55.95	6
List 3 - Socialist-Revolutionaries and Congress of Peasants Deputies	197,311	32.67	3
List 1 - Kadets	38,035	6.30	
List 4 - Mensheviks	13,074	2.16	
List 2 - Revival of Free Russia (rightists)	9,209	1.52	
List 5 - Popular Socialists	6,908	1.14	
List 7 - Cooperative	1,482	0.25	
Total:	603,960		9

Deputies Elected
Makeev	SR
Sokolov	SR
Spiridonova	SR
Frunze	Bolshevik
Kiselyov	Bolshevik
Lomov-Oppokov	Bolshevik
Lyubimov	Bolshevik
Naumov	Bolshevik
Zhidelev	Bolshevik

Out of 13 uezds, SR won in 2; Viazniki (east of industrial belt), an area with hemp and linen production where SRs scored 42.4%, and further east in Gorokhovets uezd, an area with no factories where SRs scored 57.4%. In Vladimir town, the Kadets got 4,457 votes (34%), the Bolsheviks 4,041 votes (30.8%), the SRs 2,610 votes (19.9%), the Mensheviks 1,230 votes (9.4%), the Popular Socialists 474 votes (3.6%), the right-wing "Revival" list 265 votes (2%) and the Cooperative list 37 votes (0.3%). In the Vladimir garrison, the Bolsheviks obtained 2,801 votes (79.1%), the SRs 438 votes (12.4%), the Kadets 175 votes (5%), the Mensheviks 78 votes (2.2%) and the remaining 49 votes were divided between the Popular Socialist and Cooperative lists.

In Ivanovo-Voznesensk town the Bolsheviks got 17,166 votes (64.3%), the Kadets 4,174 votes (15.6%), the SRs 3,389 votes (12.7%), Revival 808 votes (3%), the Mensheviks 679 votes (2.5%), the Popular Socialists 420 votes (1.6%) and the Cooperative list 60 votes (0.2%). In the town garrison the Bolsheviks obtained 1,352 votes (74.5%), the SRs 307 votes (17%), the Kadets 106 votes (5.3%), the Mensheviks 28 votes (1.5%) and 19 votes for the remaining lists.
