= Left Socialist-Revolutionaries =

Revolutionary political party in Russia from 1917 to 1921

Party of Left Socialist-Revolutionaries-Internationalists Партия левых социалистов-революционеров-интернационалистов
- Leader: Boris Kamkov; Mark Natanson; Maria Spiridonova
- Founded: November/December 1917
- Dissolved: May 1921
- Split from: Socialist Revolutionary Party
- Ideology: Narodism; Agrarian socialism Revolutionary socialism Socialist internationalism Homogeneous socialist government Factions: Scythianism
- Political position: Far-left

The Party of Left Socialist-Revolutionaries-Internationalists (Russian: Партия левых социалистов-революционеров-интернационалистов, romanized: Partiya levykh sotsialistov-revolyutsionerov-internatsionalistov) was a revolutionary socialist political party formed during the Russian Revolution.

In 1917, the Socialist Revolutionary Party split between those who supported the Russian Provisional Government, established after the February Revolution and those who supported the Bolsheviks, who favoured the overthrow of the Provisional Government and the placing of political power in the hands of the Congress of Soviets. Those that continued to support the Provisional Government became known as the Right SRs while those who aligned with the Bolsheviks became known as the Left Socialist-Revolutionaries or Left SRs (Russian: левые эсеры, romanized: leviye esery). After the October Revolution, the Left SRs formed a coalition government with the Bolsheviks from November 1917 to March 1918, but resigned its position in government after the signing of the Treaty of Brest-Litovsk. The Central Committee of the Left SRs ultimately ordered the assassination of Wilhelm von Mirbach in an attempt to cause Russia to re-enter World War I and launched an ill-fated uprising against the Bolsheviks shortly after. Most members of the Left SRs were promptly arrested, though the majority that opposed the uprising were steadily released and allowed to retain their positions in the Soviets and bureaucracy. However, they were unable to reorganize the party, which gradually splintered into multiple pro-Bolshevik parties – all of which would merge with the Russian Communist Party (Bolsheviks) by 1921.

The Left SRs were overwhelmingly underrepresented in the Russian Constituent Assembly due to outdated candidate lists which did not acknowledge the split between the Right and Left SRs.

== History ==
=== Background ===
The left-wing faction of the Socialist Revolutionary Party began to form after the February Revolution, grouping the most radical elements of the party. The internal faction was highlighted in the First All-Russian Congress of Soviets of Workers' and Soldiers' Deputies in mid-May 1917 for its position close to that of the Bolsheviks, while the bulk of the party aligned with the Mensheviks. The left-wing socialist revolutionaries were especially strong in the Petrograd Soviet, where they opposed the continuation of the First World War – which had been defended by the centrist fraction of the party since mid-April. They were also strong in the Northern Region, Kazan, Kronstadt, Helsinki and Kharkiv.

Later they became the main current in important rural provinces of the Russian interior, places where the socialist revolutionaries enjoyed the favor of the population. At the third party congress in May, they were a large and important fraction, although it was not until the crisis of autumn and the October Revolution when its support extended to the entire country. During the summer of 1917, it was gaining strength among soldier committees, both inside the country and in the front.

Except for Mark Natanson, at the head of the faction was a series of young leaders, from exile (Boris Kamkov), from Siberia (Maria Spiridonova) or agitation activities among the population (Prosh Proshian). The SR leadership, on the contrary, had veteran and conservative representatives, who led the party into an alliance with the liberals. This led the party to share government power but, at the same time, jeopardized its support among the population. As the year progressed, the leadership of the SRs moved further and further away from the feelings of its followers and its base, which favoured the leftist current. The number of socialist-revolutionary organizations and committees that followed the leftist faction grew, a trend that was accentuated in the early autumn. In general, workers and soldiers agreed with the positions of the left-wing, the intelligentsia continued to support the SR party line, and the peasants and local branches were divided among them. The executive committee of the largest railway union, the Vikzhel, elected on 23 August, had a majority of Left SRs. During the congresses of the regional, national and provincial soviets held between August and November, it was the effective division of the Right SRs and the strength of those on the left that often allowed the approval of leftist motions.

The leftists declared themselves the only representatives of the party program, and proclaimed the socialist character of the revolution, demanded the end of collaboration with the bourgeoisie and the immediate socialization of land, first with their surrender to the land committees and then to the peasants themselves. They were also opposed to the continuation of the war, even if it involved signing a separate peace with the Central Powers. In industrial policy, they advocated the granting of various rights (union organizing, living wages, eight-hour days) and workers' control of factories and played a prevalent role in the factory committees. Internationalists in the party wanted the extension of the revolution to other countries. They also advocated the transfer of government power to the Soviets, convinced that the provisional government did not apply the reforms they deemed necessary.

After the failed Kornilov coup, the leftist current took control of the socialist-revolutionary organization in the capital, traditionally more radical than that of other localities. Their growth within the SRs led them to hope that it would come under their control, delaying a split.

In October 1917, the Left Socialist Revolutionaries joined the new Petrograd Military Revolutionary Committee, formed with the aim of accelerating the revolution and at the same time moderating actions of the Bolsheviks; One of its members, Pavel Lazimir, who had played a leading role in the measures against Kornilov and presided over the military section of the Petrograd Soviet, presided over it officially. Numerous left-wing social revolutionaries, in addition to Bolsheviks and other activists without clear affiliation, participated in the committee's activities, from which the former withdrew on several occasions in protest of the actions of the Bolsheviks. Despite opposition from its main leaders, many Left SRs eventually participated in actions against the discredited Provisional Government before the Second All-Russian Congress of Soviets of Workers' and Soldiers' Deputies, in which they called for the transfer of government power to the Soviets. The moderate Bolshevik current, headed by Lev Kamenev and Grigory Zinoviev, counted on the collaboration of the Left SRs to form a majority in the constituent assembly.

=== Split with the Socialist Revolutionary Party ===
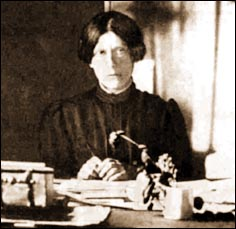
Maria Spiridonova, revolutionary icon and symbol of the new Left SR party.

The final Left SR split was due to the party's attitude towards the Second All-Russian Congress of Soviets of Workers' and Soldiers' Deputies. At the beginning, the SRs opposed the convocation of the new congress, fearing that it would be dominated by the extremists. After seeing that it had the support of much of the populace, the party changed its stance to support the congress, but only stood for delegate elections where it believed it had a chance of being elected, having lost much of the old support in big cities and the front line. In these councils, the majority of the elected delegates were Bolsheviks or Left SRs. At least half of the Socialist Revolutionary delegates elected to Congress belonged to the leftist current of the party. Together, the SR delegations held a slight majority in the congress.

The representatives of the Left SRs hoped that the Petrograd Soviet would not take power by itself, but that the Congress of the Soviets would form a new socialist government that included multiple parties and separated Alexander Kerenski from power without causing a civil war. Despite its presence in the Military Revolutionary Committee, the Left SRs opposed an armed insurrection.

During the Congress, in the midst of October Revolution, the Central Committee of the Socialist Revolutionary Party ordered its members to leave the Military Revolutionary Committee, the center of the "Bolshevik adventure", having previously ordered the withdrawal of delegates from Congress. Part of the party's left wing remained in Congress and refused to leave the Military Committee. They were expelled by the SR Central Committee the next day, along with all those considered complicit in the Bolshevik uprising. The remaining delegates voted in favor of the decrees on peace and land – the latter very similar to the SR program -, but they refused to accept an exclusively Bolshevik government and demanded the formation of a coalition including both socialists in favor of the October Revolution and those who rejected it. They refused to join the Sovnarkom, although they did accept twenty-nine seats (compared to the sixty-seven of the Bolsheviks and twenty of other minor groups) in the new All-Russian Central Executive Committee that emerged from the congress. Remaining outside the new government they were convinced that they could favor the creation of a coalition between socialists.

During the rebellion, the Left SRs had maintained a similar position to that of the Bolsheviks, participating in agitation in favor of the dissolution of the Russian Provisional Government, the transfer of power to the soviets and chairing the Petrograd Military Revolutionary Committee. Opposed to the Bolshevik seizure of power up until the last moment, they reluctantly supported it, worried about the possibility of the Provisional Government's return or the unleashing of a counterrevolution. Their votes, together with those of the Bolsheviks, had been crucial in approving the overthrow of the Provisional Government and the seizure of power in Congress The Left Socialist Revolutionaries entered the Council of People's Commissars, leading the people's commissariats of agriculture (Kolegaev), property (Karelin), justice (Steinberg), post offices and telegraphs (Proshian), local government (Trutovsky), and Algasov received the post of People's Commissar without portfolio. The left SRs also collaborated with the Bolsheviks during Kerensky's attempts to regain control of the capital, in which they played a leading role in the street-fighting. Many representatives of the Left Socialist Revolutionary Party participated in the creation of the Red Army, in the work of the All-Russian Extraordinary Commission.

Subsequently, the SR Central Committee began to dissolve local groups that they considered to be rebels, beginning with the largest in the country, that of the capital, with around forty-five thousand members. Although the true extent of the split unleashed by the PSR Central Committee is unknown, it is considered to have been remarkable and deprived the Socialist Revolutionaries of most of its radical elements and most of its support among the soldiers, while the intelligentsia remained mainly in the old party and the peasantry was divided between the two formations. In geographical terms, the new party formed by those expelled from the Socialist Revolutionary Party gained control of nearly half a dozen provinces, mainly in Ukraine and the Urals, parts of the capital and other isolated rural areas in the country. Their first conference as a separate group, held in November 1917, brought together representatives of ninety-nine groups.

==== Demands ====
The Left SRs made the following demands:

- Condemnation of the war as an imperialist venture and immediately exit from the same war.
- Cessation of cooperation with the provisional government of the Socialist Revolutionary Party.
- Immediate resolution of the land issue in accordance with the program of the party and giving of the land to the peasantry.

=== Organization and first months ===
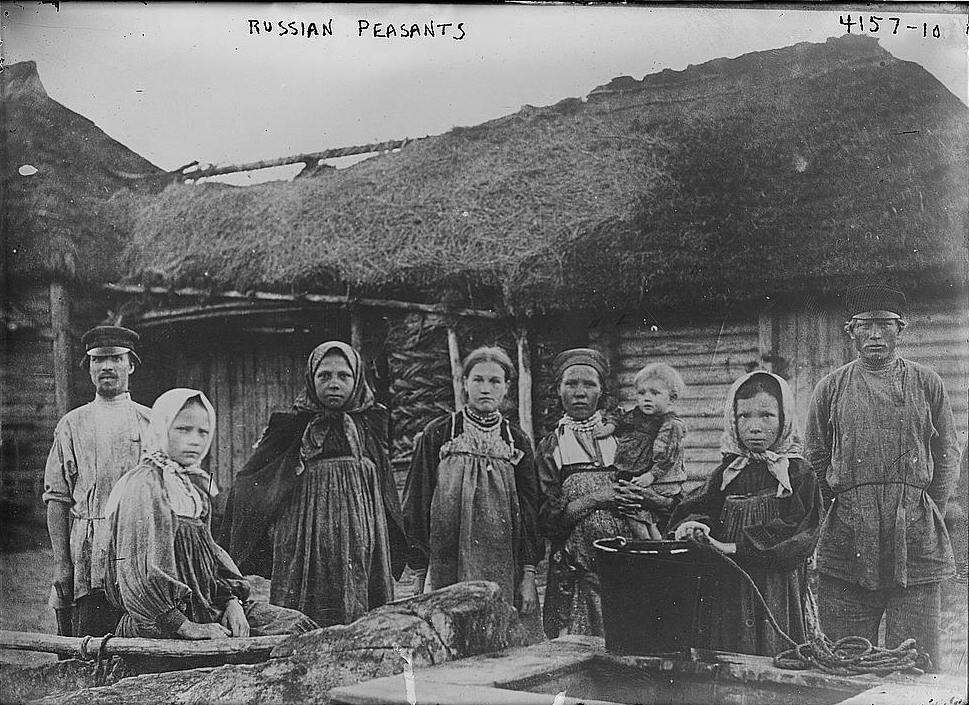
Russian peasants. The Left SRs presented itself as their main representative and sole defender of the populist program against the passivity of the moderate Socialist Revolutionary Party. The reforms they led during the first months of 1918 gave the government significant support in the countryside.

The new party held its first congress in early December and elected a central committee of fifteen members and five deputies. The conference was attended by one hundred and sixteen delegates from ninety-nine local organizations that had abandoned Socialist Revolutionary Party. The leadership was dominated by the more moderate current of the party.

At first the Left SRs defended the creation of a new exclusively socialist government that included all currents and parties, including the Right SRs. However, the refusal of the Right SRs to participate and the pressure of its most extreme supporters made the party abandon this cause and agree to negotiate with the Bolsheviks its entry into the revolutionary government, even if the rest of the socialist formations did not enter it. For the Bolsheviks, the coalition with the left social revolutionaries represented a way of obtaining some peasant support.

==== Approach to the Bolsheviks ====
While the Socialist Revolutionary Party expelled the leftists, its various currents had participated in the failed negotiations to form a socialist coalition government, imposed by the executive committee of the main railway union (the Vikzhel). The idea of a broad socialist coalition government had received widespread support, including among the Bolsheviks, during the Soviet Congress, in which a motion to this effect by Julius Martov had initially been unanimously approved. The Bolshevik radicals – led by Lenin and Trotsky – and the conservative faction of the Socialist Revolutionaries had been opposed to an agreement between the new government and the socialist opposition. The Left Socialist Revolutionaries, together with the moderate Bolsheviks and the Menshevik left, had played a crucial role in the negotiations thanks to their prominent presence in the Vikzhel that had imposed them. Their initial refusal to join the Government with the Bolsheviks was due to their desire to assume the role of mediator between the Bolsheviks and the socialists opposed to the October Revolution. After the failure of the coalition negotiations and the approval of the censorship of press in the CEC, the socialist revolutionaries resigned from the CMR, although they remained there.

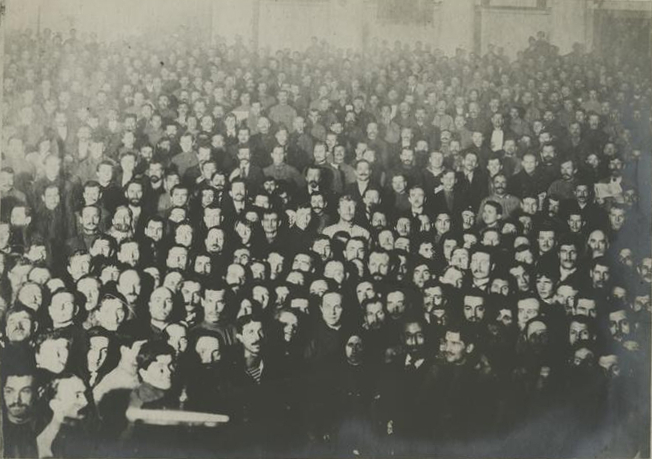
Spiridonova, surrounded by delegates of the Second Congress of Peasant Soviets, at the end of 1917.

For its part, continuing the talks to join the new government, the Left SRs demanded the union of the executive committee of the Soviets of Workers and Soldiers with that of the Soviets of Peasants, of which it hoped to gain control in the imminent second congress, in addition to limit the Sovnarkom to executive functions and leave the legislative to a new unified Executive Committee. Lenin, in need of the support of the peasantry, agreed to these conditions. The result, however, was not as satisfactory as the Left SRs announced, since the government was controlled by the All-Russian Central Executive Committee. However, the alliance of Bolsheviks and left-wing socialist revolutionaries gave them control of the splintered Second Congress of Peasant Soviets. This had been called by mutual agreement between the Bolsheviks and left-wing socialist revolutionaries, to eliminate the Right SR leadership that still dominated the executive committee of the peasant soviets and that rejected the October Revolution.

During their conversations with the Bolsheviks that ended their entry into the Government, they demanded control of the Ministry of Justice because of their opposition to terror, with the intention of stopping it, and they obtained this portfolio for Isaac Steinberg. The objective of the Left SRs in partnering with the Bolsheviks was to moderate their actions, as well as participate in the revolutionary process that was coming.

The Left SRs formed a coalition with the Bolsheviks in the Council of People's Commissars in late 1917 when, after Lenin's ultimatum to moderate Bolshevik leaders to abandon their attempts to achieve a coalition government with the rest of the more moderate socialist parties, those left the Government (among them, Lev Kamenev, Grigory Zinoviev, Aleksei Rykov and Viktor Nogin).

=== Government coalition ===
==== Formation of the coalition ====
Eight members of the Left SRs eventually entered the Sovnarkom. Others also joined the Cheka —after the forced dissolution of the constituent assembly—, whose actions managed to moderate in some cases. The government agreement was reached on 28, the day on which the executive councils of the two council organizations were unified. Three days later, the Agriculture Ministry passed into the hands of the left-wing socialist revolutionary Andrei Kolegayev and Left SR deputy commissioners were appointed in other government posts. Finally and after new and hard negotiations, the Left SRs obtained the Justice Ministry for Isaac Steinberg (25). For his part, Karelin obtained the Deputy Commissariat of State Property, Prosh Proshian that of Post and Telegraph, Trutovski that of Local Government and Aleksandra Izmailovich that of Housing. The Bolsheviks, however, maintained the most powerful ministries, those that controlled the armed forces, finances, and politics Despite having seven commissioners and vice-commissioners compared to the eleven Bolsheviks, the distribution of power in the government was very unfavorable to the Left SRs.

According to Leonard Shapiro, the alliance between Bolsheviks and left socialist revolutionaries "was to prove a shortlived and uneasy coalition, but it pacified Vikzhel, gave the Bolsheviks the appearance of peasant support, and no doubt also served to allay dormant apprehensions among the recent dissidents within the bolshevik party". The alliance lasted until mid-March 1918, when the left socialist revolutionaries withdrew from the government in protest at the signing of the Brest-Litovsk Treaty.

==== Attitude towards the Constituent Assembly and the Third Congress of Soviets ====
Despite initially defending the convocation of the Russian Constituent Assembly, the number of its delegates to it was low.

Partly their low presence on the Socialist Revolutionary lists was due to the youth and lack of experience of many of its future members, which made them seem unsuitable candidates to represent the party. The Left SRs wanted to approve extensive political and social changes in the assembly, but had no intention of submitting to parliamentary procedures to achieve its revolutionary objectives, as was the case with the Bolsheviks. Even the most moderate of the Left SR leaders were only willing to tolerate the existence of the Assembly as long as they did not oppose the new system of government that emerged from the October Revolution. From the party's point of view, the Assembly should limit itself to little more than endorsing the workers and peasants government created in the revolution and in no case would it be allowed to oppose the government of the Soviets, being threatened with dissolution if this happened.

Their candidate to preside over the Assembly, Maria Spiridonova, also supported by the Bolsheviks, was defeated by the SR leader, Victor Chernov by 244 votes to 153. Following the Assembly's rejection of the government motion (the "Declaration of the Rights of Working and Exploited Peoples"), that included the legislation approved until then by the Sovnarkom and limited its activity to establishing the bases for a socialist transformation, the Bolshevik and Left SR deputies left the session. Despite the last-minute doubts of the Left SR commissioners, the Assembly was dissolved the next day (19). Both the party's bases and its delegates to the Third Congress of Soviets, generally approved the action. For the Left SRs, the Assembly had lost its original function because the measures expected of it had already been enacted by the Sovnarkom.

In this Third Congress of Soviets, which brought together soldiers and workers with peasants for the first time, the Left SRs supported the Bolshevik position against that of the Right SRs and managed to defeat the rightist's motions to debate land management. But the leftists became increasingly dependent on Lenin's party and lost their political power base by approving the union of the soviets, as the peasant section was now subordinated to that of the workers and soldiers, controlled by the Bolsheviks. In exchange for accepting the union of the congresses, the left socialist revolutionaries had achieved the Bolshevik acceptance of the socialization of land (instead of the expropriation that the Bolsheviks proposed and would later carry out), which the new Unified Congress approved by 376 votes out of 533.

=== Agrarian policy and the strengthening of the Soviet regime ===
In the field, the Left SRs played a crucial role in extending the authority of the new Soviet Government through the "volost" soviets that the Bolsheviks, weak in the countryside, could not play. Also, the party supervised the agrarian reform approved by the Government at the end of 1917 and maintained control of both the Commissary of Agriculture and the peasant section of the VTsIK – chaired by Spiridonova -, also in charge of agrarian issues. The legal reforms that supported the changes in the countryside increased support for the Soviet regime in Russian agriculture and during their months in government the Left SRs managed to unite their populist program with the peasant desires for land. These measures concentrated the efforts of the party once disputes by the Constituent Assembly, dissolved by the Government, had ended. The populists also supported the resurgence of communes, despite the Bolshevik opposition. The new "Fundamental Law of Land Socialization" —which abolished private land ownership, handed it over to those who worked it and favored cooperatives—, enacted on 9, it was also populist-inspired (see Decree on Land). Lenin accepted it as inevitable. Between the approval in the Congress of Soviets and the ratification by the VTsIK, which emerged from the Congress, the Bolsheviks managed to include important clauses such as the priority of collective farms or the state concession of property that upset the Left SRs. The law produced a gigantic change in land ownership in the spring of 1918, generally carried out in a peaceful and orderly manner. Although the result did not dramatically increase the amount of land per farmer, it fulfilled the old peasant desire to drive out landowners and redistribute their land. In early 1918, The main strength of the Bolshevik-controlled regime was due to the peasant support achieved by its socialist-revolutionary allies, while in the cities the opposition of the middle classes continued and workers' disillusionment arose due to the food crisis.

=== Split with the Bolsheviks ===
==== Terror ====
Along with differences over land ownership, the main dissent between the two allied parties was due to the use of terror as a political instrument. Steinberg, as People's Commissar of Justice, was in favor of applying harsh measures against the opposition, but always legally; Lenin, on the contrary, was willing to use state terror to consolidate the revolution. Contrary to the activity of the Cheka, founded five days before the entry of Steinberg into the government, the Left SRs eventually decided to participate in the body – to try to control it. Steinberg tried to subordinate it to the revolutionary court, which dealt with the cases related to counterrevolutionary activity. But efforts to control Cheka's activity failed, as Lenin gave the organization the power to inform the Commissioners of its actions once already carried out, without the need for prior permission. In practice, the Cheka was subordinate only to the Sovnarkom, where the Bolshevik majority could approve its actions without the Left SRs being able to impede it.

After the dissolution of the Constituent Assembly, the Bolshevik Party finally agreed to admit the left socialist revolutionaries into the Cheka. Four of them joined the body's advisory board, a number that grew over time to almost equal that of the Bolsheviks.

The socialist revolutionary Peter Aleksandrovich, lieutenant of Felix Dzerzhinski, obtained great power in the Cheka, imposing unanimous votes in the troikas' that judged the most serious cases of counterrevolutionary activity, which in practice gave the veto over the death sentences. Until the loss of control of the body during the July revolt, the Left SRs avoided the execution of political prisoners. Even after his brethren joined the organization, Steinberg continued to try to subordinate the Cheka to his Commissariat, and reported their abuses.

==== Peace with the Central Powers ====
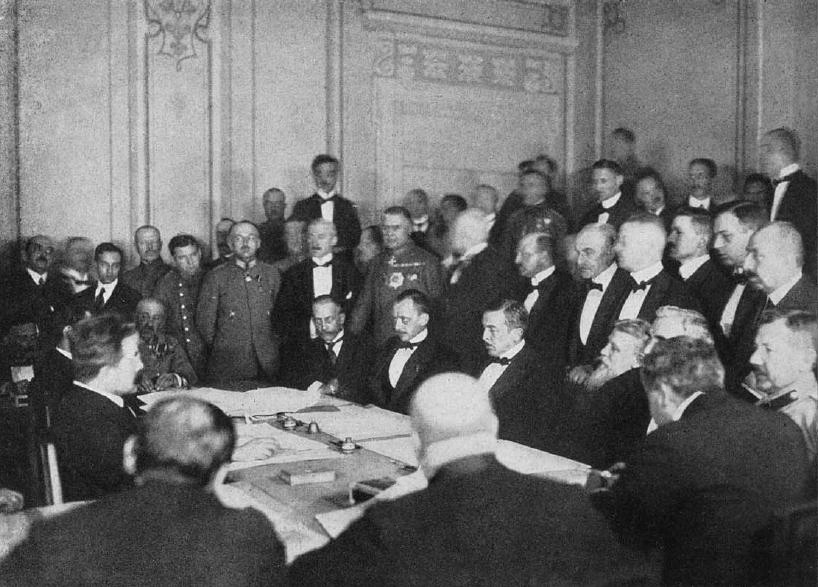
Negotiations with Central Empires in Brest-Litovsk. The Left SRs opposed the conditions imposed by the imperialist powers, rejecting the peace treaty and withdrawing from the coalition government with the Bolsheviks.

The main disagreement with the Bolsheviks arose during the peace negotiations with the Central Powers that ended in the Treaty of Brest-Litovsk. At a meeting of the All-Russian Central Executive Committee on February 23, the Left Socialist Revolutionaries criticized the Bolsheviks for their repressions on trade union freedoms and voted against the signing of the treaty. None of the ninety-three party representatives in the VTsIK voted in favor of the treaty, albeit in some cases, such as that of Spiridonova, only for party discipline. This disagreement led to the resignation of the Socialist Revolutionary Commissioners on March 19, 1918, during the Fourth Congress of Soviets. The Socialist Revolutionaries rejected the treaty, but their departure from the government did not mean a complete break with the Bolsheviks as both parties continued to collaborate in other councils and in the Commissariats. The socialist revolutionary leadership was actually very divided: almost half of the central committee was inclined to sign the peace treaty. The Left SR's opposition to the conditions imposed by the empires made them support Trotsky's proposal to abandon the war without signing the peace. Determined internationalists, during the talks they had been convinced that the revolution would spread throughout Europe and that workers' representatives of the Empires would take the reins of the peace negotiations. They argued that the signing of the peace was both a betrayal of the international revolution and a surrender to the bourgeoisie, both national and foreign.

During the Fourth Congress of Soviets, the representatives of the Left SRs opposed, in vain, the ratification of the peace treaty. It was defended by the Bolshevik majority but rejected by a minority, who received the name Left Communists. After the ratification of the treaty, the representatives of the left-communists – who had abstained in the final vote – and the Socialist Revolutionaries – who had voted against ratification – resigned from the government, withdrew from the Council of People's Commissars and announced the termination of their agreement with the Bolsheviks. The governing coalition had lasted just over two months.

=== Peak ===
In the spring the Left SR's influence grew, as support for the Bolsheviks fell. Between April and June, the party grew from some sixty thousand members to one hundred thousand. The socialist revolutionaries rejected the dictatorship of the proletariat and advocated a government controlled by both the working classes and the intellectuals. Their law of socialization of the land had won them a great amount of support with the peasantry and they also had support among the workers of the cities. After their withdrawal from the Government, guerrilla actions in the Baltic and Ukraine against the occupying troops of the Central Empires intensified, while devising terrorist attacks against senior German officials. The party helped to organize a popular, mainly peasant, uprising against the invading empires.

At the Second Party Congress, held from April 17 to 25 in Moscow, Proshian described the rapprochement between the party and the Bolsheviks in some respects until the departure for peace with the Central Powers. Their withdrawal from the Sovnarkom did not, however, entail a total break with the Bolsheviks. The Left SRs continued to participate in numerous government agencies, including the Cheka. Other participants, like former Justice Commissioner Steinberg, were much more critical of the Bolsheviks, especially their repressive and illegal measures. Still, prominent leaders defended staying in the government. Those who considered that the withdrawal of the Government had been a mistake and advocated resuming government work, a majority in the central committee, failed to convince the congress delegates, who ratified the actions taken after the approval of the peace treaty.

In May the relationship between Bolsheviks and Socialist Revolutionaries was markedly worsened by the actions of the Bolsheviks in domestic politics, which joined the disagreements on foreign policy. The signing of the peace treaty, rejected by the Left SRs, the campaign to divide the peasantry and loot from the countryside to supply the cities, (Note: Germany occupied Ukraine, the traditional source of cereal for the rest of the country, which made the food crisis in the cities catastrophic. The Government reacted by approving three decrees to ensure the supply by force. Lenin abandoned state capitalism recently adopted and imposed the "war communism" by which he tried to get the poor peasants to help collect food for the cities, supposedly monopolized by the more affluent peasants, the kulaks .) the final takeover of the soviets by the Bolsheviks with the expulsion of Social Revolutionaries and Mensheviks (14 June), economic and political centralization, the creation of a professional Army with tsarist officers, the restoration of the death penalty (May 21) and the sharpening of terror made the Left SRs an implacable enemy of the Bolsheviks. The substitution of the elected soviets led in their opinion to bureaucratization and a new tyranny. They also condemned the end of workers' control of the factories and the reappearance of the bourgeois managers, who they considered endangered the socialist transformation. (Note: The measure, proposed by Lenin at a VTsIK session on April 29, was due to the economic failure of workers' control of factories, which had exacerbated the country's serious economic crisis. Both the leftist communists and the PSRI rejected it, calling it a step backwards in the revolutionary process.) For the Left SRs, food requisitions in the countryside did not solve the supply problems of the cities, but instead endangered the Soviet system of government. They weakened the Bolsheviks in the countryside while strengthening rural support for the Left Social Revolutionaries. Where the party concentrated on opposing requisitions and "Committees of Poor Peasants", (Note: Established by the last decree on supplying cities, of June 11. The committees, made up of peasants who did not have employees but rather worked their farms without wage labor, should serve to guarantee food collection and facilitate the distribution of manufactured products in rural areas. The Left SRs were opposed to their reliance on peasant soviets, which they seemed to replace.) generally maintained peasant support, even after the July crisis, where they concentrated on opposing the Brest-Litovsk peace.

=== The Fifth Congress of the Soviets and the uprising ===
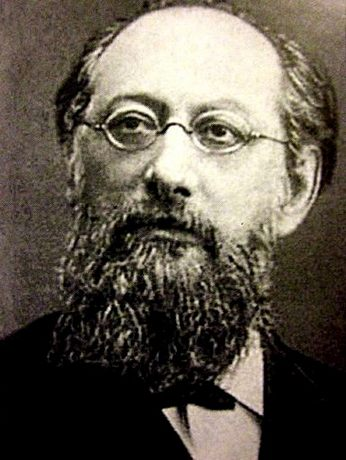
Mark Natanson, a respected old revolutionary leader, one of the founders of the Circle of Tchaikovsky, Land and Liberty and the Socialist Revolutionary Party. In 1917 he became the noble inspirer of the Left Socialist-Revolutionaries, but in 1918 he joined the new Party of Revolutionary Communism

Although some sectors of the party reacted to the repression in the countryside by demanding the separation of the Soviets of the peasant deputies from those of the soldiers and workers, the central committee preferred to press the Bolsheviks demanding the convocation of a new congress of the unified soviets, hoping to subject the government's policy to harsh criticism therein. The leaders of the Left SRs also hoped to gain the support of the left-communists, at odds with Lenin for his capitulation to the Treaty of Brest-Litovsk. The schism in the Bolshevik leadership, however, had settled by the end of the month and the Left SRs could not count on the support of the former dissidents in their confrontation with the government in Congress.

Seeking to secure a majority in the congress, on June 14 Lenin ordered the expulsion of the Mensheviks and the Right SRs from the VTsIK to undermine their chances of getting delegates. Despite pre-congress estimates that the left socialist revolutionaries would eventually have nearly as many delegates as the Bolsheviks, the Bolsheviks sent enough delegates with suspicious credentials to secure a large majority in congress, wiping out the hopes of modifying government policy in congress.

In this environment, the Third Party Congress took place, between June 28 and July 1, a congress that showed greater unity in the party and a certain euphoria for its growth – the number of affiliates had tripled in just three months - and in which greater hostility to the Central Powers and to maintaining peace with them was revealed. Spiridonova raised the provocation of the imperialist invasion to cause uprisings like those taking place in Ukraine, a position that was rejected by other delegates, who were not convinced of the disposition of the population to rise up against the occupiers. Opposition to maintaining the treaty, however, was in a majority among the delegates and the central committee weighed in on carrying out terrorist actions against the German representatives.

In this tense atmosphere began the Fifth Congress of Soviets on July 4. The Left SRs, being in the minority (about 353 (30%) deputies, to the Bolsheviks' 773 (66%) deputies), still openly opposed their former Bolshevik allies, for which they were expelled from the congress.

On July 6, the German Ambassador Wilhelm von Mirbach was assassinated by Yakov Blumkin and Nikolai Andreev, on the orders of the Left SR Central Committee. Initially the Bolsheviks reacted in disbelief, doubting the authorship of the crime. Dzerzhinski himself, sent to the Moscow headquarters of the Cheka in search of the assassins, was arrested by the Left SR central committee, gathered there, when he believed that the socialist revolutionaries were not involved. The intention of the party was not, however, to seize power and overthrow the Bolsheviks, but to force a confrontation with Germany, destroying the results of Brest-Litovsk. Fearful of the German imperialist reaction, Lenin declared, on the contrary, that the murder was part of an attempt by the Left SRs to destroy the government of the soviets and ordered the crushing of the revolt. According to a letter from Spiridonova, the murder of Mirbach was a personal initiative of several leaders of the Socialist Revolutionaries, and there was no rebellion, and all further actions of the Left Socialist Revolutionaries were "self-defense". However, it was beneficial for the Bolsheviks to use the assassination of the ambassador as a pretext for defeating the last opposition party.

Immediately, military measures began to destroy the centers held by the Socialist Revolutionaries, whose delegates to the Fifth Congress were arrested at the Bolshoi Theater that same afternoon. The central committee had not communicated to the hundreds of delegates its intention to assassinate the German representative and they were arrested unaware of what had happened. The party was immediately denounced as counter-revolutionary and determined to lead the country to war with Germany, and the population was called to arms against him. Attempts to take the centers into the hands of the Left SRs in Moscow, however, could not begin firmly on that night due to a lack of troops, and finally began at noon the following day, with the use of artillery against the Cheka headquarters. The bombardment caused the Socialist Revolutionary troops and the Central Committee to leave the building, where Dzerzhinski was abandoned. The main nucleus of the pro-Bolshevik troops were the Latvian units stationed in the capital.

=== Repression and decline ===
The murder triggered the immediate and harsh repression of the political formation; several hundred of its members were arrested and some executed, although many of its leaders managed to escape. Spiridonova, detained when she went to the Bolshoi to explain the actions decided by the central committee to her delegates, remained locked up in the Kremlin until the end of November. The two party newspapers, Znamia trudá (Banner of Work) and Golos trudovogo krestianstva (The Voice of the Working Peasantry) were shut down the day after Mirbach's death. On July 9, the Fifth Congress of Soviets resumed its sessions, without the Social Revolutionary delegates; condemned the Left SR actions as an attempt to seize power, supported the repressive actions of the government and ordered the expulsion of Left SRs from the soviets. The central committee, which had not adequately informed its groups of the change of strategy and the possible consequences of the use of terrorism, left them ill-prepared to face its consequences. Lenin took the opportunity to get rid of the Left SRs as a political rival. In Petrograd, after short but hard fighting, the local headquarters of the Socialist Revolutionaries were seized; Those arrested were gradually released, after no connection to the events in Moscow was found, despite the initial fear of the Bolsheviks. At the nearby Kronstadt naval base, where the influence of the Left SRs was great, the Bolsheviks took political control by force, creating a "revolutionary committee" that separated the Soviet and in practice excluded the Socialist Revolutionaries from the next elections.

The expulsion of the Left SRs from the Central Executive Committee meant that the few sessions of the body that followed the Fifth Congress had a ceremonial character, all opposition to the Bolsheviks having been excluded from them. During the month of July, the Bolsheviks forcibly dissolved the soviets in which the Left SRs had a majority, while expelling the Socialist Revolutionaries where they were a minority and did not agree to reject the actions of their central committee. The party joined the other socialist collectives persecuted by the government; for many historians, it is July 1918 that is considered the milestone of the final formation of a one-party Bolshevik dictatorship in the country, since after July 1918 the representation of other parties in the soviets became insignificant. The attempts of the weakened party in maintaining their opposition to the government was futile and many of its members ended up joining Lenin's party. Already in August, splits in the formation began to emerge; one of them, that of the Party of Narodnik Communists, ended up joining the Bolsheviks in November. The Party of Revolutionary Communism (including Mark Natanson and Andrei Kolegayev), continued to support the Lenin government and joined his party in 1920.

At the Fourth and Final Party Congress, held between October 2 and 7, 1918, the Left SRs claimed that the murder of the German ambassador had been a measure favorable to the world revolution, despite the fact that it ended their alliance with the Bolsheviks and led to the repression of the party. The party's determination to focus on opposing the peace treaty, a matter of secondary interest to the majority of the population at a time of great urban and rural discontent with the Bolshevik government, deprived the Left SRs of the great support with which it had counted in the spring and early summer. The government persecution of the Left SRs disrupted the organization within only a few months. The general meaning of the interventions in the last congress was dejected, unlike those of the previous one. The party was in crisis, both due to the government persecution and internal divisions. Originally opposed to the poor peasant committees created by decree on June 11 to help with the requisitioning of food and to fuel the class struggle in the countryside, the Left SRs in its last congress was more ambiguous due to the new decree from Lenin of August 18 in which it was declared that the committees should only confront the more than well-to-do peasants and not the average peasants. Although the practical consequences of this decree were very few, the tolerance of the committees by the Left SR congress, generally rejected in the countryside, ended up ruining the strength of the party in rural Russia. Many of its members gave up for joining the Bolshevik party.

Some members of the central committee were tried and sentenced to imprisonment on November 27; some of them, like Spiridonova, received a pardon a few days later. The most radical current of the party, around Kamkov and Irina Kakhovskaya, formed a clandestine terrorist group that carried out the murder of the German Commander in Ukraine, Hermann von Eichhorn and other minor actions, disrupted by the authorities. The current favorable to Spiridonova advocated a peasant uprising against the Bolsheviks, the abolition of the Sovnarkom and the transfer of government power to a democratically elected VTsIK, the end of the Cheka, the poor peasant committees and requisitions in the countryside. In early 1919, some of the leaders were arrested again; in 1920 part of the party was able to re-establish itself until May 1921. Periods of relative tolerance alternated with more habitual periods of persecution by the Cheka and clandestine activity. Their relative influence among the workers and peasants in Ukraine in 1919 did not endanger the government, so they were allowed to continue their activity. In October 1919 and again in May 1920 (after another brief legalization), the Left SRs ended their confrontations with the Government in order to focus on opposing the counterrevolutionary threat of the White Armies. With the subsequent red victory, the socialist revolutionaries resumed their opposition activities in the late 1920s. The remains of the party were removed by the arrests carried out during the Kronstadt rebellion, that the party had supported. A number of Left Socialist Revolutionaries, such as Alexander Antonov, played a significant political and military role during the Russian Civil War, joining the green rebels and fighting both the Bolsheviks and the White Guards. They survived residually until 1923–1924. The Left Socialist Revolutionaries divided into a number of factions. The Left SR "activists", led by Donat Cherepanov, Spiridonova and Kamkov, took part in armed demonstrations against the leadership of the Soviet Union. The "legalist" movement, led by Steinberg, advocated public criticism of the Bolsheviks and the struggle against them only by peaceful means. In the years 1922–1923, the legalist movement united with the Socialist-Revolutionary-Maximalist groups and the Socialist-Revolutionary "People's" group in the Association of Left Narodism. The leaders who survived this stage, either in prison or in internal exile, fell victims to the Great Purge in the late 1930s (Algasov, Kamkov and Karelin were shot in 1938, while Spiridonova was executed in 1941).

== Ideas ==
After the Fourth Party Congress (September–October 1918), the political and economic program of the Left Socialist Revolutionaries moved to positions close to anarchism and revolutionary syndicalism. In their opinion, industrial enterprises should be transferred to the self-government of labor collectives, united in a common federation of manufacturers. Consumption had to be organized through a union of cooperatives – local self-governing consumer societies, united in a common federation. Economic life should be organized by the joint arrangements of these two associations, for which it was necessary to create special economic councils, elected from production and consumer organizations. Political and military power should have been concentrated in the hands of political councils elected by the working people on a territorial basis.

The Ukrainian Left Socialist Revolutionaries (led by Yakov Brown) believed that along with economic and political councils, councils on ethnic issues should be elected by representatives of various ethnic communities of workers – Jews, Ukrainians, Russians, Greeks, etc., which, in their opinion, would be especially relevant for multinational Ukraine. Each person received the right to freely "enroll" in any community of their choice – ethnicity was considered by the Left Socialist Revolutionaries to be a matter of free self-determination of a person, the result of his personal choice, and not a question of blood. The ethnic councils of workers, forming, as it were, the third chamber of power of councils, were to deal with the development of culture, schools, institutions, educational systems in local languages, etc.

== See also ==
- List of members of the Central Committee of the Socialist Revolutionary Party
- Left-wing uprisings against the Bolsheviks
- Russian Revolution/Russian Civil War
- Left SR Uprising
- Tambov Rebellion
- Green armies
- Left Kuomintang

== Bibliography ==
- Shub, David (1948). Lenin. Doubleday. p. 284.
