= Grigoriy Pavlovich Chukhnin =

- Григорий Павлович Чухнин
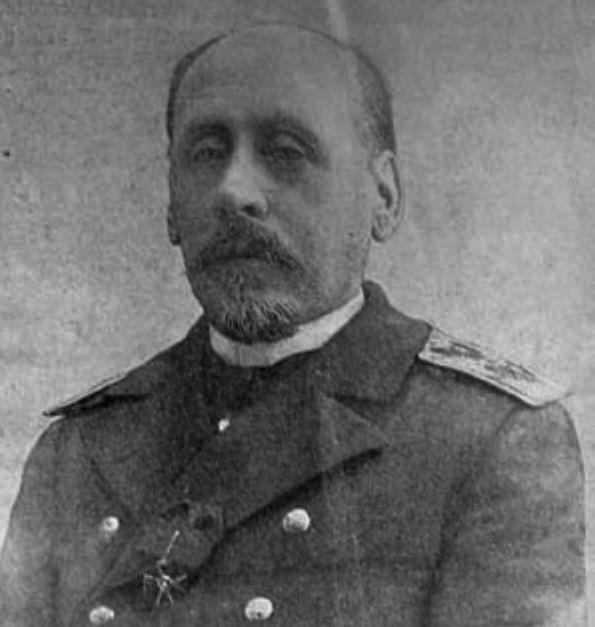
- Born: 1848; Nikolaev, Russian Empire
- Died: 28 June 1906 (aged 57–58); Sevastopol, Russian Empire
- Military career
- Allegiance: Russian Empire
- Branch: Imperial Russian Navy
- Service years: 1869–1906
- Rank: Vice-Admiral

Grigoriy Pavlovich Chukhnin (Russian: Григо́рий Па́влович Чухни́н; 1848 – 28 June 1906) was an officer of the Imperial Russian Navy during the late 19th and early 20th centuries. In 1904, when he was director of the Kuznetsov Naval Academy, he was nearly offered command of the Second Pacific Squadron before the command was ultimately given to Admiral Rozhestvensky. Rozhestvensky later requested his replacement by Chukhnin during the Pacific voyage, but was denied. In late 1904, Chukhnin was appointed to command of the Black Sea Fleet. He commanded the Black Sea Fleet in 1905 during the mutiny on the battleship Potemkin. "Chukhnin had dealt cruelly with the sailors of the Red Battleship [the Potemkin]: four were shot, two hanged, several dozen were sent to hard labor[...] but he failed to instill terror in anyone, and succeeded only in intensifying the mutinous feelings within the navy." In November 1905 he helped crush the Black Sea Fleet uprising. He was assassinated in July 1906, after an earlier attempt in February 1906 failed.

== Notes ==
Citations

== Sources ==
- Bascomb, Neal (2007). Red Mutiny: Eleven Fateful Days on the Battleship Potemkin. Boston: Houghton Mifflin. ISBN 978-0-618-59206-7.
- Melvin, Mungo (2017). Sevastopol's Wars: Crimea from Potemkin to Putin. Bloomsbury Publishing. ISBN 9781472822277.
- Pleshakov, Constantine (2002). The Tsar's Last Armada: The Epic Voyage to the Battle of Tsushima. ISBN 0-465-05792-6.
- Zebroski, Robert (2003). "The Battleship Potemkin and Its Discontents, 1905". In Bell, Christopher M.; Elleman, Bruce A. (eds.). Naval Mutinies of the Twentieth Century: An International Perspective. London: Frank Cass. pp. 7–25. ISBN 0-203-58450-3.
