= Maria Spiridonova =

Russian revolutionary (1884–1941)

- Мария Спиридонова
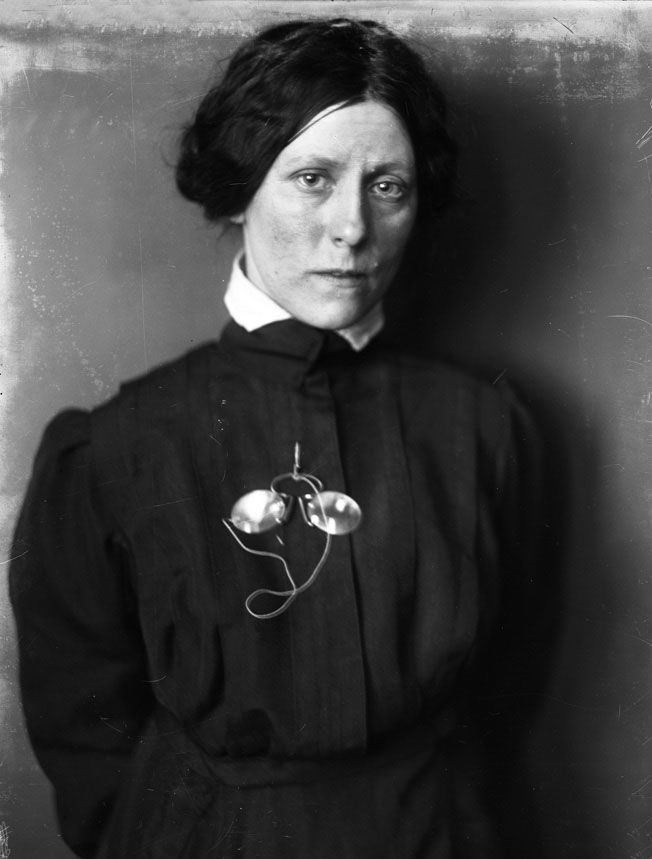

Head of the Peasant Section of the All-Russian Central Executive Committee
- In office 13 January 1918 – 8 July 1918
- Chairman: Yakov Sverdlov
- Preceded by: Position established
- Succeeded by: Position abolished

Member of the Russian Constituent Assembly
- In office 20 January 1918 – 20 January 1918 (Note: The Constituent Assembly was declared dissolved by the Bolshevik-Left SR Soviet government in the wake of its first session.)
- Preceded by: Constituency established
- Succeeded by: Constituency abolished
- Constituency: Vladimir

Personal details
- Born: Maria Alexandrovna Spiridonova; 16 October 1884 Tambov, Tambov Governorate, Russian Empire
- Died: 11 September 1941 (aged 56) Oryol, Oryol Oblast, Russian SFSR, Soviet Union
- Party: Socialist Revolutionary Party (1905–1917); Left Socialist-Revolutionaries (1917–1921)

Maria Alexandrovna Spiridonova (Russian: Мария Александровна Спиридонова; 16 October 1884 – 11 September 1941) was a Narodnik-inspired Russian revolutionary. In 1906, as a novice member of a local combat group of the Tambov Socialists-Revolutionaries (SRs), she assassinated Gavriil Luzhenovsky, a Tsarist security official. Her subsequent abuse by police earned her enormous popularity with the opponents of Tsarism throughout the empire and even abroad.

After spending over 11 years in Siberian prisons she was freed after the February Revolution of 1917, and returned to European Russia as a heroine of the destitute, and especially of the peasants. According to G.D.H. Cole, she was, along with Alexandra Kollontai, one of the most prominent women leaders during the Russian Revolution, leading the Left Socialist-Revolutionaries to initially side with Vladimir Lenin and the Bolsheviks, and then to break with them.

From January 1918 onwards, Spiridonova faced repression from the Soviet government, as she was repeatedly arrested, imprisoned, briefly detained in a mental sanitarium, and sent into internal exile, before eventually being shot in 1941 in the Medvedevsky Forest massacre. A successful campaign was run to discredit her name and portray her as a hysterical extremist, and she was "forced into oblivion". In 1958, when publishing the fourth volume of A History of Socialist Thought, G.D.H. Cole wrote that nothing was known of what had happened to her after 1920. Twenty years later, Richard Stites was still uncertain whether her death occurred in 1937 or 1941. Only after the end of Stalinism and the fall of the Soviet Union did it gradually become possible to reconstruct the last decades of her life.

== Early life ==
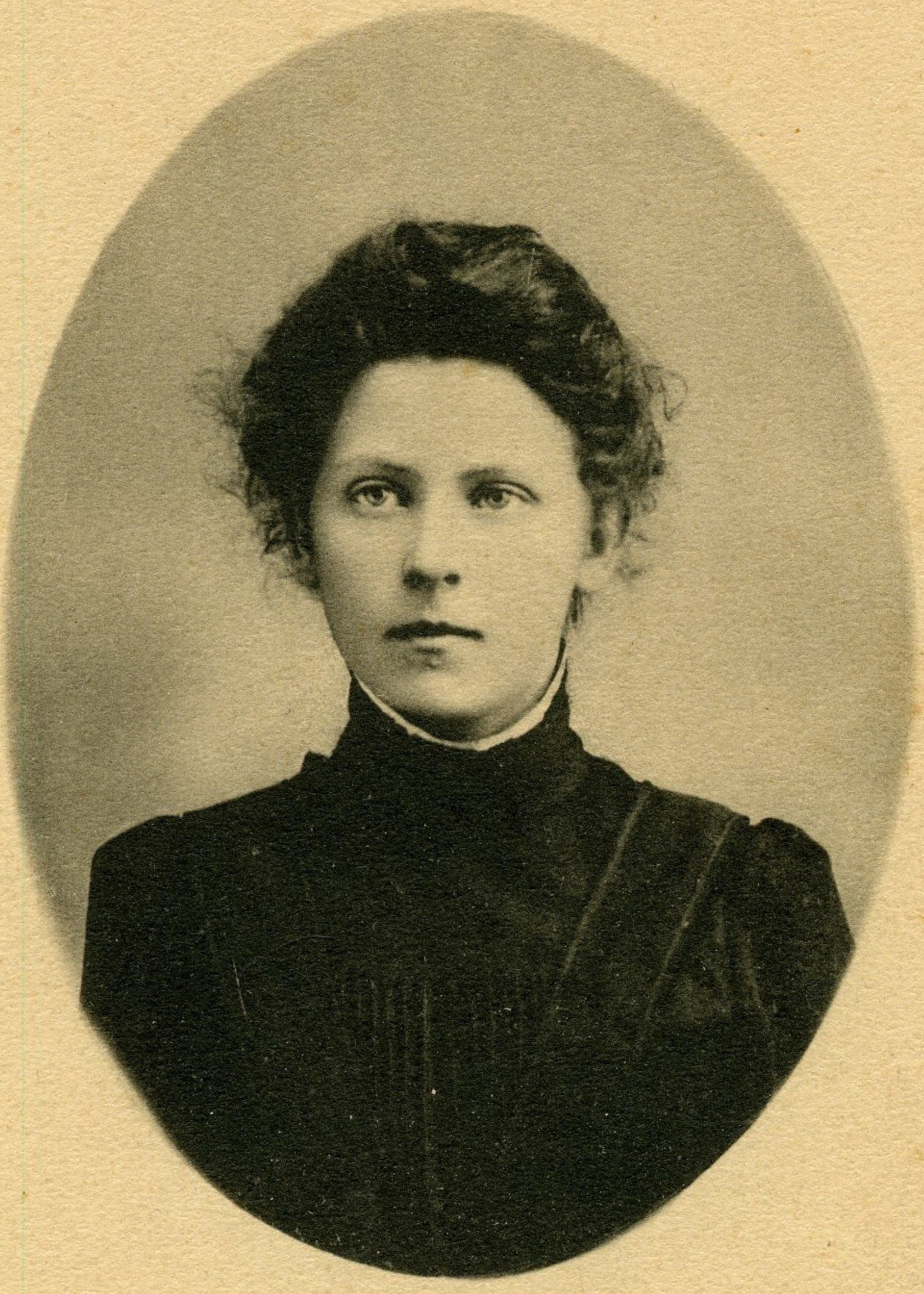
Spiridonova before 1906

Spiridonova was born in the city of Tambov, located approximately 480 kilometres (300 mi) south-southeast of Moscow. Her father, a bank official, was a member of the non-hereditary minor nobility of the Russian Empire. She attended the local gymnasium until 1902, when the death of her father, and a first attack of tuberculosis, caused her to drop out. She studied dentistry in Moscow for a short while, before returning to Tambov to work as a clerk for the local Assembly of the Nobility. She soon became involved in political activism and was arrested during the student demonstrations of March 1905. In September 1905 she applied for training as a feldsher (a health care professional similar to a physician assistant) but was rejected due to her political record. Instead, she joined the Party of Socialists–Revolutionaries (SRs) and became a full-time activist. During this time, she formed a relationship with Vladimir Vol'skii, a local SR leader.

Like most SRs, she shared the Narodniks' philosophy of assassination and terrorism as a weapon of revolution, and was one of hundreds of SRs who, in the years around the 1905 Revolution, attacked the Russian state and its leaders.

== Luzhenovsky assassination ==
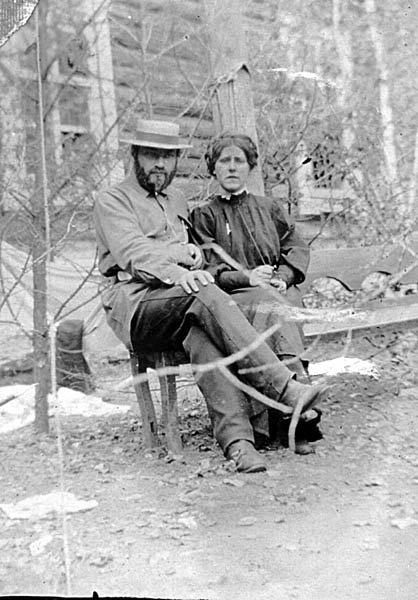
Spiridonova and Grigory Gershuni, founder of the SR Combat Organization, in Akatuy, 1906

Spiridonova's target was Gavriil Nikolayevich Luzhenovsky, a landowner and Tambov provincial councillor who had been appointed district security chief in Borisoglebsk, a town southeast of Tambov. Luzhenovsky, also a local leader of the Union of the Russian People (the most important branch of the Black Hundred), was known for his harsh suppression of peasant unrest in the district, and the SR committee in Tambov had "passed a death sentence on him". Spiridonova volunteered to kill him. She stalked Luzhenovsky for several days, and finally got her chance at the Borisoglebsk railway station on 16 January 1906. Disguised as a secondary school student, she fired several shots from a revolver and hit Luzhenovsky five times. He died on 10 February 1906.

Unable to escape, Spiridonova tried to shoot herself but was restrained, brutally beaten and arrested by Luzhenovsky's Cossack guard. She was then transferred to the local police station where she was stripped naked, searched and mocked by her captors. She was interrogated and tortured for more than half a day by two government officials, P.F. Avramov, head of the Cossack guard, and T.S. Zhdanov, a local police officer. That night she was transported to Tambov by train. During the journey, Avramov subjected her to further ill-treatment and sexual harassment, possibly rape.

The Luzhenovsky assassination was one of close to two hundred acts of SR "individual terror" during the 1905 Revolution and the two following years' turmoil. It received mainly local attention until the following month, when Spiridonova succeeded in leaking a very well-thought-out letter to the press. It described the treatment she had received, including threats of gang rape directed at her, and hinted that Avramov might have raped her on the train to Tambov. The letter was published on 12 February 1906 by Rus, a liberal newspaper in Saint Petersburg, and soon taken up by others, becoming an immediate sensation with their readers.

Progressive public opinion in Russia traditionally tended to consider terrorism with a certain degree of understanding, as it was regarded as a natural reaction against autocracy. For example, in 1878, a jury caused a sensation by acquitting populist terrorist Vera Zasulich despite her pleading guilty to causing serious injury to Colonel Fyodor Trepov during a failed attempt to assassinate him. In the case of Spiridonova, many were outraged by the appalling cruelty to a prisoner, especially as she was an attractive young woman. Liberal circles throughout Russia condemned the Tambov authorities. Spiridonova was described as "a pure, virginal being, a flower of spiritual beauty [...] [being put] into the shaggy paws of brutally repulsive, brutally malicious, brutally salacious orangutans".

Rus sent reporter Vsevolod A. Vladimirov to Tambov. He produced seven sensational articles that appeared in March 1906. These articles exaggerated Spiridonova's mistreatment and injuries, and more explicitly touched on her alleged rape. Vladimirov also glossed over Spiridonova's political convictions, portraying her as a genteel, high-principled victim of the tyrannical Russian system. This annoyed the Tambov SRs almost as much as it did the conservatives and the authorities. Spiridonova herself repudiated Vladimirov's account.

On 11 March, Spiridonova was tried and convicted of Luzhenovsky's murder and sentenced to death. However, the tribunal also asked that the sentence be commuted to penal servitude in Siberia, in view of her ill health. This was approved on 20 March. The liberal press continued its campaign in her support. On 2 April, Avramov was himself assassinated, creating a further sensation.

The government released its report on the case on 8 April. The report acknowledged that Spiridonova had been beaten by the Cossacks at the time of her arrest and that Avramov had verbally abused her on the train, but denied all the more lurid accusations. This was denounced by some as a whitewash.

Secret letters from Spiridonova in prison to her sister Yulia, a fellow SR, had been seized by police on 19 February and were summarized by the Tambov deputy prosecutor in a report to the national authorities. His extracts indicate that Spiridonova consciously participated in the image-making that was going on outside, suggesting what should be emphasized and what should be played down. A request in one letter not to reveal her "romantic history", presumably her relationship with Volsky, was quoted. Many liberals called this an attempt to slander her morals. The governor of Tambov had known about the affair (Spiridonova appealed for a meeting with Volsky, whom she described as her fiancé although he was already married), but did not pass on the information, which would have demolished Spiridonova's "virginal" image.

== Exile to Siberia ==
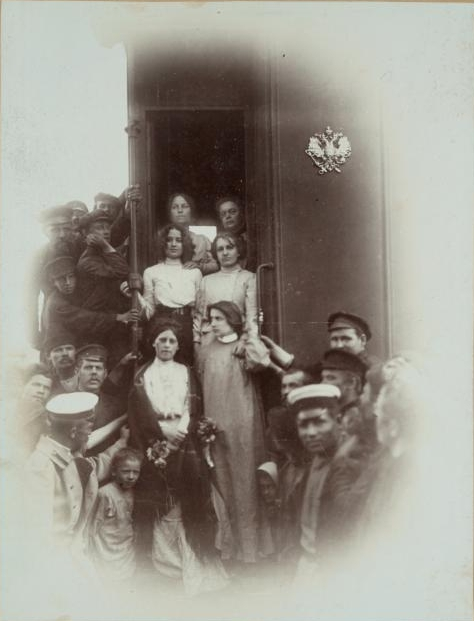
The Shesterka ("Six") photographed at the Omsk station during their triumphal transfer to Siberia (Spiridonova is the first on the left in the foreground)

Spiridonova was sent to Siberia in the company of five other prominent female SR terrorists. The group was sometimes called the Shesterka ("Six"). As a result of the press campaign, Spiridonova was the most famous. She was also young, attractive, and an ethnic Russian (at least four of the others were Jewish, Belarusian, and Ukrainian). The Shesterka were transported by train from Moscow to the Nerchinsk katorga, a system of penal labor colonies in Transbaikal (east of Lake Baikal and near the border of China). Their slow journey lasted around a month and turned into a kind of triumphal progress: the train was met at every stop by growing crowds of sympathizers. Each time, although she was suffering from a serious recurrence of tuberculosis, Spiridonova would get up from her couch, greet the audience with smiles and patiently answer their numerous questions, expounding the SR political program. Aleksandra Izmailovich, one of the Shesterka, later commented:

The crowds did not know the rest of us, but who did not know her name? [...] It had become a banner uniting all who seethed with holy indignation—SRs, SDs, Kadets, ordinary people unaffiliated with parties. She belonged not only to the SR Party. She belonged to all who carried her in their hearts as a banner of their protest.

— Aleksandra Adolfovna Izmailovich, "Iz Proshlogo", Katorga i ssylka (1923), no. 7, pp. 142–191; (1924), no. 1, pp. 143–174

Spiridonova and her comrades were first detained in the Akatuy penal colony. The prison regime of the colony was exceedingly mild, more similar to a sort of internal exile or political confinement than to a real prison. In 1907, however, they were moved to the new female colony that had been established at Maltsev, another centre of the Nerchinsk katorga. Here the rules of detention were somewhat stricter, though not so extreme as in "the regimes of punishment and mistreatment that 'politicals' endured elsewhere" (including beatings, floggings and isolation in dark, freezing cells). "For the Maltsev women there was no forced labor, only enforced isolation from the outside world in which each day was like the next and the one that had gone before".

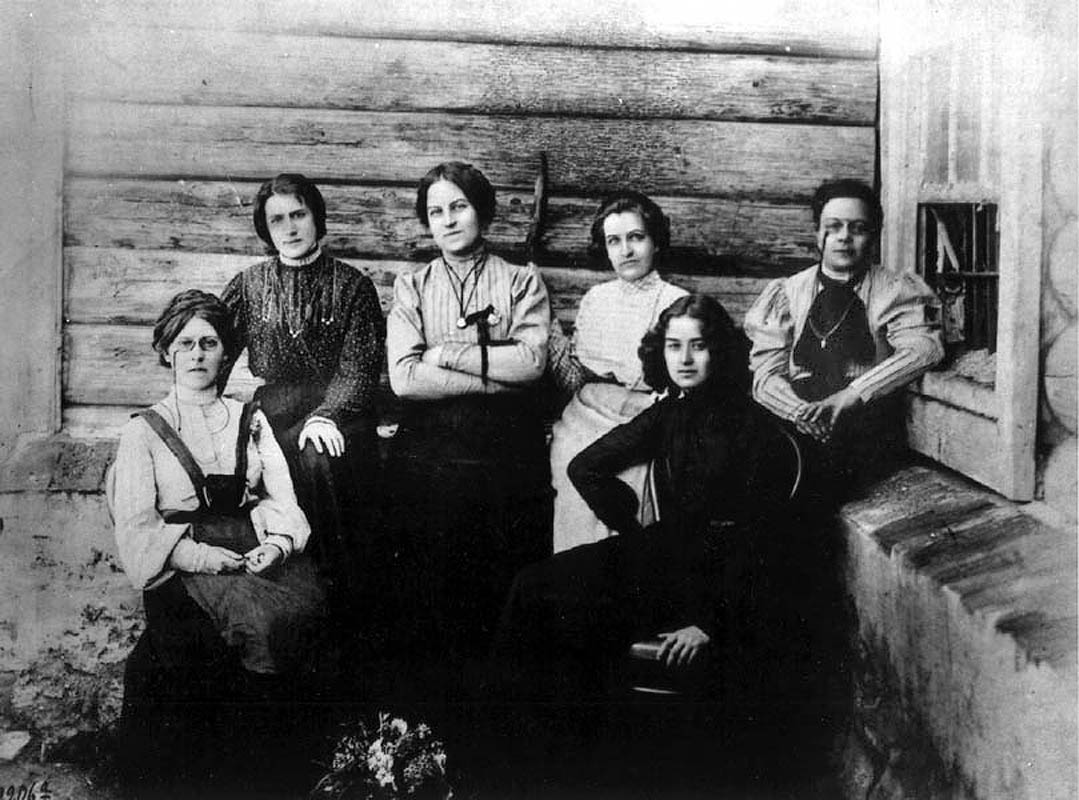
The Shesterka ("Six") in exile at Akatuy (Spiridonova is the first on the left)

In 1908, a young Ukrainian maximalist, Irina Konstantinovna Kakhovskaya, arrived at Maltsev. She had been convicted of involvement in a terrorist group. Kakhovskaya was a descendant of Decembrist revolutionary Pyotr Grigoryevich Kakhovsky, who had been hanged in 1826 for assassinating Saint Petersburg Governor Mikhail Andreyevich Miloradovich and another Grenadier officer. She formed a special friendship with Spiridonova and Izmailovich, a bond of political and personal sisterhood that would last throughout their lives.

In April 1911, 28 female inmates, including Spiridonova, were transferred back to Akatuy where the conditions of their detention were further worsened and they were forced to work in a bookbindery. The constant physical work, however, was eventually welcomed by the detainees and made their prison life more tolerable.

== Left SR leader ==
=== Accommodation with the revolution ===
After the February Revolution of 1917, Spiridinova was released from incarceration at the women's Akatuy prison by a general amnesty covering imprisoned political criminals. According to Alexander Rabinowitch, Spiridonova was widely esteemed by the common people of Russia, being venerated by many peasants as very nearly a saint.

Spiridonova traveled from Siberia to Moscow to attend the 3rd National Congress of the Party of Socialists-Revolutionaries (the SRs) late in May 1917, but she was not elected to the governing Central Committee of the party. Despite this failure, Spiridonova became deeply involved in party affairs as a leader of the SR left wing and of the party's organization in the capital city of Petrograd. She was also involved in work helping to establish soviets amongst the peasantry.

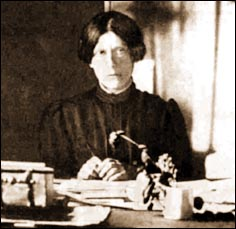
Spiridonova at work as a Left SR leader

Following the October Revolution, Spiridonova cast her lot with the Left SRs, who had split from their old party and sided with their erstwhile rivals of the Bolshevik Party. She was extremely supportive of efforts to forge a unity government between the Bolsheviks, the Left SRs, and the other socialist parties represented in the Soviets, but when it proved impossible to reach a general agreement, she supported the Left SRs entering into a coalition government with only the Bolsheviks. Her name was included by the railroad union (Vikzhel) in a list of possible candidate ministers for the unity government, but she did not take a ministerial role in the new Bolshevik-Left SR government. Instead, she was appointed head of the Peasant Section of the Central Executive Committee of the All-Russian Soviet of Workers', Peasants', and Soldiers' Deputies (VTsIK), making her nominally a chief official over peasant affairs. She was later one of a handful of Left SR leaders offering early support for Lenin's decision to agree to the draconian peace terms offered by the government of Imperial Germany in the Treaty of Brest-Litovsk. As the head of the Peasant Section of the VTsIK, Spiridonova appeared almost exclusively focused on winning the approval of the soviets and enforcement of an SR-inspired law of land socialization, constituting agrarian reform. The law was eventually passed on 19 February 1918. Consequently, for some months she strived primarily to safeguard the alliance with the Bolsheviks, even at the cost of being temporarily sidelined within her own party.

On 18 January 1918, at the inaugural meeting of the Constituent Assembly, both the Left SRs and the Bolsheviks proposed Spiridonova as their candidate for the chair, but centrist SR Víktor Mikhailovich Chernov was elected instead. The Assembly was dissolved for good after the end of that same first session.

=== Revolt against Bolshevism ===
The honeymoon between Spiridonova (and the Left SRs generally) and the Bolsheviks was short-lived. Late in the spring of 1918, Bolshevik military detachments were formed to conduct forced requisitions of grain in a desperate effort to stave off famine in the cities amidst economic collapse. According to American historian Alexander Rabinowitch, "the brutal Bolshevik grain-procurement policy and the devastating impact on the peasantry of the Soviet government's vast territorial and increasingly onerous economic concessions to Imperial Germany" caused widespread discontent in the countryside and the Peasant Section of the VTsIK was overwhelmed with complaints and protests. As head of the Section, Spiridonova was especially aware of the deepening misery of peasants throughout the country. By late spring 1918, the initial unity between Left SRs and Bolsheviks turned to rivalry over the future of the revolution and a competition ensued for control of the 5th Congress of Soviets, scheduled to begin in Moscow on 4 July 1918.

Rabinowitch thus summarized the prelude to what he would later term "the suicide of the Left SRs":

By this time popular disenchantment with Bolshevik rule was already well advanced, not only in rural but also in urban Russia. The primary beneficiaries of this nationwide grass-roots shift of public opinion were the Left SRs. During the second half of June 1918, it was an open question which of the two parties would have a majority at the Fifth All-Russians Congress of Soviets [...]
In this altogether uncertain and fluid situation, the Left SR Central Committee, at a meeting on 24 June chaired by Spiridonova, resolved to employ terrorism against high German officials, if necessary, to provoke immediate termination of the Brest treaty. In the evening of 4 July, virtually from the moment the Fifth Congress of Soviets opened in Moscow's Bolshoi Theater, it was clear to the Left SRs that the Bolsheviks had effectively "fabricated" a sizeable majority in the congress and consequently, that there was no hope whatever of utilizing it to force a fundamental change in the government's pro-German, antipeasant policies. Spiridonova and her colleagues now concluded that resolute action outside the congress along the line sanctioned by the Left SR Central Committee on 24 June was unavoidable.

— Alexander Rabinovitch, 'Maria Spiridonova's "Last Testament";' The Russian Review, Vol. 54, N. 3, July 1995, pp. 426–427

On 6 July 1918, two members of the Left SR Party, Iakov Bliumkin and Nicolai Andreev, assassinated German ambassador Wilhelm Mirbach. Spiridonova immediately assumed the "political" responsibility for the attack on behalf of the party's Central Committee. In her 1937 letter to the NKVD (see below), she claimed also to have directed the attack (even showing a sort of "professional' pride).

The confrontation with the government, however, did not evolve as the Left SR leadership expected. At the time of Mirbach's assassination, the Left SRs enjoyed undoubted military superiority in the Moscow area and within the Cheka, but they "showed no inclination to press home" this advantage: they appeared "much less interested in seizing power themselves than they were in calling for a popular uprising to force the Bolsheviks to change their policies. The Left SRs had no idea where this uprising would end up: they were happy to leave that to the 'revolutionary creativity of the masses'." For his part, Lenin, far from fueling a new conflagration with Germany, used Mirbach's assassination as a pretext for the suppression of the Left SR organization, the terrorist attack being immediately portrayed as a straightforward uprising against Soviet power. Lenin promptly summoned Jukums Vācietis, the commander of the Latvian Riflemen, now headquartered in the outskirts of the capital, and secured their support; albeit not immediately available, they were the only military forces capable of effectively opposing the units controlled by the Left Social Revolutionaries. While the latter continued "to rise up" without even moving from their barracks, Spiridonova and her comrades hastened to the Bolshoi Theatre, where she delivered an inflamed speech against the Bolshevik regime before the ongoing Congress of Soviets, which they evidently regarded as the supreme authority in the Soviet republic. In the meantime, the theatre security forces proceeded to seal the building and detain all the Left SR delegates therein. Later, the Bolsheviks recaptured the Cheka headquarters at the Lubyanka and overcame the Cheka Combat Detachment commanded by Left SR Dmitry Popov, the unit that had taken over the Pokrovsky barracks and arrested Felix Dzerzhinsky when he had gone there to arrest Mirbach's assassins. Thus ended the Left SR uprising, and historian Orlando Figes notes that "it was not a coup d'état but—not unlike the Bolsheviks' own July uprising of 1917—a suicidal act of public protest to galvanize 'the masses' against the regime. At no point did the Left SRs ever really think of taking power. They were only 'playing at revolution'."

Spiridonova and many other Left SR leaders were imprisoned in Moscow, her Peasant Section of the VTsIK was dissolved, and an undisclosed number of other party members (over 200 according to Spiridonova herself) were summarily executed.

After she was kept in jail for several months, it was announced that Spiridonova was to be tried on 1 December 1918. To undercut the possibility of a potentially volatile situation developing, a secret trial was conducted on 27 November instead. Spiridonova was sentenced to one year in prison for her part in the Left SR revolt but was amnestied the next day.

=== Further imprisonment ===
Spiridonova became the voice of a radical faction of the Left SRs opposed to any accommodation with the "Communist" regime (as the Bolsheviks now styled themselves) and she publicly denounced the government for having betrayed the revolution with its policies and actions. Despite her bitter refusal to compromise, Spiridonova remained separate from the party's ultra-left terrorist wing, focusing on the idea of revitalizing the system of Soviets in opposition to the rule of the Communist party by bureaucratic edict.

In January 1919, after another public speech in opposition to the Communist government, Spiridonova was arrested by the Moscow Cheka. She was tried once more on 24 February 1919, with ex Left Communist leader Nikolai Bukharin as the sole witness for the prosecution. Bukharin charged that Spiridonova was mentally ill and a menace to society in the deadly political atmosphere of the Russian Civil War. Spiridonova was found guilty and sentenced to one year's incarceration in a mental sanitarium, effectively removing her from politics.

Instead of a sanitarium, Spiridonova was actually confined in a small holding cell inside a military barracks in the Kremlin, where her already frail health rapidly deteriorated. Left SR militants organized her escape on 2 April 1919. Spiridonova subsequently lived underground in Moscow as a peasant woman under the pseudonym Onufrieva. She was rearrested 19 months later, ill with typhus and suffering from an unstated nervous disorder; it was "the night of October 26, 1920, exactly three years after the victory of the October Revolution". This time, the Communist authorities proved somewhat more merciful than usual: given her extremely poor health, Spiridonova was initially put under house arrest. Alexandra Izmailovich was transferred from Butyrka prison and charged with nursing her, along with the party co-leader, Boris Kamkov, then possibly Spiridonova's romantic partner as well. Kamkov was with her at the moment of arrest and was permitted to stay beside her for the next four months. She was later transferred to a Cheka medical facility, then confined in a psychiatric prison.

She was finally released to the custody of two Left SR comrades on 18 November 1921 under the condition that she cease all political activity. Historian Alexander Rabinowitch comments that there is no evidence that she ever violated this condition. Spiridonova's active political life was at an end.

== Persecution, death and legacy ==
Despite her withdrawal from active politics, she was arrested again on 16 May 1923. At the time, large numbers of moderate socialist and liberal leaders were permitted or obliged to emigrate to the West (including the two Left Socialist-Revolutionaries to whom Spiridonova had been entrusted). Nevertheless, Spiridonova was charged with "having made preparations to flee abroad" and sentenced to three years of administrative exile, a sentence that was repeatedly extended. She spent the rest of the 1920s in Kaluga (1923–25), Samarkand (1925–28) and Tashkent (1928–30). In 1930, after Joseph Stalin's consolidation of power, Spiridonova was arrested once again. Charged with maintaining contacts abroad, she was sentenced to three more years of administrative exile (twice extended), this time in Ufa, capital of the Bashkir Republic. She lived with her former prison partner Izmailovich during the whole period of exile. Kakhovskaya also spent time with them as often and as long as she was permitted to. In the mid-1920s, Spiridonova had also married her fellow exilee Ilya Andreevich Mayorov, a Left SR leader of peasant origin and erstwhile Deputy People's Commissar for Agriculture.

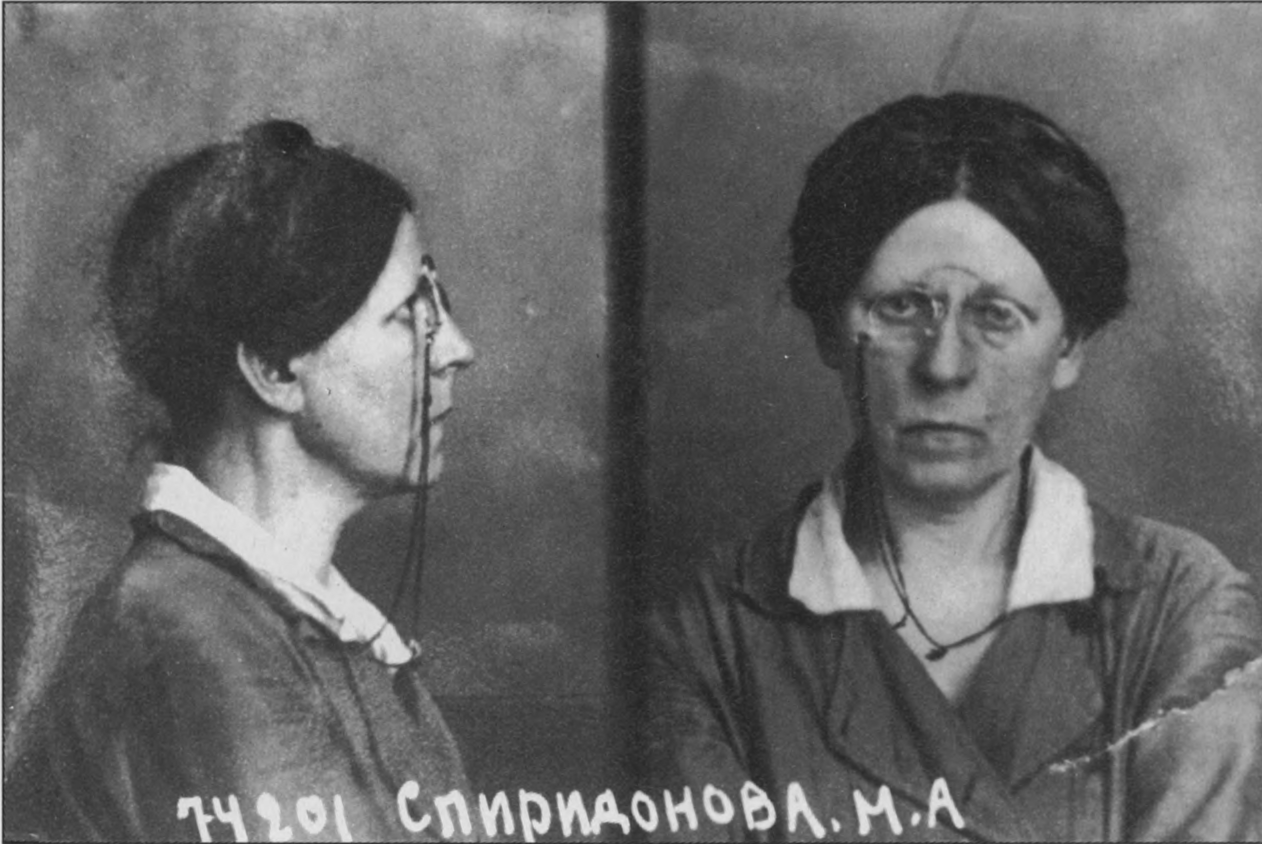
Spiridonova's prison mugshot, c. 1937

In 1937, Spiridonova was arrested yet again, with several former party comrades including her husband, her teenaged stepson, her invalid father-in-law, Alexandra Izmailovich, Irina Kakhovskaya and the latter's aged aunt. The group was accused of plotting to create a united counter-revolutionary center and to assassinate Bashkir Communist leaders. Spiridonova underwent cruel interrogation in prison in Ufa and in Moscow for several months, without admitting any guilt, although a confession was extorted from her husband. In November 1937, she wrote a long letter to the 4th Section of the Main Directorate of State Security (GUGB) within the People's Commissariat for Internal Affairs (NKVD) from her cell, protesting against the prison treatment inflicted on her, contesting the correctness of the judicial procedure and rejecting every single charge. The letter proclaimed that she fully supported the construction of socialism and acknowledged the Communist leadership. However, she concluded what was later called her "last testament" with a vibrant heart-felt plea against capital punishment, twice abolished in the aftermaths of the February and October Revolutions and twice re-established by subsequent governments despite vehement protests from the Left Social-Revolutionaries:

I only disagree with the fact that the death penalty remains in our system. Today the State is powerful enough to build socialism without resorting to the death penalty and should not include such a statute among its laws. [...] The best thoughts of humanity and the passionate work of hearts and minds for centuries on end have seen the elimination of this institution as a crowning achievement. The axe, the guillotine, the rope, the bullet, and the electric chair are representative of the Middle Ages. [...]

It is permissible and necessary to kill in a civil war while protecting the rights of the revolution and the working class, but only when there are no other means at hand to defend the revolution. When, however, powerful means of defense such as we have exist, capital punishment becomes an institution of evil, corrupting in countless ways those who make use of it.

I think constantly about the psychology of thousands of people, about those dealing with technical questions, the executioners, members of the firing squads, those who conduct the condemned to their deaths, about the platoon of soldiers shooting in the semidarkness at the bound, defenseless, and half-crazed prisoner. This should never, never be permitted in our country. We have apple blossoms in our country, we have motion and science, art, beauty, we have books and universal education and health care, we have the sun and children to raise, we have truth. And together with all this we have this enormous corner where cruel and bloody deeds are performed. In connection with this question, I often think of Stalin, who is, after all, an intelligent man, seemingly interested in the transformation of objects and hearts. How is it that he does not see that the death penalty must be abolished?! You started using this death penalty with us Left SRs and you should end it with us, restricting its scope to my person, who, as you assert, has not been disarmed. But you must put an end to the death penalty. [...]

— Maria Alexandrovna Spiridonova, letter to the 4th Section of the GUPB – NKVD – URSS, Moscow, 13 November 1937 (11. 98–99)

On 7 January 1938, she was eventually sentenced to 25 years in prison by the Military Collegium of the Supreme Court. After a hunger strike, she was held in isolation at Oryol Prison. On 11 September 1941 (three months after the German invasion of the USSR), Spiridonova, Izmailovich, Mayorov and over 150 other political prisoners (among them Christian Rakovsky and Olga Kameneva) were executed by order of Stalin in the Medvedevsky Forest massacre.

Despite Kakhovskaya's efforts after the 1956 20th Congress of the Communist Party of the Soviet Union, "not until 1990 were the 1941 charges against Spiridonova rescinded [...] Finally, in 1992, [she] was exonerated of the charges for which she had been imprisoned and exiled beginning in 1918, and was fully rehabilitated" by the Russian Federation. The exact burial place of the Medvedevsky Forest victims has never been found.

== Spiridonova in Russian culture ==
Some of Russia's major poets, such as Maksimilian Voloshin, dedicated their poems to Spiridonova during the First Revolution. Russian historian Yaroslav Leontiev believes that Boris Pasternak also immortalized Spiridonova (but already without being able to name her directly), in the first few lines of his poem "The Year 1905", published in 1926.
