= Medvedev Forest massacre =

1941 NKVD mass execution of Oryol prisoners

Coordinates: 53°01′04″N 36°09′48″E

Memorial to victims of Stalinism
erected in Medvedevsky Forest in 1990
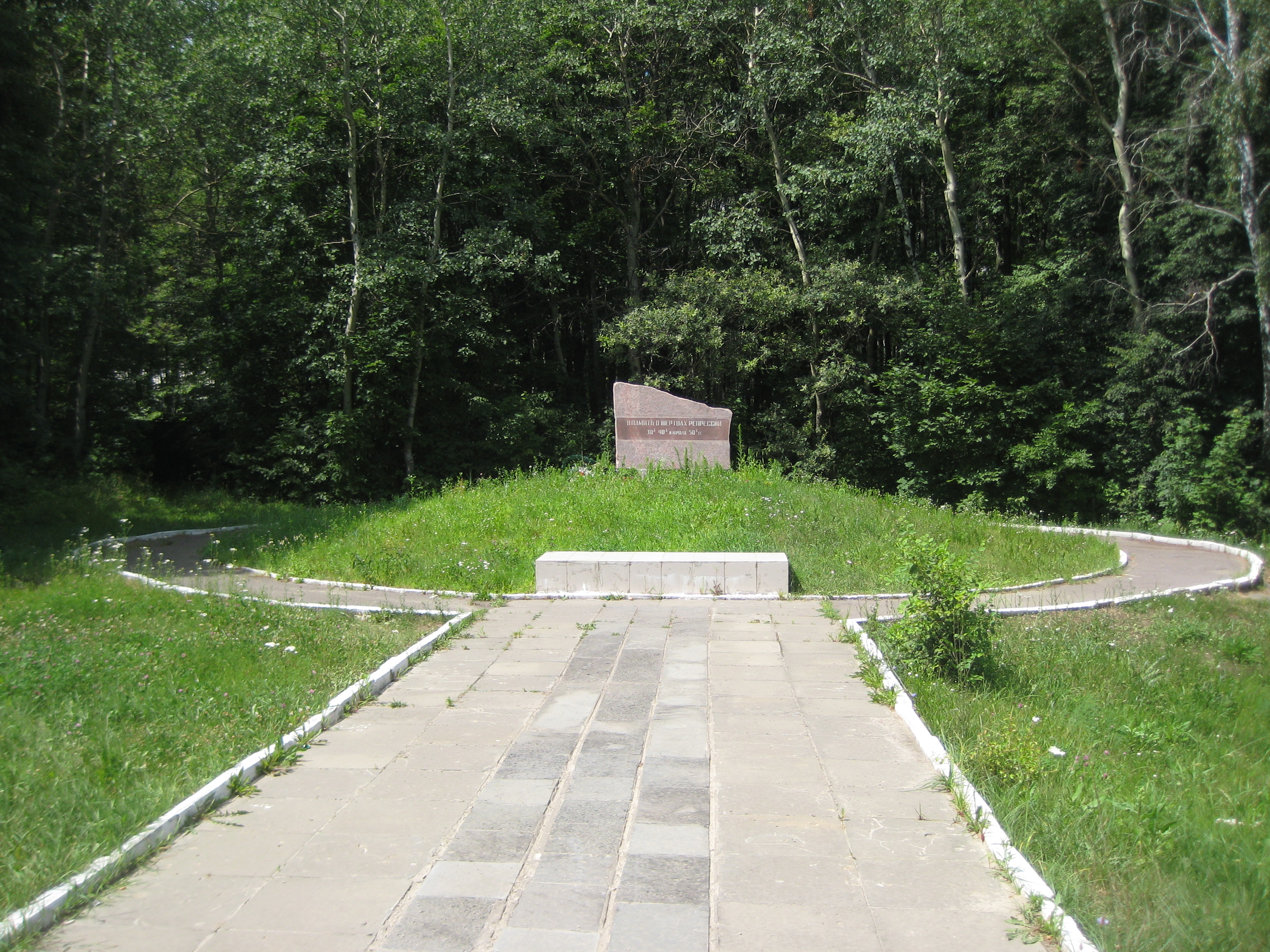
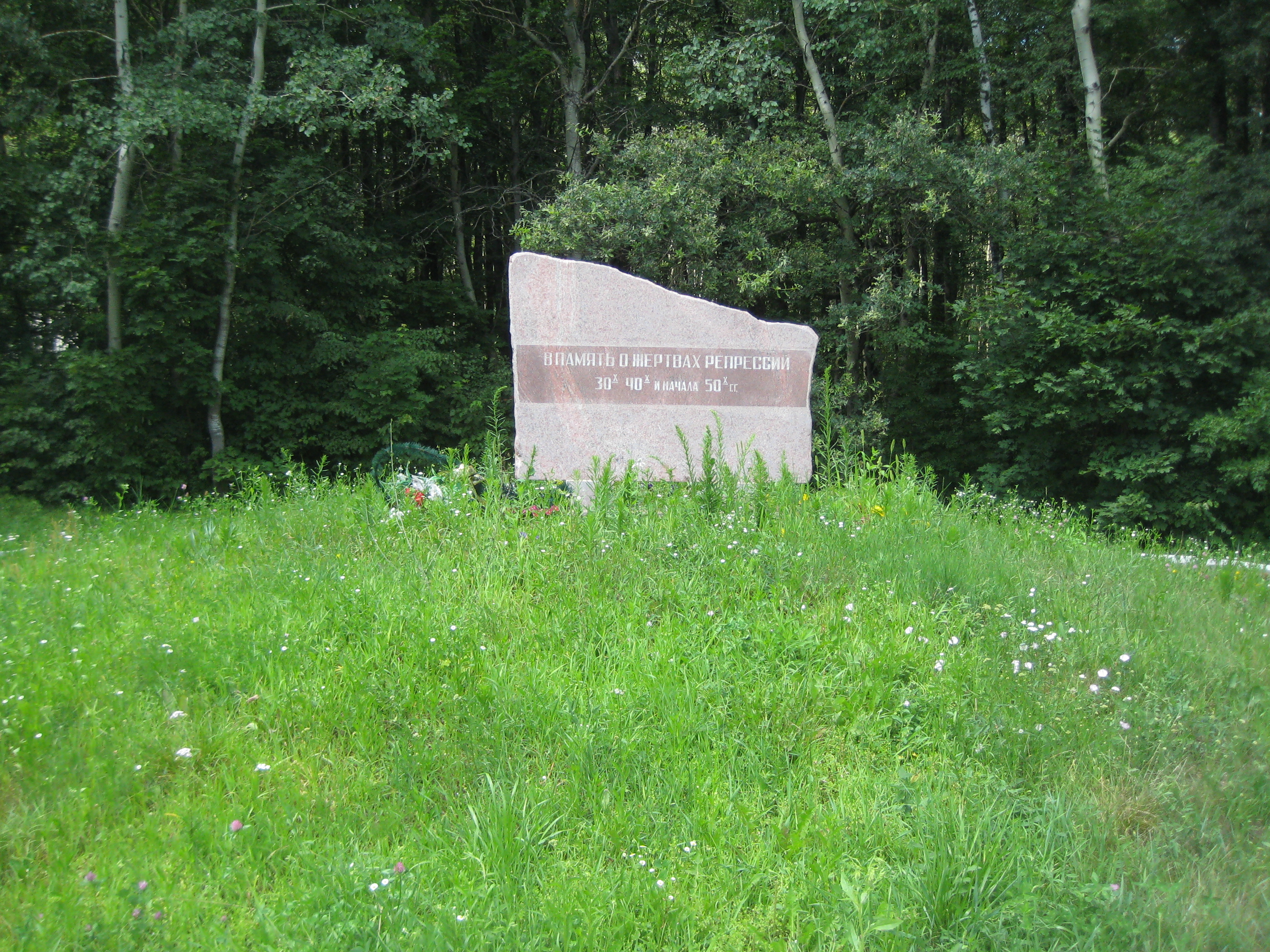
The inscription in Russian reads:
"In memory of the victims of the 1930s', 1940s' and early 1950s' repression"

The Medvedev Forest massacre (Russian: Медведевский расстрел) or Orel massacre (Орловский расстрел) was a mass execution in the Soviet Union carried out by the Soviet secret police NKVD on 11 September 1941. Less than three months after the German invasion of the Soviet Union, 157 political prisoners incarcerated at Oryol Prison were executed in Medvedev Forest, just outside the Russian city of Oryol, on the personal order of Joseph Stalin. This execution was one of the many massacres of prisoners hastily committed by the NKVD in 1941 in the wake of Nazi Germany's invasion.

In 1941, the Oryol Prison contained some five thousand political prisoners. On 5 September 1941, on the order of Lavrentiy Beria, the NKVD composed a list of 170 Oryol prisoners to be executed. Beria claimed they formed the "more angry part of the prisoners" and that they "performed defeatist agitation and attempted to organize escapes with the aim of renewing underground activities". The list was sent to Stalin, who approved it. On 8 September, judges Vasiliy Ulrikh (as chairman of the collegium), Dmitri Kandybin and Vasiliy Bukanov, without any litigation and without any kind of investigation, formally sentenced 161 persons to death. By the time of the execution, some in the list had already died or had been transferred while others had been released.

Many of those executed were foreign citizens, among them mathematician Fritz Noether, whose liberation Albert Einstein had demanded. Other detainees executed that day include Christian Rakovsky, Varvara Yakovleva, Maria Spiridonova, Olga Kameneva, Garegin Apresov, Dmitry Pletnyov and Sergei Efron.

The Medvedev Forest massacre came less than three months after Operation Barbarossa, and less than four weeks before the German Nazis invaded the city of Oryol. The Nazis occupied Oryol from 7 October 1941 until 5 August 1943. The Soviet Red Army liberated Oryol on 5 August 1943, during the Battle of Kursk.

== List of executed prisoners ==
Among the prisoners of the Oryol prison sentenced to execution were several prominent political figures. Christian Rakovsky, a Bulgarian by nationality, a former member of the Central Committee of the RCP(b) since 1918 and chairman of the Council of People's Commissars of the Ukrainian SSR, was sentenced to 20 years in prison in 1938 as part of the Third Moscow Trial as an "English and Japanese spy". Maria Spiridonova, a well-known revolutionary, one of the leaders of the Left Socialist Revolutionaries, who had withdrawn from political activity in the early 1920s, was also arrested and by the time of her execution had already been serving a sentence in Oryol for a long time on charges of preparing an assassination attempt on Kliment Voroshilov. Spiridonova's fate was shared by her husband, also a former Socialist Revolutionary, I. A. Mayorov, who served time in the same prison, but at the same time knew nothing about his wife's fate: the inquiries sent by Mayorov to various authorities were not answered. In the same cell with Mayorov were the former member of the Central Committee of the Socialist Revolutionary Party V. A. Chaikin, the Socialist Revolutionary Aleksandra Izmailovich and the professor of Roman law at Kyiv University V. V. Karpeko.

In addition to the prisoners listed above, the following were shot in the Medvedev Forest: V. V. Arnold, who was once accused of attempting to assassinate Vyacheslav Molotov, former engineer of Kuzbassugol M. S. Stroilov (he, along with Arnold, was accused of sabotage), former adviser to the USSR Plenipotentiary Mission in Germany S. A. Bessonov, famous physician and professor D. D. Pletnev, convicted of involvement in the murder of Maxim Gorky, “red professor” A. Yu. Aikhenwald, and responsible employee of the Comintern V. D. Kasparova.

The same fate befell the former People's Commissar of Finance, left communist Varvara Yakovleva. The relatives of several prominent figures were also killed, including the sister of Leon Trotsky and first wife of Lev Kamenev, Olga Kameneva, Olga Okudzhava (sister of previously repressed Bolsheviks Mikhail, Shalva and Nikolai Okudzhava, wife of the poet Galaktion Tabidze, aunt of Bulat Okudzhava) and the youngest son of Grigory Petrovsky, Pyotr, as well as the brother of Nikolai Yezhov, Sergei.

A significant part of the execution list consisted of Asian names: one of them was Ashurbek Khusravbekov (a native of the village of Pish, Darmorakht village council, Shugnan district, Tajik SSR, Tajik, citizen of the USSR); there were especially many Chinese among those sentenced.

Many of the convicted had citizenship/nationality of foreign countries or were of foreign origin. The latter included, in particular, the German mathematician Fritz Noether, for whose release Albert Einstein had petitioned the USSR authorities.
