= Vasily Blokhin =

Soviet Russian soldier and executioner (1895–1955)

- Василий Блохин
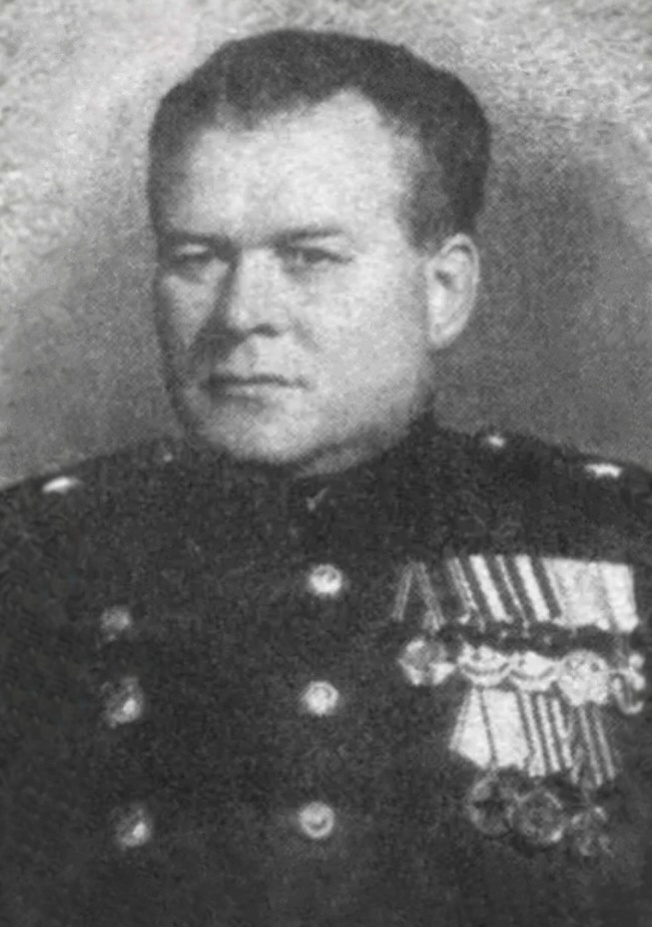
- Blokhin in 1950

Chief Executioner and Commander Kommandatura Branch Main Administrative-Economic Department, Moscow Oblast People's Commissariat for Internal Affairs (NKVD)
- In office 1926–1953

Personal details
- Born: Vasily Mikhailovich Blokhin; 19 January [O.S. 7 January] 1895 Gavrilovskoye, Vladimir Governorate, Russian Empire
- Died: 3 February 1955 (aged 60) Moscow, Russian SFSR, Soviet Union
- Party: Communist Party of the Soviet Union (1921–1953)
- Awards: Order of Lenin

Military service
- Allegiance: Russian Empire; Soviet Union
- Branch/service: Imperial Russian Army; Soviet Army
- Rank: Major general
- Battles/wars: World War I World War II

Vasily Mikhailovich Blokhin (Russian: Васи́лий Миха́йлович Блохи́н; 19 January [O.S. 7 January] 1895 – 3 February 1955) was a Soviet secret police official who served as the chief executioner of the NKVD under the administrations of Genrikh Yagoda, Nikolay Yezhov and Lavrentiy Beria.

Blokhin was selected for the position by Joseph Stalin in 1926 and led a company of executioners that performed and supervised numerous mass killings in the Soviet Union during Stalin's reign, mostly during the Great Purge and Eastern Front of World War II. Blokhin is recorded as having executed tens of thousands of prisoners by his own hand, including his killing of about 7,000 Polish prisoners of war during the Katyn massacre in spring 1940, making him the most prolific official executioner in recorded world history. Blokhin was forced into retirement in 1953 after the death of Stalin and condemned during de-Stalinization shortly before his death in 1955.

== Early life ==
Vasily Mikhailovich Blokhin was born on 7 January 1895 in Gavrilovskoye, Vladimir Governorate into a Russian peasant family. He worked as a shepherd in Yaroslavl Governorate from 1905 to 1910 before becoming a bricklayer in Moscow. Blokhin served in the Imperial Russian Army during World War I, rising to rank of a non-commissioned officer despite his young age. After the February Revolution, he was elected the chairman of the Army Committee for the 218th Infantry Regiment. He returned home to help his father before joining the Red Army in October 1918.

Blokhin was married to Natalia Aleksandrovna Blokhina (1901–1967), and had a son, Nikolai Vasilievich Baranov (1916–1998).

== Career ==
Blokhin joined the Russian Communist Party (Bolsheviks) and the Cheka (the Bolshevik security agency) in March 1921. He was soon appointed a platoon commander in the military wing of the Cheka and its successor agencies. Though records are scant, he was evidently noted for both his pugnacity and his mastery of what Joseph Stalin termed chernaya rabota ("wetwork", or literally, "black work"): assassinations, torture, intimidation, and executions conducted clandestinely. Once he gained Stalin's attention, Blokhin was quickly promoted and within six years was appointed the head of the purposefully created Kommandatura Branch of the Administrative Executive Department of the NKVD. This branch was a company-sized element created by Stalin specifically for wetwork. Headquartered at the Lubyanka in Moscow, its members were all approved by Stalin and took their orders directly from him, which ensured the unit's longevity despite three bloody purges of the NKVD.

Blokhin, as chief executioner of the NKVD, had the official title of commandant of the internal prison at the Lubyanka, which allowed him to carry out his duties with a minimum of scrutiny and no official paperwork. Although most of the estimated 828,000 NKVD executions conducted in Stalin's lifetime were performed by local agents in concert with NKVD troikas, mass executions were overseen by specialist executioners from the Kommandantura. In addition to overseeing the mass executions, Blokhin is reported to have personally pulled the trigger in all of the individual high-profile executions conducted in the Soviet Union during his tenure, including those of the Old Bolsheviks, such as Grigoriy Zinoviev, Lev Kamenev and Nikolai Bukharin, who were convicted at the Moscow Trials between 1936 and 1938; Marshal of the Soviet Union Mikhail Tukhachevsky, who was convicted in a secret trial in 1937; and the two NKVD directors condemned to death by Stalin in 1938 and 1940 respectively, Genrikh Yagoda and Nikolai Yezhov, both of whom he had once served under. Blokhin himself was spared by Stalin during the Great Purge due to a positive reference from the head of Stalin's personal security, Nikolai Vlasik, as well as his involvement in the NKVD's wetwork. He was awarded the Badge of Honour for his service in 1937.

=== Role in the Katyn massacre ===
Blokhin's most infamous act was the April 1940 execution by shooting of about 7,000 Polish prisoners interned in the prisoner of war camp in Ostashkov, located in the Tver (then Kalinin Oblast (region). The majority were military and police officers who had been captured following the Soviet invasion of Poland in 1939. The event's infamy stems in part from the Stalin regime's ordering of the murders, and the subsequent Allied propaganda campaign which blamed Nazi Germany for the massacres in order to preserve cohesion between the USSR and other allied nations.

In 1990, Mikhail Gorbachev gave the Polish government the files on the massacres at Katyn, Starobilsk and Kalinin (now Tver) as part of Glasnost, revealing Stalin's involvement. Based on the 4 April secret order from Stalin to NKVD Chief Lavrentiy Beria as well as NKVD Order No. 00485, which still applied, the executions were carried out over 28 consecutive nights at the specially constructed basement execution chamber at the NKVD headquarters in Kalinin, and were assigned, by name, directly to Blokhin, making him the official executioner of the NKVD.

Blokhin initially decided on an ambitious quota of 300 executions per night, and engineered an efficient system in which the prisoners were individually led to a small antechamber — which had been painted red and was known as the "Leninist room" — for a brief and cursory positive identification, before being handcuffed and led into the execution room next door. The room was specially designed with padded walls for soundproofing, a sloping concrete floor with a drain and hose, and a log wall for the prisoners to stand against. Blokhin would stand waiting behind the door in his executioner garb: a leather butcher's apron, leather hat, and shoulder-length leather gloves. Then, without a hearing, the reading of a sentence or any other formalities, each prisoner was brought in and restrained by guards while Blokhin shot him once in the base of the skull with a German Walther Model 2 .25 ACP pistol. He had brought a briefcase full of his own Walther pistols, since he did not trust the reliability of the standard-issue Soviet TT-30 for the frequent, heavy use he intended. The use of a German pocket pistol, which was commonly carried by German police and intelligence agents, also provided plausible deniability of the executions if the bodies were discovered later.

An estimated 30 local NKVD agents, guards and drivers were pressed into service to escort prisoners to the basement, confirm identification, then remove the bodies and hose down the blood after each execution. Although some of the executions were carried out by Senior Lieutenant of State Security Andrei Rubanov, Blokhin was the primary executioner and, true to his reputation, liked to work continuously and rapidly without interruption. In keeping with NKVD policy and the overall "wet" nature of the operation, the executions were conducted at night, starting at dark and continuing until just prior to dawn. The bodies were continuously loaded onto covered flat-bed trucks through a back door in the execution chamber and trucked, twice a night, to the nearby village of Mednoye. Blokhin had arranged for a bulldozer and two NKVD drivers to dispose of bodies at an unfenced site. Each night, 24–25 trenches were dug, measuring 8 to 10 metres (26 to 33 ft) in length, to hold that night's corpses, and each trench was covered over before dawn.

Blokhin and his team worked without pause for 10 hours each night, with Blokhin himself executing an average of one prisoner every three minutes. At the end of the night, he provided vodka to all his men. On 27 April 1940, Blokhin secretly received the Order of the Red Banner and a modest monthly pay premium as a reward from Stalin for his "skill and organization in the effective carrying out of special tasks". His tally of 7,000 shot in 28 days remains the most organised and protracted mass murder by a single individual on record, and caused him being named the Guinness World Record holder for "Most Prolific Executioner" in 2010.

== Death ==
Blokhin was forcibly retired from the NKVD following the death of Stalin in March 1953, officially due to poor health. He was one of the many Stalinist figures removed from power by the new leadership, but his "irreproachable service" was publicly noted by Beria at the time of his departure. In November 1954, Blokhin's rank of major general was stripped from him in the de-Stalinization campaigns of Nikita Khrushchev, who deemed him unworthy of carrying the rank of a general due to his involvement in the mass executions. Blokhin, already an alcoholic and mentally unstable, died on 3 February 1955 at the age of 60. The official cause of death was listed as suicide; however, his personnel files recorded that he died due to a heart attack.

== Honours and awards ==
- Honorary Worker of the Cheka-GPU (V) No. 498
- Honorary Worker of the Cheka-GPU (XV) (1932)
- Order of the Red Star (1936)
- Order of the Badge of Honour (1937)
- Order of the Red Banner, twice (1940, 1944)
- Order of the Red Banner of Labour (1943)
- Order of Lenin (1945)
- Order of the Patriotic War, 1st class (1945)

== See also ==
- Mass killings under communist regimes
