= All-Russian Conference of the Soviets =

The All-Russian Conference of Soviets (Russian: Всероссийская конференция Советов) was the first all-Russian meeting of representatives of the Soviets of Workers' and Soldiers' Deputies after the February Revolution of 1917. It took place on April 11–16, 1917. The meeting was attended by 480 delegates from 139 Soviets, 13 rear military units, 7 active armies and 26 separate units of the front.

The meeting was opened by the Chairman of the Petrograd Council, the Menshevik Nikolay Chkheidze, the presidium was elected as part of Nikolai Chkheidze, Matvey Skobelev, Irakli Tsereteli, Matvey Muranov, Lev Khinchuk, Victor Nogin, Boris Bogdanov, Mikhail Romm, Abram Gotz, Ivan Shavodorov, Ivan Theodorovich, Alexander Shlyapnikov, Vladimir Zavadie.

The meeting was the first significant step in formalizing the Soviets spontaneously arising during the February Revolution into a single all-Russian system. It determined the principles for organizing local councils.

Based on the results of its work, the Conference elected a new composition of the executive committee of the Petrograd Soviet, which became the highest Soviet authority until the convocation of the First All-Russian Congress of Soviets of Workers' and Soldiers' Deputies, which elected the All-Russian Central Executive Committee of the Soviets of Workers' and Soldiers' Deputies. Also, the Conference elected an Organizational Bureau to convene the First Congress itself.

The composition of the participants in the Conference was dominated by the Socialist Revolutionaries and Mensheviks. In their resolution, delegates endorsed the course towards continued participation of Russia in the World War ("defense"), supporting the Provisional Government's policy on this subject, subject to "abandoning captive aspirations". At the same time, in the resolution "On the War" it was noted that the Soviets "call on all peoples of both the allied and warring countries to exert pressure on their governments to abandon the conquest programs".

On the land issue, the Meeting declared support at a future Constituent Assembly for the project of transferring privately owned land to peasants "with the exception of possessions not exceeding maximum standards", however, prior to the convening of the Meeting, delegates refused to further discuss the issue of land ("non-commitment") and condemned its spontaneous seizures. On a working matter, the Meeting recognized the need to introduce an eight-hour working day, but refused to support the workers in setting such a day in an explicit manner.

In the resolution on the economic situation of the country, delegates called on the Provisional Government:

...to solve two urgent tasks: 1) systematically regulate the entire economic life of the country, organizing all production, exchange, movement and consumption under the direct control of the state; 2) to alienate [from the word "alienation"] all superprofits in favor of nations and limit all types of capitalist income to strictly defined norms. The working class must be provided with decent living and working conditions.

The Bolshevik faction in the Conference was represented by Lev Kamenev. On April 12, Kamenev, on behalf of the Bolsheviks, proposed a resolution to end the war, but it collected only 57 votes in favor with 325 against. On April 15, Kamenev called on the moderate Socialists who supported the Provisional Government to heed the recommendation of Georgy Plekhanov and enter this government themselves.

On the last day of the Conference, April 16, Vladimir Lenin arrived from exile in Petrograd, April 17, at a meeting of Bolsheviks – delegates of the Conference announced his "April Theses".
