= Third All-Russian Congress of Workers', Soldiers' and Peasants Deputies' Soviets =

Third All-Russian Congress of Workers' and Soldiers' Deputies' Soviets
←	Second Congress	Fourth Congress	→
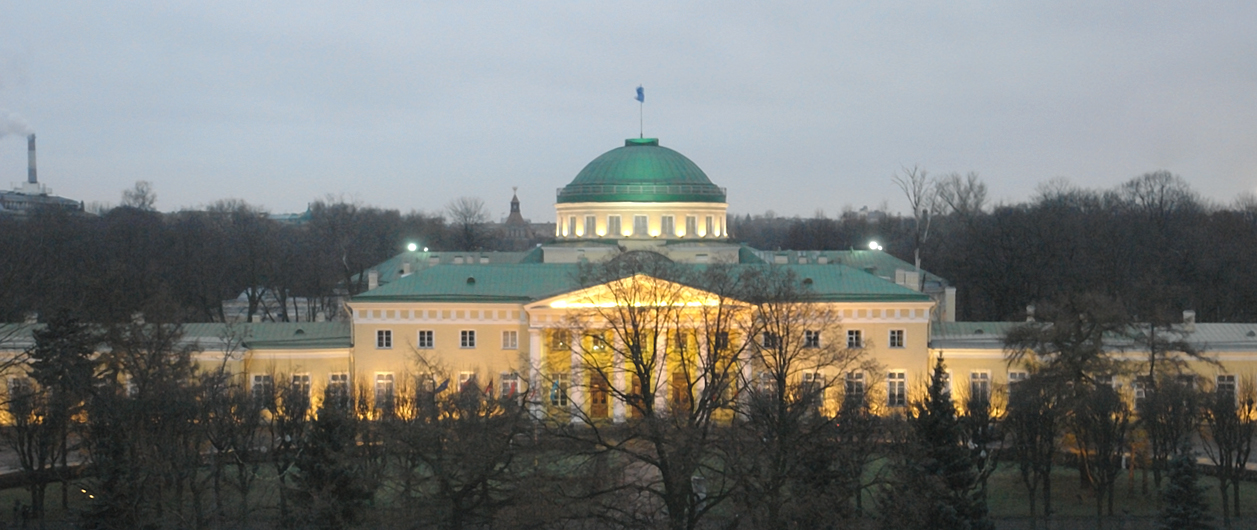
- Tauride Palace

Overview
- Legislative body: All-Russian Congress of Soviets
- Meeting place: Tauride Palace, Petrograd
- Term: 23 January 1918 [O.S. 10 January 1918] – 31 January 1918 [O.S. 18 January 1918]
- Party control: Russian Social Democratic Labor Party (Bolsheviks)

The Third All-Russian Congress of Workers' and Soldiers' Deputies' Soviets (also called the Third All-Russian Congress of Soviets or the Third All-Russian Congress of Workers', Soldiers' and Peasants Deputies' Soviets) took place on 23-31 January 1918 [O.S. 10-18 January 1918] in Tauride Palace, Petrograd. It was the successor to the Second All-Russian Congress of Workers' and Soldiers' Deputies' Soviets.

== Third All-Russia Congress of Soviets of Peasants’ Deputies ==
The Congress started out bringing together only Workers' and Soldiers' Deputies. However Third All-Russia Congress of Soviets of Peasants’ Deputies took place on 26 January 1918 [O.S. 13 January 1918] at the Smolny Institute, also in Petrograd. The Socialist Revolutionary Party (SRs) wanted to keep the Peasants' Congress separate from that of the Workers’ and Soldiers’. However, during the first session, the Bolshevik, Yakov Sverdlov, the Chairman of the All-Russian Central Executive Committee proposed a motion for the Congress to merge with that of the Third All-Russian Congress of Soviets of Workers’ and Soldiers’ Deputies. Despite opposition from the SRs and the Mensheviks, the motion was passed with the support Bolsheviks and the Left Socialist Revolutionaries, thereby transforming the two congresses into the Third All-Russian Congress of Workers', Soldiers' and Peasants Deputies' Soviets. Thus a single supreme organ of the Soviet power was created. As the congress continued the number of those attending grew from 942 voting delegates with a further 104 participating in an advisory capacity to over 1,500

Lenin described the Congress as having "opened a new epoch in world History” and that by establishing the organisation of a new state power created by the October Revolution it had "projected the lines of future socialist construction for the whole world, for the working people of all countries”.

== Agenda of the Congress ==
Occurring shortly after the Constituent Assembly had been dissolved by order of the All-Russian Central Executive Committee (VTsIK), the Congress resolved to expunge any references to the forthcoming Constituent Assembly from all new editions of decrees and laws of the Soviet Government, becoming thus the supreme body of national power and authority in Russia, with the VTsiK assuming its duties in between the sessions of the Congress.

The Congress received:

- Yakov Sverdlov's report on the activity of the All-Russian Central Executive Committee.
- Vladimir Lenin's report on the activity of the Council of People's Commissars.
- Joseph Stalin's report from the People's Commissariat of Nationalities on the principles of federation and the nationalities' policy for the emerging Soviet state. The nationalities policy proposed was approved by the Congress.

== Resolutions ==
The Declaration of Rights of the Working and Exploited People, which was proposed before the opening of the Congress, was passed and this went on to become the basis of the Soviet Constitution. It was also agreed to establish the Russian Soviet Republic on the basis of a free union of the peoples of Russia.

The Congress also approved the Decree on Land which provided the basic provisions of the redistribution and nationalization of land.

The Mensheviks, Right Socialist-Revolutionaries and the Menshevik-Internationalists used the Congress to indicate their opposition to the domestic and foreign policy which the Bolsheviks passed.
