= Bolshevization of the soviets =

1917 process whereby the Bolsheviks gained majority in revolutionary councils

The Bolshevization of the soviets was the process of winning a majority in the soviets by the Russian Social Democratic Labor Party (Bolsheviks) in the second half of 1917. The process was particularly active after the Kornilov Rebellion during September – October 1917 and was accompanied by the ousting from these bodies of power previously moderate socialists, primarily the Socialist Revolutionaries and Mensheviks, who dominated them.

In the course of these processes, by the beginning of the October Revolution, the Bolsheviks were gaining a majority, primarily in the Soviets of Workers' and Soldiers' Deputies of large industrial cities, gaining up to 90% of the seats in the Petrograd Soviet and up to 60% in Moscow. On September 17, 1917, the Bolshevik Viktor Nogin became Chairman of the Presidium of the Moscow Soviet; on September 25, the Petrograd Soviet was headed by Leon Trotsky. Relying on their firm majority in the Petrograd Soviet, the Bolsheviks were able, despite the opposition of the All-Russian Central Executive Committee, to convene the Second All-Russian Congress of Soviets of Workers' and Soldiers' Deputies and prepare for the October Armed Uprising.

== Background ==
Movement of the Provisional Government to the left
Date	Number of socialist ministers
First composition (March 2, 1917)	1 out of 11 (Socialist Revolutionary Kerensky)
Second composition (following the results of the April crisis)	6 out of 16
Third composition (following the results of the July crisis)	7 out of 16, the Chairmanship of Kerensky
Fourth composition (September–October)	7 out of 16

By October (November) 1917, the Provisional Government's inability to cope with growing anarchy became apparent. The army of a warring country was rapidly falling apart; in February – November 1917, up to 1,5 million people deserted. The food apportionment policy has failed; bread rations in Petrograd and Moscow have been reduced to 0.5 pounds per person per day. The strike movement in the cities and the seizure of landlord lands in villages increased sharply. The process of separating national peripheries had begun to spiral out of control.

Criticism was also caused by the unwillingness of the Provisional Government to convene a Constituent Assembly. Richard Pipes draws attention to the fact that, for example, in 1848 after the fall of the July monarchy in France, the Constituent Assembly was convened two months later, in 1918 after the November Revolution in Germany – four months after the establishment of the new government. The Provisional Government had not convened a Constituent Assembly for its entire existence. Even the Menshevik newspaper Svobodnaya Zhizn stated that the convocation of the Assembly was postponed by the government for "a terribly long time, which no European revolution knew".

The collapse of the economy continued. By the fall of 1917, the real incomes of factory workers reached 40% of the pre-war ones; a "black market" of food appeared in the cities, the prices of which were three times higher than "hard prices". Massive plant closures and food shortages led to an increase in the strike movement; compared with the spring of 1917, the number of strikers increased 7–8 times, and reached 2,4 million people.

On October 14, 1917, the Socialist Revolutionary newspaper Delo Naroda declared to the government that "finally, the masses must be made to feel the tangible results of the revolution, for seven months of revolutionary sterility led to ruin, anarchy, and hunger". Leon Trotsky, at a meeting of the Petrograd Soviet on October 16, 1917, noted that "a laborer who came from the village and stood idle for hours in the "tails" [lines] is naturally imbued with hatred for those who are better dressed and richer, because the rich man gets all the products without cards, paying twice. His hatred then spreads to those who are more educated than him; whoever believes otherwise than he, etc. We understand these laborers and treat them differently than the bourgeois bastard who wants to shoot them".

== Radicalization of public opinion ==
Richard Pipes in his work "The Bolsheviks in the Struggle for Power" draws attention to the general radicalization of Russian public opinion that occurred in August – October 1917. Society increasingly rejected moderate alternatives, tending to support either the right-wing Kornilovites (the "military dictatorship") or the radical socialists (Bolsheviks). The moderate liberal Constitutional Democratic Party in the summer of 1917 showed a drift "to the right", supporting the Kornilov Uprising ("Kornilov Rebellion"). The Menshevik Party lost popularity, partly due to its wide participation in the Provisional Government, and gained only 2–3% of the vote in the Constituent Assembly elections.

On the whole, by the middle of 1917 there was a strong roll of society to the left: the size of the Socialist Revolutionary Party increased to 700–800 thousand people, the Bolsheviks 350 thousand, the Mensheviks 150–200 thousand. At the same time, the number of the Constitutional Democratic Party is only 70–80 thousand people. The Soviets at all levels from the moment they were formed during the February Revolution are 100% leftist; in addition, during 1917 there was a strong movement to the left of the Provisional Government due to the increase in the number of "socialist ministers". According to the results of the elections to the Constituent Assembly, the majority also turned out to be left.

== Demarche of the Bolsheviks in the Pre-Parliament ==
On October 3, 1917, the All-Russian Democratic Conference formed a new representative body, the Pre-Parliament, in which the Bolsheviks received only 58 seats out of 555. The attitude of radical socialists towards this body was negative, since representatives of the "qualifying bourgeoisie" ("qualifying elements") had a significant influence in it. Lenin stated that "the sole purpose of [the Pre-Parliament] is to distract the workers and peasants from the growing revolution" and on October 12, 1917, called the decision of the Bolsheviks to participate in his work "shameful" and "a blatant mistake". According to Trotsky, the Mensheviks and Socialist Revolutionaries by the establishment of the Pre-Parliament intended "to painlessly transfer Soviet legality into bourgeois-parliamentary legality". At the same time, a number of Bolsheviks, primarily Kamenev and Ryazanov, opposed the boycott of the Pre-Parliament. According to Trotsky's recollections, "[at a meeting of the Bolshevik faction in the Pre-Parliament] I held a boycottist point of view of non-entry [into the Pre-Parliament], and Rykov – the point of entry. Only after that we received a letter from Lenin from Finland, where he supported the boycottist point of view of the faction... after that, the meeting of the Central Committee had the character of an attempt to put the last points over i, to bring full certainty into the situation. There was great uncertainty in the behavior of party cells, in regiments, in the behavior of commissars".

On October 20, 1917, the head of the Bolshevik faction in the Pre-Parliament, Trotsky announced the Bolsheviks' final refusal to continue to participate in the work of this body, stating that "...a power has been created in and around which the explicit and secret Kornilovites play a leading role... the amount to which, as all elections in the country show, they have no right... With this government of high treason... we have nothing in common... long live the immediate, honest democratic world, all power to the Soviets, all the land to the people, long live the Constituent Assembly!".

== Bolshevization ==
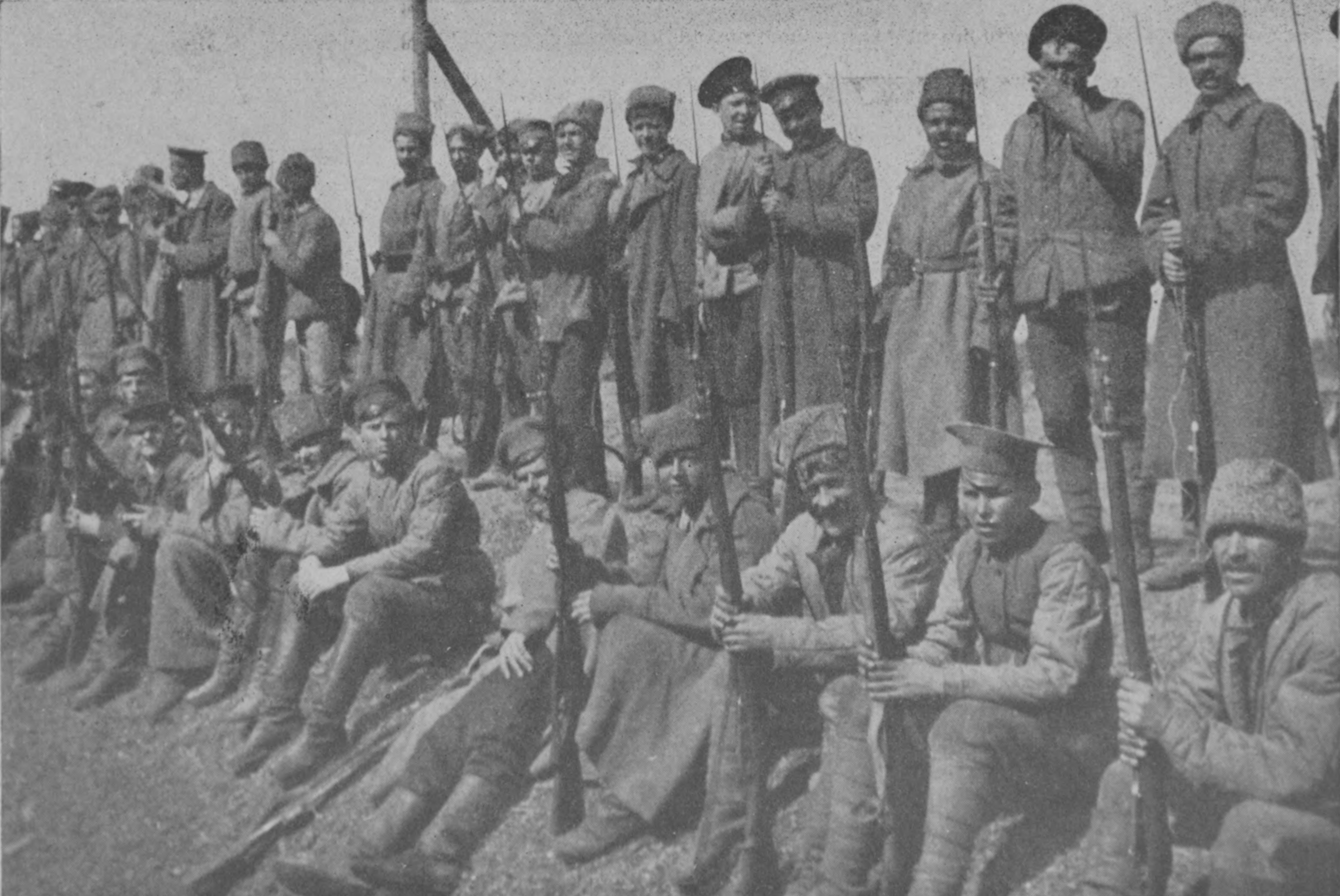
Red Guards in 1917

Against this background, in August – October 1917, an active "Bolshevization of the Soviets" took place. By the beginning of November 1917, the Bolsheviks occupied up to 90% of the seats in the Petrograd Soviet, up to 60% in the Moscow Soviet, most of the seats in 80 local Soviets of large industrial cities. In the executive committee of the Working Section of the Moscow Soviet of Workers' and Soldiers' Deputies during the elections of September 18–19, 1917, the Bolsheviks get 32 seats, the Mensheviks – 16, the Socialist Revolutionaries – 9, the United – 3, the Bolsheviks won the election of 11 out of 17 district councils. At the same time, the Socialist Revolutionaries continue to prevail in the executive committee of the Soldier Section of the Soviet.

On September 17, 1917, the Bolshevik Viktor Nogin became Chairman of the Presidium of the Moscow Soviet; on September 25, 1917, the Petrograd Soviet was headed by Leon Trotsky, who was already Chairman of the Petrograd Soviet in 1905. On the side of the Bolsheviks are Soldiers' Committees, primarily of the Northern and Western Fronts, the Petrograd Garrison and the Central Committee of the Baltic Fleet. At the Second Congress of Deputies of the Baltic Fleet, a resolution was adopted that the fleet "does not obey the government", the Bolshevik – Left Socialist Revolutionary Central Committee of the Baltic Fleet was elected.

The "Bolshevization" of the Soldier's Committees goes from below and reaches the regimental level Committees. At the same time, Army Committees until November 1917 remained a Socialist Revolutionary – Menshevik. One of the immediate tasks of the Bolsheviks is the organization of a massive re-election of Army Committees in order to include their supporters.

Having received up to 90% of the seats in the Petrograd Soviet, the Bolsheviks begin active work to conquer the upcoming Second All-Russian Congress of Soviets, and, accordingly, its permanent body – the All-Russian Central Executive Committee. In anticipation of the Second Congress, the Bolshevik Petrograd Soviet is organizing a regional Congress, the First Congress of Soviets of the Northern Region, in which Petrograd was included, as well as representatives of the Baltic Fleet. The congress was held on October 24–26, 1917 in Petrograd, and was characterized by a sharp predominance of radical socialists: out of 94 delegates to the congress, there were 51 Bolsheviks and 24 Left Socialist Revolutionaries.

Lenin, "immediately providing" land to the peasants and preaching the seizure, in fact subscribed to anarchist tactics and the Socialist Revolutionary program. Both were kindly and understandable to a peasant who was by no means a fanatical supporter of Marxism. But both, for at least 15 years, the Marxist Lenin incessantly scolded. Now it has been cast. For the sake of courtesy and comprehensibility to the peasant, Lenin became both an anarchist and a Socialist Revolutionary.

Trotsky, on the other hand, so resolved all food difficulties in one spirit, that the sky grew hot... The Soviet government will send a soldier, sailor and workwoman to each village (Trotsky for some reason said precisely a workwoman at dozens of rallies); they will examine the wealthy's reserves, leave them what they need, and the rest for free – to the city or to the front... The Petersburg working mass enthusiastically greeted these promises and prospects.

It is clear that all "confiscation" and all "free", scattered right and left with royal generosity, were captivating and irresistible in the mouth of friends of the people. Nothing could resist it. And this was the source of the spontaneous and uncontrollable development of this method of agitation... Rich and poor; the rich have a lot, the poor have nothing; everything will belong to the poor, everything will be divided among the poor. This is told to you by your own workers' party, followed by the millions of poor people in cities and villages, the only party that fights with the rich and their government for land, peace and bread.

All this has been pouring endless waves all over Russia in recent weeks... All this was heard daily by hundreds of thousands of hungry, tired and embittered... This was an integral element of Bolshevik agitation, although it was not their official program.

But a delicate question arises: was socialism in this "platform"? Did I miss socialism? Have I noticed an elephant?..

The movement of the masses clearly overflowed. The working districts of Petersburg were in full swing in front of everyone. They listened only to the Bolsheviks and only believed in them. At the famous circus "Modern", where Trotsky, Lunacharsky, Volodarsky performed, everyone saw the endless tails and crowds of people who could no longer accommodate the crowded huge circus. Agitators called from words to action and promised a very close conquest of Soviet power. And finally, in Smolny they worked on creating a new, more than suspicious "defense" body...

— Nikolay Sukhanov. Notes on the Revolution

The Socialist Revolutionary – Menshevik All-Russian Central Executive Committee refused to recognize the legitimacy of this congress, accusing the Bolsheviks of violating election procedures. According to Richard Pipes, invitations to send delegates to the congress were sent from the unrecognized Regional Committee of the Army, Navy and Workers of Finland to only the Soviets where the Bolsheviks had a majority, and such invitations were sent even to the Moscow Province, which was not part of the Northern Region. On the other hand, the leadership of the Russian Social Democratic Labor Party (Bolsheviks), primarily Lenin personally, considered the possibility of declaring the Congress of the Northern Region the highest authority. On October 8, Lenin wrote "A Letter to the Comrades of the Bolsheviks Participating in the Regional Congress of Soviets of the Northern Region", in which he directly calls for an uprising. In his speech at the Congress, the Bolshevik Grigory Sokolnikov also called for an uprising, and stated that "holding a Congress in Petrograd is not accidental, since it might be he who will begin the uprising", but after the Congress the delegates adopted a resolution stating that the question of power should be decided by the Second All-Russian Congress of Soviets.

At the Congress of Soviets of the Northern Region, the Northern Regional Committee is elected consisting of 11 Bolsheviks and 6 Left Socialist Revolutionaries, which launched a vigorous activity in preparation for the Second All-Russian Congress. On October 16, telegrams were sent to local councils on behalf of the radical-controlled Petrograd Soviet, the Moscow Council and the Congress of Soviets of the Northern Region with a proposal to send delegates to the Congress by October 20. This activity took place against the backdrop of the unwillingness of the Mensheviks and right-wing Socialist Revolutionaries to convene the Congress in general, as in fact predetermining the will of the Constituent Assembly on the issue of power in the country. Especially strong was the opposition of the Right Socialist Revolutionary permanent bodies of the First All-Russian Congress of Soviets of Peasant Deputies; so, on October 12, the All-Russian Central Executive Committee of this Congress declared the convocation "a criminal undertaking, disastrous for the Motherland and the Revolution", and on October 24 sent telegrams to the peasant Soviets demanding "not to take part" in the Congress. Richard Pipes also points out that the initiative of the regional Congress of Soviets to convene the Second All-Russian Congress of Soviets was itself illegal. According to the procedures existing at that time, only the All-Russian Central Executive Committee, the permanent body of the previous Congress, had the right to convene a new All-Russian Congress of Soviets, however, the All-Russian Central Executive Committee was Socialist Revolutionary – Menshevik in composition and did not intend to convene a new Congress.

At the same time, at the beginning of October, out of 974 Soviets of Workers' and Soldiers' Deputies operating in the country, 600 were in favor of dispersing the Provisional Government and destroying the "dual power" system. At the same time, it was not possible to achieve the Bolshevization of the Soviets of Peasant Deputies; out of 455 such Soviets in 264 there were no Bolshevik factions at all.

The success of the Bolsheviks in the elections to the traditional bodies of self-government was also modest: in the capital Petrograd City Duma, the Bolshevik faction won 33.5% of the vote, in Moscow 11.6%, in the provincial cities of 7.5%, in the county 2.2%. At the same time, the Socialist Revolutionaries receive 37.5% in the Petrograd City Duma, and about 50% in 50 provincial cities.

In October, Lenin safely returned to Petrograd. As early as September 15, he began to actively persuade his supporters to begin preparations for a new uprising (the letters "The Bolsheviks Must Take Power" and "Marxism and the Uprising"), without waiting for Kerensky to surrender Petrograd to the Germans or still assemble the Constituent Assembly (whose elections after a long delay was finally appointed by the Provisional Government on November 12). Trotsky calls Lenin's proposals to raise an insurrection immediately "too impulsive" and suggests postponing it until the Second All-Russian Congress of Soviets is convened. Kamenev suggests not raising an uprising, "burning" Lenin's letters.

In a letter, "Marxism and Rebellion", Lenin states that

...one of the most malicious and perhaps the most widespread perversions of Marxism ... belongs to the opportunist lie that preparing a rebellion, generally treating an uprising as an art, is "Blanquism". ...rebellion, in order to be successful, should not be based on a conspiracy, not on the party, but on the vanguard class ... on the revolutionary upsurge of the people ... on such a turning point in the history of the growing revolution, when the activity of the vanguard ranks of the people is greatest, when the fluctuations in the ranks of enemies and in the ranks of weak half-hearted indecisive friends is strongest... On July 3–4 ... there were no conditions for the victory of the uprising then ... there were still no majority among the workers and soldiers of the capitals. Now it is in both Soviets ... there was no nationwide revolutionary upsurge then. Now it is after Kornilovism. ...there was no hesitation then, on a serious general political scale, among our enemies and among the half-petty bourgeoisie. Now the vibrations are gigantic...

The Socialist Revolutionary – Menshevik All-Russian Central Executive Committee accuses the Bolsheviks of fraud in organizing the elections of the Second Congress; in violation of electoral procedures, the Bolsheviks organized the election of soldier delegates not from the Socialist Revolutionary and Menshevik Soldiers' Committees at the army level, but from pro-Bolshevik-oriented Soldiers' Committees at the level of regiments, divisions and corps, and the Bolsheviks launched activities to re-elect Army Committees. In addition, the Bolsheviks took full advantage of the chaos and disproportionate representation that existed then in the system of Soviets, artificially increasing the number of delegates from those Soviets where they had a majority. As a result, for example, 10% of the Congress delegates were Latvians, which did not correspond to their share in the population. The peasant majority of the country's population, who supported primarily the Socialist Revolutionaries, were not represented at the Congress; the Second All-Russian Congress of Peasant Deputies was held, like the First Congress, separately from the Congress of Workers' and Soldiers' Deputies.

Having declared the Second Congress of Soviets illegal in advance, the All-Russian Central Executive Committee, however, agreed to convene it, postponing only the opening date of the Congress from October 20 to October 25, and stating that the Congress "should work no more than three days". Lenin continues to persuade the Bolsheviks to start an uprising immediately, without waiting for the Congress, and calls the supporters of its transfer "October 25 fetishists".

== See also ==
- Bykhov Imprisonment
- Political parties of Russia in 1917
- Russian Revolution
