= Second All-Russian Congress of Soviets of Workers' and Soldiers' Deputies =

1917 meeting in Smolny, Petrograd

←	First Congress	Third Congress	→
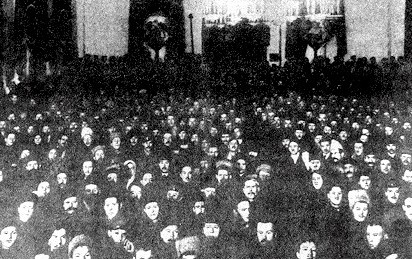
- Session of the Second All-Russian Congress of Soviets in Smolny. November 7, 1917

Overview
- Legislative body: All-Russian Congress of Soviets
- Meeting place: Assembly Hall, Smolny, Petrograd
- Term: 7 November 1917 [O.S. 25 October 1917] – 9 November 1917 [O.S. 27 October 1917]
- Party control: Russian Social Democratic Labor Party (Bolsheviks)

The Second All-Russian Congress of Soviets of Workers' and Soldiers' Deputies was held on November 7–9, 1917, in Smolny, Petrograd. It was convened under the pressure of the Bolsheviks on the All-Russian Central Executive Committee of the First Congress of Soviets of Workers' and Soldiers' Deputies.

== Background ==
During the autumn of 1917, the Russian Social Democratic Labor Party (Bolsheviks) launched an activity to win a majority in the Soviets, primarily in Petrograd and Moscow.

On September 17, Bolshevik Viktor Nogin was elected Chairman of the Moscow Council Presidium; on September 20, Lev Trotsky was elected Chairman of the Petrograd Council. The Bolsheviks occupy up to 90% of the seats in the Petrograd Soviet and up to 60% in the Moscow Soviet.

As early as the end of September 1917, the Bolsheviks set a course for the conquest of the majority in the All-Russian Soviet organs, for which it was necessary to obtain a majority at the corresponding congresses of the soviets.

The decision to hold the Second All-Russian Congress of Soviets of Workers' and Soldiers' Deputies in September was made by the First Congress, but the All-Russian Central Executive Committee sabotaged its meeting, not wanting to yield power to the strengthened Bolsheviks. At the end of September, the executive committee of the Bolshevik Petrograd Soviet sent to 69 local Soviets and army soldiers' committees a request their attitude towards the convocation of the Second Congress. This idea was met with hostility by the Socialist Revolutionaries and Mensheviks. Of the 69 organs requested, only 8 responded positively. The reaction of the Socialist Revolutionary-Menshevik army committees, which recognized the convocation of the Congress "untimely", was particularly harsh.

The Bolshevization of the Soviets took place against the background of an aggravated political and military situation: the Provisional Government, after long delays, finally called elections to the Constituent Assembly for November 12, and its first meeting – for November 28.

The situation at the front during this period also deteriorated greatly: on October 16, an order was issued for the evacuation of Revel, on October 21, the Germans captured the Moonsund Islands, threatening Petrograd directly.

The General Rehearsal of the Second Congress for the Bolsheviks was the First Congress of the Soviets of the Northern Region organized by them in October, the lion's share of whose delegates were representatives of Petrograd and the Baltic Fleet, which were significantly Bolshevik by that time. As Richard Pipes claimed, this Congress was convened with a number of violations by the unrecognized Regional Committee of the Army, Navy and Workers of Finland. Among the delegates were even representatives of the Moscow province, not included in the Northern region. The Bolsheviks and the Left Social Revolutionaries sharply prevailed in the Congress. Following its results, the Bolshevik-Left Socialist Revolutionary Northern Regional Committee was elected, starting from October 16, began work on the convocation of the Second Congress.

All this activity of the Bolsheviks was in no way coordinated with the old Soviet bodies, the majority of which remained Socialist Revolutionary-Menshevik (the All-Russian Central Executive Committee of the First Congress of the Soviets of Workers' and Soldiers' Deputies, the All-Russian Central Executive Committee of the First Congress of Soviets of Peasant Deputies, army committees, the Central Executive Committee of the Navy).

On October 19, the official Soviet newspaper Izvestia noted that

No other committee [except the All-Russian Central Executive Committee] is authorized and does not have the right to take the initiative to convene a congress. Nevertheless, the Northern Regional Congress, convened in violation of all the rules established for regional conventions and representing random and randomly chosen Councils, has the right to do so.

Nevertheless, the All-Russian Central Executive Committee agreed to convene a Congress, having achieved only its postponement from October 20 to October 25.

Preparation of the Congress was the reason for the differences between Lenin and Trotsky. While Lenin demanded to start an armed uprising, not waiting for the Congress, Trotsky managed to convince the majority of the Central Committee to postpone the uprising until the beginning of its convocation. According to Richard Pipes, this strategy turned out to be "more realistic": the establishment of Bolshevik power was "disguised" as the seizure of power by non-partisan Soviets.

According to the description of Trotsky himself,

...We call this rebellion "legal" – in the sense that it grew out of the "normal" conditions of diarchy. And under the rule of the Compromisers in the Petrograd Soviet, it happened more than once that the Council checked or corrected the decisions of the government.

It seemed to be part of the constitution of the regime that went down in history under the name Kerenshchyna. Having come to power in the Petrograd Soviet, we Bolsheviks only continued and deepened the methods of dual power. We took over the verification of the order for the withdrawal of the garrison. By this we covered up the actual uprising of the Petrograd garrison with the traditions and methods of the legal dual power.

...If the Compromisers caught us on the Soviet legality through the Pre-Parliament, which came out of the Soviets, then we caught them on the same Soviet legality – through the Second Congress of the Soviets... In order for... the maneuver to be victorious, it was necessary the confluence of very exceptional circumstances, large and small. First of all, an army was needed that did not want to fight anymore. The whole course of the revolution, especially in its first period, from February to October, inclusively – we have already spoken about this – would have looked completely different if we didn't have a broken and dissatisfied multimillion peasant army by the time of the revolution... that in this form, this experience will never happen again. But careful study of it is necessary.

== Chronicle of the Congress ==
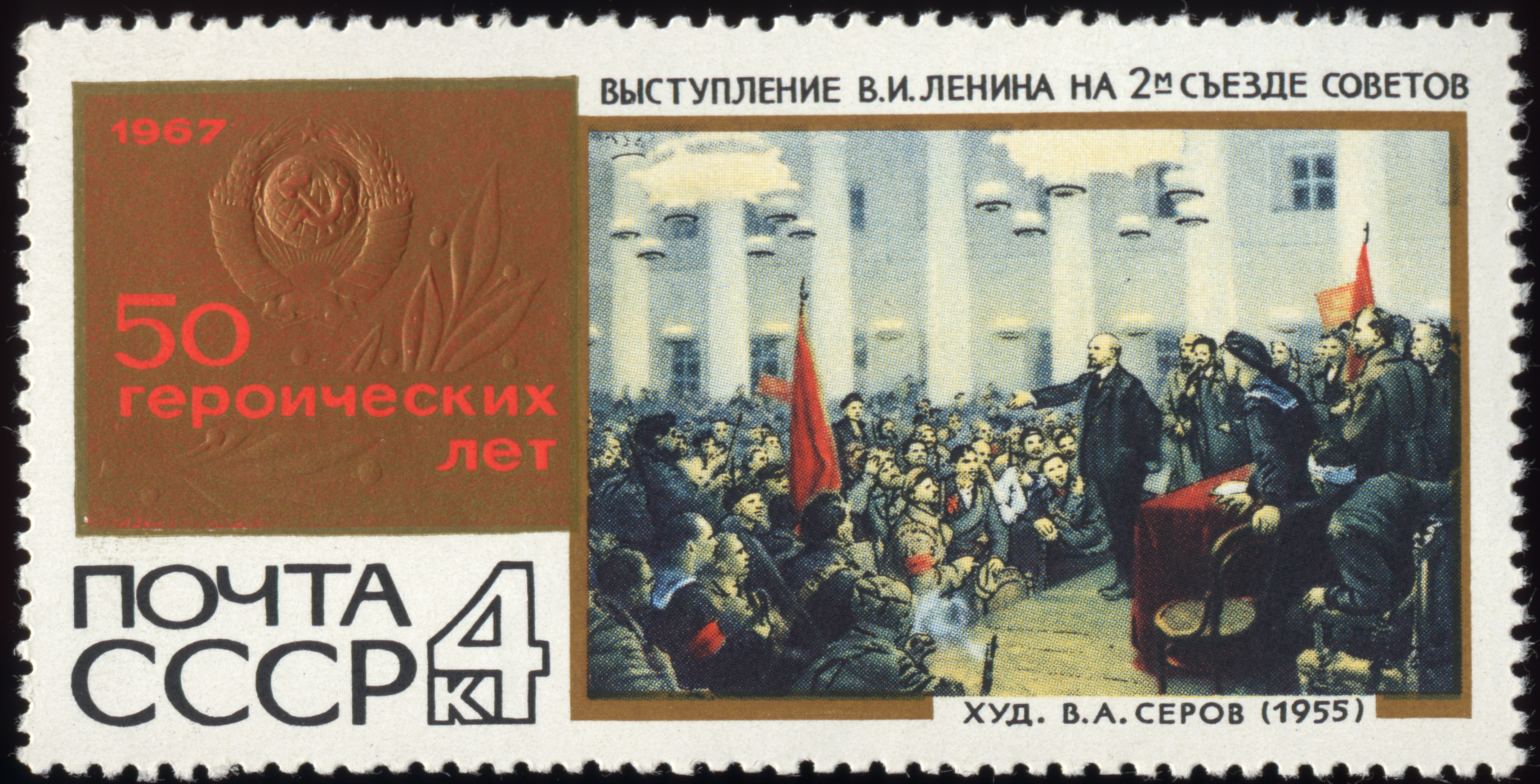
Speech by Vladimir Lenin at the 2nd Congress of Soviets. Artist Vladimir Serov, 1955. Mark, Soviet Union. 50 heroic years. (Denomination: 4 kopecks, 1967)

External images
- Speech by Vladimir Lenin at the 2nd Congress of Soviets
- Painting by Vladimir Serov, 1955
- A painting on the 1967 Cuba stamp, nominal 2 centavos
- Painting by artist Pavel Sokolov-Skaly (published in the Guidebook "Main Pavilion of the All-Union Agricultural Exhibition" in 1954)

The second congress held two plenary sessions.

=== Plenary Session of November 7, 1917 ===
The first session of the congress ran from 10:45 pm on November 7 (OS:October 25) to 6 am on November 8 (OS: October 26) of 1917.

The congress was opened by the Menshevik Dan on November 7 at 10:45 pm, at the height of the armed uprising that began in Petrograd; the opening session was attended by many delegates from the socialist parties coming from all over Russia, from a variety of sectors of society.

On the eve of the October Revolution there were 1429 Soviets of workers, soldiers and peasants' deputies. At the congress, a total of 402 Soviets of Russia, out of all the 1,429 mentioned, were represented in the Congress:

- 195 united Soviets of Workers' and Soldiers' Deputies
- 119 Soviets of Workers' and Soldiers' Deputies with the participation of peasant deputies representing rural farmers
- 46 Soviets of Workers' Deputies
- 22 Soviets of Soldiers and Sailors' Deputies representing the Armed Forces (army and navy)
- and 1 Council of Cossack deputies, representing the socialist-inclined amongst Cossacks within Russia

Precise numbers are difficult to determine, but a preliminary report by the Credentials Committee of the Congress reported that there were about 300 Bolsheviks, 193 SRs (more than half of which were Left SRs), and 82 Mensheviks (of which 14 were Internationalists) with 670 delegates total. According to a 1928 publication of archival documents, there were 338 Bolsheviks, 190 SRs (98 Left, 40 Center, 32 Unaffiliated, 16 Right, 4 National), 69 Mensheviks (33 Internationalist, 22 Defencist, 14 Center), 16 SD Internationalists, 11 National Social Democrats, 1 Popular Socialist, and 23 non-partisans. However, this count is likely based on incomplete data and includes some double-counts and other errors. The St. Peters Encyclopedia states that at the congress' opening, it had 649 total delegates, representing 318 local soviets; 390 being Bolsheviks, 160 SRs, 78 Mensheviks (including 6 Menshevik-Internationalists), and 14 SD Internationalists. The Marxists Internet Archive Encyclopedia counts 649 total delegates, represening 318 local/provincial soviets, with there being 390 Bolsheviks, 160 SRs (of which about 100 were Left SRs), 86 Mensheviks (of which 14 were Menshevik-Internationalists), and 13 of other groups.

Summary of seat counts
Source	Bolsheviks	SD Internationalists	Mensheviks			Socialist-Revolutionaries					Non-Partisans	Others	Total
Source	Bolsheviks	SD Internationalists	Int.	Center	Def.	Left	Center	Right	National	Unaffiliated	Non-Partisans	Others	Total
Preliminary report by the Credentials Committee of the Congress	300	–	14	68		193 (Maj. Left)					95		670
1928 publication of archival documents	338	16	33	14	22	98	40	16	4	32	23	12	648
Saint Petersburg Encyclopedia	390	14	6	72		160					7		649
Marxists Internet Archive Encyclopedia	390	–	14	72		~100	~60				13		649

The congress questionnaire also asked delegates the positions of their local soviets on what they wanted the national government structure to be. 505 said "all power to the soviets", 86 said "all power to the democracy", 55 said a continuation of the Provisional Government's policy of a coalition containing the Kadets, and 21 said a coalition including propertied elements but specifically not the Kadets.

==== The October Revolution and the work of the Congress ====
The Bolsheviks had already won control of most of Petrograd by the beginning of the Congress, but the Winter Palace was not yet taken. The congress was initially scheduled for 2:00pm, but was continuously delayed until 10:40pm. The congress was called into session by Fyodor Dan, who said "the Central Executive Committee considers our customary political address superfluous" because "even now, our comrades who are selflessly fulfilling the obligations we placed upon them are under fire at the Winter Palace."

==== Agenda of the First Session of the 2nd ARCS ====
The congress agreed to elect the Presidium on the basis of proportional representation (although the distribution for each party was based on when there were only 513 delegates in the congress). The Bolsheviks got 14 seats, the SRs got 7 seats, and the Mensheviks got 4 seats (with 1 being a Menshevik-Internationalist). Mikhail Gendelman, a representative of the SR Central Committee, said they would not participate in the presidium, resulting in all 7 SR members being Left SRs. The Mensheviks declined to fill their seats, although the Menshevik-Internationalists reserved the right to do so in the future. A delegate for the Ukrainian Socialist Party, Kulinichenko, asked to have a representative admitted to the Presidium and was accepted.

Following the election of the Presidium, Menshevik-Internationalist leader Julius Martov proposed a resolution to create a democratic coalition government containing all socialist parties, saying it was necessary to stop the ongoing crisis and avert a civil war. The proposal was met with torrents of applause. The SD Internationalists and Left SRs immediately spoke out in support of Martov's resolution, followed by Bolshevik Anatoly Lunacharsky who stated the Bolshevik fraction had "nothing against Martov's proposal". The resolution then passed unanimously.

However, following the passage of the resolution, a series of speakers from the centrist and right-wing factions of the Mensheviks and SRs, angered by the ongoing attacks on the Provisional Government, rose to denounce the Bolsheviks as usurpers, the October insurrection as a criminal venture, and stated the Bolsheviks destroyed the congress' authority and was confronting it with a fait accompli. They then walked out of the congress, declaring they would support anti-Bolshevik resistance.

Martov then proposed another resolution, condemning the Bolsheviks for launching a "coup d'etat that threatens to bring about bloodshed, civil war, and the triumph of a counterrevolution" and stating negotiations should begin for the creation of a coalition government containing all socialist parties. The congress' work would be temporarily suspended until the government was created under the resolution. Trotsky then responded with a speech saying "no compromise is possible" and telling supporters of compromise to "go where you ought to go: into the dustbin of history!". Martov responded with "Then, we'll leave!"

Trotsky then proposed a resolution condemning the departure of the Menshevik and SR delegates as "a weak and treacherous attempt to break up" the congress and endorsing the insurrection. It added that "[t]he departure of the compromisers does not weaken the soviets", but rather "purges the worker and peasant revolution of counterrevolutionary elements". Boris Kamkov, a Left SR, then took the stand and stated they would not leave the congress. However, he spoke out against Trotsky's resolution because "counterrevolutionary efforts are continuing" and they did not yet have the support of "the infantry of the revolution", the peasantry. With this in mind, he said they should try to reach an agreement with the moderate-socialists, not isolate themselves from them. Lunacharsky then responded by arguing it was the moderate-socialists who isolated themselves from the Bolsheviks, not the other way around, citing how the Bolsheviks voted in favor of Martov's resolution at the beginning of the congress. The debate continued for hours until a Left SR demanded a break for fractional discussions, threatening a Left SR walkout if a break wasn't called.

==== Proclamation of the downfall of the Provisional Government ====
Once the congress resumed, Kamenev (who ironically opposed the seizure of power), announced the fall of the Winter Palace and the arrest of the Provisional Government ministers, to enthusiastic applause. One large peasant delegate spoke up to denounce the arrest of the socialist Provisional Government Ministers, saying they "risked their lives" to fight "the tyranny of the Tsar", to which Trotsky responded by calling them false comrades and saying "they didn't use much ceremony with us" after the July Days.

Shortly after this, a group of Menshevik-Internationalists returned to the congress and tried to bring back Martov's proposal for an all-socialist coalition government, but were summarily dismissed. Kamenev, however, did propose to table Trotsky's earlier resolution condemning the departing delegates as treacherous to try to leave the door for further negotiations.

As the Menshevik-Internationalist delegates departed again, Lunacharsky read out a manifesto written by Lenin, "To All Workers, Soldiers, and Peasants". The manifesto endorsed the insurrection, the transfer of supreme political power to the soviets, an immediate armistice in WW1, the transfer without compensation of land to peasant committees, the democratization of the army, workers' control over industry, the convocation of the Constituent Assembly on the set date, providing all cities with bread and all villages with articles of first necessity, and the right of self-determination for all nationalities.

Kamkov said the Left SRs would support the resolution after a minor amendment, which was immediately accepted. The resolution passed overwhelmingly, with just 2 no votes and 12 abstentions. The congress then adjourned for the day.

=== Plenary Session of November 8, 1917 ===
The second session of the congress was opened at 21:00 by Kamenev. Kamenev announced the Presidium had issued decrees for the abolition of the death penalty on the front, the release of soldiers jailed for political crimes, the release of members of land and peasant committees jailed by the Provisional Government, and the arrest of Alexander Kerensky, which were approved by acclamation.

Lenin then took the stand and proposed the Decree on Peace, pledging an end to secret diplomacy and calling for all parties in WW1 to immediately arrange a truce and begin negotiations for a just and democratic peace without annexations or indemnities. It also supported the right of self-determination for all nationalities in the world. The decree ostensibly was provisional until it would be confirmed by the Constituent Assembly

Trotsky explained that it was not actually expected that other governments would listen to this, but that the decree was mainly directed to the masses of Europe, stating "[w]e are placing all our hopes on our revolution unleashing the European revolution. If uprisings by the peoples of Europe do not crush imperialism, we will be crushed." The resolution was adopted unanimously and the delegates sang The Internationale following its passage.

Lenin then presented the Decree on Land that would abolish private land ownership, transferring all private and church lands to land committees and peasant soviets for distribution to individual peasants according to need. When several delegates pointed out this went against the Bolshevik program and was instead based on the SR program, Lenin responded "[s]o be it...as a democratic government, we cannot ignore the feelings of the masses even if we don't agree with them." After a break, the decree was adopted overwhelmingly without discussion.

==== Forming a new government ====
Prior to the opening of the second session of the congress, Kamenev and Yan Berzin offered the Left SRs cabinet seats in the new government. However, the Left SRs declined. While they were sympathetic to the Bolsheviks, they remained committed to their support of a coalition government containing all socialist parties.

At 2:30, Kamenev presented Lenin's proposal for the creation of the Council of People's Commissars (Sovnarkom), an all-Bolshevik governing body chaired by Lenin. Sovnarkom ostensibly was only a provisional government that would implement the program of the congress and operate until the Constituent Assembly.

SD Internationalist Boris Avilov objected to the creation of an all-Bolshevik government, doubting whether it'd be able to alleviate food supply shortages or bring peace to Europe, as other countries would not recognize it. He added the only way peace could be reached would either be an agreement between the Entente and the Central Powers at Russia's expensive or Russia would be forced to accept an onerous separate peace with Germany. He instead proposed a resolution for the creation of a "Provisional Executive Committee" with representation from all parties that won seats in the Soviet Congress, including those that walked out.

Vladimir Karelin, a Left SR, echoed the sentiment, saying that an all-socialist coalition government was necessary and that the government would be unable to implement its policies without the support of the parties that walked out. He said the Bolsheviks weren't to blame for the walkout, but criticized them for forming a "ready-made government" rather than using temporary committees that would resolve critical issues. He also reiterated the principle that any new national government must be subordinate to the CEC.

Trotsky responded by saying a coalition with Mensheviks like Fyedor Dan and Mikhail Liber wouldn't strengthen the government, but rather lead to its downfall, calling those who left the congress "traitors to the revolution with whom we will never unite". He also claimed that if the Left SRs tried to contest the Bolshevis, they would lose mass support and isolate themselves from the poorer peasantry.

Following Trotsky's statement, a representative of the Executive Committee of the All-Russian Union of Railway Workers, Vikzhel, read a telegram stating that Vikzhel opposed the creation of a one-party government and threatening a nationwide strike if an all-socialist coalition government was not created. Despite this, Lenin's resolution easily passed while Avilov's only garnered 150 votes. Vikzhel's threats of a strike would eventually lead to the beginning of the Vikzhel negotiations on November 11, which would also fail.

Right before adjourning, the congress then elected a new Central Executive Committee, chaired by Kamenev, containing 62 Bolsheviks, 29 Left SRs, 6 SD Internationalists, 3 Ukrainian Socialists, and 1 SR Maximalist. It was also agreed that the CEC could be expanded to include peasant soviets, army organizations, and the parties that walked out.

== Composition of the Presidium of the Congress ==
- 14 Bolsheviks: Vladimir Lenin, Grigory Zinoviev, Leon Trotsky, Lev Kamenev, Ephraim Sklyansky, Viktor Nogin, Nikolai Krylenko, Alexandra Kollontai, Alexei Rykov, Vladimir Antonov-Ovseenko, David Riazanov, Nikolay Muralov, Anatoly Lunacharsky, Pēteris Stučka
- 7 Socialist-Revolutionaries (all Left Socialist-Revolutionaries): Boris Kamkov, Maria Spiridonova, Irina Kakhovskaya, Sergey Mstislavsky, Grigory Zaks, Vladimir Karelin, Moshe Baltekaklis-Gutman
- 1 Ukrainian Socialist

4 Mensheviks, including 1 Menshevik-Internationalist were allocated seats, but declined to fill them, although the Menshevik-Internationalists reserved the right to do so.

== Estimates ==
The Second Congress of Soviets of Workers' and Soldiers' Deputies was the second most important event after the armed uprising, the event of the October Revolution of 1917 in Russia.

The congress actually solved the tasks facing the Constituent Assembly in the matter of choosing the form of power in the country. The congress formed the new composition of the All-Russian Central Executive Committee and the first composition of the Council of People's Commissars, issued a number of key decrees (Decree on Peace, Decree on Land, Decree on the Total Power of the Soviets, decree abolishing the death penalty at the front, etc.).

A well-known expert on the revolution of 1917 in Russia, Alexander Rabinovich notes:

Today it is obvious that the main goal pursued by Lenin, insisting on the overthrow of the Provisional Government before the opening of the Congress of Soviets, was to eliminate any possibility of forming a socialist coalition at the congress in which moderate socialists would play a significant role. This calculation was correct.

The Socialist Revolutionary and Menshevik boycott of the Congress effectively unleashed the Bolsheviks, making the first composition of the new government 100% Bolshevik. The contemporary Nikolai Sukhanov in his fundamental work "Notes on the Revolution" mentioned with regret:

...We left, it is not known where and why, breaking with the Council, mixing ourselves with elements of counter-revolution, discrediting and humiliating ourselves in the eyes of the masses, undermining the whole future of our organization and our principles. This is not enough: we left, completely unleashing the hands of the Bolsheviks, making them full masters of the whole situation, giving them the whole arena of revolution... Leaving the congress, leaving the Bolsheviks with only the Left Social Revolutionary guys and the weak group of the New Lifers, we gave the Bolsheviks a monopoly over the Council, over the masses, over the revolution. By our own foolish will, we ensured the victory of the whole line of Lenin...

Apparently, during the October Revolution and immediately after it, the establishment of a one-party system was not yet part of the plans of the Bolsheviks. By the autumn of 1917, Lenin and Trotsky managed to put together a broad coalition of radicals – Bolsheviks, Left Social Revolutionaries, anarchists, inter-district and non-factional Social Democrats, which included Trotsky himself. The Left Social Revolutionaries took an active part in the revolution, actively supporting the Bolsheviks, including at the Congress of Soviets of the Northern Region, at the Second All-Russian Congress of Soviets of Workers' and Soldiers' Deputies, at the Peasant Congress; the Petrograd Military Revolutionary Committee, in addition to the Bolsheviks and the Left Social Revolutionaries, also included anarchists.

If the first post-October composition of the Council of People's Commissars was Bolshevik (since December 1917 – Bolshevik-Left Socialist Revolutionary), then the elected Congress of Councils of the All-Russian Central Executive Committee ("Soviet parliament") had a more diverse party composition. Although the Bolsheviks and the Left Social Revolutionaries secured a majority in advance, a fraction of the Menshevik-internationalists close to the Bolsheviks, also Ukrainian socialists, were represented in the All-Russian Central Executive Committee, there was one representative of the radical Maximalist Socialist Revolutionaries. Representatives of moderate socialists did not join the All-Russian Central Executive Committee because of their boycott.

On November 14, 1917, the All-Russian Central Executive Committee adopted a resolution "On the terms of an agreement with other parties", in which it explicitly stated that it considers the "agreement of the socialist parties desirable". The terms of such an agreement were set forth as follows:

1. Recognition of the program of the Soviet government, as expressed in the decrees on land, peace, and both projects on workers' control.

2. Recognition of the need for a ruthless struggle against counter-revolution (Kerensky, Kornilov and Kaledin).

3. Recognition of the Second All-Russian Congress as the sole source of power.

4. The government is responsible to the Central Executive Committee.

5. Addition of the Central Executive Committee, except for organizations that are not members of the Council, by representatives from Councils of workers, soldiers and peasants' deputies not represented in it; proportional representation of the workers' and soldiers' deputies who left the congress, all-Russian professional organizations, such as: the Council of Trade Unions, the Union of Factory and Factory Committees, Vikzhel, the Union of Postal and Telegraph Workers and Employees, provided and only after re-election of the All-Russian Council of Peasant Deputies and organizations that have not been re-elected in the last three months.

In Soviet historiography, the Second Congress of Soviets was traditionally considered as a legitimation of the new government ("the transfer of power seized by the insurgent people into the hands of the Soviets was formalized and legally secured by the Second All-Russian Congress of Workers' and Soldiers' Deputies'"). On the other hand, unlike the Constituent Assembly, the peasant majority of the country was not represented at all at the Congress: the Second All-Russian Congress of Soviets of Peasant Deputies passed a month later and was marked by a tough struggle of the Bolshevik-Left Socialist Revolutionary coalition with the Right Social Revolutionaries.

As Richard Pipes stresses, the total representation of the Bolsheviks and the Left Social Revolutionaries at the Congress of Workers 'and Soldiers' Deputies was artificially overestimated by about two times. In addition, according to the researcher, without the help of the Left Social Revolutionaries, who positioned themselves as a peasant party, the Bolsheviks would not have been able to seize control of the Peasant Congress. However, the Left Social Revolutionaries, following the moderate socialists, refused to enter the new government.

On November 15, 1917, the All-Russian Central Executive Committee of the Workers' Soldiers and the All-Russian Central Executive Committee of the Peasant Congresses merged, after which the Left Social Revolutionaries nevertheless agreed to join the Council of People's Commissars, forming a government coalition with the Bolsheviks.

== Accepted Documents ==
Documents of the Congress (decrees, resolutions, etc.) that were adopted at the Congress with a date and quotations:

=== First Plenary Session ===
- Workers, soldiers and peasants! (adopted at the first meeting at 5 am on November 7, 1917; "immediate truce on all fronts", "all local authority passes to the Soviets of Workers, Soldiers and Peasants' Deputies", "Long live the revolution!")

=== Second Plenary Session ===
- Abolition of the death penalty (adopted at the second session at 9 pm on November 8, "at the front");
- All provincial and district councils of workers, peasant, soldier and peasant deputies (adopted at the second meeting at 10 o'clock in the evening; "All power now belongs to the Soviets", "all arrested members of the land committees are released");
- From the All-Russian Congress of Soviets (taken at the second session at 10 o'clock in the evening; "measures for the immediate arrest of Kerensky");
- Decree on Peace (adopted at the second meeting at 11 o'clock in the evening on November 8);
- Decree on Land (adopted at the second meeting at 2 am, November 8–9);
- Resolution on the pogrom movement (adopted at the second meeting at the 2nd o'clock in the morning from November 8–9; on preventing any pogroms of any kind);
- Council of People's Commissars (adopted at the second meeting at 5 o'clock in the morning on November 9; "for a new form for governing the country");
- To the front ("On the formation of revolutionary committees in the army") (probably, the order was made between the first and second meetings);
- Cossack brothers! (time is not set; about the alliance of the Cossacks with the soldiers, workers and peasants of all Russia);
- To all railway workers (time is not fixed; "measures to preserve the full order on the railways").

== See also ==
- Bibliography of the Russian Revolution and Civil War
- Outline of the Russian Revolution and Civil War
- Index of articles related to the Russian Revolution and Civil War

== Sources ==
- Vladimir Lenin. The Second All-Russian Congress of Workers' and Soldiers' Deputies' Councils of November 7–8, 1917. Complete Works, 5th Edition, Volume 35
- The collection of laws and orders of the government for the years 1917–1918. Moscow, 1942
- Decrees of Soviet power, volume 1, Moscow, 1957
- October armed uprising in Petrograd. Documents and materials, Moscow, 1957
- Second All-Russian Congress of Workers' and Soldiers' Deputies. Collection of documents. Moscow, Leningrad, 1928
