= All-Russian Central Executive Committee =

Governing body of the RSFSR (1917–1937)

All-Russian Central Executive Committee Всероссийский Центральный Исполнительный Комитет

Type
- Type: Unicameral

History
- Established: 7 July 1917
- Disbanded: 15 July 1938
- Preceded by: Provisional Council of the Russian Republic
- Succeeded by: Supreme Soviet of the RSFSR
- Seats: 101

Elections
- Voting system: Election by the All-Russian Congress of Soviets

Meeting place
- Moscow

The All-Russian Central Executive Committee (Russian: Всероссийский Центральный Исполнительный Комитет (ВЦИК), romanized: Vserossijskij Tsentraĺný Ispolniteĺný Komitet (VTsIK)) was (June – November 1917) a permanent body formed by the First All-Russian Congress of Soviets of Workers' and Soldiers' Deputies (held from June 16 to July 7, 1917 in Petrograd), then became the supreme governing body of the Russian Soviet Federative Socialist Republic in between sessions of the All-Russian Congress of Soviets from 1917 to 1937. In 1937, the All-Russian Central Executive Committee was replaced with the Presidium of the Supreme Soviet of the Russian SFSR.

At formation, its full name was the All-Russian Central Executive Committee of the Soviets of Workers' and Soldiers' Deputies. Later it was the All-Russian Central Executive Committee of the Soviets of Workers', Peasants', Red Army, and Cossack Deputies (Russian: Всероссийский Центральный Исполнительный Комитет Советов рабочих, крестьянских, красноармейских и казачьих депутатов).

== Organization ==
The 1918 Russian Constitution required that the All-Russian Central Executive Committee convene the All-Russian Congress of Soviets at least twice a year (Statute 26 of Article III). Additional sessions could be called by the All-Russian Central Executive Committee or on the request of local Soviets. The All-Russian Central Executive Committee was elected by a full Congress, with no more than 200 individuals. It was completely subordinate to the Congress. The functions of the Collegiate or the Presidium were not declared in the Constitution, but presumably they were supposed to be purely supervisory or revisionary bodies.

== Provisions ==
The All-Russian Central Executive Committee gave a general direction for the policies of the Worker-Peasant government and all bodies of the Soviet power in the country. It united and coordinated activities for legislation and administration as well as supervised the endorsement of the Soviet Constitution, declarations of the All-Russian Congress of Soviets and central bodies of the Soviet power. The All-Russian Central Executive Committee reviewed and adopted the projects of decrees and other propositions introduced by the Council of People's Commissars and separate departments as well as issued its own decrees and instructions.

The All-Russian Central Executive Committee summoned the All-Russian Congress of Soviets to which it presented the reports on its activity, general policy, and other inquiries. The All-Russian Central Executive Committee formed the Council of People's Commissars for general administrative affairs of the republic and departments (called People's Commissariats) for the management of separate branches of administration. Deputies of the All-Russian Central Executive Committee worked in the departments or executed special assignments of the All-Russian Central Executive Committee.

State budgets (for the RSFSR as a whole and for each of the republic's administrative divisions) were decided jointly by the All-Russian Central Executive Committee and the All-Russian Congress of Soviets.

== History ==
The first All-Russian Central Executive Committee was elected at the First All-Russian Congress of Workers' and Soldiers' Deputies' Soviets, held in Petrograd, June 3–24, 1917. The first Central Executive Committee of the All-Russian Congress of Soviets was not a governing body, and its chairman Nikolai Chkheidze was not the head of the Russian state.

=== Menshevik period ===
The congress elected the All-Russian Central Executive Committee of 320 deputies. It included 123 Mensheviks, 119 Social Revolutionaries, 58 Bolsheviks, 13 United Social Democrats, 7 others, which roughly corresponded to the Social Revolutionary-Menshevik composition of the delegates to the First Congress of Soviets. The Menshevik Nikolay Chkheidze became the chairman of the All-Russian Central Executive Committee.

After the July events, representatives of the All-Russian Central Executive Committee took part in the work of the commission on the establishment of order in Petrograd, established by the Provisional Government. The All-Russian Central Executive Committee supported the actions of the Provisional Government, welcomed the appointment of Social Revolutionary Aleksandr Kerensky as minister-chairman of the government and decided to recognize unlimited powers for the government.

Until August 1917, All-Russian Central Executive Committee sat in the Tauride Palace, after which it moved to Smolny.

=== Bolshevik ascendency ===
In early September, after the liquidation of the Kornilov revolt, the All-Russian Central Executive Committee, jointly with the executive committee of the All-Russian Council of Peasant Deputies, initiated the convening of a Democratic Conference, as opposed to the August Moscow State Conference. In a telegram inviting representatives of parties and public organizations to take part in the meeting signed by the Chairmen of the Central Executive Committees Nikolay Chkheidze and Nikolay Avksentiev, it was said that "a congress of all organized Democracy of Russia in Petrograd would create a strong revolutionary government capable of uniting all revolutionary Russia to repel external to enemies and for the suppression of any attempts on conquered freedom".

The All-Russian Central Executive Committee tried to counteract the process of Bolshevization of Soviets, which began in August, which intensified in September–October 1917 and was accompanied by the ousting of moderate socialists that had previously dominated them, especially the Socialist Revolutionaries and Mensheviks, from these authorities.

By the beginning of November, the Bolsheviks occupied up to 90% of the seats in the Petrograd Soviet, up to 60% in Moscow, the majority of the seats in the 80 local Soviets of large industrial cities. In September, the Bolshevik Viktor Nogin became the chairman of the Presidium of the Moscow Council, Lev Trotsky – the chairman of the Petrograd Council. Soldiers' committees, primarily the Northern and Western fronts, the Petrograd garrison and Central Committee of the Baltic Fleet went over to the Bolsheviks. At the Second Congress of the Deputies of the Baltic Fleet, the Bolshevik-Left Socialist Revolutionary Central Committee of the Baltic Fleet was elected. "Bolshevization" of soldiers' committees, starting from the bottom, reached the committees of the regimental level. At the same time, the Army Committees until November 1917 remained Socialist Revolutionary–Menshevik.

Having received an absolute majority of seats in the Petrograd Council, the Bolsheviks began active work in winning the upcoming Second All-Russian Congress of Soviets, and, accordingly, its permanent body, the All-Russian Central Executive Committee. On the eve of the Second Congress, the Bolshevik Petrograd Soviet organized the First Congress of Soviets of the Northern Region, in which Petrograd was included, with the participation of representatives of the Baltic Fleet. The congress, which took place on October 24–26 in Petrograd, was characterized by a sharp predominance of radical socialists – the Bolsheviks and the Left Socialist Revolutionaries.

The Socialist Revolutionary-Menshevik All-Russian Central Executive Committee refused to recognize the legality of this congress, accusing the Bolsheviks of violating the procedures for electing delegates. On the other hand, the leadership of the Russian Social Democratic Labor Party (Bolsheviks), and first of all Lenin personally, considered the possibility of declaring the Congress of the Northern Region to be the highest authority, but delegates adopted a resolution that the Second All-Russian Congress of Soviets should decide the issue of power. The Northern Regional Committee, elected at the congress of 11 Bolsheviks and 6 left-wing Socialist Revolutionaries, launched a stormy activity to prepare the Second All-Russian Congress. This activity took place against the backdrop of the reluctance of the Mensheviks and right-wing Socialist Revolutionaries to convene this Congress as a matter of fact which predetermined the will of the Constituent Assembly on the question of power in the country. Particularly strong was the opposition of the Right Socialist Revolutionary permanent bodies of the First All-Russian Congress of Soviets of Peasant Deputies. Richard Pipes also indicates that the initiative of the regional Congress of Soviets to convene the Second All-Russian Congress of Soviets was itself illegal and not coordinated with the old Soviet bodies. According to the procedures that existed at that time, only the All-Russian Central Executive Committee – the permanent body of the previous Congress – was entitled to convene a new All-Russian Congress of Soviets. However, the All-Russian Central Executive Committee was of the Social Revolutionary-Menshevik composition, and he was not going to convene a new Congress. The old Central Executive Committee declared that, in connection with violations, the Second Congress would be only an illegal "private meeting of individual Soviets". On October 19, the official Soviet newspaper Izvestia noted that

No other committee [except the All-Russian Central Executive Committee] is authorized and does not have the right to take the initiative to convene a congress. Nevertheless, the Northern Regional Congress, convened in violation of all the rules established for regional conventions and representing random and randomly chosen Councils, has the right to do so.

The Socialist Revolutionary and Menshevik All-Russian Central Executive Committee accused the Bolsheviks of frauds in organizing the elections for the Second Congress; in violation of electoral procedures, the Bolsheviks organized the election of soldiers' delegates not from army-level army committees, but from regimental, divisional, and corps-level, mainly pro-Bolshevik soldier-level committees, and the Bolsheviks launched re-election and army committees. In addition, the Bolsheviks took full advantage of the chaos and disproportionate representation that existed in the Soviet system at that time, artificially overstating the number of delegates from those Soviets where they had the majority. As a result, for example, 10% of the Congress delegates were Latvians, which did not correspond to their share in the population. The peasant majority of the country's population, which supported primarily the Social Revolutionaries, was not represented at all at the Congress; the Second All-Russian Congress of Peasant Deputies was held, like the First Congress, separately from the Congress of Workers' and Soldiers' Deputies.

In advance declaring the Second Congress of Soviets illegal, the All-Russian Central Executive Committee, however, agreed to convene it, postponing only the opening date of the Congress from October 20 (NS: November 2) to October 25 (NS: November 7) of 1917.

=== After the October Revolution ===
The congress opened on November 7 at 10:40 pm, at the height of the armed uprising that began in Petrograd. The peasant councils and all the soldier-level committees of the army refused to participate in the activities of the congress. The Mensheviks and Socialist Revolutionaries condemned the Bolshevik's actions as an "illegal coup". The old composition of the All-Russian Central Executive Committee also condemned the Bolsheviks, saying that

The Central Executive Committee considers the Second Congress failed and regards it as a private meeting of the Bolshevik delegates. The decisions of this congress, as illegal, are declared by the Central Executive Committee as optional for local Soviets and all army committees. The Central Executive Committee calls on the Soviets and army organizations to rally around him to defend the revolution. The Central Executive Committee will convene a new congress of Soviets as soon as the conditions are created for its proper convocation.

On November 8, at the evening session of the congress, Lenin proposed to dissolve the old composition of the All-Russian Central Executive Committee, choosing instead the new composition of the All-Russian Central Executive Committee and forming a temporary workers' and peasants' government – the Council of People's Commissars.

Among the 101 members of the new All-Russian Central Executive Committee were 62 Bolsheviks and 29 Left Social Revolutionaries. Although the Bolsheviks and the Left Social Revolutionaries secured a majority in advance, the All-Russian Central Executive Committee also represented a fraction of the Menshevik Internationalists close to the Bolsheviks, Ukrainian socialists, there was one representative of the radical faction of the maximalist Socialist Revolutionaries. Representatives of moderate socialists did not join the All-Russian Central Executive Committee because of their boycott. Lev Kamenev became the chairman of the All-Russian Central Executive Committee. On November 9, the Congress issued an appeal to the local Soviets with a call to "rally around the new composition of the Central Executive Committee", the powers of the commissars of the former (Socialist Revolutionary-Menshevik) composition of the All-Russian Central Executive Committee in the army and on the ground were declared discontinued.

On November 14, 1917, the new All-Russian Central Executive Committee adopted a resolution "On the terms of an agreement with other parties", in which it explicitly indicated that it considers the "agreement of the socialist parties desirable". The terms of such an agreement were set forth as follows:

1. Recognition of the program of the Soviet government, as expressed in the decrees on land, peace, and both projects on workers' control.

2. Recognition of the need for a ruthless struggle against counter-revolution (Kerensky, Kornilov and Kaledin).

3. Recognition of the Second All-Russian Congress as the sole source of power.

4. The government is responsible to the Central Executive Committee.

5. Addition of the Central Executive Committee, except for organizations that are not members of the Council, by representatives from Councils of workers', soldiers' and peasants' deputies not represented in it; proportional representation of the workers' and soldiers' deputies who left the congress, all-Russian professional organizations, such as: the Council of Trade Unions, the Union of Factory and Factory Committees, Vikzhel, the Union of Postal and Telegraph Workers and Employees, provided and only after re-election of the All-Russian Council of Peasant Deputies and organizations that have not been re-elected in the last three months.

On November 28, 1917, the All-Russian Central Executive Committee, elected by the Second All-Russian Congress of Workers' and Soldiers' Deputies' Soviets, merged with the executive committee (108 people) elected at the Extraordinary All-Russian Peasants' Congress, after which the left Socialist Revolutionaries agreed to join the Council of People's Commissars of the Russian Soviet Republic and form a coalition with the Bolsheviks.

It was composed of 62 Bolsheviks, 29 Left SRs, and 10 Mensheviks and Right SRs The chairman of the second All-Russian Central Executive Committee was Lev Kamenev, who directed the day-to-day work of the committee and had a tie-breaking vote.

Following the adoption of the 1936 Soviet Constitution, the All-Russian Central Executive Committee was replaced with the Presidium of the Supreme Soviet of the Russian SFSR.

== Chairmen of the Central Executive Committee of the RSFSR ==
- Lev Kamenev (November 9–21, 1917)
- Yakov Sverdlov (November 21, 1917 – March 16, 1919; died in office)
- Mikhail Vladimirsky (acting; March 16–30, 1919)
- Mikhail Kalinin (March 30, 1919 – July 15, 1938)

On December 30, 1922, the Soviet Union was formed. It comprised the Russian SFSR and other communist-controlled Soviet republics. Mikhail Kalinin retained his position as chairman of the Central Executive Committee of the All-Russian Congress of Soviets and became chairman of the newly formed Central Executive Committee of the All-Union Congress of Soviets as well. Both positions were mostly ceremonial, increasingly so in later years.

== See also ==
- Bibliography of the Russian Revolution and Civil War § Government
- Bibliography of Stalinism and the Soviet Union § Government
- Supreme Soviet
