= First All-Russian Congress of Soviets of Workers' and Soldiers' Deputies =

1917 meeting in Petrograd, Russia

←	Conference of the Soviets	Second Congress	→
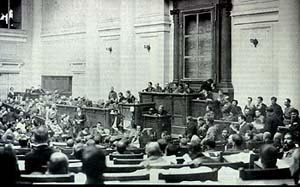
- Session of the Congress

Overview
- Legislative body: All-Russian Congress of Soviets
- Meeting place: First Cadet Corps
- Term: 16 June 1917 – 7 July 1917
- Party control: Socialist Revolutionary Party

The First All-Russian Congress of Soviets of Workers' and Soldiers' Deputies was held from 16 June to 7 July 1917 N.S. in Petrograd in the building of the First Cadet Corps on Vasilyevsky Island. The First All-Russian Congress of Soviets, at which the majority belonged to the Mensheviks and Socialist-Revolutionaries, rejected the resolutions proposed by the Bolsheviks to end the war and transfer all power to the Soviets and adopted Socialist-Revolutionary and Menshevik resolutions proclaiming the full support of the Socialist Ministers and the continuation of the "revolutionary war" on the basis of the rejection of annexations and indemnities.

The Congress elected its permanent body, the All-Russian Central Executive Committee of the Soviets of Workers' and Soldiers' Deputies, whose chairman was elected Menshevik Nikolay Chkheidze, who was also Chairman of the Executive Committee of the Petrograd Soviet until 19 September 1917.

== Background ==
Shortly after the February Revolution, the Petrograd Soviet began preparations for the convening of the All-Russian Conference of Soviets of Workers' and Soldiers' Deputies, which took place from 11 to 16 April 1917. In their resolution, delegates endorsed a policy of continuing Russia's participation in a world war ("defencism"), supporting the policy of the Provisional Government on this issue, subject to "refusal to seize aspirations".

The meeting was a major step in the design of the Soviet system; the next step in the formation of "Soviet legality" was the convocation of the First All-Russian Congress of Soviets of Workers' and Soldiers' Deputies. The decision to hold the Congress as the highest organ of the Soviets was taken at the Meeting, organizational work was entrusted to the Executive Committee of the Petrograd Soviet, which included 16 representatives of provincial Soviets and front-line army units, which expanded its authority throughout the country until the convocation of the congress.

The norms of representation were as follows: Councils of districts with a population of 25,000 to 50,000 voters sent two delegates, from 50,000 to 75,000 – three, from 75,000 to 100,000 – four, from 100,000 to 150,000 – five, from 150 000 to 200 000 – six, over 200 000 – eight.

== Composition ==
Party membership of the First All-Russian Congress of Workers' and Soldiers' Deputies' Soviets
Party	Seats
Socialist Revolutionaries	285
Mensheviks	248
Bolsheviks	105
Mensheviks-Internationalists	32
Non-factional socialists	73
Mensheviks-Combiners (United Social Democrats)	10
Bund	10
Plekhanov's Unity Faction	3
People's Socialists	3
Trudoviks	5
Communist Anarchists	1
Socialist revolutionaries and social democrats standing on the platform	2

The Congress was attended by 1090 delegates representing 305 united Soviets of Workers', Soldiers' and Peasants' Deputies, 53 regional, provincial and district associations of Soviets, 21 organizations of the active army, 5 fleet Soviets and 8 rear military organizations.

About 777 delegates state their political leanings, among them 285 Socialist Revolutionaries, 248 Mensheviks, 105 Bolsheviks, 32 Mensheviks-Internationalists, 10 Mensheviks-Combiners and 24 more delegates who were in other factions and groups.

== Agenda ==
The following questions were brought up for discussion at the congress:

1. Revolutionary democracy and government power;
2. Attitude towards war: issues of defense and struggle for peace;
3. Preparation for the Constituent Assembly;
4. National question;
5. The land question and questions of peasants', workers' and soldiers' life;
6. Organization of production, distribution, transport and control over it;
7. Food issue;
8. Financial policy issues;
9. Local government;
10. Organizational issues and elections.

== Bolsheviks' demarche ==
At the congress, the Bolsheviks were in the minority, making up only 13.5% of the delegates who declared their party affiliation. However, despite this, the leader of the Bolsheviks, Vladimir Lenin, went to a loud demarche, responding to the statement by the chairman of the Petrograd Soviet Menshevik Irakli Tsereteli: "At the moment in Russia there is no political party that would say: give power to our hands, leave, we will take your place. There is no such party in Russia" with a cry from the spot: "There is such a party!". The Socialist Revolutionary-Menshevik majority met Lenin's demarche with a laugh, to which he replied: "You can laugh as much as you want... Trust us, and we will give you our program. Our conference on April 29 gave this program. Unfortunately, it is not considered and is not guided by it. Apparently, it is required to find out her popularly". In his speech, Lenin proposed "arrest the 50-100 largest millionaires", introduce workers' control in the industry and make peace.

== Congress Decisions ==
The delegates to the congress rejected the resolutions proposed by the Bolsheviks on ending the war and transferring all power to the Soviets, for which they called Lenin "compromisers". The congress adopted the Socialist Revolutionary and Menshevik resolutions proclaiming the full support of the socialist ministers and the continuation of the "revolutionary war" on the principles of refusal of annexations and indemnities.

The congress elected its permanent body, the All-Russian Central Executive Committee of Workers' and Soldiers' Deputies' Soviets, consisting of 320 deputies. The composition of the All-Russian Central Executive Committee was also Socialist Revolutionary-Menshevik: 123 Mensheviks, 119 Social Revolutionaries, 58 Bolsheviks, 13 United Social Democrats, 7 others. Menshevik Nikolay Chkheidze became the chairman of the All-Russian Central Executive Committee.

== Situation around the Congress ==
On 21 June 1917, the Central Committee and the Petrograd Committee of the Russian Social Democratic Labor Party (Bolsheviks) announced their intention to hold a peaceful demonstration on 23 June 1917 in support of the demands of the striking workers of Petrograd (see Conflict over Dacha Durnovo). The next day, however, under the pressure of the Socialist Revolutionary-Menshevik majority of the Congress of Soviets, which accused the Bolsheviks of organizing a "military plot", the Central Committee of the Russian Social Democratic Labor Party (Bolsheviks), not wanting to oppose itself to the Congress, canceled its demonstration.

On 1 July 1917 a mass demonstration organized by the Congress of Soviets was held in Petrograd on the Field of Mars. However, contrary to the expectations of the organizers who planned to hold a general political demonstration of confidence in the Provisional Government, the action, which was attended by about 500 thousand people, was held under the Bolshevik slogans "Down with ten capitalist ministers!", "It's time to end the war!", "All power to the Soviets!" that testified to the gap between the mood of the masses of the capital and the policies of the Provisional Government and the leadership of the Soviets.

A group of armed anarchists joined the manifestation during the rally raided the Kresty Prison, freeing six of their supporters and a member of the Military Organization of the Russian Social Democratic Labor Party (Bolsheviks) Flavian Khaustov.

Numerous demonstrations of workers and soldiers under the slogans of the Bolsheviks took place on this day also in Moscow, Kiev, Kharkov, Minsk, Ivanovo-Voznesensk, Tver, Nizhny Novgorod and other cities.

On 2 July 1917, a separate resolution of the congress supported the offensive of the Russian army that began at the front.

== See also ==
- Bibliography of the Russian Revolution and Civil War
- Outline of the Russian Revolution and Civil War
- Index of articles related to the Russian Revolution and Civil War
- Second All-Russian Congress of Workers' and Soldiers' Deputies' Soviets
- All-Russian Congress of Soviets

== Sources ==
- Andrey Pokrovsky. First Workers' and Soldiers' Parliament of Russia. The First All-Russian Congress of Workers' and Soldiers' Deputies' Soviets ( 3–24 June 1917): Experience in reconstructing the list of participants; the contours of the social portrait. Executive editor Vladimir Lavrov. Moscow – 2001.
- All-Russian meeting of the Soviets of workers' and soldiers' deputies. (Verbatim Report), Moscow — Leningrad, 1927.
- First All-Russian Congress of Workers' and Soldiers' Deputies. (Stenographic Report), Volume 1-2, Moscow-Leningrad, 1930-31.
