= Decree on Peace =

Statement of Russian foreign policy goals by Lenin after the October Revolution

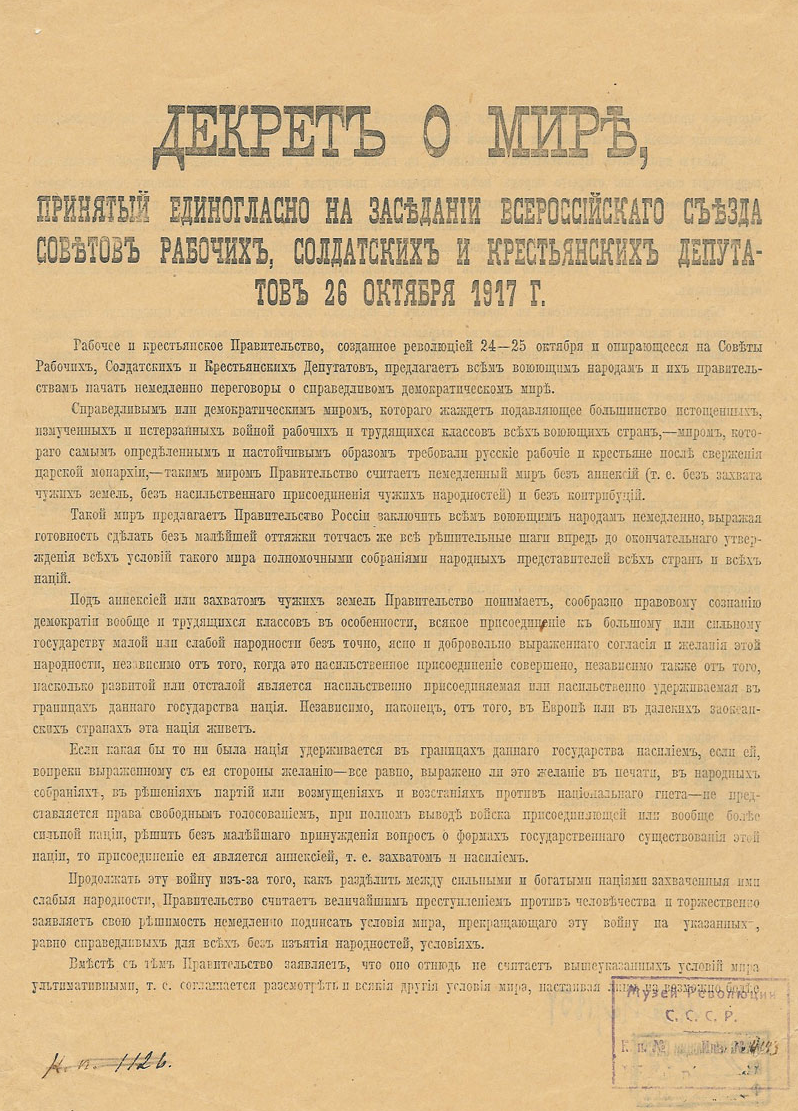
Decree on Peace title page

The Decree on Peace (Russian: Декрет о мире), written by Vladimir Lenin, was passed by the Second All-Russian Congress of Soviets of Workers' and Soldiers' Deputies on the 8 November [O.S. 26 October] 1917, following the October Revolution. It was published in the Izvestiya newspaper, #208, 9 November [O.S. 27 October] 1917. Proposing an immediate withdrawal of Russia from World War I, the decree was ultimately implemented through the Treaty of Brest-Litovsk. Woodrow Wilson's famous "Fourteen Points" of January 1918 were largely a response to this decree.

== Significance ==
The Decree on Peace was an appeal to the governments of all the warring states and to their peoples to conclude an immediate truce (armistice). It is common among historians to assert that from September 1917 the Russian army was already in the process of complete disintegration. Marc Ferro, however, claims that only after the October Revolution the great exodus of soldiers from the front began, to enjoy the promised gains of peace and land.

The Peace Decree had two audiences: war-weary Russians and the workers of the other belligerent nations. The new People’s Commissar for External Affairs, Leon Trotsky published the secret treaties between Nicholas II and the Triple Entente in order to provoke international popular outrage. However, the likelihood of European insurrections was overestimated and instead of triggering a universal proletarian peace, the new regime became embroiled in negotiations with the German Empire and the Central Powers, resulting in the Treaty of Brest-Litovsk on 3 March 1918 under which the Russian Empire lost 34% of its population, 54% of its industrial land, 89% of its coalfields, and 26% of its railways. This created conditions for nationalist revolutions in Ukraine, Poland, Finland, and the Baltic provinces (Latvia, Lithuania, and Estonia). The Allies of World War I, seeking to restore the Russian Empire's involvement in the Great War, responded by sending troops to support the pro-Tsarist White movement in the Russian Civil War.

== Extracts ==
"The Workers' and Peasants' Government, created by the revolution of 24–25 October, and drawing its strength from the Soviets of Workers', Soldiers', and Peasants' Deputies, proposes to all warring peoples and their governments to begin at once negotiations leading to a just democratic peace".

"A just and democratic peace for which the great majority of wearied, tormented and war-exhausted toilers and labouring classes of all belligerent countries are thirsting, a peace which the Russian workers and peasants have so loudly and insistently demanded since the overthrow of the Tsar's monarchy, such a peace the government considers to be an immediate peace without annexations (i.e., without the seizure of foreign territory and the forcible annexation of foreign nationalities) and without reparations".

"The Russian Government proposes to all warring peoples that this kind of peace be concluded at once; it also expresses its readiness to take immediately, without the least delay, all decisive steps pending the final confirmation of all the terms of such a peace by the plenipotentiary assemblies of all countries and all nations".

Invited "All belligerents to open negotiation without delay for a just and democratic peace [...] a peace without annexations and reparations".

== Music ==
In 1967 the East German composer Tilo Medek set parts of the text to music for speaking voice and four percussionists, which was banned in East Germany.
