= Gavrilovskoye, Vladimir Oblast =

Gavrilovskoye Гавриловское
- Selo
- Location within Vladimir Oblast Location within Russia
- Coordinates: 56°23′N 40°16′E
- Country: Russia
- Region: Vladimir Oblast
- District: Suzdalsky District
- Time zone: UTC+3:00

Gavrilovskoye (Russian: Гаври́ловское) is a rural locality (a selo) in Seletskoye Rural Settlement, Suzdalsky District, Vladimir Oblast, Russia. The population was 980 as of 2010. There are 11 streets.

== Geography ==
Gavrilovskoye is located 14 km southwest of Suzdal (the district's administrative centre) by road. Semyonovskoye-Sovetskoye is the nearest rural locality.
