= Moscow State Conference =

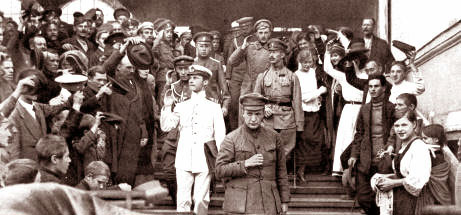
Participants in the Moscow State Meeting in front of the Bolshoi Theater. In the foreground – Alexander Kerensky

The State Conference in Moscow (Moscow State Conference) (also known as Moscow Council of the Conference of Public Figures) was an all-Russian political forum convened by the Provisional Government. The meeting was held in Moscow on 12-15 August (O.S.) 25–28 August, 1917 (N.S.). The meeting was convened by Kerensky's Second Government and attended by actual and former Duma members, representatives of all major political parties, commercial and industrial organizations, the unions, army and academic institutions, to inform Russian citizens about the political situation in the country and to unite the forces supporting it among different layers and groups of Russian society.

== Convocation history and composition ==
Formally, the idea of holding the meeting was put forward by Alexander Kerensky. His proposal was formalized by resolution of the meeting of the Provisional Government No. 144 of July 27, 1917, in which the purpose of the meeting was defined as the unity of state power with all organized forces of the country in view of the exclusivity of the events experienced.

The meeting was attended by about 2,500 people: 488 deputies of the State Duma of all convocations, 129 representatives from the Soviets of Peasant Deputies, 100 from the Soviets of Workers' and Soldiers' Deputies, 147 from the City Duma, 117 from the Army and Navy, 313 from cooperatives, 150 from commercial and industrial circles and banks, 176 from trade unions, 118 from zemstvos, 83 from the intelligentsia, 58 from national organizations, 24 from the clergy, etc.

The councils were represented by delegations of the Central Executive Committee of the Soviets of Workers' and Soldiers' Deputies and the Central Executive Committee of the Soviets of Peasant Deputies, consisting of Mensheviks and Socialist Revolutionaries. The Bolsheviks – representatives of the Soviets – intended to make a declaration at the meeting exposing the counter-revolutionary, in their opinion, sense of the meeting, and then leave it. However, the Menshevik and Socialist Revolutionary leaders of the Central Executive Committee of the Soviets of Workers' and Soldiers' Deputies did not admit them to the delegation. Nevertheless, the Bolsheviks were able to attend the Conference among the trade union, cooperative and some other delegations, but were deprived of the opportunity to read out their declaration and submitted it to the Presidium of the Conference for publication.

== Speeches, results, assessments ==
The meeting was chaired by the Minister-Chairman of the Provisional Government, Alexander Kerensky. Opening the meeting, he assured that with iron and blood he would crush all attempts to resist the government.

On the first day of the meeting, reports were made by Minister of the Interior Nikolai Avksentiev, Minister of Trade and Industry Sergey Prokopovich, Deputy Minister Chairman and Minister of Finance Nikolai Nekrasov.

The debate was attended by 84 people.

The main events of the Conference were the speeches of Alexander Kerensky, Nikolai Chkheidze, Supreme Commander-in-Chief Lavr Kornilov, Alexei Kaledin. Mikhail Alekseev, Ekaterina Breshko-Breshkovskaya, Alexander Guchkov, Ivan Ilyin, Peter Kropotkin, Vasily Maklakov, Pavel Milyukov, Vladimir Nabokov, Georgy Plekhanov, Mikhail Rodzianko, Pavel Ryabushinsky, David Ryazanov, Sergey Salazkin, Irakli Tsereteli, Vasily Shulgin, Vadim Rudnev also spoke at the meeting.

At the meeting, a split occurred between moderate and revolutionary groups. In the speeches of Lavr Kornilov, Alexei Kaledin, Pavel Milyukov, Vasily Shulgin and others, the following program was formulated: the liquidation of the Soviets, the abolition of public organizations in the army, the war to the bitter end, the restoration of the death penalty, harsh discipline in the army and in the rear – in factories. In particular, General Aleksey Kaledin, delegated to the Conference from the Cossacks, noted that in a terrible hour of difficult trials at the front and in the rear, from complete political and economic collapse and ruin, from destruction a country can only be saved by really firm power, not connected by narrow-party group interests, free from the need, after every step, to look at all kinds of committees and councils, and aware of the fact that the source of sovereign state power is the will of the whole people, and not an individual parties or groups.

At the same time, for example, Pavel Ryabushinsky said that Russia is governed by a dream, ignorance and demagogy.

Alexander Kerensky, summing up the meeting, said that its significance was that representatives of all classes, parties and nationalities of Russia openly expressed their opinion on the measures that are needed to save the state; a greater understanding has been reached in society; the interim government will try to implement all the proposals aimed at reconciliation and unification of the country; the government proceeds from the fact that the conference spoke in favor of continuing the war, maintaining loyalty to the allies, in connection with which the most important are the issues of strengthening the army, as well as the revival and strengthening of financial and economic life.

No documents (resolutions, etc.) were adopted at the meeting.

Some of the Moscow workers, organized by revolutionary political forces, in connection with the Conference, declared a one-day general strike on the day of its beginning, in which more than 400 thousand people took part.

The meeting received a negative assessment in Soviet historiography as a 'conspiracy of counter-revolutionary forces' for the preparation of the Kornilov affair (with the idea that it had been a result of a planned coup by the former).

Conference participants in the drawings by Yuri Artsybushev (Kerensky, Milyukov, Chkheidze, Kornilov)
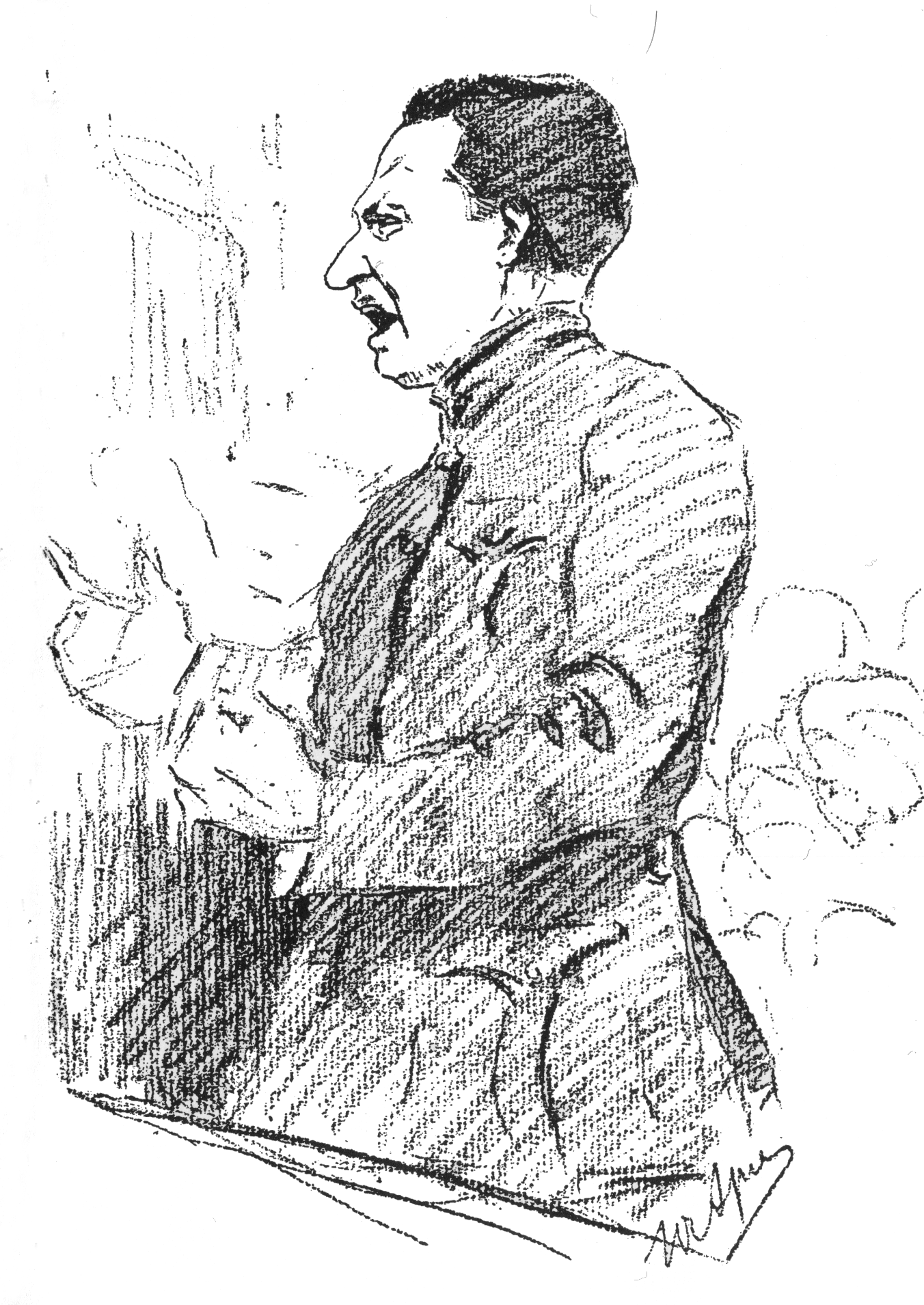

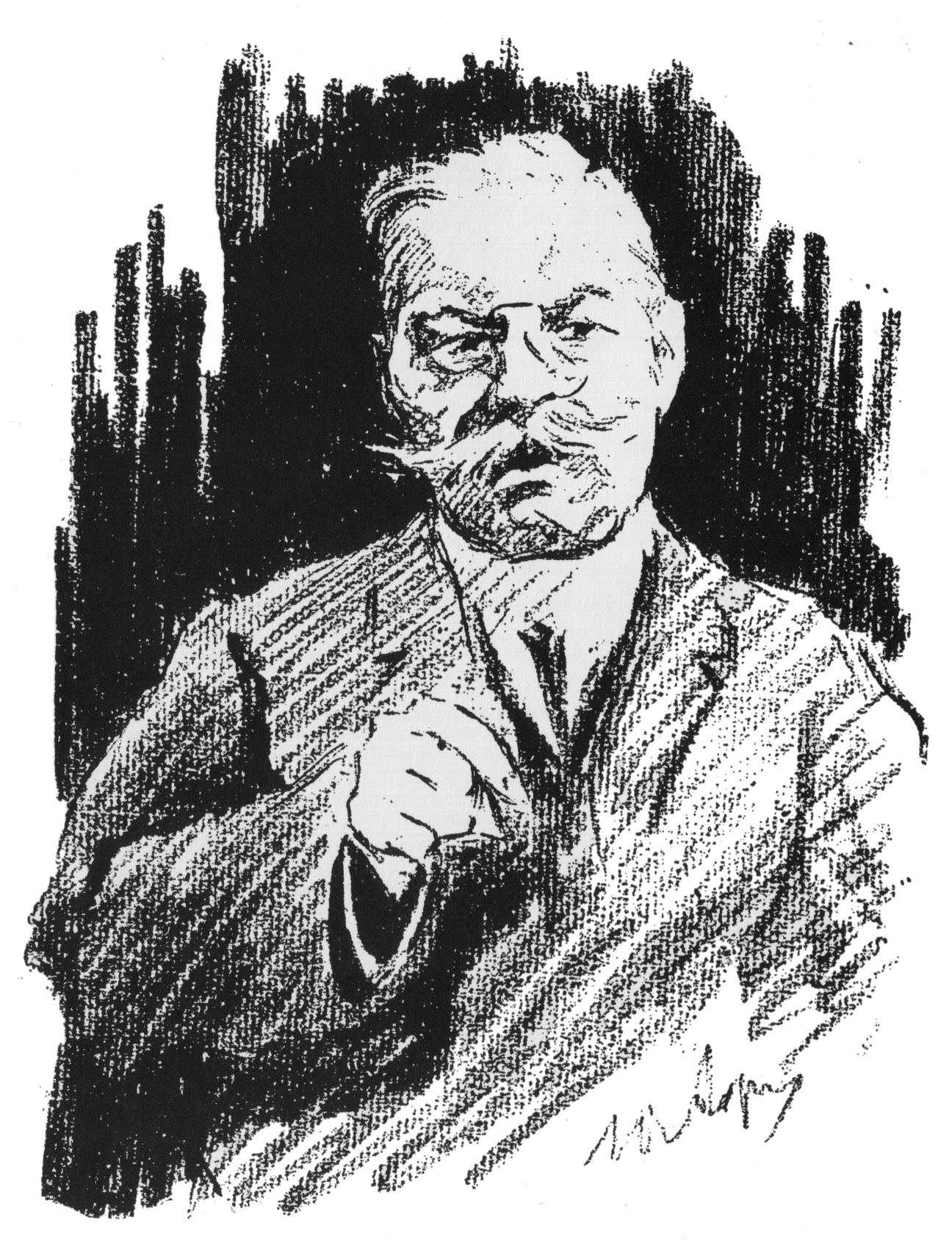

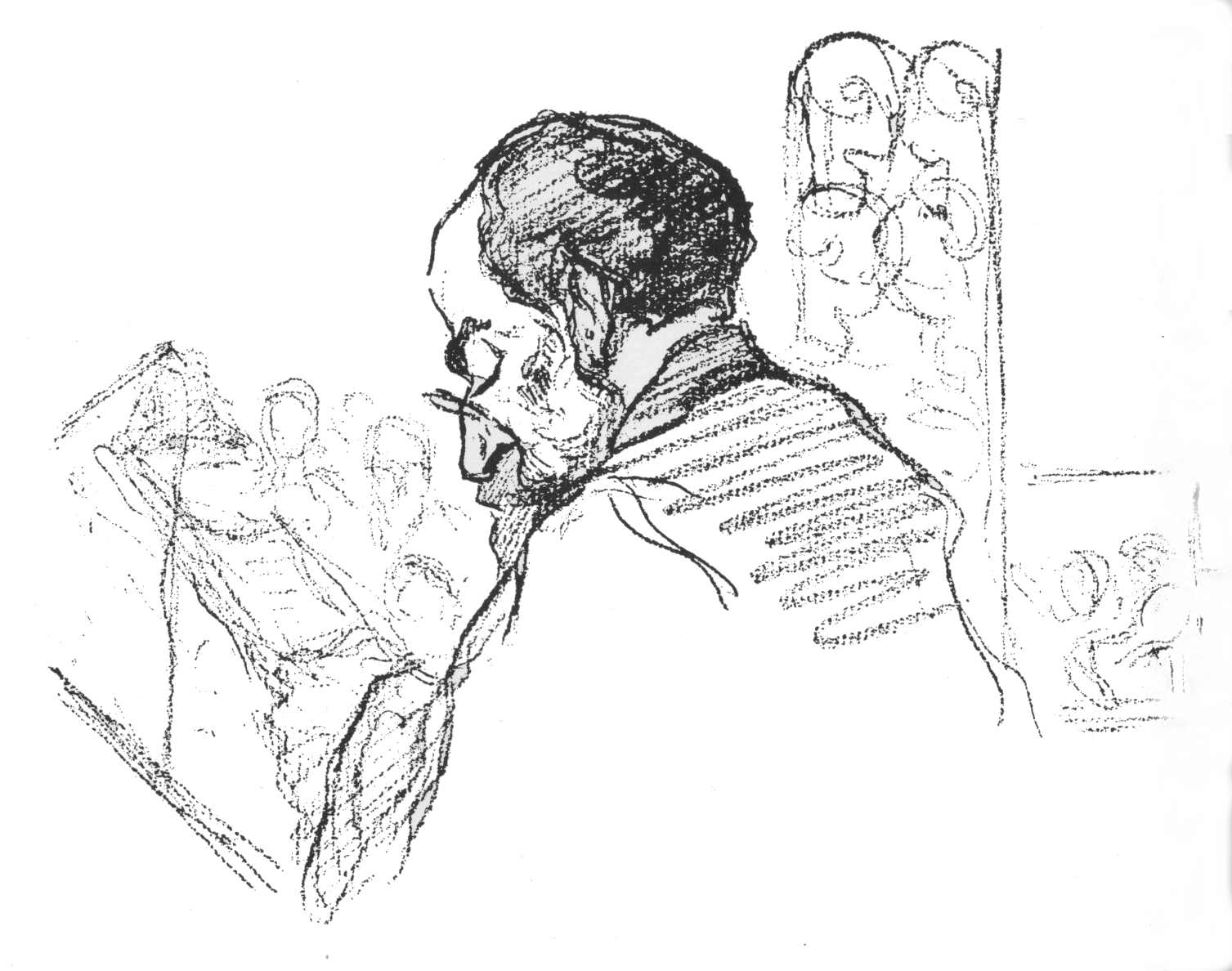

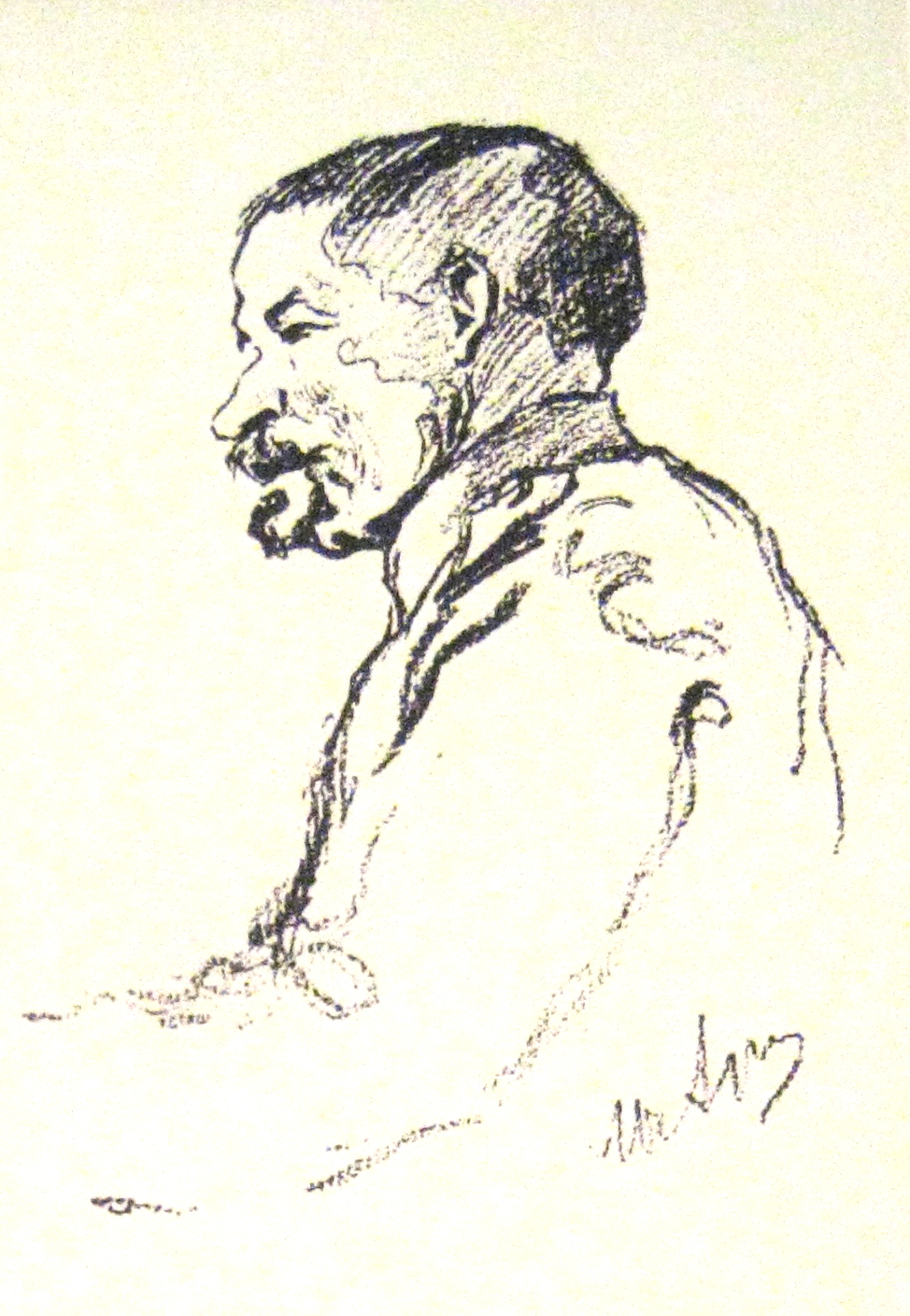

== See also ==
- All-Russian Democratic Conference
- Provisional Council of the Russian Republic
- State Meeting in Ufa

== Sources ==
- State Meeting // Great Russian Encyclopedia: in 35 Volumes / Editor-in-Chief Yuri Osipov – Moscow: Great Russian Encyclopedia, 2004–2017
- State Meeting on August 12 – 15, 1917. Verbatim Report / Central Archive of the October Revolution; Chairman Yakov Yakovlev. Moscow; Leningrad: State Publishing House, 1930. 425 Pages
- Vladimir Lenin. Rumors of a Conspiracy. Complete Works, 5th Edition. Volume 34
- Protocols of the Central Committee of the Russian Social Democratic Labor Party (Bolsheviks). August 1917 – February 1918, Moscow, 1958
- The Revolutionary Movement in Russia in August 1917. The Defeat of the Kornilov Rebellion. Documents and Materials, Moscow, 1959
