= All-Russian Democratic Conference =

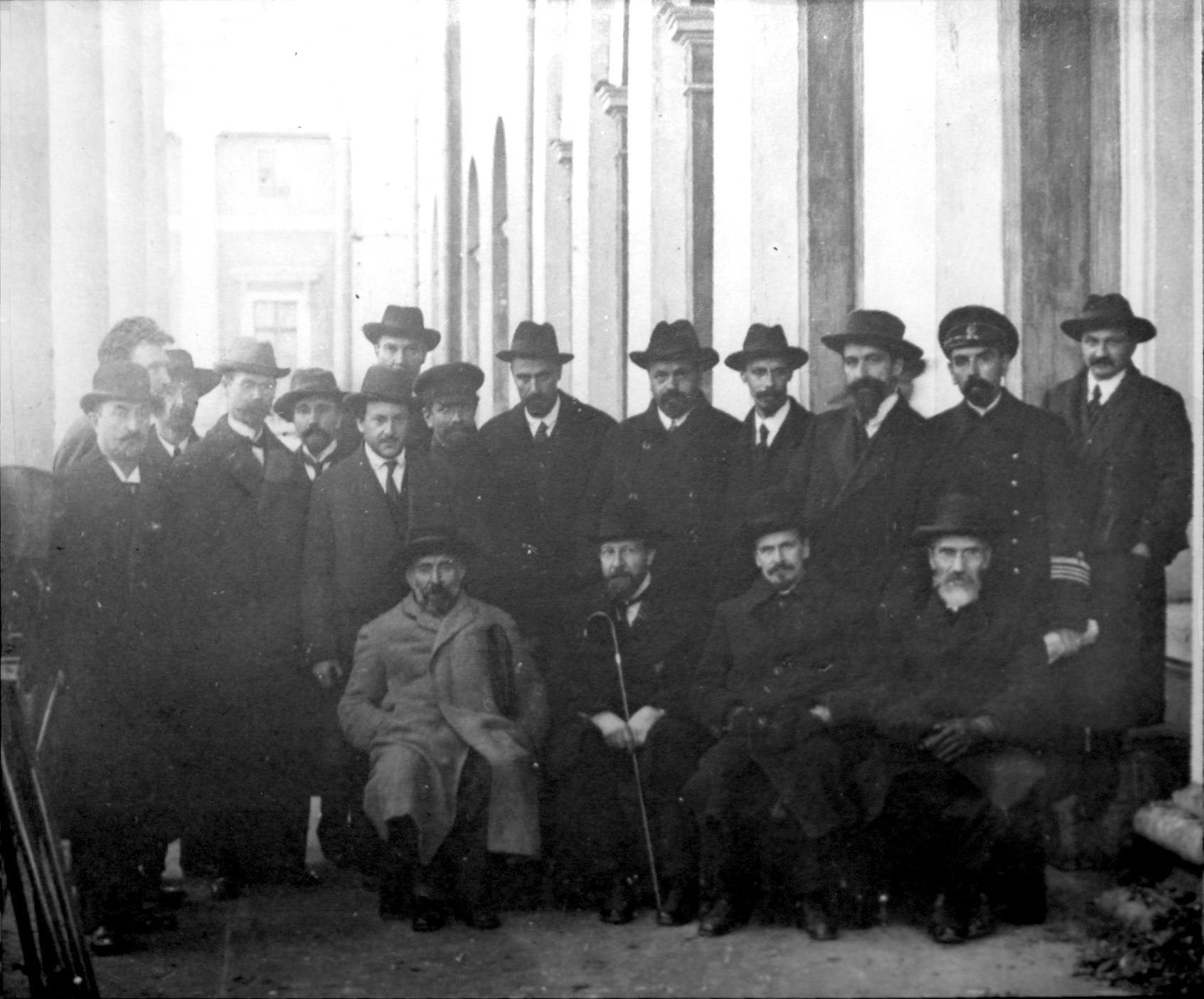
Presidium of the All-Russian Democratic Conference (Petrograd, Alexandrinsky Theater, September 27 – October 5, 1917)

The All-Russian Democratic Conference (Democratic Conference) was a meeting of representatives of political parties and public organizations, held in Petrograd from September 27 to October 5, 1917. The outcome of the meeting was the creation of the Pre-Parliament.

== Background ==
The decision to convene a Democratic Conference, as opposed to the Moscow State Conference, was taken at a joint meeting of the Central Executive Committee of the Soviets of Workers' and Soldiers' Deputies and the executive committee of the All-Russian Council of Peasant Deputies on September 3, 1917. The immediate impetus was the Rebellion of Lavr Kornilov and the collapse of the next government coalition, provoked by him; in a telegram inviting representatives of parties and public organizations to take part in the meeting, signed by the chairmen of the Central Executive Committees Nikolay Chkheidze and Nikolai Avksentiev, it was said about "convening in Petrograd a congress of the entire organized Democracy of Russia to create a strong revolutionary power capable of uniting all revolutionary Russia to repulse external enemies and to suppress all attempts at conquered freedom". The opening of the meeting was scheduled for September 25, 1917.

The purpose of the meeting, one of its initiators, Fedor Dan, a member of the Central Executive Committee of the Council of Workers' and Soldiers' Deputies, explained as follows:

The idea of the Democratic Conference, convened after and in contrast to the National Conference in Moscow, was connected in the minds of its initiators with the consciousness of the need to form a homogeneous democratic government to replace a coalition government, a government with representatives of the bourgeoisie, which clearly began to fall apart after the notorious June offensive at the front and received a mortal wound in days of the Kornilov uprising. I do not pretend to say that all the leading members of the Central Executive Committee looked at the tasks of the Democratic Conference just like that, but I can categorically say that the most prominent members of the Central Executive Committee looked at them that way, and that was exactly my own point of view... The idea that guided us in convening the Democratic Conference was to try to create a democratic government based not only on those elements of revolutionary democracy, in the close sense of the word, which were concentrated in the Soviets, but also on those that had a solid base in cooperatives and local governments (city councils and zemstvos)... We were encouraged by the successes in rapprochement with this "non-Soviet" democracy, achieved at the State Conference in Moscow: as you know, after long disputes and wrangles, both cooperators and democratic representatives of zemstvos and cities signed a political and economic platform drawn up by the delegation of the Central Executive Committee and announced by Chkheidze on behalf of all democracy at a meeting of the Conference on August 14.

Indeed, not everyone understood the purpose of the Conference as Dan did: his party comrade, Irakli Tsereteli, at the Conference itself, argued that a "homogeneous democratic government" would not be viable. He also formulated another task for this forum: to create a representative body to which the Provisional Government would report until the Constituent Assembly.

The Tsereteli initiative was viewed by the right and the left very differently. The leader of the Party of Constitutional Democrats Pavel Milyukov wrote: "In this way, the Democratic Conference became higher than the government, which was made responsible to it. But this was precisely the very thing that the Bolsheviks strove for when they wanted to transfer "all power to the soviets". Tsereteli's idea was essentially a complete surrender to the plans of Lenin and Trotsky". "Quite the opposite", protested Leon Trotsky, "Tsereteli's idea was to paralyze the Bolshevik struggle for Soviet power. The Compromisers created a new base for themselves, trying to crush the Soviets with an artificial combination of all kinds of organizations. Democrats distributed their votes at their discretion, guided by one concern: to secure an undeniable majority".

== Composition ==
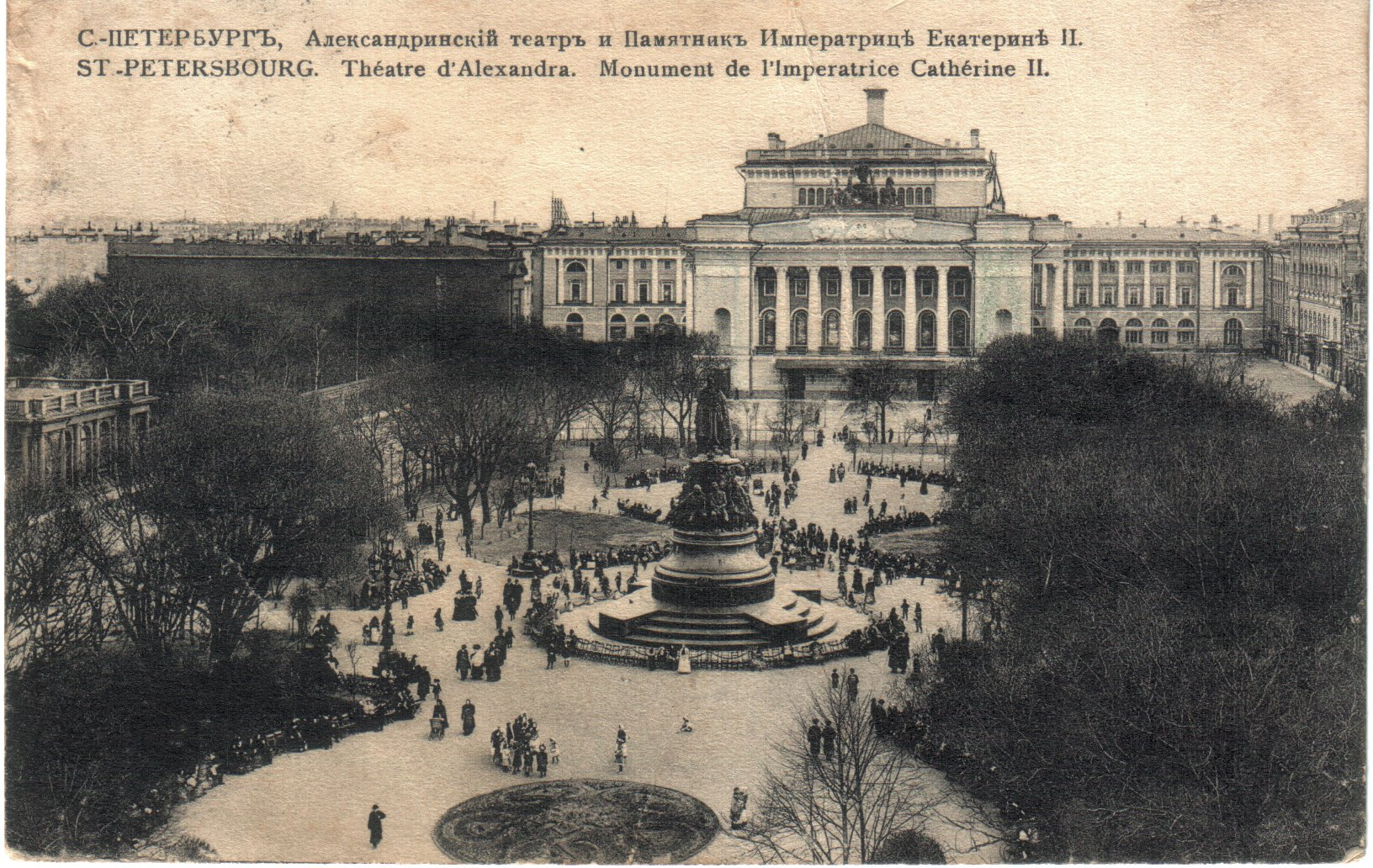
Alexandrinsky Theater on a postcard of 1917

The meeting, scheduled for September 25, opened at the Alexandrinsky Theater late, on September 27, 1917, when more than 1,000 delegates gathered. In total, according to Izvestia, 1582 delegates participated in the Democratic Conference, including: from the Soviets of Workers' and Soldiers' Deputies – 230, from the Soviets of Peasants' Deputies – 230, from trade unions – 100, from city governments – 300, from zemstvos – 200, from organizations of the army and navy – 125, from general cooperation – 120, from national organizations – 60, from working cooperation – 38, from Cossack organizations – 35, from economic organizations – 33, from the Union of Railway Workers – 27, from commercial and industrial employees – 20, from zemstvo commissions – 20, from food committees – 17, from the Teachers' Union – 15, from the Postal and Telegraph Union – 12, from paramedics – 5 and 1–2 delegates from the Union of Women's Democratic Organizations and the Union of Crippled Warriors, etc. (Izvestia, 1917, September 8 and 10, 1917). Of the political parties, the Socialist Revolutionaries had the largest representation – 532 (Izvestia had not yet divided them into right and left), 172 were Mensheviks, 136 were Bolsheviks, 55 were Trudoviks (Representatives of the Labor Socialist Party), 23 were Ukrainian Social Revolutionaries, Bundists – 15, representatives of other national socialist parties – 28; another 400 delegates signed up as non-partisan (Izvestia, September 14 and 17, 1917).

Among the invited were also the Ministers of the Provisional Government (Alexei Nikitin, Alexander Verkhovsky, Dmitry Verderevsky, Kuzma Gvozdev) and members of the diplomatic corps from the Allied powers.

== Decisions ==
On the main issue, on the composition of the government – whether it should be homogeneous democratic or coalitional and what the coalition should be, with or without Constitutional Democrats (who were accused of sympathy and aiding Kornilov) – it was not possible to agree: conflicting votes on this issue eventually nullified them. On the one hand, the majority voted for a coalition with the bourgeoisie; on the other hand, the majority voted for a coalition without Constitutional Democrats, the main bourgeois party and the only truly influential. The "Directory", temporarily replacing the disintegrated government, could only guess with whom it should create a coalition approved by the majority of the Conference.

Ultimately, the statements of Tsereteli and Kerensky led to the adoption of a resolution on the admissibility of a coalition with Constitutional Democrats. In protest, the Bolsheviks left the meeting hall and began to develop plans to eliminate the "provisional power" and transfer it to the Soviets by establishing the dictatorship of the proletariat.

The second fundamental issue on the agenda of the Democratic meeting concerned the creation of a representative body – the so-called Pre-Parliament (All-Russian Democratic Council).

The draft resolution supported the idea of creating a Pre-Parliament and approved the participation of Constitutional Democrats in this body, pointed out the need to ensure the prevailing influence of representatives of democratic parties in it. The draft resolution also referred to the accountability of the Provisional Government to the Pre-Parliament.

The intended appointment of the Pre-Parliament during the discussion has changed: the accountability of the government to the Pre-Parliament has disappeared from the final resolution, and as a result, it has become a kind of mission designed to authorize the creation of the government, and later serve as an advisory body to it. The government later substantially changed the composition of the Pre-Parliament.

The attitude to the Pre-Parliament, even during the period of the Democratic Conference, divided the Bolsheviks into "right" and "left": the former, headed by Lev Kamenev, looked for opportunities for the peaceful development of the revolution in it; the second, led by Leon Trotsky, believed that this representation, selected from above, not reflecting the real balance of power, was intended to replace the actual will of the people, to create support for a government that was unable to carry out the necessary reforms and did not want to end the war, and the participation of the Bolsheviks in the Pre-Parliament would not nothing but the support of the Provisional Government.

On October 3, 1917, at the meeting of the Presidium of the Democratic Conference, the All-Russian Democratic Council (Pre-Parliament) was formed, in which the Bolsheviks (after increasing its composition by the Provisional Government at the expense of representatives of the so-called "qualified" organizations and institutions – the party of Constitutional Democrats, trade and industrial associations, etc. ) received only 58 seats out of 555.

In the Central Committee of the Russian Social Democratic Labor Party (Bolsheviks), the votes regarding participation in the work of the Pre-Parliament were divided approximately equally; on October 3, 1917, the question was put to the decision of the Bolshevik faction in the Democratic Conference with the participation of members of the Petrograd Committee of the Russian Social Democratic Labor Party (Bolsheviks), where the supporters of the boycott of the Pre-Parliament were in the minority (50 against 77). However, the balance of power changed after Trotsky was supported by Vladimir Lenin, who was hiding in the underground (the leader of the Bolsheviks learned that the issue of boycott was discussed only on October 6, 1917). Lenin stated that "the [Pre-Parliament's] sole purpose is to distract the workers and peasants from the growing revolution", and on October 12, 1917 called the decision of the Bolsheviks to participate in its work "a shameful" and a "blatant mistake".

On October 20, 1917, on the day of the opening of the Pre-Parliament, Trotsky, on behalf of the Bolshevik faction, announced a declaration explaining why the Bolsheviks did not consider it possible to participate in this enterprise. He stated that "...a power has been created in which and around the explicit and secret Kornilovites play a leading role ... The qualifying elements have entered the Provisional Council in such numbers that, as all elections in the country show, they do not have the right ... With this government of high treason ... we have nothing in common ... long live the immediate, honest democratic peace, all power to the Soviets, all land to the people, long live the Constituent Assembly!".

Thus, the final result of the work of the Democratic Conference was the creation of a new centrist coalition government, on the one hand, and the creation of the Pre-Parliament boycotted by the Bolsheviks, on the other.

At the same time, the powers of both the Democratic Conference itself and the Pre-Parliament created by it caused great doubts both among the right (Constitutional Democrats and all who were more right than Constitutional Democrats) and the left (Bolsheviks, left Socialist Revolutionaries, left Mensheviks). The initiators themselves, right-wing socialists, did not receive satisfaction from the decisions it made. In particular, Fedor Dan wrote:

...the Democratic Government has not come out of the Democratic Conference. Moreover. From the very beginning, the official representatives of the Central Executive Committee had to abandon the line of unconditional rupture of the coalition and the establishment of a purely democratic power at the Conference, but only to advocate for the development of a platform from which all groups ready to implement the platform could participate in government. I personally was not particularly enthusiastic about this kind of policy after so many wonderful "platforms" had been written since the formation of the first coalition government without any decisive result in terms of implementing what was most essential in these "platforms"...

The main reason for the failure was the position taken by groups of "non-Soviet" democracy. During a detailed discussion of the situation with representatives of these groups, it turned out that they look at the program declaration signed in Moscow somewhat differently than I and a significant number of my closest comrades in the Central Executive Committee...

...As a result of the Democratic Conference, we did not even get a coalition government, but some kind of coalition scumbag: not a single prominent leader of the socialist parties participated in the government; but also the "capitalist ministers" did not belong to the leading bourgeois parties, but were entirely "wild".

== Sources ==
- The Democratic Conference of 1917 // Great Russian Encyclopedia: in 35 Volumes / Editor-in-Chief Yuri Osipov – Moscow: Great Russian Encyclopedia, 2004–2017
- Svetlana Rudneva (2000). Democratic Conference (September 1917): History of the Forum. Moscow: The Science. p. 256. ISBN 5-02-010200-8.
