= Army Committees =

The Army Committees (Russian: Арме́йские комите́ты) sometimes called the Soldiers' Committees (Russian: Солдатские комитеты) were the highest elected political organizations in the Russian army that emerged in 1917.

== General information ==
The army committees directed the activities of the military committees that arose during the February Revolution of 1917. In the troops, they performed the functions of the Soviets. They were elected in private at the general meeting of the unit after the release on March 14, 1917 of order No. 1 of the Petrograd Soviet of Workers' and Soldiers' Deputies.

Army committees were given the right to manage the work of military committees of the army, to conduct investigations within the entire army area within their competence, for which "flying" detachments were created, to issue resolutions on specific issues that are not of a general nature.

== Organizational structure ==
The High Command and the Headquarters of the Supreme High Command, seeking to establish their control over the committees, ordered the introduction of officers' representatives into them. By order of the Supreme High Command of General Mikhail Alekseev dated April 12, 1917, a "Temporary Regulation on the Organization of Ranks of the Active Army and Navy" was introduced. In accordance with it, army committees were elected from representatives of divisional committees (one officer for 2 soldiers) at the army congress. For the current work, the army committees formed councils of army committees with 25% of their members. To resolve important issues, the council convened a full committee.

The army committees were dominated by representatives of the Mensheviks and Socialist Revolutionaries. In the fall of 1917, after the re-elections, their Bolshevization began.

== Sources ==
- The Revolutionary Movement in the Russian Army, February 27 – October 24, 1917: Collection of Documents. Moscow, 1968
- Victor Miller. Soldiers' Committees of the Russian Army in 1917. Moscow, 1974
- Leonard Gavrilov. Soldiers' Committees in the October Revolution. Moscow, 1983
- Oksana Schus. Army Committees // Encyclopedia of the History of Ukraine: In 10 Volumes / Editorial Team: Valery Smoliy (Chairman) and Others; Institute of History of Ukraine, National Academy of Sciences of Ukraine – Kiev: Scientific Opinion, 2003 – Volume 1: A – B – 688 Pages: Illustrations – ISBN 966-00-0734-5
