= Fourth All-Russian Congress of the Party of Left Socialist-Revolutionaries (internationalists) =

Political event in Russia

The Fourth All-Russian Congress of the Party of Left Socialist-Revolutionaries (internationalists) (Russian: 4-й Всероссийский съезд партии левых социалистов-революционеров (интернационалистов)) was held in Moscow, Soviet Russia from October 2 to 7, 1918. It would be the last party congress of the Left Socialist-Revolutionaries before their party disintegrated. At the time of the 4th party congress, the PLSR(i) was badly weakened by the backlash following their failed July 6, 1918, armed plot. The main leader of the party Maria Spiridonova was in jail at the time but addressed the gathering by a written letter.

== Background ==
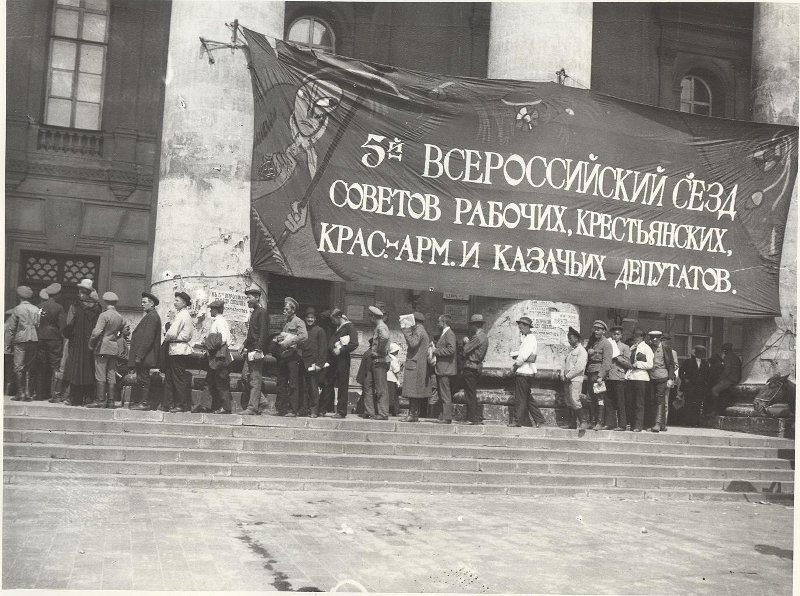
Bolshoi Theatre during the Fifth All–Russian Congress of Soviets

In the wake of the March 3, 1918, Treaty of Brest-Litvosk, the PLSR(i) had been expanding their organization (the party membership grew from about 60,000 to about 100,000 between April and June 1918). The party was seeking to gain a majority of delegates at the July 1918 Fifth All–Russian Congress of Soviets, and through a Soviet Congress majority they would break the Brest-Litovsk treaty and launch a campaign of revolutionary warfare against Germany. But a last-minute decision from the Bolshevik side to allow representation of the Committees of Poor Peasants (Kombed) at the Soviet Congress, with the holding of a Kombed congress in Petrograd on July 3, 1918, which resolved that peasants from localities that had not been purged of kulaks would be represented by the Kombed delegates rather than local Soviet delegates, ensured a Bolshevik majority at the Soviet Congress. With no chance of gaining power in Soviet Russia through the ballots, the PLSR(i) resorted to terrorism. On July 6, 1918, the PLSR(i) staged an armed revolt, notably assassinating the German ambassador Count Wilhelm von Mirbach (hoping to provoke a resumption of the war with Germany).

The revolt had taken much of the party organization by surprise. Some 40% of the PLSR(i) delegates at the Fifth All–Russian Congress of Soviets (which had opened on July 4, 1918) rejected the uprising. The Governorate-level Party Organizations of Saratov, Astrakhan, Penza and Tver as well as 14 Uyezd-Level Party Organizations rejected the July 6, 1918, revolt. The Saratov City Party Organization along with some PLSR(i) Central Committee members sought cooperation with the Bolsheviks, which held to a split in the PLSR(i) and the emergence of the break-away pro-Bolshevik Party of Revolutionary Communism. The Western Regional Committee of the PLSR(i) rejected the July 6, 1918, actions as an anti-Soviet move by 'adventurers' with counter-revolutionary intentions. But the majority of the party organizations and members that remained in PSLR(i) stood by the party Central Committee – a First Party Council of the PSLR(i) held in early August 1918 endorsed the killing of Count Mirbach.

By October 1918 the PLSR(i) was badly weakened after the failed July 6 revolt. At the 4th party congress, it was estimated that the party had lost two-thirds of its membership since July 1918.

== Delegations ==
The 4th party congress was a numerically smaller gathering than the 3rd party congress – at the 3rd party congress there were 215 delegates with decisive vote. Per the report of the 4th party congress credentials commission, as of October 4, 1918 there 90 delegates with decisive vote present as well as 58 delegates with advisory vote. The 90 delegates with decisive voting rights consisted of 5 representatives of the Regional Committees ('obkom' – Moscow, Western, North-Western and South-Western), 46 delegates from 26 Governorate-level organizations, 38 delegates from Uyezd- or City-level organizations and 1 representative of the Ukrainian Party of Left Socialist-Revolutionaries.

The governorate-level delegations included delegates from Cherepovets Governorate, Chernigov Governorate, Kazan Governorate, Kaluga Governorate, Kostroma Governorate, Kharkov Governorate, Kursk Governorate, Nizhny Novgorod Governorate, Novgorod Governorate, Olonets Governorate, Penza Governorate, Pskov Governorate, Ryazan Governorate, Smolensk Governorate, Tambov Governorate, Tula Governorate, Vitebsk Governorate, Vologda Governorate and Yaroslavl Governorate

The other party delegations present included representatives from Vladimirsky Uyezd, Likhvinsky Uyezd, Nevelsky Uyezd, Petergofsky Uyezd, Voronezhsky Uyezd, Dmitriyevsky Uyezd, Mglinsky Uyezd, Moskovsky Uyezd, Yepifansky Uyezd, Vyshnevolotsky Uyezd, Dorogobuzhsky Uyezd, Ostashkovsky Uyezd, Valuysky Uyezd, Belyovsky Uyezd, Novotorzhsky Uyezd, Yekaterinodarsky Otdel, Taganrog Organization, Occupied Gomel Area, Lithuania, Livny, Bogoroditsk, Vyazniki, Kaliazin, Stary Oskol, Vitebsk, Kronstadt, Pyatigorsk, Vologda, Aleksin, Yaroslavl and the Party Organization at the Northern Railway and the Central Bureau of All Railway Organizations.

Ilya Bakkal (who had been one of the leaders of the PLSR(i) faction at the 3rd and 4th convocations of the All-Russian Central Executive Committee), when presenting the credentials commission report, argued that in spite of the extraordinary conditions the PLSR(i) was undergoing only 3 delegate mandates had been questioned and out of those two mandates were later recognized. Per Spiridonova she had received a report from the 4th party congress credentials committee dated October 6, 1918 which had recognized 107 delegates with decisive voting rights.

== Reports from the party organizations ==
Bakkal held the opening address at the 4th party congress. A party congress presidium consisting of Bakkal, Ilya Mayorov and Yacov Bogachev was elected. Then the gathering would listen to accounts from delegates about the context of the party in their respective areas. These accounts largely detailed difficulties faced by local party organizations in the aftermath of the July 6, 1918 uprising;

Governorate	Delegate account at the 4th PLSR(i) congress
Astrakhan Governorate	Manuilov, a PLSR(i) member from the Astrakhan Governorate who happened to be on a business trip to Moscow, addressed the gathering. He stated that the PLSR(i) organization in Astrakhan Governorate had been unaware of the convocation to the party congress. Manuilov stated that PLSR(i) had continued to operate legally and head some departments of the Astrakhan Governorate Executive Committee of Soviets, although there situation was tense following the assassination of Count Mirbach. He claimed that the peasantry supported PLSR(i) whilst the workers supported the Bolsheviks.
Cherepovets Governorate	A delegate from Cherepovets Governorate (name unknown) stated that PLSR(i) had been arrested in the Governorate after the July 6 uprising. As of October 1918 some 200 party members remained in the Governorate. The Cherepovets City Party Organization and the Cherepovetsky Uyezd Party Organization had become clandestine organizations, whilst the party retained a legal faction in the Cherepovets Governorate Soviet. The Kirillovsky Uyezd Party Organization and the Belozersky Uyezd Party Organization operated in a semi-legal fashion. In other uyezds there was no organized presence of the party.
Kaluga Governorate	Alexandrov, a delegate from Kaluga Governorate, described party work in the governorate as 'decent'. On September 22, 1918 a PLSR(i) party conference was held, which had reaffirmed the line of armed struggle against the Bolsheviks. PLSR(i) meetings were being dispersed by force. Parallel legal and underground party organizations were set up. A peasants uprising took place in Zhizdrinsky Uyezd in the aftermath of the July 6 uprising. Alexandrov stated that the peasantry remained populist, not Marxist.
Kostroma Governorate	A delegate from Kostroma Governorate (name unknown) stated that before July 6 uprising 20 out of 44 members of Governorate Soviet belonged to PLSR(i), but after the July 6 uprising they were expelled from the soviet. He stated that the party was organizationally weak in Kostroma Governorate.
Kursk Governorate	Alexander Baryshnikov, a delegate from the Kursk Governorate, stated that before the July 6 uprising the PLSR(i) held 17 out of 45 seats in the Kursk Governorate Executive Committee of Soviets, and that the party had 2 out of 4 seats in its Presidium. The Bolsheviks and PLSR(i) had agreed on alternating the post of chairman. In the majority of the uyezd executive committees were either under the control of the PLSR(i) or with a strong presence of the party. This situation had, however, weakened the party organizational work as much energy was invested into work within the executive committees of Soviet governance. In the aftermath of the July 6 uprising the PLSR(i) representatives were expelled from the Kursk Governorate Executive Committee. Some leaders of the party were arrested whilst others went underground. The Kursky Uyezd Land Congress took place in August 1918, with a significant majority of PLSR(i) members among the delegates. After the Land Congress the Bolsheviks ordered the arrest of the PLSR(i) majority faction in the Kursky Uyezd Executive Committee of Soviets. Furthermore on August 22, 1918 the Kursky Uyezd Congress of Soviets convened, at which PLSR(i) held a majority of delegates. The gathering was dispersed by the Bolsheviks. Other Uyezd-level Congresses of Soviets were PLSR(i) held a majority of delegates were Korochansky Uyezd, Dmitriyevsky Uyezd and Lgovsky Uyezd. At the Korochansky Uyezd Congress of Soviets the gathering was about to issue a greeting to the jailed PLSR(i) leader Spiridonova when the meeting was broken up by force and attendees arrested (Baryshnikov stated that he himself had managed to escape arrest). The Dmitriyevsky Uyezd Executive Committee elected at the congress was dispersed, and its functions were overtaken by a Bolshevik-led Military Revolutionary Committee. At the Lgovsky Uyezd Congress of Soviets, 384 out of 500 delegates belonged to PLSR(i). A PLSR(i)-dominated Lgovsky Uyezd Executive Committee was elected, but the PLSR(i) members of this committee were arrested the following day. A new Lgovsky Uyezd Executive Committee was constituted with 14 Bolsheviks and 8 PLSR(i) members.
Moscow Governorate	Lebedev, a delegate from the Moscow Governorate, argued that the decline of the party had been particularly severe among intellectuals. The Moscow City Raion Party Organization had some 200 members before the July uprising, almost solely constituted by intellectuals. Now not even a dozen of the intellectuals remained. Another Moscow Governorate delegate, Bogachev, echoed Lebedev's statement arguing that the small local party organization in Moscow City had now switched sides to the Bolsheviks.
Nizhny Novgorod Governorate	In contrast to many other interventions Mitropolsky, a delegate from Nizhny Novgorod Governorate, reported that the party was operating legally in the governorate and that they were running the Nizhny Novgorod Governorate Executive Committee of Soviets. He stated that the position of the party in the governorate was improving but flagged that the public opinion in the rural areas was turning counter-revolutionary as a result of food shortages.
Novgorod Governorate	Balakhin, a delegate from Novgorod Governorate, stated that party members had been arrested and that he himself had escaped arrest. All party organizations in Novgorod Governorate were now defunct except the Staraya Russa Party Organization (which included the chairman of the City Executive Committee of Soviets Lebedev and the Food Commissar Bogachev), but that the Staraya Russia Party Organization was sympathetic to the Kolegayev line.
Olonets Governorate	Glybin, a delegate from Olonets Governorate, stated that the party members now worked in semi-underground situation, and that only about 50 party members remained in Petrozavodsk. Before July 6 uprising the PLSR(i) held a majority in at the Olonets Governorate Peasants Congress and the Olonets Governorate Executive Committee of Soviets had a PLSR(i) majority and its chairman belonged to the party. During the July 6 uprising the PLSR(i) leadership had demanded that the Petrozavodsk Left Socialist-Revolutionary combat group take action, but the Olonets Party Organization had abstained from taking part in the rebellion. After the July 6 uprising the Bolsheviks pressured the PLSR(i) to hand over control over the Olonets Governorate Executive Committee.
Oryol Governorate	Nikitin, a delegate from Oryol Governorate, stated that in parallel to the July 6 uprising the Third Congress of Soviets of Oryol Governorate was being held. At the gathering there had been some 150 Bolsheviks and 140 PLSR(i) delegates. When news of the July 6 uprising broke, the PLSR(i) delegates barricaded themselves overnight at their party office. On the fourth day Bolsheviks armed with machine guns surrounded the PLSR(i) office building and exhorted the PLSR(i) delegates to denounce their Central Committee. The congress then elected an Oryol Governorate Executive Committee of Soviets with 13 Bolsheviks and 11 PLSR(i) representatives. On August 28, 1918 four PLSR(i) Executive Committee members were arrested. The PLSR(i) responded by conducting counter-arrests of Bolsheviks and managed to secure the release of the prisoners. On September 5, 1918 there was a larger crack-down on the party, only a few cadres remained free. Nikitin claimed that as of October 1918 some 70 PLSR(i) party members remained active across 9 uyezds.
Penza Governorate	Lapshin, a delegate from Penza Governorate, recalled that before July 6 uprising the elections to the Penza Governorate Congress of Soviets had produced a PLSR(i) majority. After the July 6 uprising there was an unsuccessful attempt to expel the PSLR(i) faction from the Governorate Soviet. Then an armed detachment of 40 men had been sent from Moscow to block the PSLR(i) representatives from taking part in the meetings of the Presidium of the Central Executive Committee of Soviets. The PSLR(i) then had held a party meeting, endorsing terrorist methods against the Bolsheviks. Laphsin recalled that after this meeting party members were arrested but later released.
Petrograd Governorate	A delegate from the Petrograd Governorate (name unknown) stated that party organizations existed across the governorate, but that the PLSR(i) members had been expelled from executive committees and that the party was being persecuted. There had been bloodshed in localities were peasants had taken up arms to defend their PLSR(i) soviet deputies. The largest PLSR(i) party organization, in Oranienbaum, had been dismantled. In Kronstadt the local soviet (where Maximalists and PLSR(i) held a majority) was dispersed and new elections were held. However even after the new elections the Maximalists and PLSR(i) won a two-thirds majority in the soviet.
Pskov Governorate	A. V. Panyuntina, delegate from Pskov Governorate, recalled that before the July 6 uprising a governorate-level peasants congress had been held, with the PLSR(i) holding 75% of the delegates. The party had some 500 members before July 6 uprising, but now most were arrested. Some 150–300 PLSR(i) sympathizers remained in the governorate.
Pyatigorsk	Popov, a delegate from Pyatigorsk, stated that the party had 150 members locally and claimed the party had a strong influence among workers and peasants. According to Popov the Pyatigorsk Party Organization had learnt of the July 6 uprising weeks almost 3 weeks later. Furthermore he stated that the Pyatigorsk Party Organization controlled a 800-man combat force engaged in struggles with Austro-German occupation forces. He also claimed that there were 18 Left Socialist combat organizations engaged in struggles in the Don Region and Yekaterinodar.
Railways	Stamo, a delegate of the Central Railway Party Organization, stated that after the July 6 uprising the bureau of the PLSR(i) faction in the All-Russian Executive Committee of Railway Workers (Vikzhedor) was arrested. In response a PLSR(i) detachment carried out counter-arrests. In Vikzhedor there were 37 Bolsheviks, 17 PLSR(i) and 4 Menshevik-Internationalists. Another delegate, representing the Northern Railway organization (name not recorded), stated that some 400 Left Socialist-Revolutionaries remained in their organization, and that the 'Kolegayevites' were rejected as opportunists by the members of the organization.
Smolensk Governorate	Polyachenok, a delegate from Smolensk Governorate, described a chaotic situation in which it was difficult to know the exact status of the party and that ahead of the party congress there had been difficulties to contact party organizations to know whom were still loyal to the PLSR(i) Central Committee after the July 6 uprising. Polyachenok recalled that the party work in the governorate was paralyzed, with widespread arrests of PLSR(i) activists. Two uyezd-level party organizations (Vyazemsky Uyezd Party Organization and Roslavlsky Uyezd Party Organization) seemed to have sided with Kolegayev. One party organization leader had reportedly joined the Bolsheviks whilst another had absconded with 235,000 rubles.
Tambov Governorate	Evgeniev, a delegate of Tambov Governorate, stated that after the July 6 uprising a governorate-level PLSR(i) party conference had declared its full support for the assassination of Count Mirbach and called for the release of jailed PLSR(i) Central Committee members. In response Bolsheviks had expelled PLSR(i) members from the Presidiums of the Tambov Governorate Soviet and the Tambovsky Uyezd Soviet. However the PLSR(i) members in boards and departments of the various commissariats had remained in their functions. For a long period PLSR(i) had retained railway commissar posts, these positions were lost only after intervention from the Bolshevik leadership in Moscow.
Tula Governorate	Tula governorate delegate I. Kraskov argued that the situation was still favourable for the party. He stated that before the July 6 uprising PLSR(i) some 300 members. After the July 6 uprising 8 party members were arrested but later released. In each uyezd there was an underground party organization with up to 40 members each.
Tver Governorate	Tver Governorate delegate I. Klyuev stated that Left SRs suffering persecution after the July 6 uprising and that some sectors of the party had sided with the Party of Narodnik Communists. He stated that there were still Left SRs in Uyezd Soviets, but that their representatives in the Soviets were being pressured to sign denunciations of the PLSR(i) Central Committee line.
Vologda Governorate	Shipkov, a delegate from Vologda Governorate, stated that overall the party organization had collapsed after the July 6 uprising, but that normal party activity continued in some locations.
Voronezh Governorate	E.F. Muravyov, a delegate from Voronezh Governorate, argued that in the governorate there had been fierce tensions between PLSR(i) and the Bolsheviks even before the July 6 uprising. Per Muravyaov, the root of the tension was the food policy of the Bolsheviks. About two weeks prior to July 6 uprising the PLSR(i) resigned from various soviets in protest against the food policy. During the July 6 uprising the situation in Voronezh was tense, but planned arrests of PLSR(i) leaders had not taken place. As of October 1918 PLSR(i) still had a formal party office in the Governorate, but the party organizations had gone underground. He claimed PLSR(i) had organizations in all uyezds.
Yaroslavl Governorate	Trofimov, a delegate from Yaroslavl Governorate, stated that arrests had occurred after the July 6 uprising and that Left Socialist-Revolutionaries had been excluded from most executive committees of soviets. In the Yaroslavl Governorate Congress of Soviets only a small faction of 15 Left Socialist-Revolutionaries remained.
Yekaterinodar	Lysenko, a delegate from Yekaterinodar, stated that prior to the July 6 uprising the PLSR(i) was somewhat weaker than the Bolsheviks in Soviet elections. The Bolsheviks had rejected proportional representation in the Soviets and offered the PLSR(i) solely two posts of commissars (including the Commissar for National Minorities Affairs, which was not highly valued by the PLSR(i)). The PLSR(i) thus refused to join the Yekaterinodar commissariats. After the July 6 uprising the PLSR(i) chairman in Armavir, the local PLSR(i) committee disbanded and its members were expelled from the Armavir Soviets. The Yekaterinodar Left Socialist-Revolutionaries (who had a 400-man combat force) pressured the Bolsheviks to release the Armavir Left Socialist-Revolutionary chairman.

== Central Committee election ==
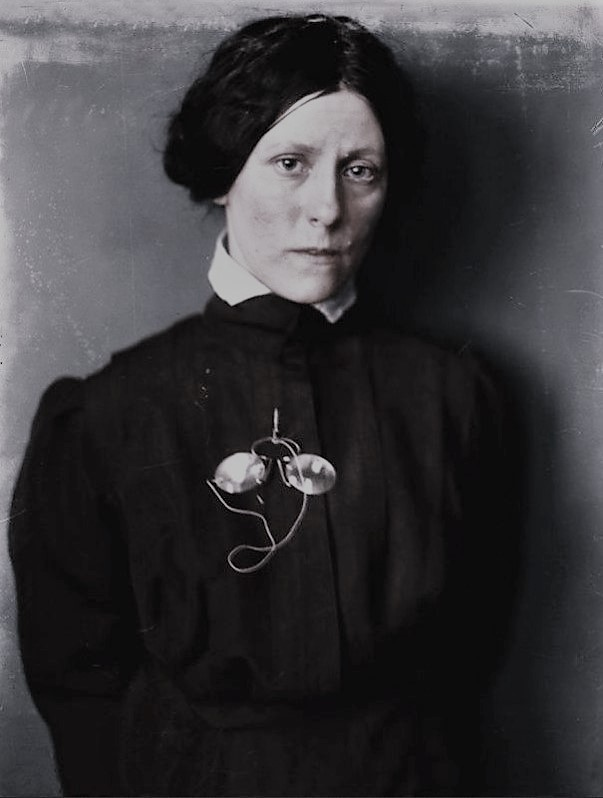
Maria Spiridonova

On October 1, 1918, on the eve before the opening of the party congress, a meeting of the PLSR(i) Central Committee and Central Bureau was held. The meeting adopted a resolution calling on the party congress to elect a Central Committee with 15 full members and 5 candidate members.

The election took place on October 3, 1918. Historians have not been able to fully reconstruct the listing of elected Central Committee members from the congress protocols. Leontiev (2007) notes a February 1921 Cheka report naming 15 members of an 'old Central Committee' of the party, consisting of Spiridonova, Vladimir Karelin, Boris Kamkov, Bakkal, Samokhvalov, Isaac Steinberg, Mayorov, Aleksandra Izmailovich, Onisim Chizhikov, Vladimir Trutovsky, Mikhail Krushinsky, Alexander Schrader, Donat Cherepanov, Rybin and Yacob Bogachev. Presumably this 'old Central Committee' would have originated at the 4th party congress but would have undergone some changes afterwards. For example Leontiev argues that probably Dmitry Magervosky and Prosh Proshian would have been elected to the Central Committee in October 1918, but notes that Magerovsky broke away and joined the Ukrainian Party of the Left Socialist-Revolutionaries (Borbists) soon after the 4th party congress whilst Proshian died before the end of 1918. Cherepanov, who is mentioned in the 1921 Cheka report as a Central Committee member, was expelled from the party in September 1919. Some of the 'old Central Committee' members mentioned in the February 1921 report might have been elected as candidate members at the 4th party congress or would have been inducted by decision of the party leadership.

Before the October 3, 1918 vote Krushinsky, Magerovsky and Cherepanov had declared that they were withdrawing from the contest, but the party congress decided to retain them on the list of candidates and elected them anyway.

== Debates and resolutions ==
With the main leader of the party Spiridonova imprisoned at the Kremlin it fell on Kamkov, Karelin and Proshian to represent the Central Committee in bearing responsibility for the July debacle at the 4th party congress. Karelin presented the Central Committee report to the party congress. Kamkov presented a report of tactics for political struggle. Proshian in a speech that the 'disruption' of the Brest-Litovsk peace treaty was a correct line of action. Spiridonova addressed the gathering through a letter which self-critically reviewed the actions of the Central Committee.

During the party congress proceedings a number of delegates, such as Cherepanov, Magerovsky, Krushinsky, Chizhikov and Grigory Lesnovsky, voiced critiques against the actions of the Central Committee. These delegates argued that the party should abandon armed struggle against the Bolsheviks and seek legalization of the party. These propositions were put forth to vote, and were rejected by the majority of party congress delegates. The party congress reaffirmed the line of armed struggle against the Bolsheviks and called for the abolition of the Council of People's Commissars and the transfer of the role of governance to the All-Russian Central Executive Committee.

The party congress strongly rejected what it described as the conciliatory approach of the Bolsheviks towards German imperialism as well as what the party congress described as the 'replacement of the dictatorship of the working people with the dictatorship of the Bolshevik party'. The party congress call for a 'return to a genuine Soviet system' of governance in Russia, calling for restoration of free elected Soviets and a decentralization of decision-making. Furthermore the party congress endorsed the uprising in Ukraine. The party congress did not deny responsibility nor condemn the killing of Count Mirbach during the July 1918 uprising.

The congress adopted a special resolution 'on the split from the party of the Bitsenko-Zaks groups' (i.e. the Party of Revolutionary Communism and the Party of Narodnik Communists respectively). This resolution appealed to all local party units to reject the splinter-groups and approved of the purging of the party ranks of 'careerist-unstable and simply dishonest people'.

== Aftermath ==
The 4th party congress failed to heal the wounds in the PLSR(i), which continued on the path to disintegration. Disagreements and tensions between party leaders continued. During the 4th party congress or in its immediate aftermath some key figures, such as Magerovsky and D.E. Sinyavsky broke with the party, and the exodus from the party would continue in the local party organizations as well.
