= Grigorii Nikolaevich Maksimov =

Russian politician (1893–?)

- Максимов Георгий Николаевич
- Born: 1893; Ufa, Russia
- Died: Unknown
- Occupation: Politician
- Political party: Party of Socialist Revolutionaries

Grigorii Nikolaevich Maksimov (Russian: Максимов Георгий Николаевич; 1893 – ?) was a Russian politician.

== Early life ==
He was born in 1893 in Ufa. Maksimov joined the Party of Socialist-Revolutionaries (PSR) in 1910. He was arrested on a number of occasions. He was intermittently in exile in Narym between 1911 and 1916. He escaped from exile, and stayed in France for a period.

== During the Russian Revolution ==
=== 1917 ===
During 1917, he was a leader of the PSR in Ufa. When the PSR split he sided with the Party of Left Socialist-Revolutionaries (internationalist), and became a member of the Ufa Governorate Committee of the PLSR(i).

=== 1918 ===
In early 1918, Maksimov went to Petrograd to attend the Third All-Russian Peasants Congress as a representative of the PLSR(i) from Ufa. He was elected as chairman of the congress and was inducted into the All-Russian Central Executive Committee. Maksimov became the vice chairman of the Moscow Regional Council of People's Commissars.

During the 6 July 1918 Left SR uprising, Maksimov was one of the members of the PLSR(i) faction at the Fifth All–Russian Congress of Soviets and was arrested at the Bolshoi Theatre during the crackdown of the revolt. Maksimov was released after a few days of detention. He left Moscow and stayed in hiding, fearing to be arrested again. Whilst underground he was informed that he had been elected in absentia to the Central Committee of the Party of Revolutionary Communism. He then returned to Moscow and would remain there for the remainder of 1918 and during 1919. He again became a member of the All-Russian Central Executive Committee.

=== 1919 ===
In 1919, Maksimov was part of the effort to unite the Party of Revolutionary Communism with other populist factions, on a platform of support of soviet power. But at the Fourth Party Congress of the Party of Revolutionary Communism held in October 1918, Maksimov and others who favoured unification with other populists were defeated by the group of Aleksei Ustinov. Subsequently the Central Committee majority decided to expel Evgenia Semenovskaya, Vladimir Zitta, Vladimir Bezel and Maksimov from the party for 'violation of party discipline' and for seeking unity with populist sectors (including groups such as the PLSR(i) or the PSR).

After being expelled from the Party of Revolutionary Communism, Maksimov's mandate in the All-Russian Central Executive Committee was declared invalid. Maksimov went underground again and moved to Ukraine. He was soon inducted into the Central Committee of the Ukrainian Party of Left-Socialist Revolutionaries (Borbists). When the Borbists merged into the Bolshevik party a few months later, Maksimov broke with the party.

== Later life ==
Maksimov returned to Moscow and enrolled in university. Maksimov became the chairman of the student section of the All-Russian Committee for Famine Relief. He was arrested along with other committee members, albeit soon released. He was arrested during other moments in the 1920s and detained for shorter periods. He graduated from Moscow State University in 1926, and he began working as an economist in different institutions. He was arrested in 1930 and spent three years at Suzdal prison. After release from Suzdal he was sent into internal exile, but he was again arrested. He was released from prison camp in 1954. He lived in Moscow again and was active as a painter. As of the late 1970s, Maksimov was a rare survivor among former participants of the 1917 revolutions in the Soviet Union. In 1980, his memoirs were published abroad.
