= Vladimir Bezel =

Russian agronomist and politician

Vladimir Yakovlevich Bezel (Russian: Безель, Владимир Яковлевич) was a Russian agronomist and politician.

== Political activity and official roles ==
=== Early career (1904 – 1917) ===
Bezel joined the Party of Socialist-Revolutionaries in 1904. He was elected to the Moscow City Duma in 1917. He sided with the Party of Left Socialist-Revolutionaries (internationalists) (PLSR(i)) in the party split.

=== 1918 ===
On 2 January 1918, Bezel was part of the nine-member delegation (nicknamed 'the nine') that travelled to Petrograd, with a mandate from the All-Russian Food Congress to negotiate food policy with the Council of People's Commissars. On 25 February 1918, Bezel was appointed to the board of the People's Commissariat for Food. He was also named Moscow Regional Deputy People's Commissar for Food.

During the Second PLSR(i) Party Congress, held 17–25 April 1918, Bezel was part of the minority faction led by Andrei Kolegayev, which opposed the departure of the PLSR(i) from the Council of People's Commissars. In parallel on 19 April 1918, the Council of People's Commissars approved a decree on the establishment of the All-Russian Evacuation Commission, with Bezel being appointed extraordinary commissioner. However at a subsequent meeting on 23 April 1918, the Council of People's Commissars voted in favour of a proposal of Vladimir Lenin to appoint Miron Vladimirov as the commissioner instead of Bezel.

On 9 May 1918, the Council of People's Commissars issued a decree titled 'On the emergency powers of the People's Commissar for Food'. In protest against this decree, Bezel resigned from his post on the People's Commissariat for Food board and his post as Moscow Regional Deputy People's Commissar for Food.

After the failed Left-Socialist Revolutionary uprising of 6–7 July 1918, Bezel was active in the dissident group led by Kolegaev. Bezel was part of the bureau to prepare the September 1918 congress which founded the Party of Revolutionary Communism as an independent party.

=== 1919 ===
In 1919, Bezel was part of the effort to unite the Party of Revolutionary Communism with other populist factions, on a platform of support to soviet power. But at the Fourth Party Congress of the Party of Revolutionary Communism held in October 1918, Bezel and others who favoured unification with other populists were defeated by the group of Aleksei Ustinov. Subsequently the Central Committee majority decided to expel Bezel, Evgenia Semenovskaya, Vladimir Zitta and Grigory Maksimov from the party for 'violation of party discipline' and for seeking unity with populist sectors (including groups such as the PLSR(i) or the PSR).
