= Party of Revolutionary Communism =

Party of Revolutionary Communism Партия революционного коммунизма
- Founded: September 25, 1918
- Dissolved: September 22, 1920
- Split from: Left Socialist-Revolutionaries
- Merged into: Russian Communist Party (Bolshevik)
- Newspaper: Volya Truda
- Membership (1918): 2,800
- Ideology: Revolutionary socialism Narodism

Party of Revolutionary Communism (in Russian: Партия революционного коммунизма) was a political party in Russia 1918–1920. It was formed by a Narodnik group which broke away from the Left Socialist-Revolutionaries after the latter's mutiny in July 1918. The party favoured co-operation with the Russian Communist Party (Bolsheviks) (RCP(B)), and pledged support for soviet power. During its two-year existence the Party of Revolutionary Communism struggled with divisions, as the party sought to assert an independent pole in the midst of war communism.

== History ==
=== Split after the 6–7 July 1918 uprising ===
Along with another Left Socialist-Revolutionary splinter-group, the Party of Narodnik Communists, the group that would form the Party of Revolutionary Communism opposed the actions and decisions taken by the Central Committee of the Party of Left Socialist-Revolutionaries (internationalists) in carrying out the failed 6–7 July uprising. The split originated with the decision of the Saratov Party Organization of PLSR(i) on 9 July 1918, to denounce the 6–7 July uprising and called for convening of an All-Russia Conference of Left Socialist-Revolutionaries to held in Saratov on 20 July 1918. The Saratov Party Organization of PLSR(i) supported united front with the Bolsheviks. In its call for an All-Russian Congress of Party Organization Representatives, the Saratov group listed three caveats that participants would have to agree upon – the rejection of disruption of the Brest-Litovsk peace, the rejection of terrorism and the rejection of trying to seize power from the Bolsheviks through violence. The dissidence in Saratov had an echo among some leading figures in the party such as Andrei Kolegayev, Mark Natanson and Novitsky. On 14 September 1918, a publication named Volya Truda began publishing as a joint organ of the Saratov-based group and the group around Kolegaev, Natanson and Novitsky. Volya Truda denounced the attempt of the PLSR(i) Central Committee to try to seize power and disrupt the Treaty of Brest-Litovsk through the murder of Count Wilhelm von Mirbach on 6 July 1918. The first issue of Volya Truda called for the holding of congress of Left Socialist-Revolutionaries.

=== First Party Congress ===
The Volya Truda tendency organized a party congress in Moscow 25–30 September 1918. The preparatory bureau for the congress had consisted of Kolegaev, Aleksei Ustinov (leader of the Saratov group), Anastasia Bitsenko, M. N. Dobrokhotov, Vladimir Bezel and A. N. Alexandrov. The congress was held at the premises of the former Moscow Theological Seminary.

Kolegaev, Ustinov, Bitsenko and Evgenia Semenovskaya formed the party congress presidium. Yegoshin, Lukov and Korev formed the Credentials Commission. Sixty delegates with a decisive votes, from 15 governorates participated in this congress. Out of these sixty voting delegates there were 15 erstwhile members of the PLSR(i) faction in the All-Russian Central Executive Committee, 5 representatives of governorate-level PLSR(i) party organizations and 40 representatives from uyezd-level PLSR(i) party organizations. In addition to the delegates with decisive votes there were also 29 delegates with consultative votes present, including 8 members of the Party of Narodnik Communists and 3 members of the Union of Socialists-Revolutionaries-Maximalists.

At the congress there was a proposal to participate in the upcoming Fourth All-Russian Congress of the Party of Left Socialist-Revolutionaries (internationalists). The proposal was voted down, and 15 people (out of whom 8 were delegates with decisive votes) left the venue in protest.

Instead, the congress majority voted to declare their separation from the PLSR(i) and the formation of the Party of Revolutionary Communism as an independent party. The congress affirmed that whilst they were breaking organizationally with the PLSR(i) over tactics, they remained committed to the Left Socialist-Revolutionary programme. The party congress listened to reports from the different governorate-level and uyezd-level party organizations present. Political, social and economic issues were debated. The congress adopted the slogan 'All to the Soviets and through the Soviets' (Все в Советах и Советы). Dobrokhotov presented the economic programme of the party, which included calls for abolishing of money relations, nationalization of trade, naturalization of wages and universal labour conscription.

The congress declared the Party of Revolutionary Communism as the party for the 'broad revolutionary masses of town and country'. The congress voted to give significant autonomy for local party organizations, but with party congress decisions being binding for all party organizations. The congress instructed party organizations to form factions in soviets.

The Central Committee of the Party of Revolutionary Communism consisted of Kolegaev, Bitsenko, Ustinov, A. N. Alexandrov, M. A. Dobrokhotov, G. N. Maksimov and V. N. Cherny as members and Evgenia Semenovskaya as candidate member.

=== Between the First and Second Party Congresses ===
By mid-November 1918 the first split in the new party had occurred as Central Committee members Kolegayev, Bitsenko, Alexandrov, Dobrokhotov and Cherny joined the RCP(B). They argued that the RCP(B) and the Party of Revolutionary Communism shared common goals and that thus the existence of two separate parties was not justified.

In the wake of the split the Volga-Urals Conference of Revolutionary Communists was held on 15 November 1918, was held in Saratov. The conference announced support for the socialization of land. It reaffirmed the opposition to Bolshevik food policy and the Committees of Poor Peasants. As of December 1918 the party committees in Volga-Urals were located in Saratov, Simbirsk, Samara, Kazan, Penza, Kerensk and Pugachyov.

=== Second Party Congress ===
The party held a Second Party Congress, beginning on 2 December 1918. At the party congress there were 28 delegates with decisive votes and 3 delegates with consultative votes representing some 2,800 party members and 1,500 sympathizers. The delegates represented 15 governorate-level and 50 uyezd-level party organizations. The congress discussed economic issues and the relationship with the Bolsheviks. At the Second Party Congress Semenovskaya, as the main theoretician of the party, presented the political line of the party – calling for rapprochement with the Bolsheviks not on an Orthodox Marxist platform but based on 'integral socialism'. Arguing for 'integral socialism' Semenovskaya denounced the 'one-sided dictatorship of the proletariat' and called instead for the 'dictatorship of the entire toiling class' (диктатурой всего класса трудящихся).

Vladimir Zitta was elected to the Central Committee at the party congress, and was made the Secretary of the Central Committee.

=== Third Party Congress ===
A Third Party Congress was held in April 1919. At the time the party was estimated to have some 3,300 members and sympathizers. There were 30 delegates with decisive votes and 7 delegates with consultative votes, representing six governorates and ten uyezds. But there were clear discrepancies in the size of the party organizations represented; the Petrograd delegate at the party congress represented only five party members whilst the Moscow delegate represented a hundred party members. The Third Party Congress called for support to soviet power and the Red Army.

Key leaders of the party at this point included Ustinov and Pavel Sapozhnikov.

On 26 April 1919, the Saratov Governorate Committee of the RCP(B) decided to include members of the Party of Revolutionary Communism in the Executive Committees of the governorate and city soviets.

=== Fourth Party Congress ===
A group within the party leadership sought unity with other populist sectors. In August 1919 a conference took place in Moscow with the participation of the Party of Revolutionary Communism, the Borbists and the Maximalists. This conference adopted a resolution calling for unity of socialist-revolutionary forces and formed a Unification Organizing Committee with Zitta and Semenovskayas as its members. On 8 September 1918, Zitta and Semenovskaya signed the joint declaration 'To all revolutionary populists'. But these moves towards unity with other populist sectors were opposed within the party by Ustinov, Andreev, Shnurovsky and others.

The Fourth Party Congress, meeting in October 1919, recognized that the party had 'difficulties in working with the masses', gaps in communication between the Central Committee and Party Organizations and a decline in party membership. By October 1919 the party had 2,297 members and sympathizers. In the debates at the congress the opponents to unification with other populists (led by Ustinov) prevailed. Subsequently the Central Committee majority decided to expel Zitta, Maksimov, Semenovskaya and Bezel from the party for 'violation of party discipline' and for seeking unity with populist sectors (including groups such as the PLSR(i) or the Party of Socialist-Revolutionaries).

As the political situation became increasingly harsh in the midst of the Russian Civil War, the Party of Revolutionary Communism moved increasingly closer to the RCP(B). After the Fourth Party Congress the party moved closer to Bolshevism. In January 1920 the Central Committee issued a directive to party members to join the war at the Western Front, that 5% of party funds would be assigned to the Red Army and that party organizations cooperate with RCP(B) locally for building agricultural cooperatives.

=== Fifth Party Congress ===
A Fifth Party Congress was held in from 28 April to 2 May 1920. Around this time the party had organizations in 16 governorates, with 126 party cells and 1,151 members. The Fifth Party Congress abandoned the categorical rejection of the dictatorship of the proletariat, thus removing the major barrier for unity with the Bolsheviks. The Fifth Party Congress affirmed support for economic measures of soviet power, such as the militarization of labour and the formation of labour armies, as necessary to deal with the current extraordinary conditions. The Fifth Party Congress declared that it was an obligation of all party members to support soviet power.

=== Disintegration ===
Two representatives of the Party of Revolutionary Communism (Ustinov and Sapozhnikov) were allowed to attend the July 1920 Second Congress of the Comintern in a deliberative capacity, with consultative votes. Ustinov and Sapozhnikov handed over a declaration from the Central Committee of the Party of Revolutionary Communism to the Congress Presidium, which expressed that the party was ready to adhere to the decisions of the Comintern Congress and raised the question of joining the RCP(B). Local party organizations did not oppose this move by the Central Committee.

The Sixth Party Congress of the Party of Revolutionary Communism held in Moscow on 21–22 September 1920 decided, in line with the 2nd Comintern Congress decision that there must only exist one single Communist Party in each country, to self-dissolve and appealed to its followers to join the RCP(B). Only one resolution was adopted by the Sixth Party Congress, titled 'On the Unified Communist Party'. There were 39 delegates with decisive votes and 12 delegates with consultative votes taking part in the congress. At the time of its dissolution the party had 1,625 members and sympathizers. There were negotiations between the erstwhile leadership of the Party of Revolutionary Communism and the RCP(B) Central Committee. In October 1918, the RCP(B) Central Committee permitted Party organizations to enroll members of the former Party of Revolutionary Communism into the RCP(B), and issued a circular instructing the party organizations not to discriminate against former members of the Party of Revolutionary Communism when appointing cadres for roles in the party or soviets.

== Ideological line and political positions ==
The Party of Revolutionary Communism retained the Left Socialist-Revolutionary programme, but differed with the PLSR(i) on tactics. It upheld the theoretical legacy of Nikolay Mikhaylovsky and Pyotr Lavrov. Vladimir Lenin perceived the programme of the Party of Revolutionary Communism as "remaining on the platform of Narodnik utopianism" and "muddled and eclectic". Per Lenin, "[w]hile recognising that Soviet rule created preconditions for the establishment of a socialist system, the party denied the necessity of the proletarian dictatorship during the transitional period from capitalism to socialism". The party spoke of a single class of 'toiling people' (трудящихся) that would encompass both urban industrial and rural agricultural workers.

The Party of Revolutionary Communism aligned with the Bolsheviks calling for the victory of world revolution and supported universal labour conscription, red terror and abolishing of commodity-money relations. But they differed with the Bolsheviks on agrarian issues, and opposed the Committees of Poor Peasants. Whilst the party supported the campaign against kulaks, it opposed perceived excesses committed in the name of fighting kulaks. The party called for socialization of land, as a voluntary and gradual process.

== Social base ==
Whilst the Party of Revolutionary Communism defined itself as a party for toiling masses the party membership became largely limited to intellectuals, sectors that retained ambitions for a 'third way'. For example, the delegate from Kazan at the Third Party Congress stated that among 40 members there were 36 intellectuals, 3 workers and a single peasant.

Those that remained in the Party of Revolutionary Communism after the different splits often suffered repression linked to their opposition towards the Bolshevik food policy.

== Party organ ==
The central party organ was Volya Truda (Воля Труда, 'Will of Labour'), which was published as a daily newspaper from 14 September to 4 December 1918. From 29 December 1918, the daily newspaper was replaced by a periodical with the same title. Per Fleishman (1990) Volya Truda had an mediocre editorial team at its onset, but that on the eve of the First Party Congress the editorial board began publishing a cultural and literary section which would include texts from writers like Sergei Yesenin, Andrei Bely, Velimir Khlebnikov, Osip Mandelstam, Vadim Shershenevich and Boris Pasternak.
