= Evgenia Semenovskaya =

Russian revolutionary and ophthalmologist

Evgenia Semenovskaya

Evgenia Nikolaevna Semenovskaya (Simonovskaya) (Russian: Семеновская (Симоновская) Евгения Николаевна, 1895–1976) was a Russian ophthalmologist and revolutionary politician. At a young age she was a Socialist-Revolutionary (later Left Socialist-Revolutionary) leader in Ufa during 1917–1918, and would then be one of the main leaders of the short-lived Party of Revolutionary Communism. She left politics in 1920 and would pursue a long research career in ophthalmology.

== Revolution in Ufa ==
Semenovskaya was born in 1895. During her youth she was active in the Party of Socialist-Revolutionaries. In 1917 she sided with the Party of Left Socialist-Revolutionaries (internationalists). By late 1917 she was a member of the Ufa Revolutionary Committee and the Ufa Governorate Committee of the PLSR(i). With the establishment of soviet power in the area, she was placed in charge of the Commissariat for Popular Education in Ufa. She was the editor of Zemlya i volya ('Land and Will'), the organ of PLSR(i) in Ufa. In May 1918, in protest against the PLSR(i) Central Committee line on the Treaty of Brest-Litovsk, she resigned from the PLSR(i) Governorate Committee. In the aftermath of the failed 6–7 July 1918 uprising of the PLSR(i) Semenovskaya was elected president of the PLSR(i) Ufa Governorate Committee. She stayed in this role for two months, before joining the dissident Party of Revolutionary Communism.

== Party of Revolutionary Communism ==
At the founding congress of the Party of Revolutionary Communism held in September 1918, Semenovskaya was elected as a candidate member of the party Central Committee. A few months later, at the Second Congress of the Party of Revolutionary Communism held in December 1918 Semenovskaya had emerged as the main theoretician of the party and presented the political line of the party – calling for rapprochement with the Bolsheviks not on an Orthodox Marxist platform but based on 'integral socialism'. Arguing for 'integral socialism' Semenovskaya denounced the 'one-sided dictatorship of the proletariat' and called instead for the 'dictatorship of the entire toiling class' (диктатурой всего класса трудящихся).

Semenovskaya supported unity with other elements from the Socialist-Revolutionary movement. In June 1919 she traveled to Kyiv along with G. N. Maksimov, to meet with the leadership of the Ukrainian Party of Left Socialist-Revolutionaries (Borbysts). On 8 September 1919 she signed the declaration to 'To all revolutionary populists' together with Zitta on behalf of the Party of Revolutionary Communism. She delivered the report of the Unification Organizational Bureau at the 6th All-Russian Conference of the Union of Socialists-Revolutionaries-Maximalists. But at the Fourth Party Congress of the Party of Revolutionary Communism held in October 1918, Semenovkaya and others who favoured unification with other populists were defeated Aleksei Ustinov's group. Subsequently the Central Committee majority decided to expel Semenovskaya, Zitta, Maksimov and V. Bezel from the party for 'violation of party discipline' and for seeking unity with populist sectors (including groups such as the PLSR(i) or the Party of Socialist-Revolutionaries). After their expulsion from the Party of Revolutionary Communism, Zitta and Semenovskaya tried to conduct some independent political activities (mainly in Ukraine).

== Scientific career ==
After 1920 Semenovskaya withdrew from political activities. At the time she lived in Ukraine. She moved to Moscow, where she worked as the secretary at the representative office of the All-Ukrainian State Joint Stock Trade Company (BAKOT) and other cooperative organizations, whilst pursuing university studies. She graduated from medical school in 1927. As a scientist she would author more than 40 works on the psychophysiology of vision. From the 1930s to the 1950s she worked as a senior researcher at the Helmholtz Moscow Research Institute of Eye Diseases. She studied the lability (mobility) of the cerebral cortex and retina in patients with glaucoma. She got a doctorate in biological sciences in 1955. Semenovskaya died in 1976, at the age of 79.
