= Vladimir Zitta =

Russian politician

Vladimir Osipovich Zitta (Russian: Владимир Осипович Зитта) was a Russian politician. He was a Socialist-Revolutionary, turned Left Socialist-Revolutionary during the Russian Revolution of 1917, and he briefly served as a people's commissar in 1918. He later emerged as a leader of the Left Socialist-Revolutionary splinter-group Party of Revolutionary Communism but was expelled from that party after about one year.

== Before the revolution ==
Zitta joined the Party of Socialist-Revolutionaries in the 1910. He spent six months in jail prior to the revolutions of 1917.

== Left SR and People's Commissar ==
As of 1917 he was a member of the Executive Committee of the Moscow Soviet of Workers Deputies. As the Party of Socialist-Revolutionaries was divided, Zitta sided with the Left Socialist-Revolutionaries. In 1918, after the Left Socialist-Revolutionaries entered a coalition government with the Bolsheviks, Zitta served was named Commissar for Agriculture in the Moscow Regional Council of People's Commissars. He was a delegate to the Third All-Russian Congress of Workers, Soldiers and Peasants Deputies Soviets (January 1918).

When the Moscow Regional Council of People's Commissars was liquidated, the Central Committee of the Party of Left Socialist-Revolutionaries (internationalists) decided to send Zitta to Arkhangelsk. He was a delegate to the Third All-Russian Congress of Workers, Soldiers and Peasants Deputies Soviets (January 1918). He was also a delegate at the Fifth All–Russian Congress of Soviets (July 1918) representing the Arkhangelsk Soviet. He opted to remain in Moscow after the failed Left SR uprising.

== Party of Revolutionary Communism ==
In December 1918 he was elected to the Central Committee of the Party of Revolutionary Communism at its Second Party Congress, and he was named Secretary of the Central Committee. Within the Party of Revolutionary Communism Zitta called for unity with other Socialist-Revolutionary populist forces. After a meeting was held with the Borbists and Maximalists in Moscow in August 1919, he became a member of the Unification Organizing Bureau formed at the gathering. Subsequently Zitta was expelled from the Party of Revolutionary Communism for 'violation of party discipline'. After his expulsion from Party of Revolutionary Communism, Zitta and others expelled from the party (Bezel, Maksimov, Semenovskaya) continued political activities. To some extent their grouping had coordination with the Borbists.
