= Fort Ino =

Coordinates: 60°09′40″N 29°24′30″E

Fort Ino or Fort Nikolaevsky (Russian: форт «Ино» or форт Николаевский) is an abandoned early 20th-century Russian coastal fortification situated on the northern shore of Neva Bay in the Gulf of Finland. The fort is close to the present-day settlement Privetninskoye (former name was Ino before 1946) of Vyborgsky District of Leningrad Oblast, opposite the Krasnaya Gorka fort on the southern shore. Fort Ino is still under Russian control. The ruins of the fortress, with an extensive system of tunnels, are now abandoned and are partially accessible to the public.

== Early history ==
Fort Ino was constructed in 1909-1916 on Cape Inoniemi on the Karelian Isthmus, within the borders of Viipuri Province of the autonomous Grand Duchy of Finland. It was intended to protect the capital city of Petrograd (Saint Petersburg) and the naval base at Kronstadt, and was served by a railroad and a harbor. As Finland had become independent, on March 1, 1918, during the Finnish Civil War, in a friendship treaty the Finnish Red Guards' Edvard Gylling and Oskari Tokoi in the name of the Finnish Socialist Workers' Republic ceded the fortress to Soviet Russia in exchange for the city of Petsamo. However, the Finnish White Guards, who ultimately came out victorious in the civil war, demanded the fortress back, without offering a similar return of Petsamo, and on April 24 the 5th Jaeger Regiment under Major Hugo Viktor Österman laid siege to it. On May 8 Germany demanded Soviet Russia return the fort to Finland, and the Soviet government for fear of violating the Treaty of Brest-Litovsk withdrew its support to the crew. On May 14, 1918, the Soviet crew destroyed the batteries and evacuated to Kronstadt aboard the battleship Respublika. With the Treaty of Tartu in 1920, Finland undertook to disarm it completely within a year.

== Commissars ==
- 1917–1918 Boris Donskoy
- 1918 K.Artamonov
