= Fifth All–Russian Congress of Soviets =

←	Fourth	Sixth	→
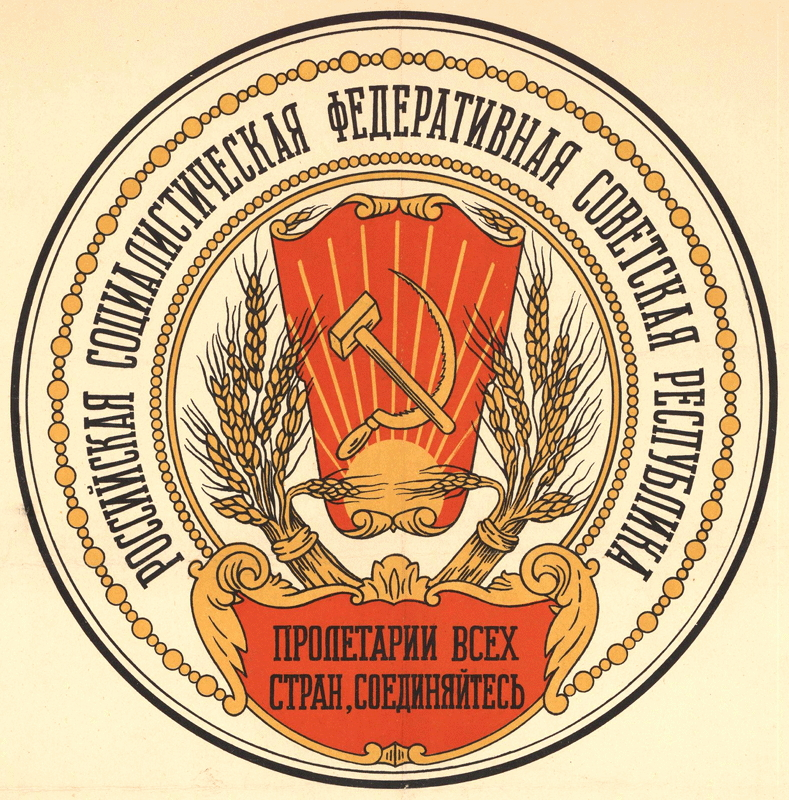
- Coat of Arms of the Russian Socialist Federative Soviet Republic

Overview
- Legislative body: All–Russian Congress of Soviets
- Jurisdiction: Russian Socialist Federative Soviet Republic
- Meeting place: Bolshoi Theater, Moscow
- Term: July 4 – July 10, 1918
- Party control: Russian Communist Party (Bolsheviks)

The Fifth All–Russian Congress of Soviets (the Fifth All–Russian Congress of Soviets of Worker's, Soldier's, Peasant's and Cossack's Deputies) was held on July 4–10, 1918, in Moscow.

== Composition of the Congress ==
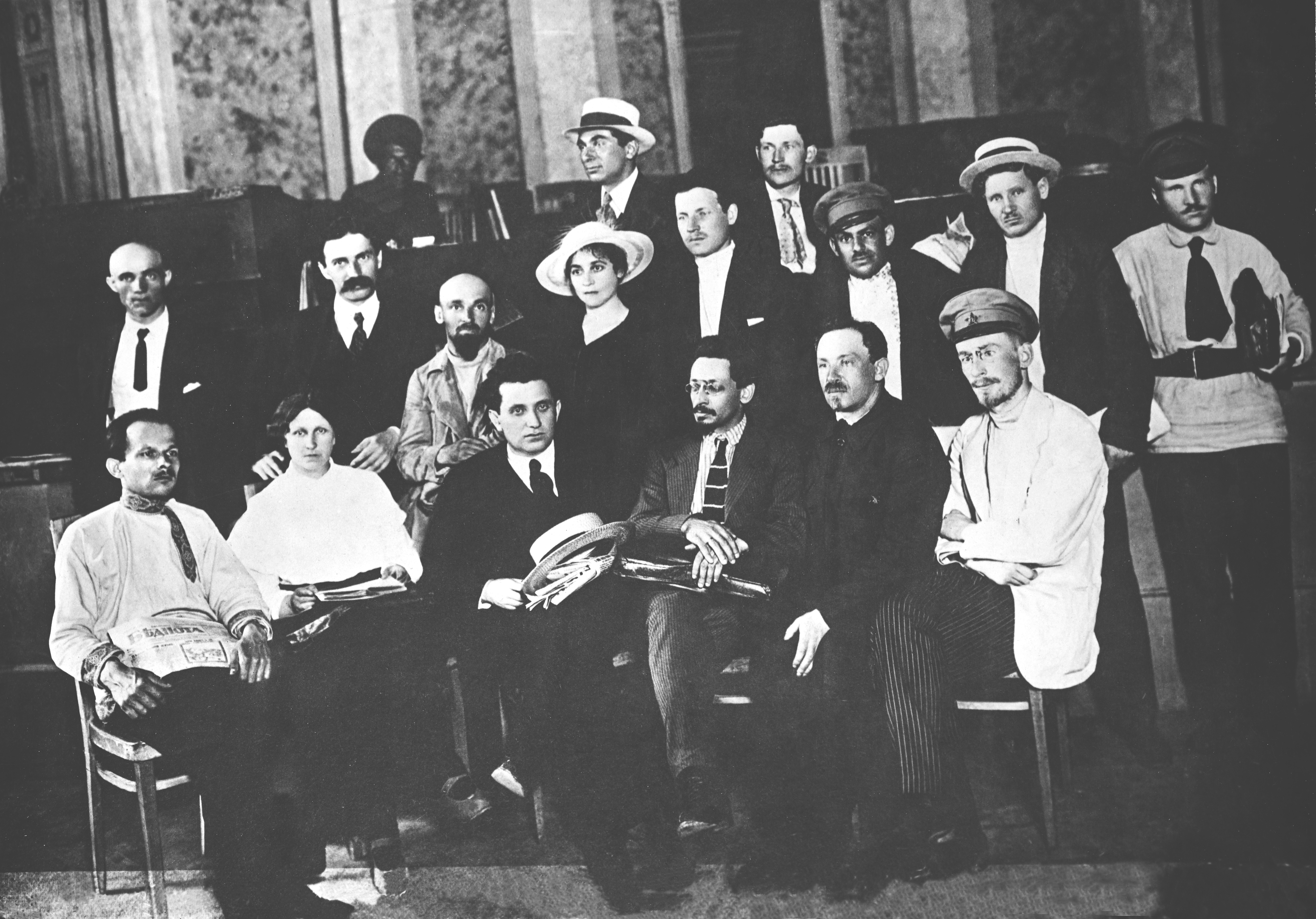
Delegates from the Bolshevik faction

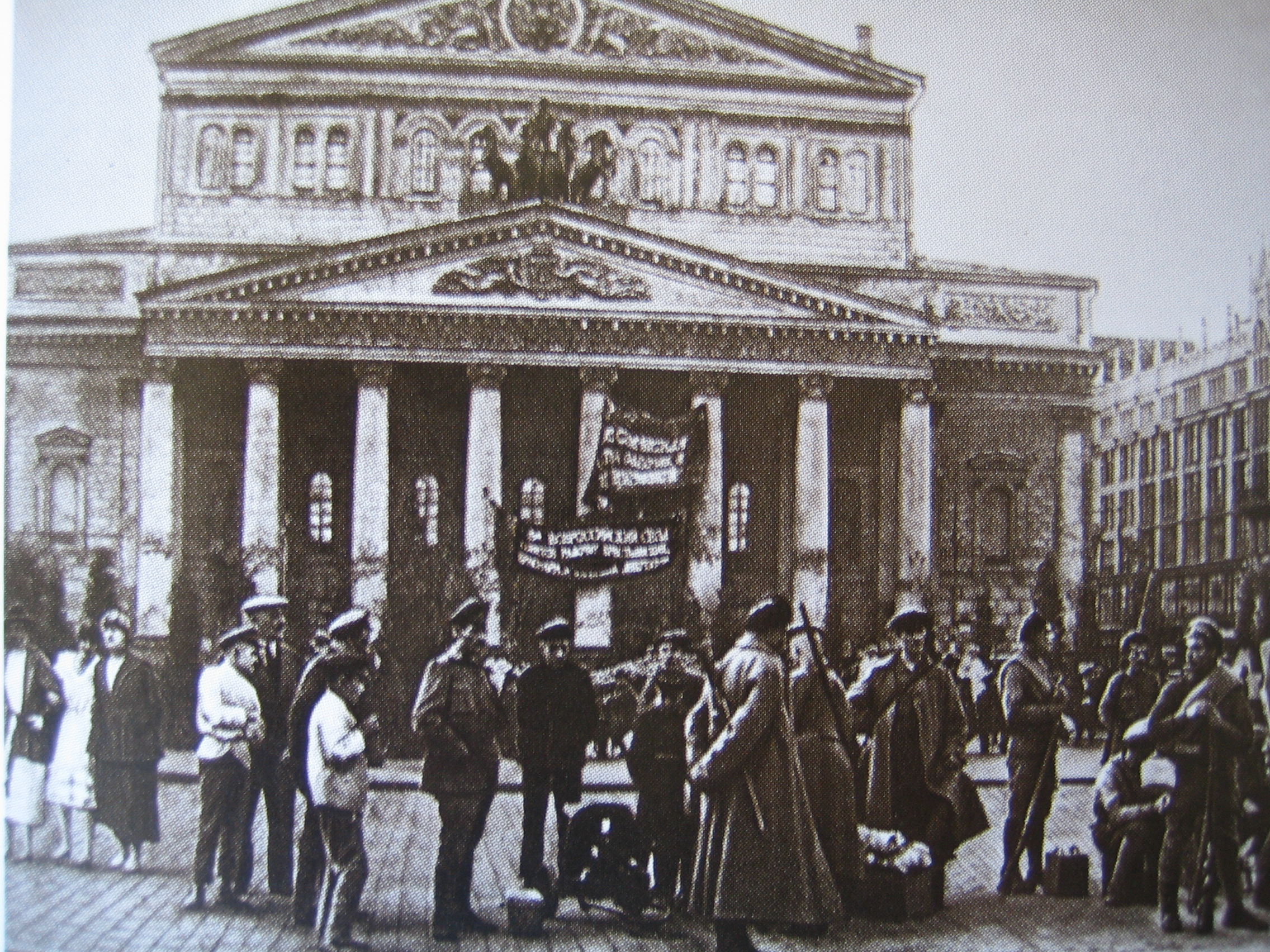
Congress delegates in front of the Bolshoi Theater

The congress was attended by 1164 delegates with a casting vote:

- 773 Bolsheviks;
- 353 Left Socialist Revolutionaries;
- 17 Maximalists;
- 4 Anarchists;
- 4 Menshevik Internationalists;
- 2 Representatives of National Groups (Dashnaktsutyun, Poalei Tzion);
- 1 Right Socialist Revolutionary;
- 10 non–partisan.

At about 18:00 on July 6, 1918, the Left Socialist Revolutionary faction was arrested in connection with the events known as the Uprising of the Left Socialist Revolutionaries. Together with the Socialist Revolutionaries, representatives of parties other than the Bolsheviks were also arrested. The third and fourth sessions of the Congress were already held under the absolute domination of the Bolsheviks.

== History ==
=== July 4–5 ===
The first meeting began on July 4 at 16:00, the Congress was opened by the chairman Yakov Sverdlov. After discussion, the order of the day proposed by the Central Executive Committee was adopted:
1. Reports of the Central Executive Committee and the Council of People's Commissars (speakers Vladimir Lenin and Yakov Sverdlov);
2. The Food Issue (Alexander Tsyurupa);
3. Organization of the Socialist Red Army (Leon Trotsky);
4. Constitution of the Russian Republic (Yuri Steklov);
5. Election of the All–Russian Central Executive Committee.

The resolution adopted at the end of the first meeting (drawn up in advance, even before the start of the Congress) read: the exclusive right to decide all issues related to war and peace belongs to the All–Russian Congress of Soviets and the authorized bodies of the Central Executive Committee and the Council of People's Commissars; the People's Commissar for Military Affairs Lev Trotsky to instruct to clear the Red Army units of provocateurs and "mercenaries of imperialism"; to send an extraordinary commission to Kursk – Lgov to suppress provocations and establish order.

The second meeting was opened under the chairmanship of Mikhail Lashevich on July 5, 1918. The problems of Ukraine (partially occupied by German troops) were discussed; constitution; the death penalty (repeated mentions of this issue were greeted with exclamations from the audience "Down with the death penalty!"; Sverdlov made a speech about the need for this measure, Maria Spiridonova objected on behalf of the Left Socialist Revolutionaries, speaking in favor of revolutionary terror, but against the death penalty); questions of the peasantry (Spiridonova criticized the Bolshevik policy in the countryside); then Lenin's detailed speech, touching upon many questions and greeted with thunderous applause; then the speech of the Left Socialist Revolutionary Kamkov and the lengthy debate on the issue of the Brest–Litovsk Peace and the calls of the Left Socialist Revolutionaries to break it.

=== July 6–8. Break in the work of the Congress ===
On July 6, 1918, at about 15:00, Left Socialist Revolutionaries Yakov Blumkin and Nikolai Andreev carried out the murder of the German ambassador, Count Mirbach, entering the embassy mansion with forged documents and hiding from the scene of the crime. Thus, with the help of a terrorist act against "agents of imperialism", the Central Committee of the Left Socialist Revolutionaries hoped to influence the policy of the Soviet government, which could not be changed in a legitimate way – to provoke Germany to break the Brest–Litovsk Peace and force the Bolsheviks to abandon the "shameful policy of compromise". The Chairman of the All–Russian Extraordinary Commission, Felix Dzerzhinsky, who arrived at the headquarters of the Left Socialist Revolutionaries to arrest the terrorists, was himself arrested. In connection with these events, at about 18:00 on July 6, the entire faction of the Left Socialist Revolutionaries was arrested at the Bolshoi Theater, as well as representatives of other parties, except for the Bolsheviks (450 people in total).

From the memoirs of Jacob Peters:

Just then Trotsky or Vladimir Ilyich phoned – I don't remember – and said that Latsis should remain in the All–Russian Extraordinary Commission, while I, along with others, should went to the Bolshoi Theater and arrested a faction of Left Socialist Revolutionaries. We went to the theater... Some of us went on stage, announced that the Bolshevik faction was going to gather, and that all the Bolsheviks should leave the theater. At the exits, we set up a document check and at first released only communists. But, of course, very soon this cunning was discovered by the Socialist Revolutionaries and others, but they did not react to it... Then we began to start up according to recommendations, according to documents. In the end, Left Socialist Revolutionaries, Internationalists and non–partisans remained in the theater. I remember that some of them were worried, asked what this meant, since they did not know the situation.

Until late in the evening, isolated Left Socialist Revolutionaries held conferences, decided organizational issues, re–elected the faction's bureau and adopted a declaration on the assassination of Mirbach, which they intended to read after the Congress resumed, then they sang revolutionary songs and finally settled down to sleep. At this time, an armed confrontation was unfolding in Moscow. By dawn on July 7, the uprising of the Left Socialist Revolutionaries had been suppressed. On the night of July 8, the arrested Left Socialist Revolutionaries were disarmed and moved to the Maly Theater, since the work of the Congress was to resume at the Bolshoi Theater on July 9.

=== July 9–10 ===
The third meeting began on July 9 at 14:30 under the chairmanship of Sverdlov. The first to speak was Trotsky with a report on the events that had just happened in Moscow, sharply condemning the actions of the Left Socialist Revolutionaries and declaring: "This party killed itself on the days of July 6 and 7 forever". The party of the Left Socialist Revolutionaries, its fate and the attitude of the Bolsheviks towards the Left Socialist Revolutionaries were one of the main subjects of discussion, sharply negative assessments were expressed. The congress decided to exclude from the Soviets the Left Socialist Revolutionaries who supported the political line of the Central Committee of their party, and leave opportunities for cooperation for those organizations of the Left Socialist Revolutionaries that would "disown" their Central Committee. In addition to this issue, the food issue was again raised at the third session. At the end of the day, Ivan Teodorovich read out a resolution from the Bolsheviks on the fight against hunger, which was adopted.

The fourth meeting began at 15:15 on July 10 under the chairmanship of Varlaam Avanesov. The following were heard:
1. Report of the Credentials Committee (speaker Vladimir Maksimovsky);
2. Avanesov's proposal to annul the resolution on roll–call voting;
3. Trotsky's report on the organization of the Red Army.

The Congress adopted the Constitution of the Russian Soviet Federative Socialist Republic of 1918. The Congress officially approved the idea of using "mass terror" against the opponents of Soviet power.
