= Znamya Trudovoi Kommuny =

Short lived Russian newspaper

Znamya Trudovoi Kommuny (Banner of the Labour Commune) was a Russian newspaper, published originally, from July 26 to August 18, 1918, under the title «Знамя борьбы» (Znamya Borby, Banner of Struggle) as the organ of a group of Left Socialist-Revolutionaries. Later, from August 21, it was the organ of the Party of Narodnik Communists, a break-away from the Left Socialist-Revolutionary Party. The newspaper ceased publication in November 1918, when an extraordinary congress of the Party of Narodnik Communists passed a resolution dissolving the party and merging it with the Russian Communist Party (bolsheviks).
