= All-Russian Congress of Soviets =

Supreme governing body of the RSFSR (1918–1937)

All-Russian Congress of Soviets Всероссийский Съезд Советов

Type
- Type: Unicameral

History
- Established: 1917
- Disbanded: 1937
- Preceded by: Russian Provisional Government; Russian Constituent Assembly; Governing Senate
- Succeeded by: Supreme Soviet of Russia

Elections
- Voting system: Indirect election

Meeting place
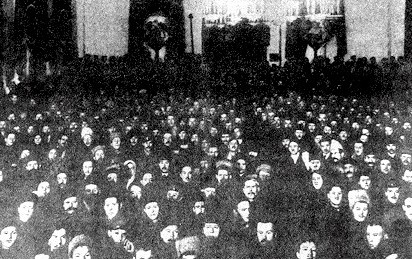
- Second All-Russian Congress of Soviets (November 7–9) in Petrograd, Smolny; The Congress had no permanent location.

The All-Russian Congress of Soviets evolved from 1917 to become the supreme governing body of the Russian Soviet Federative Socialist Republic from 1918 until 1936, effectively. The 1918 Constitution of the Russian SFSR mandated that Congress shall convene at least twice a year, with the duties of defining (and amending) the principles of the Soviet Constitution and ratifying peace treaties. The October Revolution ousted the provisional government of 1917, making the Congress of Soviets the sole, and supreme governing body. This Congress was not the same as the Congress of Soviets of the Soviet Union which governed the whole Soviet Union after its creation in 1922.

For the earlier portion of its life, the Congress was a democratic body. Over Russia there were hundreds of soviets, democratic local governing bodies in which the surrounding population could participate. The soviets elected the delegates to the Congress, and then in turn the Congress held the national authority, making the highest decisions. There were several political parties represented in the various sessions of the Congress, each of which fought for increasing their own influence in the soviets. However, as the Russian Civil War progressed, the soviets' authority was progressively reduced, with the rise of Stalinism effectively cementing this situation and decisively turning the Congress into a rubber stamp. The Congress was formed of representatives of city councils (1 delegate per 25,000 voters) and the congresses of the provincial (oblast) and autonomous republican councils (1 deputy for every 125,000 inhabitants).

The exclusive jurisdiction of the Congress consisted of the election of the All-Russian Central Executive Committee, adoption of the Constitution of the Russian SFSR and amendments to it, approval of amendments proposed by the Central Executive Committee, and approval of the autonomous republics' constitutions. On the other issues, the Congress and the Central Executive Committee had the same authority. The Congress ceased to exist at the end of the constitutional reform of 1936–1937, when first on the union and then at the republican levels indirect election to Soviets were replaced by direct elections at all levels with the Supreme Soviet as the highest legislative body.

== History ==
=== Origin of Soviets ===
The first soviets appeared during the 1905 Russian Revolution as councils (soviets) of workers in those cities that were captured by mass strikes (strike action). Enterprises that were participating in those strikes had delegated to those councils their delegates to coordinate joint actions. In various locations those councils carried different names such as "Soviet of workers deputies", "Delegate assembly", "Assembly of deputies", "Commission of elected", and others. By October 1905 the "Soviet of workers deputies" became more common. Following the example of Soviets of workers deputies in other locations were appearing Soviets of workers, sailors, and soldiers deputies, Soviets of workers and peasants deputies, Soviet of peasants deputies.

Originally, those soviets were mass political organizations.

For socialist parties the appearance of soviets was unexpected, yet each made an effort to delegate to them their representatives. Mensheviks and Socialist-Revolutionaries viewed the soviets as strike committees or local authorities of self-government. Bolsheviks saw them as the means to implement workers' power, and to lead the workers' dictatorship as well. In 1905 Vladimir Lenin noted that in political relations the Soviet of workers deputies should be viewed as the kernel or germ of provisional revolutionary government.

In 1917 Vladimir Lenin in his April theses came up with the famous slogan "All power to the Soviets!". Following the February Revolution, Lenin considered that in Russia dual power existed as an interweaving of bourgeoisie power (Provisional Government) and the powers of the revolutionary masses (soviets). All other Russian political parties considered soviets as temporary public organizations and dual power was not relevant for them as they were preparing for elections to the All-Russian Constituent Assembly.

The embedding of the Bolsheviks into the Soviets (Bolshevization of the Soviets) established the Communist-Soviet system of state power in the USSR which existed until the 1988 constitutional reform. It was a political regime that had combined in itself the dictatorship of the Communist Party and the power of soviets (councils) (see: Dictatorship of the Proletariat). The mechanism of such combination was theoretically designed by Vladimir Lenin and put into practice by the Bolshevik party. In the communist-soviet system of power, the dictatorship of the Bolshevik party (professional revolutionaries) was supplemented or concealed by the sovereignty of the soviets and therefore the system was called Soviet power.

=== Main meetings ===
==== Conference ====
Following the February Revolution, on 11–16 April 1917 in Petrograd the All-Russian conference of Soviets of workers and soldiers deputies was held.

At the conference, 480 delegates out of 139 Soviets, 13 military rear area garrisons, 7 of regular army, and 26 separate frontline councils attended.

On the agenda were

- attitude towards the War
- attitude towards the Russian Provisional Government
- organizational issues
- organization of revolutionary forces
- preparation to the Russian Constituent Assembly
- food issue
- land issue
- issues of peasants' life
- workers' issues
- others

Majority was composed of Mensheviks and SRs. The Bolshevik group introduced its own resolution drafts on key issues of agenda.

In its resolution on war that was rather defensive, presented by Menshevik-SR Petrograd Soviet Executive Committee, the conference approved the declaration of the Provisional Government about the war (of 28 March) as if it abandoned aggressive goals. The Bolshevik group, on behalf of which Lev Kamenev had been speaking, took "a wrong position" by taking off own resolution draft and voting for the Menshevik-SR resolution after it was added with resolutions about "control and impact" of revolutionary democracy on the Provisional Government and its local authorities. Recognizing the need for a legislative establishment of 8 hour workday, the conference did not call the workers upon its immediate establishment by revolutionary means. On peasant and land issues, the conference adopted its resolution about support in the Constituent Assembly for gratuitous alienation from all privately owned lands and transferring them to working people, but spoke against "arbitrary resolution of land issue at local level", leaving, thus, the land in hands of landowners.

On 16 April 1917 the conference elected 10 delegates from oblasts and 6 from the Army and the Navy to the Petrograd Soviet Executive Committee turning it in this way in central authority of Soviets of the whole country until the opening of First All-Russian Congress of Soviets of workers and soldiers deputies. On 17 April 1917, Vladimir Lenin made a report about war and revolution in which he outlined his April theses to that conference. The same day he repeated his report at a joint conference of Bolsheviks and Mensheviks who took part.

==== First Congress ====
Diagram of the First All-Russian Congress of Soviets (excluding those whose affiliation is unknown) Anarcho-Communist: 1 seat Bolsheviks: 105 seats Non-Factional Socialists: 73 seats Internationalists: 32 seats United Social Democrats: 10 seats General Jewish Labour Bund: 10 seats Mensheviks (and sympathizers): 256 seats Yedinstvo: 3 seats "Both SD and SR": 2 seats Socialist-Revolutionaries (and sympathizers): 305 seats Popular Socialists: 3 seats Trudoviks: 5 seats

The First All-Russian Congress of Soviets of Workers 'and Soldiers' Deputies (June 16 – July 7, 1917) was convened by the National Conference of the Soviets. It was dominated by pro-government parties (Socialist-Revolutionaries, etc.) and confirmed the supremacy of the Russian Provisional Government.

According to the Credentials Committee, there were 1090 delegates, 822 acting as voting delegates, representing 305 local soviets, 53 regional soviets, and 34 military organizations. Among the 777 who declared party affiliation, there were 285 SRs (as well as 20 sympathizers), 248 Mensheviks (as well as 8 sympathizers), 105 Bolsheviks, 73 non-factional socialists, 32 Internationalists, 10 United Social Democrats, 10 Bundists, 5 Trudoviks, 3 Popular Socialists, 3 members of Yedinstvo, 2 who identified as both SR and SD, and 1 anarcho-communist, leaving 17 voting delegates whose affiliation is unknown.

==== Second Congress ====
Diagram of the Second All-Russian Congress of Soviets (excluding those whose affiliation is unknown), as per the Credentials Committee's preliminary report Anarchists: 3 seats Bolsheviks: 300 seats General Jewish Labour Bund and Poale Zion: 10 seats Polish Socialist Party and Social Democracy of Poland and Lithuania: 10 seats Ukrainian Socialists: 7 seats Lithuanian Socialist People's Party: 4 seats Other national minority socialist parties: 3 seats Mensheviks: 82 seats Socialist-Revolutionaries: 193 seats Non-Partisans: 36 seats

Following the overthrow of the Provisional Government of Russia in the October Revolution, the Second All-Russian Congress of Soviets of Workers' and Soldiers' Deputies (November 7–9, 1917) ratified the revolutionary transfer of state power.

Precise numbers are difficult to determine, but a preliminary report by the Credentials Committee of the Congress reported that out of 670 delegates, there were about 300 Bolsheviks, 193 SRs (more than half of which were Left SRs), 82 Mensheviks (of which 14 were Internationalists), 36 non-partisans, 10 from the PPS and PSD, 10 from the Bund and Poale Zion, 7 Ukrainian Socialists, 4 from the Lithuanian Socialist People's Party, 3 from other national socialist parties, and 3 anarchists, leaving 22 with unknown affiliation. According to a 1928 publication of archival documents, there were 338 Bolsheviks, 190 SRs (98 Left, 40 Center, 32 Unaffiliated, 16 Right, 4 National), 69 Mensheviks (33 Internationalist, 22 Defencist, 14 Center), 16 SD Internationalists, 11 National Social Democrats, 1 Popular Socialist, and 23 non-partisans. However, this count is likely based on incomplete data and includes some double-counts and other errors. The St. Peters Encyclopedia states that at the congress' opening, it had 649 total delegates, representing 318 local soviets; 390 being Bolsheviks, 160 SRs, 78 Mensheviks (including 6 Menshevik-Internationalists), and 14 SD Internationalists. The Marxists Internet Archive Encyclopedia counts 649 total delegates, represening 318 local/provincial soviets, with there being 390 Bolsheviks, 160 SRs (of which about 100 were Left SRs), 86 Mensheviks (of which 14 were Menshevik-Internationalists), and 13 of other groups.

Summary of seat counts
Source	Bolsheviks	SD Internationalists	Mensheviks			Socialist-Revolutionaries					Non-Partisans	Others	Total
Source	Bolsheviks	SD Internationalists	Int.	Center	Def.	Left	Center	Right	National	Unaffiliated	Non-Partisans	Others	Total
Preliminary report by the Credentials Committee of the Congress	300	–	14	68		193 (Maj. Left)					36	59	670
1928 publication of archival documents	338	16	33	14	22	98	40	16	4	32	23	12	648
Saint Petersburg Encyclopedia	390	14	6	72		160					7		649
Marxists Internet Archive Encyclopedia	390	–	14	72		~100	~60				13		649

The congress questionnaire also asked delegates the positions of their local soviets on what they wanted the national government structure to be. 505 said "all power to the soviets", 86 said "all power to the democracy", 55 said a continuation of the Provisional Government's policy of a coalition containing the Kadets, and 21 said a coalition including propertied elements but specifically not the Kadets.

At the beginning of the congress, the Presidium was elected, containing 14 Bolsheviks and 7 Left SRs. 4 Mensheviks (including 1 Menshevik-Internationalist) were also elected to it, but they declined to take their seats. Following the election of the Presidium, Menshevik-Internationalist leader Julius Martov proposed a resolution to create a democratic coalition government containing all socialist parties, saying it was necessary to stop the ongoing crisis and avert a civil war. The SD Internationalists and Left SRs immediately spoke out in support of Martov's resolution, followed by Bolshevik Anatoly Lunacharsky who stated the Bolshevik fraction had "nothing against Martov's proposal". The resolution then passed unanimously. However, following the passage of the resolution, a series of speakers from the centrist and right-wing factions of the Mensheviks and SRs, angered by the ongoing attacks on the Provisional Government, rose to denounce the Bolsheviks as usurpers, the October insurrection as a criminal venture, and stated the Bolsheviks destroyed the congress' authority and was confronting it with a fait accompli. They then walked out of the congress, declaring they would support anti-Bolshevik resistance.

Martov then proposed another resolution, condemning the Bolsheviks for launching a "coup d'etat that threatens to bring about bloodshed, civil war, and the triumph of a counterrevolution" and stating negotiations should begin for the creation of a coalition government containing all socialist parties. The congress' work would be temporarily suspended until the government was created under the resolution. Trotsky then responded with a speech saying "no compromise is possible" and telling supporters of compromise to "go where you ought to go: into the dustbin of history!". Martov responded with "Then, we'll leave!"

Following the debate, the remaining delegates in the congress then overwhelmingly passed a manifesto written by Lenin, "To All Workers, Soldiers, and Peasants", supporting the insurrection, endorsing the transfer of supreme political power to soviets, the transfer without compensation of land to peasant committees, the democratization of the army, and the right of self-determination for all nationalities. The next day, Kamenev announced the Presidium had issued perfunctory decrees for the abolition of the death penalty on the front, the release of soldiers jailed for political crimes, the release of members of land and peasant committees jailed by the Provisional Government, and the arrest of Alexander Kerensky, which were approved by acclamation. The congress then unanimously adopted the Decree on Peace and overwhelmingly adopted the Decree on Land.

Lenin then proposed a resolution for the creation of the Council of People's Commissars (Sovnarkom), an all-Bolshevik governing body. Sovnarkom ostensibly was only a provisional government that would implement the program of the congress and operate until the Constituent Assembly. Objecting to the creation of an exclusively-Bolshevik government, SD Internationalist Boris Avilov instead proposed a resolution for the creation of a "Provisional Executive Committee" with representation from all parties that won seats in the Soviet Congress, including those that walked out. During the debate, a representative of the Executive Committee of the All-Russian Union of Railway Workers, Vikzhel, read a telegram stating that Vikzhel opposed the creation of a one-party government and threatening a nationwide strike if an all-socialist coalition government was not created. Despite this, Lenin's resolution easily passed while Avilov's only garnered 150 votes. Vikzhel's threats of a strike would eventually lead to the beginning of the Vikzhel negotiations on November 11, which would also fail.

Kamenev and Yan Berzin, who were designated by the Bolshevik CC to negotiate with the Left SRs, did offer the Left SRs some cabinet posts the day earlier. However, while sympathetic to the Bolsheviks, the Left SRs rejected the offer, as they were committed to a coalition government of all socialist parties.

Right before adjourning, the congress then elected a new Central Executive Committee, chaired by Kamenev, containing 62 Bolsheviks, 29 Left SRs, 6 SD Internationalists, 3 Ukrainian Socialists, and 1 SR Maximalist. It was also agreed that the CEC could be expanded to include peasant soviets, army organizations, and the parties that walked out.

==== Third Congress ====
Diagram of the Third All-Russian Congress of Soviets (excluding those whose affiliation is unknown) Anarchists (and sympathizers): 9 seats Socialist-Revolutionary Maximalists: 19 seats Left Socialist-Revolutionaries (and sympathizers): 281 seats Bolsheviks (and sympathizers): 647 seats National minority socialist parties: 5 seats United Social-Democrats Internationalists: 18 seats Mensheviks: 24 seats Socialist-Revolutionaries (and sympathizers): 41 seats Popular Socialists: 2 seats Non-Partisans: 84 seats

The Third All-Russian Congress of Soviets of Workers', Soldiers' and Peasants' Deputies (January 23–31, 1918) was attended by delegates from 317 Soviets of Workers', Soldiers' and Peasants' with a further 110 delegates from army, corps and divisional committees. According to the Congress questionnaire, there were 647 Bolsheviks (and sympathizers), 281 Left SRs (and sympathizers), 41 SRs (and sympathizers), 24 Mensheviks, 19 SR Maximalists, 18 SD Internationalists, 9 anarchists (and their sympathizers), 5 from nationalist groups (e.g. Polish Socialist Party), and 2 Popular Socialists. In addition, there were 84 non-partisans. Furthermore, about 668 did not answer the Congress questionnaire.

The Congress had a Presidium composed of ten Bolsheviks and three Left Socialist-Revolutionaries with a further delegate from each other group (Right Socialist-Revolutionaries, Mensheviks, etc.).

The Swiss, Romanian, Swedish and Norwegian Social-Democratic parties, the British Socialist Party and the Socialist Party of America sent messages of solidarity.

Occurring shortly after the Constituent Assembly had been dissolved by order of the All-Russian Central Executive Committee (VTsIK), the Congress resolved to expunge any references to the forthcoming Constituent Assembly from all new editions of decrees and laws of the Soviet Government. The Congress received:

- Yakov Sverdlov's report on the activity of the All-Russian Central Executive Committee.
- Vladimir Lenin's report on the activity of the Council of People's Commissars.
- Joseph Stalin's report from the People's Commissariat of Nationalities on the principles of federation and the nationalities' policy for the emerging Soviet state. The nationalities policy was agreed.

The Mensheviks, Right Socialist-Revolutionaries and the Menshevik internationalists used the Congress to indicate their opposition to the domestic and foreign policy which the Bolsheviks passed.

The Declaration of Rights of the Working and Exploited People was passed and this went on to become the basis of the Soviet Constitution. It was also agreed to establish the Russian Soviet Federative Socialist Republic on the basis of a free union of the peoples of Russia.

The Congress also approved the Decree on Land which provided the basic provisions of the redistribution and nationalization of land.

==== Fourth Congress ====
Diagram of the Fourth All-Russian Congress of Soviets at Voting Day Anarchists: 14 seats Socialist-Revolutionary Maximalists: 23 seats Left Socialist-Revolutionaries (and sympathizers): 283 seats Bolsheviks (and sympathizers): 795 seats United Social-Democrats Internationalists: 11 seats Ukrainian Social-Democrats: 3 seats Mensheviks: 27 seats Socialist-Revolutionaries: 25 seats Non-Partisans: 17 seats

At the Fourth Extraordinary All-Russian Congress of Soviets (March 14–16, 1918), the Treaty of Brest-Litovsk was ratified. This marked a rift between the Bolsheviks and the Left Socialist Revolutionaries, who voted against the treaty and whose ministers quit the Sovnarkom in protest.

On the day of opening, there were a total of 1,084 voting delegates. Among them, there were 732 Bolsheviks, 238 Left SRs, 24 SR Maximalists, 24 Mensheviks, 18 non-partisans, 16 SD Internationalists, 15 SRs, 14 anarchists, and 3 Ukrainian Social-Democrats. By the day of the vote on the Treaty of Brest-Litovsk, there were 1,198 voting delegates, of which there were 795 Bolsheviks, 283 Left SRs, 27 Mensheviks, 25 SRs, 23 SR Maximalists, 17 non-partisans, 14 anarchists, 11 SD Internationalists, and 3 Ukrainian Social-Democrats.

==== Fifth Congress ====
The Fifth All-Russian Congress of Soviets of Workers’ Peasants’, Soldiers’ and Red Army Deputies was held July 4–10, 1918. A decree that "linked citizenship to military service and obliged all healthy men aged 18–40 years to come forward" and fight for the Red Army in the Russian Civil War was passed.

The Left Socialist-Revolutionaries had 352 delegates compared to 745 Bolsheviks out of 1132 total. The Left SRs raised disagreements on the suppression of rival parties, the death penalty, and mainly, the Treaty of Brest-Litovsk. The Left SR Uprising broke out on during this Congress. Its suppression marked the end of Left SR participation in the Congress of Soviets.

==== Sixth Congress ====
The Sixth Extraordinary All-Russian Congress of Soviets of Workers’, Peasants’, Cossacks’ and Red Army Deputies was held November 6–9, 1918.

==== Seventh Congress ====
The Seventh All-Russian Congress of Soviets of Workers’, Peasants’, Cossacks’ and Red Army Deputies was held December 5–9, 1919. That year a report on the foreign policy of Soviet Russia was submitted to the Congress and Leon Trotsky read a report on Soviet military construction and fronts in the Russian Civil War.

==== Eighth Congress ====
Officially called the Eighth All-Russian Congress of Soviets of Workers’, Peasants’, Red Army and Cossack Deputies was held in Moscow on December 22–29, 1920. It was at this Congress that Gleb Krzhizhanovsky presented his report on the GOELRO plan. This was the first economic plan which focused on significant electrification of Russian industry. Lenin criticised Trotsky's pamphlet, The Role and Tasks of the Trade Unions at the subsequent preliminary joint meeting of Bolshevik delegates. The Congress also established the Sowing Committee (posevkomy).

==== Ninth Congress ====
The Ninth All-Russian Congress of Soviets was held in Moscow from December 23–28, 1921. It was attended by 1,991 delegates, of whom 1,630 held voting status.

==== Tenth Congress ====
The Tenth All-Russian Congress of Soviets was held in Moscow from December 23–27, 1922. It was attended by 1,727 delegates and 488 guests. At this Congress, 488 were from the Bolshevik-controlled states of Ukraine, Belorussia and Transcaucasia and Joseph Stalin announced the union of the Russian Soviet Federated Socialist Republic, Ukrainian Soviet Socialist Republic, Belorussian Soviet Socialist Republic, and the Transcaucasian Soviet Federated Socialist Republic into the Soviet Union, endorsed by the Congress. In his speech before the Congress, Stalin, as final words, said that: "Let us hope, comrades, that by forming our Union Republic we shall create a reliable bulwark against international capitalism, and that the new Union State will be another decisive step towards the union of the working people of the whole world into a World Soviet Socialist Republic."

==== Eleventh Congress ====
The Eleventh All-Russian Congress of Soviets was held in Moscow from January 19–29, 1924. It was attended by 1,637 delegates, of whom 1,143 held voting status.

==== Twelfth Congress ====
The Twelfth All-Russian Congress of Soviets was held in Moscow from May 7–16, 1925. It was attended by 1,634 delegates, of whom 1,084 held voting rights.

==== Thirteenth Congress ====
The Thirteenth All-Russian Congress of Soviets was held in Moscow from April 10–17, 1927. It was attended by 1,603 delegates, of whom 1,088 held voting rights.

== See also ==
- Congress of Soviets, general article for congresses of all soviet republics
