= Yevgeniy Terletskiy =

Yevhen Petrovych Terletskyi
- Євген Петрович Терлецький
- Born: March 1 (13), 1892; Lozoviy Yar, Piryatinsky Uyezd, Poltava Governorate
- Died: October 22, 1938; Voronezh
- Occupation: Politician

Yevhen Petrovych Terletskyi (Ukrainian: Євген Петрович Терлецький) was a Ukrainian and Soviet politician, member of the Russian Constituent Assembly, People Commissar (narkom) of Justice, diplomat.

Terletskyi was born in a village of Lozovyi Yar (near Yahotyn) into a family of priests. He graduated Poltava Theological Seminary and later studied at a recently established Petrograd Psychoneurological Institute. In 1911 Terletskyi joined the Socialist Revolutionary Party. He was an active participant of revolutionary events of 1917 as a member of the Petrograd Soviet and a chairman of the Poltava soviet as a member of Left Socialist-Revolutionaries. Terletskyi was elected to the Russian Constituent Assembly from Poltava Governorate as a member of the Ukrainian Party of Socialist Revolutionaries.

With the establishment of People's Secretariat, in December 1917 Terletskyi was appointed as a people's secretary of land cultivation.

In 1918 he was involved in negotiations of the Treaty of Brest-Litovsk and later assassination of German field marshal Hermann von Eichhorn.

Terletskyi was one of founders of the Ukrainian party of left socialist-revolutionaries Borbysts (not to be confused with Borotbists).
