= Dmitriyevsky Uyezd =

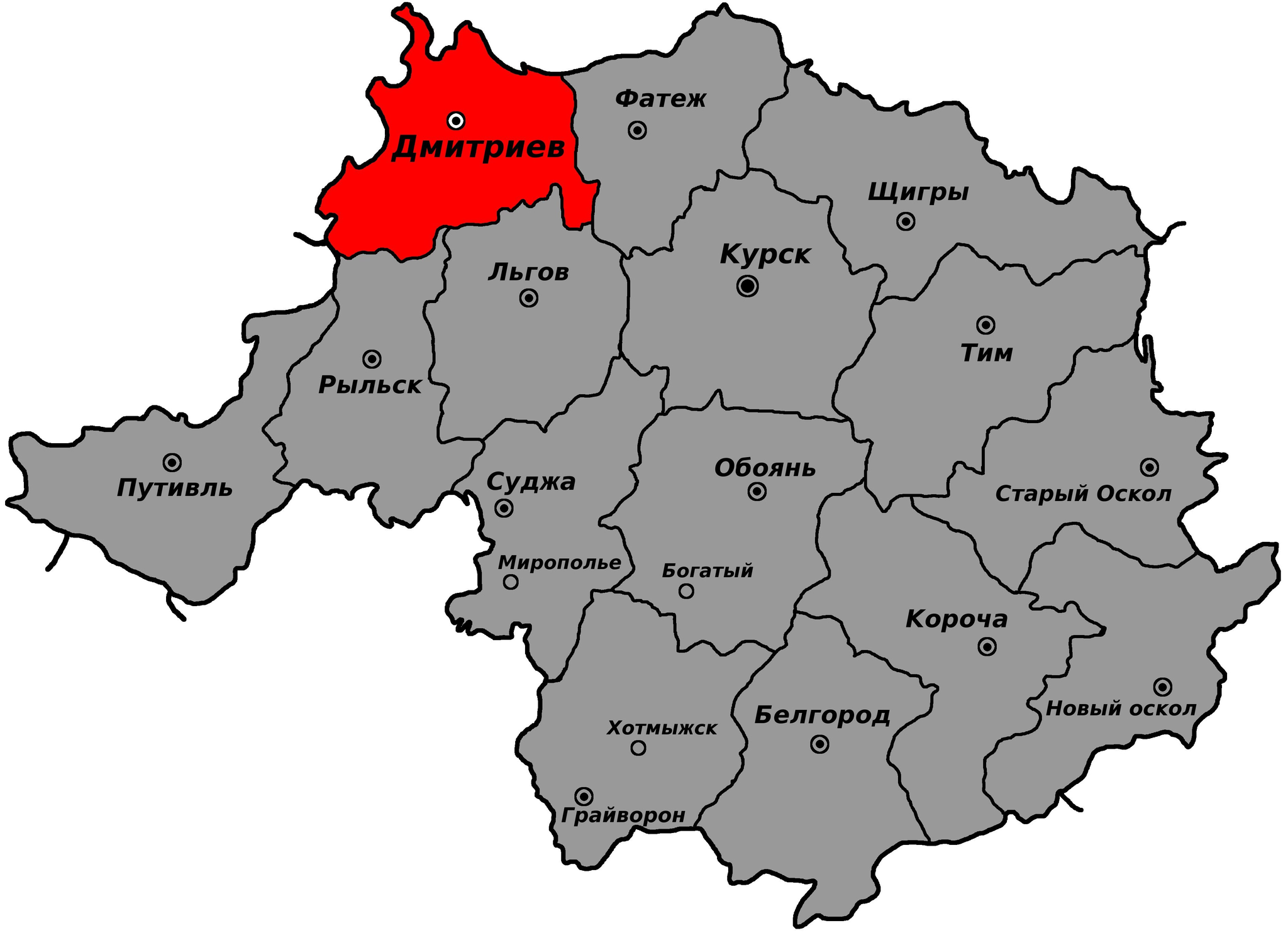
Kursk gubernia (Russian empire), Dmitrievsky_uyezd

Dmitriyevsky Uyezd (Дми́триевский уе́зд) was one of the subdivisions of the Kursk Governorate of the Russian Empire. It was situated in the northwestern part of the governorate. Its administrative centre was Dmitriyev.

== Demographics ==
At the time of the Russian Empire Census of 1897, Dmitriyevsky Uyezd had a population of 126,758. Of these, 99.2% spoke Russian, 0.5% Ukrainian, 0.2% Yiddish and 0.1% Polish as their native language.
