= Party of Narodnik Communists =

Party of Narodnik Communists Партия народников-коммунистов
- Leader: Grigory Zaks
- Founded: August 18, 1918
- Dissolved: November 12, 1918
- Split from: Left Socialist-Revolutionaries
- Merged into: Russian Communist Party (Bolshevik)
- Ideology: Narodism
- Slogan: "Through work and struggle - to communism." (Russian: Через труд и борьбу — к коммунизму)

Party of Narodnik Communists was a political party in Russia. The party was formed by a section of Left Socialist-Revolutionaries, who wished to cooperate with the Bolsheviks. Znamya Trudovoi Kommuny was the central organ of the party.

The formation of the Party of Narodnik Communists, as well as the Party of Revolutionary Communism (another Left SR dissident group), took place after the provocative assassination of the German Ambassador Mirbach by the Left Socialist-Revolutionaries and the revolt of the Left Socialist-Revolutionaries on July 6–7, 1918. The Party of Narodnik Communists condemned the anti-Soviet activities of the Left Socialist-Revolutionaries and formed a party of their own at a conference in September 1918. In November 1918 the Congress of the Party of Narodnik Communists decided to dissolve and merge with the Russian Communist Party (bolsheviks).
