= Boris Donskoy =

Russian revolutionary (1894–1918)

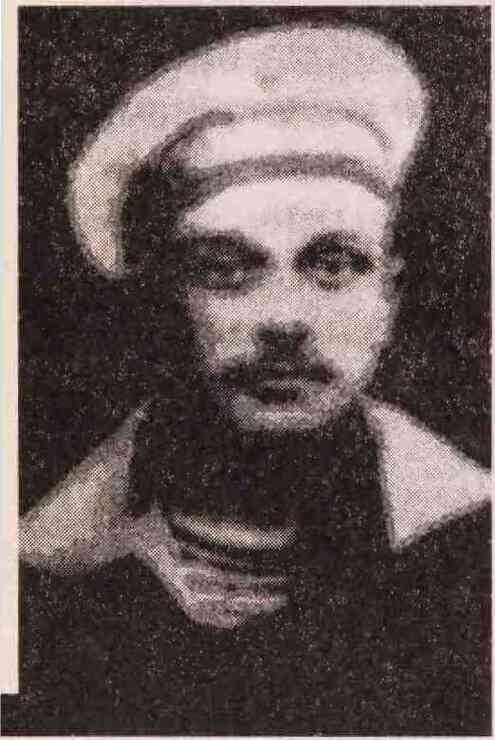
Boris Donskoy (1915)

Boris Mikhailovich Donskoy (Russian: Борис Михайлович Донской; 1894 – August 10, 1918) was a Russian revolutionary. He was a member of the Left Socialist-Revolutionary party as SR-maximalist. Donskoy became widely known for his assassination of German Field Marshal and military governor of Ukraine Hermann von Eichhorn in the summer of 1918. He was convicted of murder by a German military court and executed by hanging.

== Biography ==
=== Early life ===
Boris was born in a village of Gladkie Vyselki, Mikhailovsk uyezd (county), Ryazan Governorate in a peasant family of Russian Orthodox Old Believers. After finishing at village school Donskoy went to Saint Petersburg to seek employment at age 15. In 1915, during the First World War, he was mobilized into the Imperial Russian Army and Donskoy was placed onto a transport ship "Asia" in the Baltic Fleet.

=== Revolutionary Activities ===
In 1916 Donskoy joined the Left Socialist-Revolutionary Party and soon after that he was arrested for organizing a hunger strike and anti-government propaganda. Right after the February Revolution of 1917 Donskoy was released and elected to the executive committee of Kronshtadt.

During the July Days, Donskoy at early hours of July 17 called to the leader of the Left Socialist-Revolutionaries in the Tauride Palace to discuss the organization of the military protest and later announced it at the Kronshtadt City Council. Along with Nikolai Rivkin, Donskoy led a combined squat of Baltic sailors against the Kornilov's protest. During the October Revolution Boris Donskoy was a commissar at the Fort Ino, just outside Saint Petersburg, from where he directed military formations to the Pulkovo Heights.

In spring of 1918 along with Irina Kakhovskaya he went to Ukraine, particularly to the newly established Donetsk–Krivoy Rog Soviet Republic to prepare for fight against the Imperial German occupation. In April 1918 Donskoy joined the All-Russian Battle Organization of the Left Socialist-Revolutionaries that was sanctioned by its party to carry out an "international terror".

=== Assassination of Field Marshal Hermann von Eichhorn ===
In Kiev, together with Irina Kakhovskaya and G.Smolyansky, Donskoy prepared for an assassination attempt on the commander of the German military governor of Ukraine, Field Marshal Hermann von Eichhorn. On July 30, 1918, he threw a bomb at the Field Marshal who soon died along with his adjutant Captain Walter von Dressler. Donskoy was caught right at the crime scene and was interrogated. He stated that Eichhorn was sentenced by the Left Socialist Revolutionary Party as the commander of the German military forces who "strangled" the "revolution" in Ukraine, changed a political system, carried out a takeover as a supporter of the middle and upper class to bring to power the Hetman of Ukraine and confiscated land from peasants. Donskoy was convicted of murder by a German military court and sentenced to death by hanging. He was publicly executed on August 10, 1918.

== See also ==
- February Revolution
- Hermann von Eichhorn
- Left Socialist Revolutionaries
