= Left SR uprising =

1918 anti-Bolshevik uprising by the Left Socialist Revolutionary Party

- Part of the Russian Civil War and the left-wing uprisings against the Bolsheviks
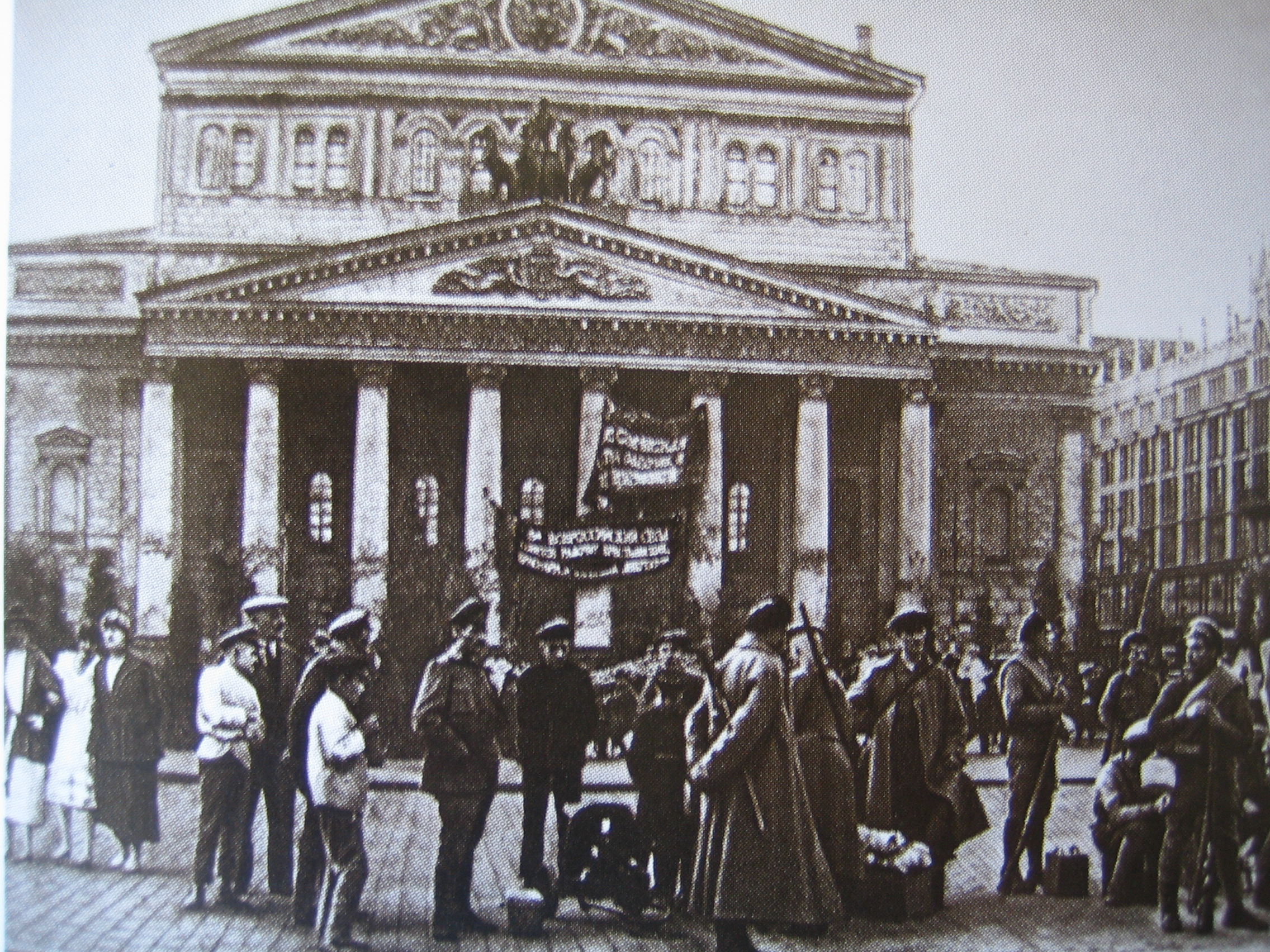
- The Latvian Riflemen guard the 5th Congress of Soviets in the Bolshoi Theatre of Moscow
Date	6–7 July 1918
Location	Moscow
Result	Bolshevik victory

Belligerents
Left SR Party	Bolsheviks

Commanders and leaders
Maria Spiridonova; Dmitry Popov; Mikhail Muravyov †; Yakov Blumkin	Vladimir Lenin; Felix Dzerzhinsky; Jukums Vācietis; Yakov Peters; Ivar Smilga

Units involved
Pro-SR Cheka faction	Latvian Riflemen; Cheka

The Left SR uprising, or Left SR revolt, was a rebellion against the Bolsheviks by the Left Socialist Revolutionary Party in Moscow, Soviet Russia, on 6–7 July 1918. It was one of a number of left-wing uprisings against the Bolsheviks that took place during the Russian Civil War.

The Left SRs had entered the Bolshevik government of Soviet Russia after the October Revolution of 1917, but resigned from the Council of People's Commissars in March 1918 in protest of the Treaty of Brest-Litovsk. Left SRs continued to work in other organizations (notably the Cheka) while denouncing the treaty and the policy of requisitioning grain from the peasants.

After winning only a minority of seats in the 5th All-Russian Congress of Soviets, on 6 July the Left SRs assassinated Wilhelm von Mirbach, the German ambassador in Moscow, in the hope of recommencing the war against "German Imperialism" and of igniting a popular uprising. The rebels occupied the Cheka headquarters and took its leader Felix Dzerzhinsky hostage, seized the telephone exchange and telegraph office, and issued manifestos. Mikhail Muravyov, a Left SR and Red Army commander in the East, seized Simbirsk.

After the uprising was suppressed with help from the Latvian Riflemen, the Bolsheviks arrested most of the party's leaders, and expelled all of its members from the soviets.

== Background ==
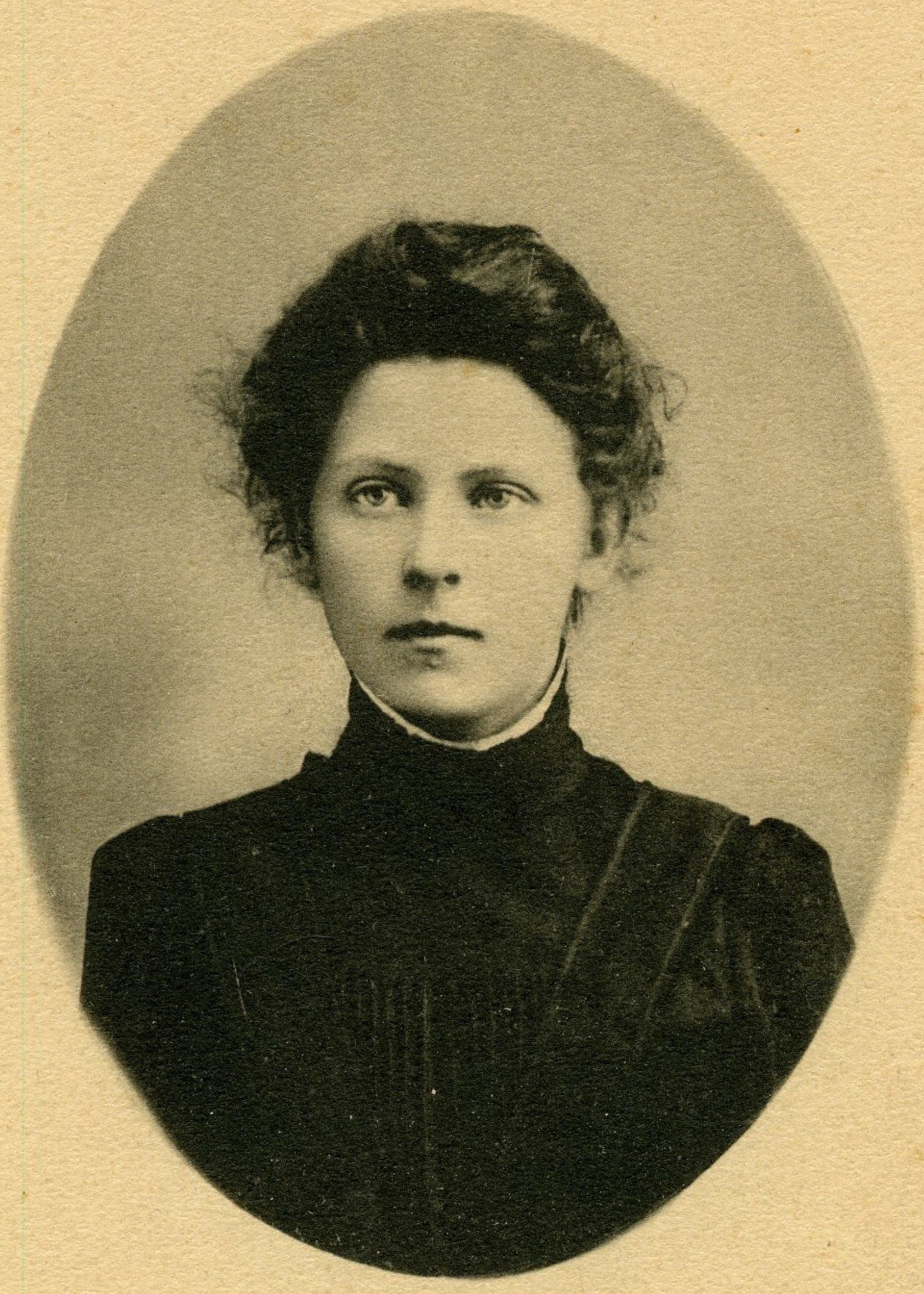
Maria Spiridonova, one of the leaders of the Left Socialist Revolutionaries.

The revolt was led by the Left Socialist-Revolutionaries in Moscow. Previously, the Socialist Revolutionary Party had supported the continuation of the war by the Provisional Government after the February Revolution of 1917. The Bolshevik Party came to power in November 1917 through the simultaneous election in the soviets and an organized uprising supported by military mutiny. Several of the main reasons the population supported the Bolsheviks were to end the war and have a social revolution, exemplified by the slogan "Peace, Land, Bread". The Bolsheviks invited left SRs and Martov's Menshevik Internationalists to join the government. Left SRs split from the main SR party and joined the Bolshevik coalition government, supporting the immediate enactment of the Socialist Revolutionary Party's land redistribution program. The Left SRs were given four Commissar positions and high posts within the Cheka, and their leader Maria Spiridonova was appointed head of the Peasant Section of the Central Executive Committee of the All-Russian Soviet of Workers', Peasants', and Soldiers' Deputies (VTsIK), making her nominally a chief official over peasant affairs. The Left SRs still diverged with the Bolsheviks on the issue of the war and were dismayed that the Treaty of Brest-Litovsk gave up large amounts of territory in Eastern Europe to the Central Powers. With the treaty, the Left SRs considered that the opportunity to spread the revolution throughout Europe had been lost. They left the Council of People's Commissars in protest in March 1918 and at the 4th Congress of Soviets they voted against the treaty. Although they continued to work in the Cheka, which played a decisive role in rebellion. Left Social Revolutionaries remained on the boards of the People's Commissars, the military department, various committees, commissions, and councils.

In Finland, where the soviet government had pledged by the treaty not to intervene, the landing of German troops significantly helped the "white" (counter-revolutionary) forces to crush the Finnish Revolution. In Ukraine, a puppet government, the Hetmanate, had been established with German backing. The forces of the Central Powers advanced through Ukraine towards Rostov-on-Don while Ottoman units made it into the Caucasus. In March, Allied troops landed in Murmansk and reached the Russian Far East the next month. In late May, clashes between the Russians and the Czechoslovak Legion began, and in June rival anti-Bolshevik governments were formed in Samara (the Komuch) and Omsk (the Provisional Siberian Government). The Left SRs strongly objected to the invasion and opposed Trotsky's insistence that nobody was allowed to attack German troops in Ukraine. Sergey Mstislavsky coined the slogan "It's not a war, it's an uprising!", calling on the "masses" to "rebel" against the German-Austrian occupation forces, accusing the Bolsheviks of creating a "state that obstructs the working class", moving away from the position of revolutionary socialism onto the path of opportunistic service to the state."

A new surge of tension was associated with an increase in the activity of the Bolsheviks in rural villages, when the Bolshevik-controlled government announced, by decree, the enforcement of a state bread monopoly and the organization of "food detachments" for the compulsory collection of bread. On 14 June 1918, representatives of the right and centre Socialist-Revolutionaries and the Mensheviks were expelled from the All-Russian Central Executive Committee by a Bolshevik decree. By this same decree, all Soviets of workers, soldiers, peasants, and Cossack deputies were also invited to remove representatives of these parties from their midst. Vladimir Karelin, a member of the Central Committee of the Left SRs, called this decree illegal, since only the All-Russian Congress of Soviets could change the composition of the All-Russian Central Executive Committee. In early July, the Third Congress of the Left Socialist Revolutionary Party was held, in its resolution to the present moment sharply condemned the policy of the Bolsheviks:

Increased centralization, crowning the system of bureaucratic bodies with a dictatorship, the use of requisition units operating outside the control and leadership of local Soviets, the cultivation of poor committees – all these measures create a campaign on the Soviets of peasant deputies, disorganize workers' Soviets, and confuse class relations in the countryside, creating a disastrous front between the cities and villages.

According to Richard Pipes,

[...] the Left Socialist Revolutionaries suddenly discovered that they were cooperating with a regime of prudent politicians who make deals with Germany and the countries of the Fourth Accord and again called on the "bourgeoisie" to manage factories and command the army. What happened to the revolution? Everything that the Bolsheviks did after February 1918 did not suit the Left Socialist Revolutionaries... In the spring of 1918, the Left SRs began to treat the Bolsheviks in the same way that the Bolsheviks themselves treated the Provisional Government and democratic socialists in 1917. They declared themselves the conscience of the revolution, an incorruptible alternative to the regime of opportunists and supporters of compromise. As the influence of the Bolsheviks among industrial workers diminished, the Left Socialist Revolutionaries became more and more dangerous rivals for them, for they appealed to the very anarchist and destructive instincts of the Russian masses, on which the Bolsheviks relied while they came to power, but, having gained power, tried to suppress in every way ... In fact, the Left Socialist Revolutionaries appealed to those groups that helped the Bolsheviks seize power in October and now felt that they had been betrayed.

== Fifth Congress of Soviets ==
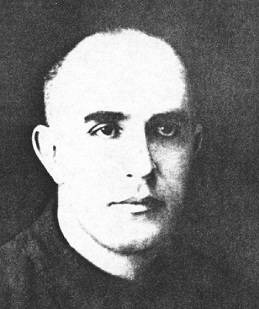
Boris Kamkov, one the main leaders of the Left SRs

In this situation of internal tension, on 4 July, the 5th All-Russian Congress of Soviets began to decide the country's policy. The confrontation between the SRs and Bolsheviks was harsh. Left SR speakers fiercely attacked the policy of the Bolsheviks, from the requisitioning of grain and suppression of opposition parties, to the institution of the death penalty. They argued especially against the Bolshevik peace with imperialist Germany and the lack of defense of the revolution in Ukraine and Finland. Boris Kamkov promised to "sweep food detachments from the villages." Maria Spiridonova characterized the Bolsheviks as "traitors to the revolution" and "successors to the policy of the Kerensky government." The Left SRs also called for proportional representation in the elections of the Soviets, due to the sharp vote disparity between rural and city-dwelling workers. However, the Bolsheviks had sent a large number of delegates who were suspected of not being legitimately elected, simply to achieve a large majority in Congress. The Left Socialist-Revolutionaries had 352 delegates compared to 745 Bolsheviks out of 1132 total. The vast Bolshevik majority thwarted the socialist-revolutionary plans to change government policy in Congress, which was now firmly in the hands of Lenin's party.

As soon as the Congress of Soviets opened at the Bolshoi, the Bolsheviks and Left Socialist Revolutionaries immediately grabbed each other's throats. Speakers from the Left Socialist Revolutionaries accused the Bolsheviks of betraying the cause of the revolution and of fomenting war between town and country, while the Bolsheviks, in turn, reproached them for trying to provoke a war between Russia and Germany. Left Socialist-Revolutionaries proposed to express no confidence in the Bolshevik government, denounce the Brest-Litovsk Treaty and declare war on Germany. When this proposal was rejected by the Bolshevik majority, the Left Socialist Revolutionaries left the congress.

This disillusionment felt by the Left SRs, the sense of danger in the face of the Bolshevik threats – embodied in Trotsky's resolution that allowed the execution of those who opposed the German occupation of Ukraine – and the conviction that a terrorist action could force the start of new hostilities with Germany led the socialist-revolutionary leadership to plot the murder of the German ambassador in Moscow. The SR's objective was not to challenge the Bolsheviks, but to force the Sovnarkom to confront the Germans; the left SRs preferred to achieve this through motions of congress, but, once this route was exhausted, the SRs resumed the decision to carry out the Assassinations. Knowledge of the plans was confined to only a few members of the central committee: neither the delegates of the Soviet congress, nor those of the party congress, nor the Cheka's lieutenant himself, Vyacheslav Aleksandrovich, received any communication about the resolution of the central committee.

== Assassination of Mirbach ==
In their meeting on 24 June, the Central Committee of the Left SR internationalists, having discussed the present political situation of the Republic, found that in the interests of the Russian and international revolution it was necessary to put an end to the so-called "respite", which was created due to the ratification of the Brest-Litovsk treaty by the Bolshevik government. To this end, the Party Central Committee considered it both possible and appropriate to organize a series of terrorist acts against prominent representatives of German imperialism. At the same time, the Central Committee of the Party decided to organize a mobilization of reliable military forces for its decision and to make every effort to ensure that both the working peasantry and the working class joined the uprising and actively supported the party. To this end, to coincide with terrorist acts, an announcement was published in the newspapers of the Left SR's participation in recent Ukrainian events, such as agitation and the destruction of weapons arsenals.

On 25 June 1918, Count Mirbach informed his boss, State Secretary of the German Foreign Ministry Richard von Kühlmann about the deep political crisis of the Bolshevik government: "Today, after more than 2 months of careful observation, I don't think I can make a more favorable diagnosis of Bolshevism: we, no doubt, are at the bedside of a seriously ill patient; and although moments of apparent improvement are possible, ultimately it is doomed." In May, he sent a telegraph to Berlin saying "the Entente allegedly spends huge sums to bring the right wing of the Socialist Revolutionary Party to power and resume the war... Sailors on ships... are probably bribed, like the former Preobrazhensky regiment. Weapons stocks... from weapons factories in the hands of the Socialist Revolutionaries." German diplomat Carl von Botmer also testified that the German embassy, beginning in mid-June 1918, repeatedly received threats that the Bolshevik security service had investigated, but to no avail.

Yakov Blumkin, a Left SR in charge of the Cheka counter-espionage section dedicated to monitoring the activity of the Germans, and Nikolai Andreyev, a photographer the same section, received an order from Maria Spiridonova on 4 July, to carry out the assassination of the German ambassador in two days time. The day of the uprising was chosen, among other reasons, because it was the Latvian national holiday Ivanov Day (Jāņi), which was supposed to neutralize the Latvian units most loyal to the Bolsheviks. The Leadership of the Left SRs believed this assassination would lead to a widespread popular uprising in support of their aims. They claimed to be leading a revolt against the peace with Germany and not necessarily against the Bolsheviks and soviet power.

On 6 July 1918, at about 1:00 PM, a member of the Left SR central committee, probably Maria Spiridonova, handed over weapons and instructions to the assassins. Blumkin and Andreyev hid the pistols and grenades in briefcases and drove in a Cheka car to the German embassy, where they arrived at 2:15 PM. They showed forged papers, supposedly signed by the head of Cheka Felix Dzerzhinsky, and asked to see the German envoy. Mirbach believed that the Chekists were coming to inform him of a plan to assassinate him, a plan he had been warned about earlier. During their conversation - at about 2:50 PM, Blumkin drew up a revolver and shot at Count Mirbach, Dr. Kurt Riezler, and the interpreter, Lt. Mueller, but failed to injure any of them. Riezler and Mueller took shelter under a large table, whereas Mirbach, who tried to run from the room, was then shot by Andreyev, with the lethal bullet entering through the back of his head and exiting near the nose.

The assassins threw grenades to create confusion and lept from a window, with Blumkin fracturing a leg in the jump. The pair fled and disappeared in a car that was waiting for them in front of the embassy, heading straight for a Cheka HQ (under the command of Dmitry Popov) where the Left SR central committee was waiting. They made many mistakes during the assassination: they left a briefcase at the scene containing certificates in the name of Blumkin and Andreyev; Riezler and Mueller, witnesses to the murder, also survived. In the turmoil, Blumkin and Andreyev even left their caps at the embassy.

That same afternoon, Lenin had sent some of the few remaining forces in the city to the northeast, to try to quell the Yaroslavl uprising, which had just broken out. Only a few Latvian marksmen units, Cheka forces and some Red Guard and Army units (still in training), remained in Moscow. Lenin received the news shortly after, not knowing who had perpetrated the attack, and immediately went to the embassy to apologize for the murder and try to calm the Germans. Later that night, when going to give condolences to the embassy, Dzerzhinski indicated that the authors were socialist-revolutionary members of the Cheka. At the same time, the Foreign Commissioner, Georgy Chicherin, communicated to him the German demand to station troops in Moscow.

A few weeks later, on 30 July, the commander of German occupation forces Hermann von Eichhorn was assassinated in Kiev, by the Left SR Boris Donskoy.

== First skirmishes ==
Dzerzhinsky personally appeared at the headquarters of the Left Socialist-Revolutionary Cheka detachment and demanded the extradition of Mirbach's killers. Accompanied by three Chekists, Dzerzhinsky began to search the premises, breaking several doors. At this point, the Central Committee of the Left SRs left the Congress of Soviets, which was taking place at that time, and began a meeting at the headquarters of the Popov detachment, where Dzerzhinsky discovered it. Dzerzhinsky threatened to shoot almost the entire Left SR Central Committee, announced the arrest of the Left Socialist-Revolutionary Commissars Proshyan and Karelin and demanded Popov immediately extradite Blumkin, threatening to shoot him on the spot in case of refusal. However, Dzerzhinsky himself was arrested and taken hostage by the Left Socialist Revolutionaries, to ensure the SR delegates to the Soviet congress.

The main armed force that the Socialist-Revolutionaries could make use of was the Cheka detachment under the command of Popov. This detachment consisted mostly of Finns and sailors, numbering about 800 people, and was armed with several guns and armored cars. However, Popov's detachment did not take action, and the defense of the occupied positions was reduced to sitting out in two buildings of Trekhsvyatitelsky Lane. Subsequently, in 1921, during interrogation at the Cheka, Popov claimed that: "I didn't take part in the preparation of the alleged uprising against the state, the armed clash in Trekhsvyatitelsky Lane was an act of self-defense."

In total, during the mutiny, the Left Socialist Revolutionaries took 27 Bolshevik functionaries hostage, including the deputy chairman of the Cheka Martin Latsis and the chairman of the Moscow City Council Pyotr Smidovich. In addition, they captured several cars, and a congress delegate Nikolai Abelman was killed. They also captured the General Post Office and began to send out anti-Bolshevik appeals. One of these appeals, declaring the Bolshevik government deposed and ordering "not to execute orders of Lenin and Sverdlov", according to the command of the Kremlin Bolshevik Pavel Dmitrievich Malkov, fell into the hands of Lenin. Another appeal stated that "... the executioner Mirbach was killed ... German spies and armed provocateurs have invaded Moscow, demanding the death of the left-wing socialist revolutionaries. Frightened by possible consequences, as before, the ruling party of the Bolsheviks are following the orders of the German executioners ... Forward, workers, workers and Red Army soldiers, to defend the working people, against all executioners, against all spies and provocative imperialism. " By this time, the leader of the Left Socialist Revolutionaries, Maria Spiridonova, who had come to the Congress of Soviets, had already been arrested by the Bolsheviks herself and also taken hostage.

Lenin thought that the whole Cheka had rebelled. According to the testimony of Vladimir Bonch-Bruyevich, Lenin "did not even turn pale, but turned white" when he heard the news. Of all the units of the Moscow garrison, the Bolsheviks were able to rely only on the Latvian Riflemen — all the other units either sided with the rebels or declared their neutrality. Trotsky's order to units of the Moscow garrison to speak out against the rebels was carried out only by the Commandant Regiment and the School of Military Cadets, and the Commandant Regiment soon fled.

In the midst of events, Lenin doubted the loyalty of the commander of the Latvian Riflemen, Jukums Vācietis, and expressed his readiness to "accept his services" only by assigning four commissioners to him. During the uprising Trotsky investigated four times whether Vācietis had joined the Left Socialist Revolutionaries. At night, Lenin ordered him to gather forces to launch a counterattack. By the early morning of 7 July, the Bolsheviks had gathered enough forces, mainly Vācietis's Latvian Riflemen, to start their counterattack. At about 10:00 a.m., they set up their artillery only two hundred yards in front of the building where Popov's unit was located. After an unsuccessful negotiation attempt, the Latvians opened fire. The very first salvos hit the Left SR headquarters, after which the Left SR Central Committee left the building at once.

Lenin decided to demonstrate to the Germans that the Bolsheviks could control the Socialist Revolutionaries, despite having lost control of the local Cheka. Lenin accused the SRs of trying to overthrow the Soviet Government and charged Trotsky with crushing the rebellion who, in turn, put Ivar Smilga in command of the forces faithful to the Bolsheviks. For a while, Lenin, Sverdlov and Trotsky declared the Cheka dismissed, ousted Dzerzhinsky and put Latsis in his place, who was ordered to recruit new people to the Cheka. Trotsky ordered Latsis to arrest all the Left Socialist Revolutionaries serving in the Cheka, and declare them hostages. However, soon the Left Socialist-Revolutionaries themselves occupied the Cheka's building, arresting Latsis and freeing the Left Socialist Revolutionary Emelyanov, whom had been arrested. Also unsuccessful was Trotsky's attempt to prevent the rebels from seizing the central telegraph; the two companies of Latvian riflemen sent to them there were disarmed by the group of Left Socialist Revolutionaries led by Prosh Proshian. For a short time the Left SRs controlled the telephone exchange and telegraph office. They sent out several manifestos, bulletins, and telegrams in the name of the Left S.R. Central Committee declaring that the Left S.R.s had taken over power and that their action had been welcomed by the whole nation. A telegram from the Left SR Central Committee stating that the Left SRs had seized power in Moscow, was sent to Mikhail Artemyevich Muravyov, a Left SR and Commander of the Eastern Front. On the pretext of attacking the Germans, he seized Simbirsk and tried to march his forces on Moscow in support of the left socialist revolutionaries. However, Muravyov could not convince his troops to oppose the Bolsheviks and was killed when arrested.

The leader of the Left Socialist-Revolutionaries Maria Spiridonova then went to the Fifth Congress of Soviets, where she announced that "the Russian people are free from Mirbach," and, jumping onto a table, started shouting "Hey, you, listen, Earth, hey, you, listen, earth! ". However, the Left Socialist Revolutionaries made no attempt to arrest the Bolshevik government, although they even had passes allowing them to enter the Kremlin without hindrance. In addition, the rebels did not arrest the Bolshevik delegates of the Fifth Congress of Soviets. Without attempting to seize power, they declared the Bolsheviks "agents of German imperialism" who established the regime of "commissar rule" and smeared all other socialists as "counterrevolutionaries". Researcher Valery Evgenievich Shambarov draws attention to the passivity of military units that sided with the rebels: "The regiment of the Cheka, under the command of Popov, rebelled quite strangely. On 1 March, their forces were armed with 1,800 bayonets, 80 sabers, 4 armored cars and 8 artillery guns. The Bolsheviks in Moscow had 720 bayonets, 4 armored cars and 12 artillery guns. But instead of attacking and winning, taking advantage of surprise and an almost three-fold advantage, the regiment passively "rebelled" in the barracks ". On the same topic American historian Alexander Rabinowitch argues as follows.

By the night of 6 July, the actions of the Left SRs, beginning with Count Mirbach's assassination, were already being defined by the Soviet government as "an uprising against Soviet power," and historians have often depicted the episode that way. But is this characterization valid? Having sifted through the available published and unpublished evidence, I conclude that it was not. Upon investigation, with the possible exception of Prosh Proshian's brief occupation of the Central Telegraph Office and his behavior there, which may as well have been unauthorized, all of the Moscow Left SRs' actions following Mirbach's assassination were consistent with the objective of reshaping the policies of the Leninist Sovnarkom but not with forcibly seizing power or even fighting the Bolsheviks except in self-defense.

== Clashes ==
=== Fighting in Moscow ===
Shortly after the assassination, Lenin ordered Yakov Peters to put under guard the whole Left SR faction of the Fifth Congress of Soviets (approximately 450 people). The Bolshoi Theatre, where the session of Congress took place, was surrounded by chekists and Latvian riflemen. Bolshevik delegates of Congress were allowed to leave the theater, while Left SRs were arrested inside the theater. Despite sympathy on the part of the Moscow garrison for the SRs, the Bolsheviks mustered enough forces on the morning of 7 July to storm their positions, thanks especially to the support of the Latvian Riflemen, who remained loyal to the Bolsheviks. In the Bolshoi, Maria Spiridonova and Andrei Kolegayev severely reproached Trotsky for their confinement and for the measures taken against their comrades. Trotsky responded by accusing the Socialist Revolutionaries of having risen to take power.

After a vain attempt to stop the clash, pro-Bolshevik units attacked the SRs. The first assault, scheduled for 2:00 a.m., was a failure. Being a Sunday and a public holiday – St. John the Baptist's day – the troops assigned to the assault did not show up and forced it to be carried out the next day, instead of taking advantage of the night, as originally planned. The attack finally started at noon with the use of artillery against the Cheka headquarters, which was badly damaged by the explosions. Around 2:00 p.m., the revolt had been put down and the SR leaders had fled, abandoning Dzerzhinski in the building. Of the defenders, the assailants ended up capturing about four hundred. Aleksandrovich, captured shortly thereafter at a nearby railway station, was executed the next day, along with twelve Chekists from Popov's unit who had participated in the uprising.

=== Actions in Petrograd ===
In Petrograd, 7 July dawned warm and sunny, the streets were filled with people. The press only picked up two lines about the murder of the German ambassador in Moscow, sent before communications with the capital were cut off. The night before, the few Bolshevik leaders who had remained in the city and had not attended the Fifth Soviet Congress in Moscow received the order to prepare for an uprising of the Left SRs and they immediately formed a revolutionary military committee. They decided to disarm the main Left SR armed detachment in the city, close down their main newspaper and try to arrest the local Left SR committee. They also ordered the formation of Bolshevik troikas in the different districts of the city, these were to neutralize and disarm the socialist revolutionaries of the respective districts. The Bolshevik authorities in Petrograd knew about the murder of the German ambassador before even the local socialist revolutionaries.

Moisei Uritsky arrived in Petrograd around 15:00 on 7 July and immediately took over the leadership of the revolutionary military committee. He relieved Prosh Proshian from the regional Commissariat of Interior and accelerated the release of the Administration's socialist-revolutionary positions. Forces loyal to the Bolsheviks surrounded the offices of the socialist-revolutionaries in Smolny and closed them at 14:00, while the Socialist Revolutionary delegation of the Petrograd Soviet was arrested. Then the city's Social Revolutionary Committee, alerted to the likelihood of government actions to disarm and arrest his forces, alerted them and went underground. Ignorant of the Moscow events, local organizations were stunned by the instructions. Confused by the unexpected events, pro-socialist forces offered no resistance to disarmament and the only victims of the disarmament process were by accident, when a grenade exploded causing four deaths and fourteen injuries.

The only confrontation in the city took place at the School of Pages, where the scarce garrison, just 350–380 mercenary soldiers, most of them teenagers and without sympathy for the Left SRs, attracted to the building's guard by the better conditions than the front, defended the place. At 17:00, communications to the building were counted and they began to surround themselves, while government patrols began to walk the main avenues of the city The military committee tried unsuccessfully to achieve the surrender of the besieged. After a first unsuccessful assault, the talks between the two sides resumed, without ceasing the fighting. They attracted a crowd, curious to see what was happening in the area. At 19:00, new troops surrounded the building and brought machine guns; the main assault occurred about an hour later, using artillery and machine guns against the besieged. The shelling accelerated the defectors' defection. The fighting ended around 21:00 when the few remaining defenders hoisted a white towel from one of the windows of the building. After a surrender agreement guaranteeing the safety of the defenders, about 150 of them surrendered to the troops, who entered the building a little later.

== Repression of the SRs ==
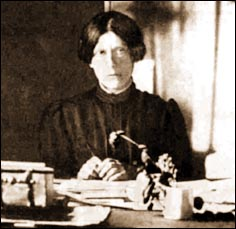
Maria Spiridonova

The Bolsheviks immediately executed thirteen SRs that were in the Cheka, without trial, while keeping the SR Congressional delegation in prison and expelling its members from the executive committee. Little by little they released the bulk of the delegates. Those who opposed the uprising were immediately released, after their weapons had been seized. Thirteen of the four hundred and fifty delegates - including Spiridonova - were transferred on the morning of 8 July from the theater to the Kremlin dungeons; ten of them were released the next day.

The Communists tried to divide the party and alienate the militants from the leadership, by having some form two separate new parties. Most of the radical leaders who had advocated accepting peace with the Central Powers ended up repudiating the uprising. Those who, instead of criticizing the actions of the party, endorsed them, were persecuted by the authorities. Despite the flight of most of the leaders, some four hundred Party members were arrested and some of them executed. Spiridonova remained in prison in the Kremlin until the end of November. She received a one-year sentence, which was commuted by her admission to a sanitarium, from which she soon escaped.

The Bolsheviks began to expel SRs from the institutions and took their offices in Petrograd on the morning of 7 July after a brief fight, despite the fact that there had been no incidents in the city. The party's two main newspapers, Znamia trudá and Golos trudovogo krestianstva , were closed and did not receive permission to resume publication. On 9 July, the Soviets Congress continued its sessions, without the Left SR delegates. It condemned the uprising as an attempt by the Left SRs to take power, approved the government's actions to crush the revolt and expelled left-wing Socialist Revolutionaries who did not condemn the actions of their central committee from the Soviets. Grigory Petrovsky, Commissioner of the Interior, nevertheless ordered the expulsion of the Social Revolutionaries from all local soviets, regardless of whether or not they condemned the actions approved by the PSRI central committee. In Petrograd, Left SR representatives were expelled from the leadership of the Petrograd Soviet and from then on their influence over the organisation was nonexistent.

Mirbach's assassination was attempted, in vain, to force the Bolsheviks to resume the fight against Germany, once the impossibility of having a majority in Congress that allowed them to change the government's policy in a peaceful way was clear. Despite the government's accusation of the Left SR's attempted overthrow of the Soviet government, the Cheka's own investigation in Petrograd ended without any evidence being found and with the release of those arrested.

Much the same conclusions have also been reached by British historian Orlando Figes, who generally holds up to ridicule the Left SRs' naive tendency 'to play at revolution'.

The Left SRs ... were much less interested in seizing power themselves than they were in calling for a popular uprising to force the Bolsheviks to change their policies. The Left SRs had no idea where this uprising would end up; they were happy to leave that to the 'revolutionary creativity of the masses'. They were the 'poets of the revolution' and, like all poets, were anarchists at heart.
[...] And yet the Left SRs were defeated less by [Vācietis and his Latvian Riflemen] than they were by themselves. As their own party comrade Steinberg put it, they were beaten 'not because their leaders were not brave enough, but because it was not at all their purpose to overthrow the government'.

— Orlando Figes, A People's Tragedy: A History of the Russian Revolution, Viking, 1997, pp. 634–635

== Consequences ==
The assassination of the ambassador led to a serious but short-lived crisis between the Lenin government and the German Empire. As the Bolshevik leaders feared, on 14 July the acting ambassador demanded the sending of troops to Moscow on the pretext of protecting the embassy, which would have placed the Sovnarkom under the control of the German high command. The rejection of the German demands, however, seemed to lead to a resumption of hostilities. The start of the Second Battle of the Marne turned German attention to the Western Front and allowed the government to finally reject the German claims in exchange for assigning a thousand Red Guards to protect the embassy, who would share the task with three hundred unarmed and plainclothes German soldiers.

For his part, the Latvian colonel Jukums Vācietis, who had led the assault on the Cheka headquarters in the capital under the command of the main forces loyal to the Bolsheviks, was appointed commander of the Volga front and, later, commander-in-chief of the whole Red Army. According to Orlando Figes he was also rewarded with 10,000 roubles.

Left SR members did not immediately disappear from the institutions due to a lack of cadres, which prevented the Bolsheviks from replacing them with their own supporters. However, they became part of the persecuted opposition, even groups that distanced themselves or broke relations with their central committee did not retain their previous power in the institutions. The increasing measures of repression against the SRs culminated in the trial of the party that began on 27 November. Of the fourteen defendants, only two were present, the rest went underground. All were sentenced to short sentences, but the party was removed from power. The uprising, which ended the alliance between Bolsheviks and left-wing social revolutionaries, was a milestone in the process of forming a one-party state. The murder of the ambassador, contrary to what the socialist-revolutionary leaders expected, frustrated their plans: neither did it bring about the resumption of the conflict with Germany, nor did it cause the expected uprising of the population against it, nor did it serve to bring the left-communists closer together; furthermore, the party was not prepared for the consequences of the attack. It served primarily to facilitate Lenin's removal of political power from the rival party. Despite its strong support in the countryside, the Left SRs never recovered from the repression suffered after the Mirbach murder and disappeared as a notable political option.

The "Party of the Populists-Communists" and "Party of Revolutionary Communism" split from Left SRs and supported the Bolsheviks. The Left SRs collapsed as a party by 1922 and only existed as small cells through 1925. Mirbach's assassins, Blumkin and Andreev, managed to evade capture. In early 1919, Blumkin was pardoned by the Bolsheviks and rejoined the Cheka. During the Moscow Trials in 1937, it was claimed that Trotsky, Kamenev, and Zinoviev were involved in this plot. Yuri Felshtinsky claimed the revolt was staged by the Bolsheviks as a pretext to discredit the Left SRs. However, this was disputed by L. M. Ovrutskii and Anatolii Izrailevich Razgon.

== See also ==
- Bibliography of the Russian Revolution and Civil War
- Outline of the Russian Revolution and Civil War
- Index of articles related to the Russian Revolution and Civil War
- The "Russian" Civil Wars, 1916–1926: Ten Years That Shook the World
- Russia in Flames: War, Revolution, Civil War, 1914–1921
- Russia in Revolution: An Empire in Crisis, 1890 to 1928
- Russia: Revolution and Civil War, 1917—1921
- The Russian Revolution: A New History
- 1st Congress of the Communist Party (Bolshevik) of Ukraine
- 26 Baku Commissars
- Black Guards
- Green Armies
- Explosion in Leontievsky Lane
- Left communism
- Left Opposition
- Permanent Revolution
- World revolution
- War communism
