= Borbysts =

Ukrainian Party of Left Socialist-Revolutionaries (Strugglers) Українська партія лівих соціалістів-революціонерів (борьбистів)
- Leader: Yevgeniy Terletskiy
- Founded: March 1918
- Dissolved: July 1920
- Merged into: Communist Party of Ukraine
- Newspaper: Struggle
- Ideology: Federalism; Revolutionary socialism
- Political position: Left-wing
- National affiliation: Left Socialist-Revolutionaries

Borbysts (Ukrainian: Борьбисти) a brief name for the Ukrainian Party of the Left Socialist Revolutionaries (UPLSR). The exact date of establishment of the party is unknown, while its main newspaper "Trudovaya mysl" declared for its appearance for the first time in February–March 1918. Unlike Borotbists, the Ukrainian Party of the Left Socialist Revolutionaries was created out of its Russian counterpart the Left SRs long after the revolution and after the occupation of Ukraine by the Russian Red Guards forces.

== Program ==
- Organization of the Soviet power in region
- Call for the 2nd All-Ukrainian Congress of Soviets
- Free federative union with the Soviet Russia
- Conducting social reforms such as socialization of land

== Historical background ==
Soon after its establishment the party members emigrated to Moscow due to occupation of Ukraine by the armed forces of Central Powers. In June 1918 the party returned to Odessa for an underground resistance. The main interests of the party were terrorists actions against the regime of Hetman of Ukraine, creation of the party's insurgent squads, revolutionary committees, and cooperation with the Bolsheviks in the so-called "The Nine".

The party was proud in organization of the Hermann von Eichhorn's assassination along with its Russian counterparts. Beside that action the party was preparing assassination of the Hetman, Minister of Land Affairs, and other German and Austrian generals. The 1st Party Congress that took place in September 1918 has officially separated the Ukrainian party from the Russian Left SRs. Other Ukrainian political parties for a long time did not realize in existence of the party. Individual terror against the government officials and representatives of the German command they viewed as unacceptable and non-allowable form of fighting. Therefore, all Ukrainian political parties reacted sharply negatively to killing Eichhorn. Even the Ukrainian press wrote about the incident as the action of Russian SRs alone. Boris Donskoy commemoration was promoted by Borbysts as a decisive moment in downing of the Hetman regime.

The party was organizing its own peasant insurgent squads and created its own Military-Revolutionary Headquarters announcing a major uprising on October 15, 1918. However, with the start of the Ukrainian Civil War the party's forces joined the Ukrainian uprising forces, but were instructed to turn the uprising from "pro-Petliura" to "anti-Petliura".

In July 1920 the 4th congress of the UPLSR voted to disband the party and its members joined the Communist Party of Ukraine; most of them, including their leader Yevgeniy Terletskiy, were liquidated during Stalin's Great Purge.
