= Union of Socialists-Revolutionaries-Maximalists =

Union of Socialists-Revolutionaries-Maximalists Союз социалистов-революционеров-максималистов
- Founded: 1906
- Dissolved: 1919
- Split from: Party of Socialist-Revolutionaries
- Ideology: Revolutionary socialism Maximalism

Union of Socialists-Revolutionaries-Maximalists (Russian: Союз социалистов-революционеров-максималистов) was a political party in the Russian Empire, a radical wing expelled from the Socialist-Revolutionary Party in 1906.

The Union united agrarian terrorists, the 'Moscow Opposition' and other radical dissidents from the PSR in an independent party. The Maximalists officially split off from the PSR at its Second Congress in Imatra in 1906. Maximalists played a role in both the Revolution of 1905 and the Revolution of 1917. Many former SR Maximalists eventually joined the Russian Communist Party (Bolshevik).

== Ideology and history ==
Maximalists were so called because they demanded the full implementation of the 'maximum programme' in the expected revolution: full socialisation of the land, factories and all other means of production. The orthodox Socialist-Revolutionaries wanted to start with land reform but defer socialisation of other means of production. The Maximalists also rejected the PSR's version of a 'two-stage' revolution, a theory associated with V.M. Chernov. According to Chernov, the coming revolution in Russia would not be purely 'bourgeois-democratic' as the Social-Democrats claimed, but would include social and economic as well as political reforms. It would be a 'popular-democratic' revolution, and would transition into a full-blown 'labour-socialist' revolution later on. The Maximalists rejected this as Social-Democratic 'attentism' and argued that the coming Russian revolution would not be able to stop half-way; it was the two-stage theory, not Maximalism, that was unrealistic if it thought the toiling masses, once liberated, would content themselves with a bourgeois republic and gradual reforms.

The SR Maximalists also had a much more favourable view of terror and expropriation. Before the Azef scandal of 1908, the PSR had endorsed 'political terror', i.e., attacks on state officials and members of the ruling royal family. Many future Maximalists had been involved in such attacks, as well as in 'expropriations' (bank robberies and the like). Such methods had always been controversial in the PSR and were discontinued after Yevno Azef, head of the PSR's 'Combat Organization', was unmasked as a secret police agent. The Maximalists, however, argued for a continuation of 'political terror' and also endorsed 'economic terror', meaning attacks on factory bosses, industrialists, bankers, landowners, etc., or their property. Such actions against 'private' individuals were unacceptable to the orthodox SRs, who denounced them as 'lynch justice'. Meanwhile, on the right, the Popular Socialists who defected from the PSR at the same time as the Maximalists, rejected any terrorism.

The Maximalists were often compared to anarchists, with whom they shared a fondness for 'propaganda by the deed' and 'direct action', but they themselves rejected this comparison. They were not opposed to the concept of the state as such and envisaged a popular revolutionary dictatorship. They rejected parliamentary democracy as a mere 'lightning rod of popular discontent' (whereas a parliamentary democracy was one of the cardinal demands of the PSR). The Maximalists claimed that what was needed was a population imbued with a general 'toilers' consciousness' and a small, energetic minority, forming a disciplined secret organisation that would seize power and establish a 'Toilers' Republic'. In these respects, the Maximalists were heirs of Blanqui and Tkachev rather than Bakunin or Kropotkin. (They also foreshadowed future currents and methods in Leninism.) The Maximalists boycotted elections to the tsarist State Duma.

Prominent Maximalists included E.Iu. Lozinsky (pseudonym 'Ustinov', a former contributor to the PSR's journal Revolutionary Russia), M.I. Sokolov, D.V. Vinogradov, V. Mazurin, M.M. Engelgard (Alexandrovich) and others. Lozinsky was one of the Maximalists' leading theorists and editor of Volniy Disskussioniy Listok (Free Discussion Reader), the group's journal. Sokolov, a charismatic peasant organiser and experienced bank robber and extortionist, was the principal leader of the group and was accepted as a 'born dictator' by his followers. The Maximalists initially received some support from established Socialist-Revolutionary leaders like Ekaterina Breshkovskaya and N.I. Rakitnikov (Maximov), but ultimately, the differences between Maximalism and orthodox Socialist-Revolutionary ideology were too great.

In 1906–07, the 'Union of Socialist-Revolutionary Maximalists' (SSRM) was founded as an independent political party. In theory it was devoted to revolutionary agitation among workers and peasants for an immediate socialist revolution; in practice, much of its energy was directed to fundraising by criminal means and to violence against state officials, capitalists and landowners.

In the aftermath of the failed Revolution of 1905–07, the Maximalists were decimated by arrests, but with difficulty they remained in existence as a distinct revolutionary current until 1917, when they participated in the soviets. Always more given to 'action' than to 'theory', the Maximalists soon splintered; some allied with the Left SRs, others joined the Bolsheviks (who had shed their attachment to the Social-Democratic 'two-stage' theory and were in the process of establishing a radical revolutionary dictatorship of sorts). Some Maximalists, however, opposed the Bolsheviks and engaged in anti-Bolshevik actions during the Civil War.

Maximalist Klara Klebanova published her memoirs of working in the fighting brigade in the Forward newspaper in 1922.

== Sources ==
- Hildermeier, M., The Russian Socialist Revolutionary Party Before the First World War. New York, 2000. Ch. 4: 'The Maximalist Heresy' is very informative.
- Avrich, P.H., and K. Kebanova, 'The Last Maximalist: An Interview with Klara Klebanova'. Russian Review Vol. 32, No. 4 (Oct., 1973), pp. 413–420 (Blackwell).
- The Great Soviet Encyclopedia. Moscow, 1979.
