= Trud, Zemlia i More =

Russian Trudovik newspaper of 1917

Trud, Zemlia i More (Russian: Труд, земля и море, 'Labour, Land and Sea'), later Trud i Zemlia (Russian: Труд и земля, 'Labour and Land'), was a Trudovik newspaper published from Kronstadt, Russia in 1917. The newspaper was published between April 22, 1917 and November 26, 1917. 180 issues of the newspaper were published during the course of 1917. Whilst the Trudovniks represented the far-right in the revolutionary fervour of Kronstadt, Trud, Zemlia i More had a prominent profile (the Trudoviks and Popular Socialists had very little following within the Baltic Fleet and no presence in base soviets, but did count of civilian support from the town population).

The newspaper was launched as a replacement of the pre-revolutionary newspaper Kotlin, which published its last issue on April 21, 1917. The initial editorial team consisted of A.K. Tachkov (Secretary of the Food Commission of the Kronstadt Soviet), A.P. Skobennikov (Food Commission chairman), and A.F. Pervaya. The first issue of the newspaper carried the motto 'In labour and struggle we will gain your right', a modified version of a Socialist-Revolutionary slogan. The front page carried the descriptions 'Organ of the Labour Socialist Union' and 'Daily newspaper for the political and economic life in Kronstadt'. Tachkov served as editor of the newspaper for the first ten issues.

Several prominent leaders of the Petrograd Soviet sent congratulatory messages to Trud, Zemlia i More for its first issue, such as Petrograd Soviet chairman Nikolay Chkheidze, Irakli Tsereteli, Matvey Skobelev and Nikolay Sokolov. The Bundist leader Mikhail Liber also sent a congratulatory message, published in its April 25, 1917 edition.

On June 1, 1917 the name of the newspaper was changed to Trud i Zemlia ('Labour and Land'). The decision to change the name of the publication was taken at a meeting of the Kronstadt Labour Socialist Union, at which the organization proclaimed its allegiance to the Labour Socialist Party. Furthermore, when the Labour Socialist Party (Trudoviks) and the Popular Socialists merged in June 1917, the newspaper became the organ of the Kronstadt branch of the Labour People's Socialist Party. The local leader of the merged party and new editor of the newspaper was A.E. Hanuch.

Trud i Zemlia exchanged sharp polemics with the Bolshevik organ Golos Pravdy, the latter personally targeted Hanuch in its writings. On August 18 the workers at the Kronstadt Marine Plant, the Emergency Docks and other enterprises in Kronstadt adopted resolutions at their respective meetings calling for a protest against the attacks of the counter-revolutionary press, such as Trud i Zemlia and Kopeika.

N.S. Kolinin and A.R. Prekrach served as editors for Trud i Zemlia between issues 106 and 156.
