= Andronikashvili =

Princely family in Georgia

Coat of arms of the Princes Andronikov (Andronikashvili) in the Russian Empire (1826)

The House of Andronikashvili (Georgian: ანდრონიკაშვილები), sometimes known as Endronikashvili (ენდრონიკაშვილები), was a Georgian noble family that played a prominent role in the political, military and religious life of Georgia from the Middle Ages to the 20th century. After the Imperial Russia annexed Georgia starting in 1801, the Andronikashvili were confirmed in the dignity of knyaz (Prince) Andronikov (Russian: Андрониковы) in 1826.

== Origin ==
The surname Andronikashvili, meaning "children [descendants] of Andronikos", is attested in sixteenth-century documents, but oral tradition has it that the family descends from Alexios Komnenos (c. 1170–1199), the illegitimate son of the Eastern Roman emperor Andronikos I Komnenos (ruled 1183-1185) by his mistress and relative Theodora Komnene, Queen Dowager of Jerusalem. After the deposition and brutal murder of emperor Andronikos, Alexios is said to have taken refuge at the court of his relative Tamar of Georgia, who granted him an estate in the eastern Georgian province of Kakheti. Despite the fragmentary nature of this Andronikashvili pedigree, Professor Cyril Toumanoff (1976) accepted it as plausible, but evidence marshaled by Kuršankis (1977) suggests that it may be only a legend. Toumanoff has also assumed that the line of the "provincial kings" of Alastani (c. 1230—1348), known from Georgian sources and including the one named Andronike, may have belonged to the Georgian Komnenoi/Andronikashvili.

== Status and possessions ==
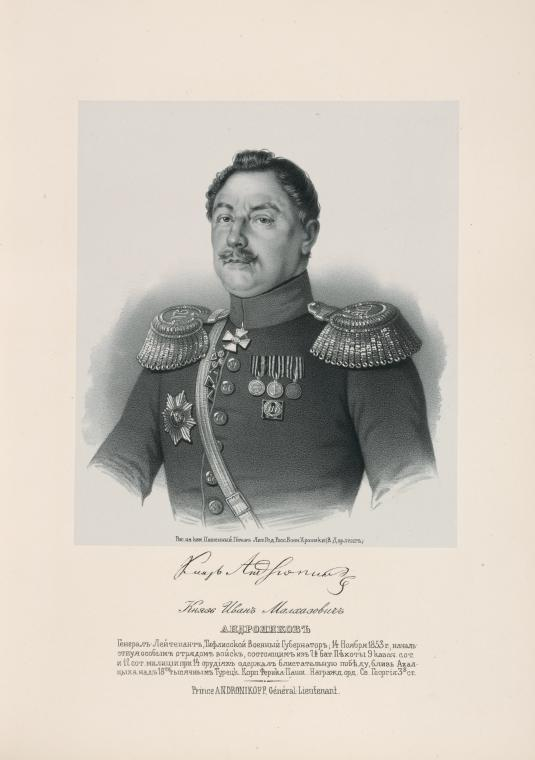
General Ivane Andronikashvili, the family's most notable 19th-century member

The Andronikashvili family estates were located in the southeastern portion of Kakheti, one of the three kingdoms that emerged after the demise of a unified Kingdom of Georgia later in the fifteenth century. Their aboriginal appanage was known as "Saandroniko" (საანდრონიკო) or "Saendroniko" (საენდრონიკო) and comprised several villages including Melaani, Chalaubani, and Pkhoveli. In the sixteenth century, the family acquired the office of High Constable (mouravi) of K’iziqi which became hereditary in the main line (sometimes known as Abelashvili, აბელაშვილები). A century later, a branch (also known as Zurabashvili, ზურაბაშვილები) attained to a similar position in Martqopi.

Along with the Cholokashvili and Abashidze families, the Andronikashvili were regarded as grandees of the first class of the Kingdom of Kakheti. They held key political, diplomatic and military posts at the court and were distinguished for their particular loyalty to the royal Bagrationi dynasty with which they had ties of marriage. In the 1780s, they functioned as military governors of Ganja Khanate which was briefly subjugated by King Erekle II to Georgian control. Several representatives of the family served also as bishops of Bodbe, Ninotsminda, Alaverdi and Nekresi.

After the Russian annexation of Georgia (1801), the Andronikashvili were confirmed in the dignity of knyaz in 1826 and mostly served in the Russian army.

Following the Bolshevik takeover in the 1917 October Revolution, the head of the family, Jesse Andronikashvili (Andronikov), managed to send his family to France, while he himself spent several years in Soviet prisons before being shot in 1937. His son, Constantin Andronikof (1916–1997) became a French diplomat, the Dean of St. Sergius Orthodox Theological Institute in Paris, and translator of Sergei Bulgakov's theological writings into French.

== Family tree of the main princely line ==
Garsevan; Andronikashvili
Ketevan, daughter of Erekle I	Abel	Melkisedek
Paata (?—1712)	Kaikhosro	Iase
David (Datuna)	Simon	Papuna (Papua)	Zurab
Paata	George XII of Georgia	Ketevan (1754—1782)	Melkisedek	Solomon (? — c. 1826)
Mzechabuk	Kaikhosro	Ioseb (1765—?)	Melkisedek (Malkhaz) (1773—1822)	Mariam, sister of Solomon II of Imereti
Paata (1799—1840)	Simon-Zosime (?—1819)	Barbara (1769—1801)	Ivan (1786—1848)
Alexander (1838—?)	Tamaz (Toma) (1786—?)	Iase (1798—1863)	Ivane (1796—1868)	Abel (1825—1870)
Giorgi (1875—1911)	Dimitri (1819—?)	Zakaria (1829—1905)	Mikheil (Mimusha) (1852—1882)
Nato (1904—1953)	Kira (1909—1960)	Ivane (1852—?)	Nikoloz (Ivane) (1863—1944)	Mikheil (1875—1919)
Alexander (1901—1940)	Iase (1893—1937)
Inesa (Inna) (b. 1937)	Constantine (1916—1997)

== Notable members ==
- Zakaria Andronikashvili (c. 1740–1800), military commander
- Zaal Andronikashvili (died 1803), military commander
- Ivane Andronikashvili (1798–1868), general in the Russian service
- Ivane Andronikashvili (1862-1947), agronomist, viticulturalist
- Salomea Andronikova (1888–1982), socialite
- Alexander Andronikashvili (1892–1923), anti-Soviet guerrilla leader
- Konstantine Andronikashvili (1876 – 1937), Georgian politician and member of anti-Soviet resistance
- Elepter Andronikashvili (1910–1989), physicist
- Irakly Andronikov (1908–1990), historian, philologist and media personality
- Constantin Andronikof (1916–1997), diplomat in the French service and a major French translator of Russian religious thought
- Rati Andronikashvili (2001-), a member of the Georgian national basketball team.

== See also ==
- List of Georgian princely families
