= Alexander Halpern =

Aleksandr Yakovelich Galpern (Russian: Александр Яковлевич Гальперн; 1879—28 June 1956), also known as Alexander Halpern, was a Russian Menshevik politician and attorney, who played a significant part in the Russian Revolution. He was a member of the Grand Orient of the Peoples of Russia and sat in Alexander Kerensky's Russian Provisional Government. Following the October Revolution, he fled abroad to the United Kingdom. During the Second World War, Halpern worked in British service as an MI6 agent in the United States, as part of British Security Co-ordination.

== Biography ==
=== Background ===
Halpern was born into a family of Russian Jews in St. Petersburg. His father, Yakov Markovich Halpern (1840–1914) was a prominent official of the Ministry of Justice of the Russian Empire and a lawyer. Halpern graduated from the Faculty of Law of St. Petersburg University and became an attorney at St. Petersburg. Politically, Halpern was aligned with the Menshevik-wing of the Russian Social Democratic Labour Party. He worked as a legal adviser to the British Embassy in St. Petersburg, working with a number of British and American firms.

=== Menshevism and Masonry ===
He joined an irregular freemasonic lodge; the Grand Orient of the Russian Peoples; upon the recommendation of Alexander Kerensky and Bruno Germanovič Lopatin-Bart. He sat as a member of the Supreme Council of the Grand Orient from 1912 to 1917 and was the Secretary General of the Supreme Council of the Grand Orient from 1916 to 1917. In February 1917 he replaced Vladimir Dmitrievich Nabokov as manager of the affairs of the Russian Provisional Government and held this post until the overthrow of the Provisional Government in October 1917 during the October Revolution. He was associated with the failed Committee for Salvation of Motherland and Revolution. Until the end of 1918, he lived covertly in Moscow and Petrograd, before fleeing first to Paris and then to London.

=== Exile and in British intelligence service ===
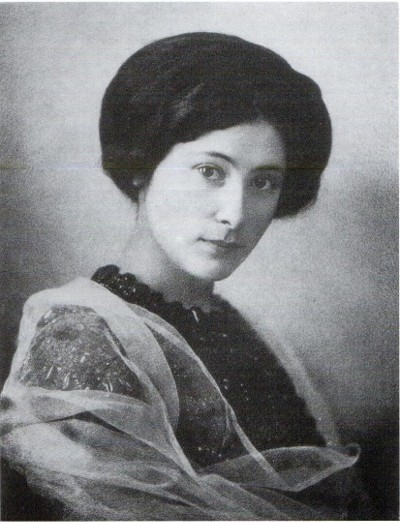
Salomea Andronikova married Alexander Halpern in 1925.

In 1928 he gave an interview about Freemasonry to Boris Nikolayevsky, later published in the book "Russian Masons and Revolution." He married Salomea Andronikova; for a long time the couple lived separately, Halpern in London, and his wife in Paris. The two reunited in the United Kingdom only in the 1940s.

During the Second World War, Halpern lived in New York City in the United States, working for British Intelligence (British Security Co-ordination). The project was set up in 1940 by the Secret Intelligence Service (MI6) under the approval of Winston Churchill. The primary objective of the operation was to change the American public mood from one of isolationism to intervention in the war. While there he maintained contact with old Mensheviks such as Boris Nicolaevsky, Irakli Tsereteli, Raphael Abramovitch and others, who collaborated in The Socialist Herald.

After the war he returned to England, where he lived with his wife in a house at 39 Chelsea Park Gardens in the affluent area of Chelsea, London. One of the rooms in the Halpern house was handed over to Anna Kallin (1896–1984), a mistress of Oskar Kokoschka who worked for the British Broadcasting Corporation as a producer. While in London, Halpern was well acquainted with personalities such as Isaiah Berlin, Moura Budberg, Anthony Blunt and Zinovy Peshkov. Halpern was for a long time the chairman of the ORT UK. He died in 1956.

== See also ==
- Special Operations Executive
- List of SOE agents

== Bibliography ==
- Berlin, Isaiah (2012). Flourishing: Letters 1928 - 1946. Random House. ISBN 978-1448104789.
- Mahl, Thomas E (1997). Desperate Deception: British Covert Operations in the United States, 1939-44. Brassey's Inc. ISBN 1574880802.
- Parkhomovsky, Mikhail (1993). Jews in the Culture of Russia Abroad: Collected Articles, Publications, Memoirs and Essays, vol. 1, 1919–1939. Jerusalem.
