= Nikolai Vissarionovich Nekrasov =

Russian politician (1879–1940)

Nikolai Nekrasov
- Николай Некрасов
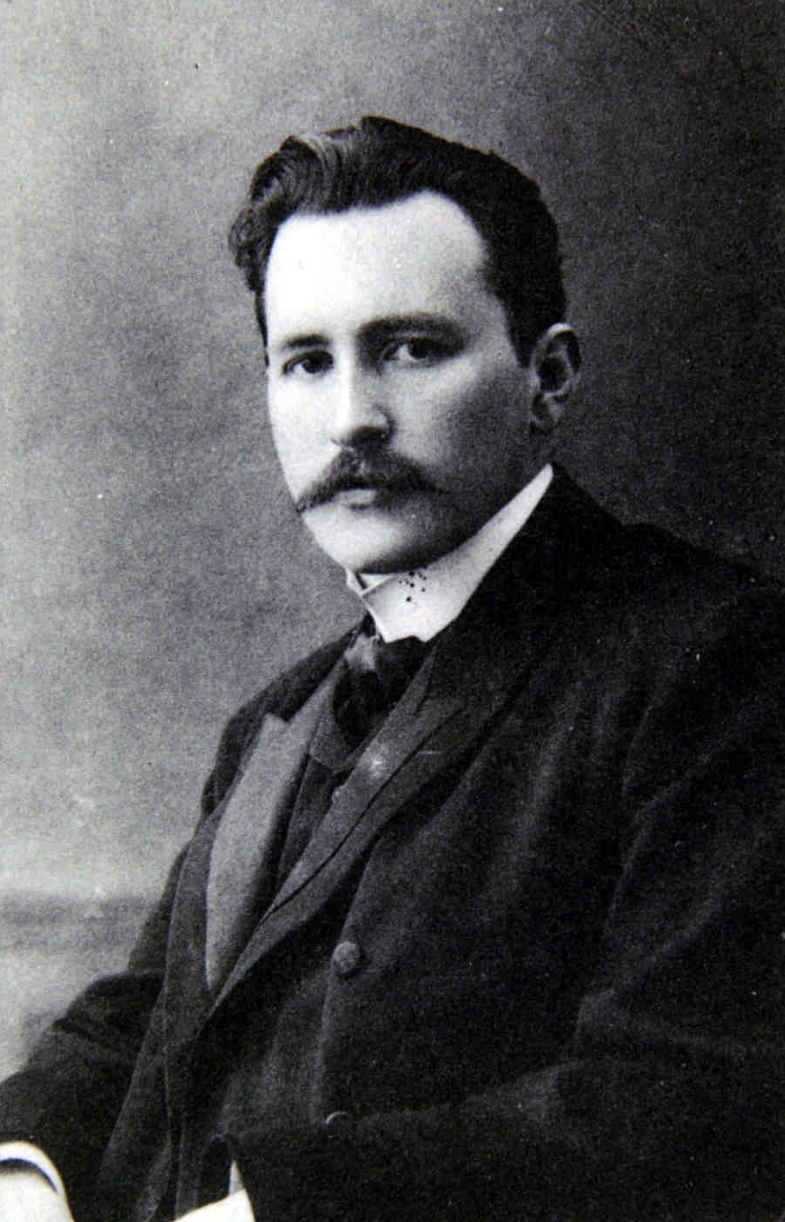
- Nekrasov in 1910

Governor-General of Finland
- In office 17 September – 7 November 1917
- Minister-Chairman: Alexander Kerensky
- Preceded by: Mikhail Stakhovich
- Succeeded by: Position abolished

Vice President of Russia
- In office 20 July – 14 September 1917
- Chairman of the Provisional Government: Alexander Kerensky
- Preceded by: Position created
- Succeeded by: Alexander Konovalov

Minister of Transport of Russia
- In office 15 March – 20 July 1917
- Chairman of the Provisional Government: Georgy Lvov
- Preceded by: Eduard Krieger-Voinovsky (as Minister of Railways of the Russian Empire)
- Succeeded by: Piotr Yurenev

Minister of Finance of Russia
- In office 20 July – 14 September 1917
- Chairman of the Provisional Government: Alexander Kerensky
- Preceded by: Andrei Shingarev
- Succeeded by: Mikhail Bernatsky

Personal details
- Born: 1 November [O.S. 20 October] 1879 Saint Petersburg, Russian Empire
- Died: 7 May 1940 (aged 60) Moscow, Russian SFSR, Soviet Union
- Cause of death: Gunshot

Nikolai Vissarionovich Nekrasov (Russian: Никола́й Виссарио́нович Некра́сов) (1 November [O.S. 20 October] 1879 – 7 May 1940) was a Russian liberal politician and the last governor-general of Finland.

== Biography ==
=== Parliamentary career ===
Born in the family of a priest, Nekrasov graduated with a degree in transportation engineering in 1902 and went abroad for graduate studies. After returning to Russia in 1904, he became a professor at the Tomsk Engineering Institute. In late 1905, at the height of the Russian Revolution of 1905, he helped found the Constitutional Democratic Party (aka the Kadet party) and headed its regional office in Yalta, Crimea. He was elected to the 3rd (1907) and 4th (1912) State Dumas. Nekrasov was an active member of the irregular freemasonic lodge, the Grand Orient of Russia's Peoples. He was the Secretary General from 1912 to 1913 and again from 1914 to 1916.

Between 1909 and 1915, Nekrasov was a member of the Kadets' Central Committee, where he was consistently Left of center. He delivered the Kadets' parliamentary interpellation on 9 April 1912, after the Lena massacre, denouncing what he described as the government's illegal interference in an economic dispute between labor and capital on the side of the latter. Later in 1912 Nekrasov argued that "constructive work" within the Duma had been made impossible by the Tsarist government and that the party should be more confrontational and use the Duma for anti-government propaganda instead of lawmaking. On 11 June 1915 he resigned from the Central Committee over what he saw as the majority's willingness to give the government a blank check during World War I.

On 6 November 1916 Nekrasov was elected deputy Chairman of the Duma. At the same time, convinced that Emperor Nicholas II and his court were leading the country down the road to a military defeat and revolution, Nekrasov began plotting with former Duma Chairman Octobrist Alexander Guchkov, Kerensky, Aleksandr Konovalov and industrialist Mikhail Tereshchenko to force Nicholas to abdicate. Nicholas’ 13-year-old son, Alexei, would then assume the throne and Nicholas' more liberal brother, Grand Duke Michael, would become Regent. Their plans were still in progress when the February Revolution of 1917 made them moot.

=== Government Minister (March–August 1917) ===
Nekrasov became a member of the Provisional Committee of the State Duma on 27 February 1917. On 2 March he was appointed transportation minister in the Russian Provisional Government formed by the Duma. He argued for the inclusion of moderate socialists (Mensheviks and Socialist Revolutionaries) in the government and kept his post in the liberal-socialist coalition government formed on 5 May. In late June Nekrasov was one of the Provisional Government's representatives at the negotiations with the Ukrainian Rada, which granted Ukraine a measure of autonomy within Russia. The agreement was adamantly opposed by the Kadet leadership, which wanted to postpone any decisions regarding ethnic minorities until the convocation of the Russian Constituent Assembly. When other Kadet ministers left the government in protest on 2 July, Nekrasov resigned from the party and became deputy prime minister on 8 July after Alexander Kerensky replaced Georgy Lvov as head of government. When the coalition was re-formed under Kerensky on 24 July, Nekrasov remained deputy prime minister and also became finance minister, representing the Radical Democratic Party. During the Kornilov Affair in late August, Nekrasov first supported Kerensky, but at one point suggested that Kerensky's resignation may present a way out of the crisis, which resulted in his exclusion from the next coalition government in September.

=== Last Governor-General of Finland (September–November 1917) ===
On 17 September (New Style from this point on) Nekrasov was appointed Governor-General of Finland after Mikhail Aleksandrovich Stakhovich quit the post. Nekrasov's job was to negotiate between the Finnish Senate and the Russian Provisional Government. The Senate wanted to secure the Finnish autonomy with a treaty. This was approved by Kerensky in September, but in October the Senate came up with a new proposal which would further increase Finnish independence.

On the morning of 7 November, Nekrasov, on his way to Saint Petersburg to hand over the proposal to Kerensky, found out that the Provisional Government had been overthrown by the Bolsheviks during the October Revolution. He informed the Senate that he would not return to Finland.

=== After the 1917 Revolution ===
Nekrasov kept a low profile during the Russian Civil War and did not resist the Bolsheviks, moving to Kazan in 1919. After the war ended, he was arrested in March 1921 and kept in prison for 2 months. He was released in May and made a member of the governing board of the Union of Consumer Cooperatives, where he remained until his next arrest on 3 November 1930. He was accused of having been involved in the Menshevik Center conspiracy and sentenced to 10 years in prison. After an early release in March 1933, he was arrested again on 13 June 1939, sentenced to death and shot on 7 May 1940.

== Awards ==
- Order of the Red Banner of Labour (1938)

== Works ==
- Perspektivy razvitiia potrebitel'skoi kooperatsii na piat' let (with M. L. Maksimov), [?], 1927, 207p.
- General'nye dogovory vo vzaimootnosheniiah gosudarstvennoi promyshlennosti i poterbitel'skoi kooperatsii (with Abram Anan'evich Kissin), Moscow, 1928, xi, 174p.

== Notes ==
Political offices
Preceded by Mihail Aleksandrovich Stahovich	Governor-General of Finland; 1917	Finland gained independence Succeeded by Kaarlo Juho Ståhlberg as President of Finland
