= Alastaneli =

Alastaneli (Georgian: ალასტანელი, "of/from Alastani") was a title of the Georgian dynastic princes ruling over the province of Javakheti from their castle at Alastani in the 13th and 14th centuries. According to traditional Georgian genealogy, this dynasty was a branch of the royal house of Bagrationi, stemming from King David VIII of Georgia (died 1311). Their status of "provincial kings" was rooted in the political fragmentation of the centralized Georgian monarchy under the Mongol hegemony. This line became extinct in the early 15th century.

== History ==
Alastani, north of modern-day town of Akhalkalaki, became a centre of the domain of crown princes of Georgia early in the 13th century. Lasha-George, son of Queen Tamar the Great and the future king George IV of Georgia, is thought to have been the first in possession of this principality. The line of Alastani was founded by David VIII, who withdrew in Javakheti in 1302 after losing struggle for the Georgian throne to his younger brother, Vakhtang III. His descendants flourished as "provincial kings", i.e., provincial rulers with a royal title, but more or less dependent on the kings of Georgia. These were David's purported sons of his first marriage to Oljath, daughter of Abaqa Khan: Melchizedek (died 1320) and Andronicus (d. 1354); and Andronicus's sons: David (d. 1382) and George the Great (d. 1373). The line of "kings" of Alastani terminated with the death of the latter in the battle with the Turks in 1373.

Family of Alastaneli

David VIII of Georgia (died 1311)
Melchizedek (died 1320)	Andronicus (d. 1354)	George VI of Georgia (d. 1313)
George	David (died 1382)	George "the Great" (d. 1373)
George (died 1431)	Alexander

== Andronikashvili? ==
Professor Cyril Toumanoff of Georgetown University advanced a hypothesis not accepted by the mainstream Georgian scholarship, identifying the dynasty of Alastani (c. 1230–1348) with the Georgian noble family Andronikashvili, who claimed descent from Alexios Komnenos (c. 1170–1199), the illegitimate son of the Byzantine Emperor Andronikos I Komnenos (ruled 1183-1185) by his mistress and relative Theodora Komnene, Queen Dowager of Jerusalem. Toumanoff attempted to reconstruct the early pedigree of these Alastaneli-Andronikashvili:

Family tree of the Alastaneli per C. Toumanoff

Alexios Komnenos (c. 1170—1199)
George "the Great", "King" of Alastani (fl. 1230)
David, "King" of Alastani (fl. 1270)
Melchizedek, "King" of Alastani (fl. 1300)
Andronikos, "King" of Alastani (c. 1339—1348)
George, Prince Andronikashvili-Alastaneli (d. 1431)
Princes Andronikashvili
