= Salomea Andronikova =

Georgian socialite (1888–1982)

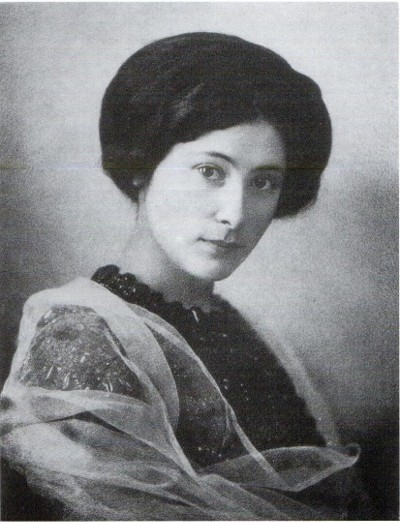
Salomea Andronikashvili in 1910

Salomea Nikolayevna Andronikova (Russian: Саломея Николаевна Андроникова), born Salome Andronikashvili (Georgian: სალომე ანდრონიკაშვილი; October 1888 – May 8, 1982), was a Georgian socialite of the literary and artistic world of pre-revolutionary Saint Petersburg. A friend of the poets Anna Akhmatova and Osip Mandelstam, her physical and intellectual charms were celebrated in their poetry and inspired other writers such as Grigol Robakidze and Ilia Zdanevich, as well as the artists Boris Grigoriev, Alexandre Jacovleff and Zinaida Serebriakova. In exile she lived in Georgia (1917–1919), France (1919–1940), the United States (1940–1947) and Britain (1947–1982).

== Family ==
Salome Ivanovna Andronikashvili was born in Tiflis (now Tbilisi, Georgia) in October 1888 into the family of the Georgian prince Ivane Andronikashvili (1863–1944) and his Russian wife Lidiya Pleshcheyeva-Muratova (1861–1953), a relative of the poet Aleksey Pleshcheyev. Salomea's real patronymic was "Ivanovna", but she thought that somewhat vulgar and adopted "Nikolayevna" instead. The Andronikashvili family claimed descent from a natural son of the Eastern Roman Emperor Andronikos I Komnenos. Salomea also had a sister, Maria (1891–1976), and a brother, Jesse (1893–1937), who became a White Russian officer and was killed in 1937 during Joseph Stalin's rule.

== St. Petersburg and emigration ==
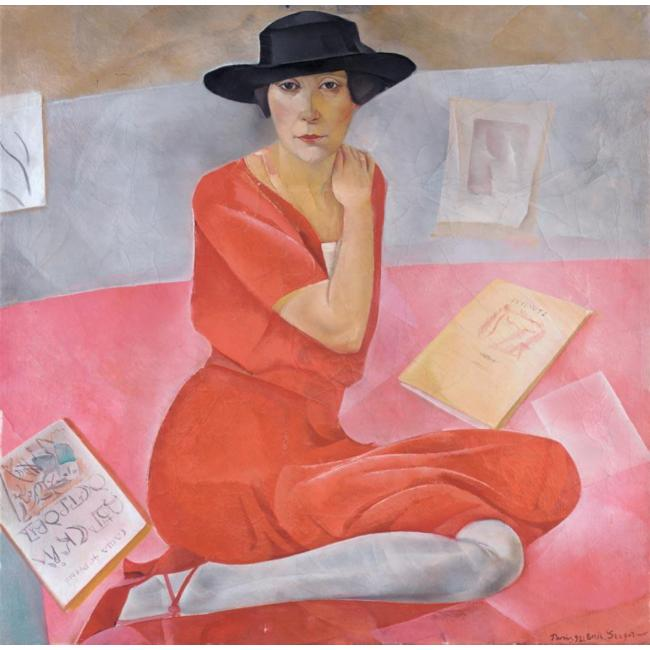
Princess Salomea Andronikova, by Boris Grigoriev

In 1906, at the age of 18, Salomea moved from Tiflis to St. Petersburg. There she married the tea businessman Pavel Andreyev, and gave birth to a daughter Irina. Her salon hosted, among others, the poets Anna Akhmatova and Osip Mandelstam. After divorcing Andreyev, Salomea had a 7-year affair with the Russian poet Sergey Rafalovich.

After the revolutionary turmoil in Petrograd in 1917 Salomea and Rafalovich fled to her native Georgia. She settled in Tiflis, and co-edited the Russian-language literary monthly Orion. Here she began a love affair with Zinovy Peshkov, a French diplomat of Russian background.

In 1919 she fled with Peshkov to Paris. She helped the Russian artist Zinaida Serebriakova escape from Soviet Russia, and supported the poet Marina Tsvetaeva during her forced exile in Europe. But when her brother's wife and their son Constantin fled to France in 1920, her brother was imprisoned in Russia by the Bolsheviks, and he later died in captivity.

In 1925 Salomea married the Menshevik lawyer Alexander Galpern, a Russian émigré to London and a close friend of Alexander Kerensky; but the couple lived separately. She worked for the fashion magazines of Lucien Vogel.

During World War II she remained in Paris until 1940, when she moved to the United States, where Galpern served at the British embassy. She took her grandson with her, but her daughter Irina, baroness Nolde, a member of the French Resistance, remained in Nazi German captivity.

After the War, Salomea moved back to Europe, and in 1947 settled in London. There she remained until her death on 8 May 1982, at the age of 94—in a house which had been purchased for her by the philosopher Sir Isaiah Berlin. In accordance with her will her ashes were scattered in Trafalgar Square.
