= Alexey Nikitin (politician) =

Russian politician (1876–1939)

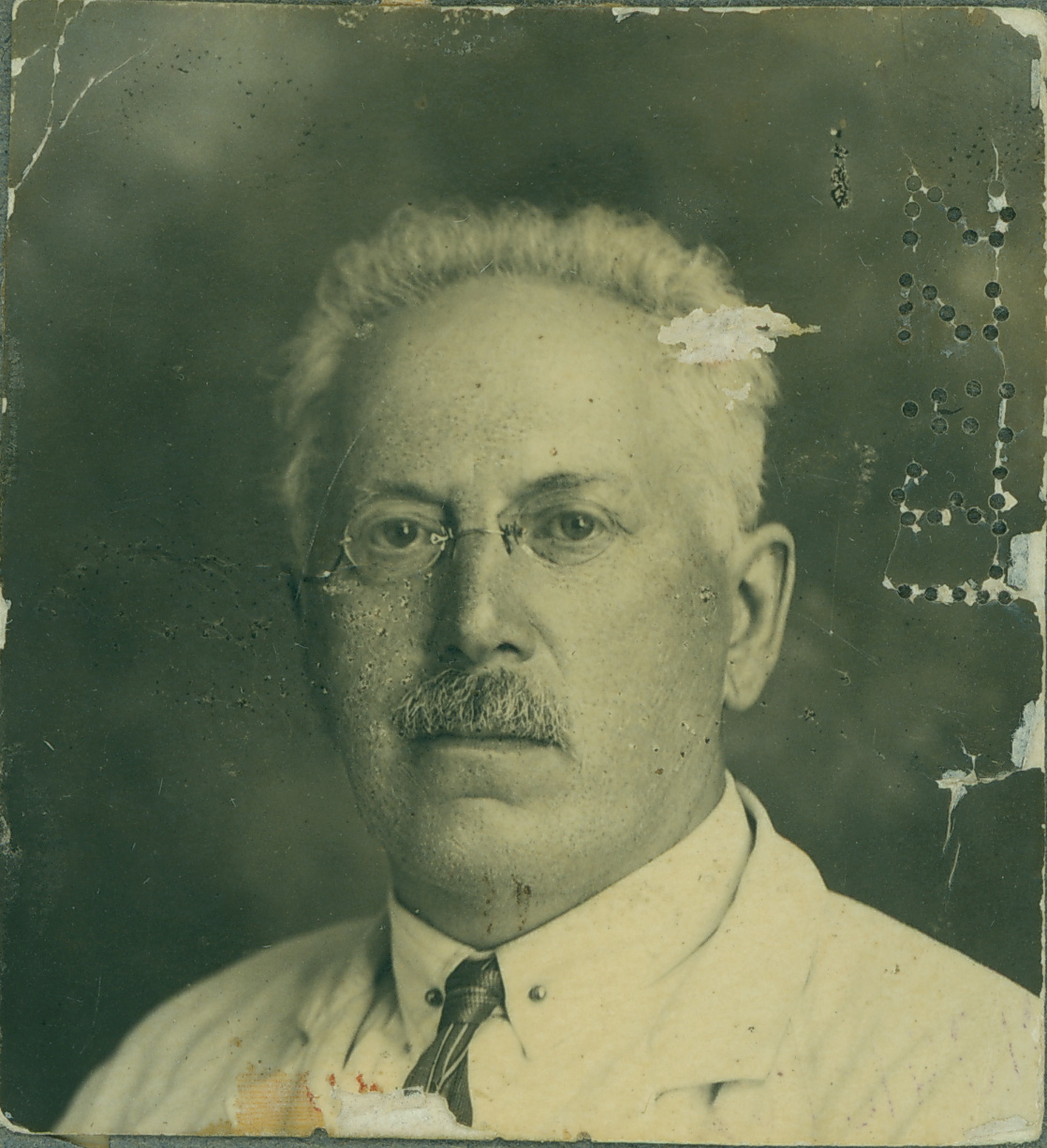
Image of Nikitin, Alexey

Alexey Maksimovich Nikitin (Russian: Алексе́й Макси́мович Ники́тин; 1876–1939) was a Russian politician who was the last Ministers of Internal Affairs of the Russian Provisional Government from 15 September to 7 November 1917.
