= Andrei Shingarev =

Russian politician (1869–1918)

- Андрей Шингарёв
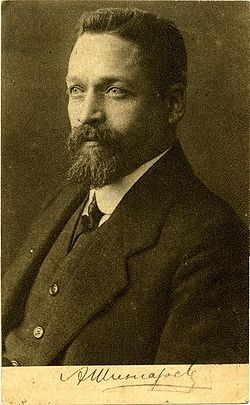
- Born: Андрей Иванович Шингарёв; August 30, 1869; Borovoye, Voronezh Governorate, Russian Empire
- Died: January 20, 1918 (aged 48); Petrograd, Soviet Russia
- Occupations: politician, state official

Andrei Ivanovich Shingarev or Shingaryov (Russian: Андре́й Ива́нович Шингарёв) (August 18, 1869 – January 20, 1918) was a Russian medical doctor, publicist and politician. He was a Duma deputy and one of the leaders of the Constitutional Democratic party (known as the Kadets).

== Biography ==
Shingarev's mother, Zinaida Nikanorovna was born into an aristocratic family. His father, Ivan Andreevich Shingarev, was a prosperous merchant, first in the Tambov Governorate and then in Voronezh. When Andrei Shingarev was ten years old, he entered a secondary school in Voronezh, graduating in 1887. Then he continued his studies at Imperial Moscow University in the faculty of physics and mathematics and graduated in 1891, in 1894 getting a further degree in medicine.

In 1895–1897, Shingarev was a practicing doctor. In 1898 he became a country doctor and started managing the Voronezh medical district. Shingarev published in many newspapers and magazines, for example in the newspaper The Russian Idea. He participated in the 1905 Russian Revolution while he was in Voronezh.

Shingarev was several times elected to the State Duma. After the February Revolution, he led the food committee; in the first cabinet of the Provisional Government he was the Minister of Agriculture, and later he held the post of Minister of Finance. In July 1917 Shingarev resigned from the Provisional Government, as he was against the agreement with the Central Rada of Ukraine. He was an active member of the irregular freemasonic lodge called Grand Orient of Russia's Peoples.

On November 28, 1917, Shingarev was arrested at the home of Sofia Panina by the Bolsheviks. As a leader of the opposition, he was imprisoned in the Peter and Paul Fortress. On January 19, 1918, he was transferred, along with his fellow Kadet Fyodor Kokoshkin, to the Mariinskaya Hospital after becoming seriously ill. Both "were brutally murdered there on the following night by a group of Baltic sailors, who broke into the hospital. The Ministry of Justice later revealed that the murders had taken place with the connivance of the Bolshevik Red Guard and the Commandant of the Hospital, Stefan Basov, who justified the murder on the grounds that there would be 'two less bourgeois mouths to feed'. Basov was brought to trial and convicted, but none of the murderers was ever caught and the Bolshevik leaders, who at first condemned the murders, later sought to justify them as an act of political terror."

== Sources ==
- SHINGAREV, Andrei Ivanovich
- Izvestia Article & Notes
- Photograph & Notes (in Russian)
