= Constantin Andronikof =

French diplomat, Christian writer and translator

Prince Constantin Eseevich Andronikof (Russian: Константин Ясеевич Андроников, Konstantin Eseevich Andronikov; Georgian: კონსტანტინე ანდრონიკაშვილი, Konstantine Andronikashvili) (16 July 1916 – 12 September 1997) was a French diplomat, Christian writer and translator.

== Biography ==
Constantin Eseevich Andronikof was born in Russia on 16 July 1916, in St. Petersburg, into an established Georgian family, the Andronikashvili. His father, Iesse Ivanovich Andronicov, was an officer in the Imperial Russian army; and his father's sister, Salomea Andronikova (1888-1982), was a prominent socialite in the Silver Age of Russian culture and an inspiration for many Russian modernist poets and artists. During the Russian Civil War his aunt Salomea fled to Paris, and in 1920 the boy Constantin, in the arms of his mother, also fled to France; but his father, Jesse, was arrested and imprisoned by the Bolsheviks, and was later shot during the Great Purge of 1937.

Constantin Andronikof was educated in France. He graduated in philosophy and literature from the University of Paris in 1940, and from the St. Sergius Orthodox Theological Institute in 1944.

He later worked for the French Ministry of Foreign Affairs, and served as an English and Russian interpreter to a number of French Presidents including President de Gaulle. In 1953, together with Hans Jacob and Andre Kaminker, he founded AIIC, The International Association of Conference Interpreters.

Andronikof became best known as a prolific French translator of Russian Christian thinkers, especially of the theological works of Fr. Sergei Bulgakov. He published several works on Christian festivals. From 1991 to 1993 Andronikof served as dean of St. Sergius Orthodox Theological Institute in Paris.

He died on 12 September 1997, in Paris.

== Works ==
- Le sens des fetes: T. 1. Le cycle fixe (1970. Cerf, Paris), 309 p.
- Les Notes apologetiques
- Le sens des fetes: T. 2. Le cycle pascal (1985. L'age d'homme, Lausanne)
- Le sens de la Liturgie: La relation entre Dieu et l'homme (1988. Cerf, Paris), 322 p.
