= Alexios Komnenos (son of Andronikos I) =

Byzantine illegitemate son (c. 1170–1199)

Alexios Komnenos (c. 1170 – 1199) was a natural son of Andronikos I Komnenos, the Byzantine Emperor (r. 1183 – 1185) by his relative and mistress Theodora Komnene, Queen Dowager of Jerusalem.

During the reign of Emperor Manuel I Komnenos (r. 1143–1180), Alexios accompanied his father Andronikos in exile, visiting, inter alia, the Kingdom of Georgia. The Georgian king George III, their relative, granted to Andronikos several castles in Kakhetia in the east of Georgia. Andronikos returned to Constantinople and usurped the Byzantine crown in 1183, only to be overthrown and killed in 1185. Alexios then fled to Georgia, where he was restored to his father's Georgian estates. At one point, he was even considered by some Georgian nobles as a candidate to become a consort of Queen Tamar of Georgia.

According to the Georgian historical tradition, during Andronikos I's sojourn in Georgia, he left progeny in the country, which flourished and produced the noble family of Andronikashvili, i.e., "scions of Andronikos". Since Andronikos I had no sons by a Georgian mistress at this time, modern scholars trace the origin of this family to Alexios, but the exact origin of the family name is disputed, not least because the attested genealogy of the Andronikashvili does not commence until the 16th century. Michel Kuršanskis suggests that the family was possibly named after a son of Alexios. On the other hand, Cyril Toumanoff assumed that the line of the "provincial kings" of Alastani (c. 1230–1348), known from the medieval Georgian sources and including one named Andronikos (r. 1339–1348), might have belonged to the Georgian Komnenoi/Andronikashvili. According to his view, followed by Konstantinos Varzos, Alexios had a son, George "the Great", who received the domain of Alastani to rule as his sub-kingdom, and that the name "Andronikashvili" only came about after Andronikos of Alastani, Alexios's great-great-grandson.

== Sources ==
- Kazhdan, Alexander, ed. (1991). The Oxford Dictionary of Byzantium. Oxford and New York: Oxford University Press. ISBN 0-19-504652-8.
- Kuršankis, Michel (1977). "L'Empire de Trébizonde et la Géorgie". Revue des Études Byzantines (in French). 35: 237–256. doi:10.3406/rebyz.1977.2073.
- Toumanoff, Cyril (1976). Manuel de généalogie et de chronologie pour l'histoire de la Caucasie chrétienne (Arménie -Géorgie - Albanie) (in French). Rome: Edizioni Aquila.
- Varzos, Konstantinos (1984). Η Γενεαλογία των Κομνηνών [The Genealogy of the Komnenoi] (PDF) (in Greek). Vol. A2. Thessaloniki: Centre for Byzantine Studies, University of Thessaloniki.
- Varzos, Konstantinos (1984). Η Γενεαλογία των Κομνηνών [The Genealogy of the Komnenoi] (PDF) (in Greek). Vol. B. Thessaloniki: Centre for Byzantine Studies, University of Thessaloniki.
