= Golos Pravdy =

Russian Bolshevik newspaper of 1917

Golos Pravdy (Russian: Голос правды; lit. 'Voice of Truth') was a daily newspaper published from Kronstadt, Russia between 28 March [O.S. 15 March] 1917 and 26 July [O.S. 13 July] 1917. It was the organ of the Kronstadt Committee of the Russian Social Democratic Labour Party (Bolsheviks). The newspaper was printed daily in 5,000-10,000 copies.

Golos Pravdy was one of the first legal Bolshevik newspapers to appear outside of Petrograd after the February Revolution. The local groups of the Bolshevik Party had raised funds (up to 4,000 Russian Rubles by 2 April [O.S. 20 March] 1917) and they hired a private printing press. On 30 March [O.S. 17 March] 1917 Fyodor Raskolnikov (a student at the Marine Academy and veteran Bolshevik journalist) arrived in Kronstadt to become the editor-in-chief of Golos Pravdy and was put in command of the local party committee. Other editors of Golos Pravdy included Boris Zhemchuzhin, Pyotr Smirnov and Sernion Roshal. The Bolshevik activists of Kronstadt distributed Golos Pravdy among sailors of the Baltic Fleet, soldiers at the military garrison and workers at the gun powder factory on the island.

Golos Pravdy routinely reprinted materials from the main Bolshevik newspaper Pravda, including speeches and articles by Lenin, Kalinin and Stalin and materials from the 7th All Russian Party Conference (April Theses). The newspaper also frequently carried letter written by local residents and resolutions from meetings of sailors, soldiers and workers. Within the party, the editorial line of Golos Pravdy belonged to the moderate camp which opposed the call for an immediate overthrow of the Provisional Government. Whilst Golos Pravdy and the Bolshevik representatives in the Kronstadt Soviet were part of the moderate Bolshevik camp, the Kronstadt Bolshevik Party Committee was aligned with the radicals in the Petrograd Military Revolutionary Committee and the Vyborg Bolshevik Party District.

On 23 June [O.S. 10 June] 1917 Golos Pravdy included three sharply worded articles, denouncing the socialist ministers in the Provisional Government Irakli Tsereteli and Matvey Skobelev (notably Tsereteli as Minister for Post and Telecommunications was responsible for military censorship of publications such as Pravda). The articles coincided with a militant protest in Kronstadt against the reformist left.

In the immediate aftermath of the July Days, the new Minister-President and Minister of War and Navy Alexander Kerensky publicly accused the Kronstadt Soviet of treason on 20 July [O.S. 7 July] 1917, 1917. His Deputy Minister for Navy, Dudorov, ordered the arrest of Kronstadt Bolshevik leaders and the closure of Golos Pravdy on 24 July [O.S. 11 July] 1917. Although the Kronstadt Soviet denounced the closure of Golos Pravdy as 'an act unworthy of the Russian Revolution', the newspaper closed down on 26 July [O.S. 13 July] 1917. On 27 July [O.S. 14 July] 1917, 1917 a new publication appeared in its stead, Proletarskoe Delo (printed in 12,000 copies).
