= Grand Orient of Russia's Peoples =

Russian political organisation (1912–1917)

- Formation: 1912
- Dissolved: 1917
- Type: Co-Freemasonry
- Headquarters: St. Petersburg, Russia
- Location: Russian Empire
- Secretary General: Nikolai Nekrasov (1913–1916); Alexander Kerensky (1916–1917); Alexander Halpern (1917)

The Grand Orient of Russia's Peoples (Russian: Великий восток народов России) (GOoRP) was an illegal Co-Freemasonry political organisation which existed in Russia from 1912 until 1917. The organisation was highly political in nature and though it included people from several different parties, the most prominent belonged to the Constitutional Democratic Party. Although it originated out of Russian members of the Grand Orient of France, by the time the GOоRP emerged in 1912 it had ripped ties to all foreign masonic organisations. GOoRP had around 400 members.

== Background ==
Freemasonry in Russia was outlawed in 1822 during the reign of Alexander I of Russia and a further crackdown was initiated during the reign of Nicholas I of Russia, as the creators of the Decembrist Revolt, the Union of Salvation, were accused of being connected to Freemasonry. By the end of the 19th century, Russian political and intellectual emigres living in Paris had started to enter Masonic lodges working the Scottish Rite. This included Maksim Kovalevsky, Grigorii Nikolayevich Vyrubov and Pavel Yablochkov.

Following the 1905 Russian Revolution, the right to form unions and private meetings was established under Nicholas II of Russia and thus the limitations on Freemasonry were lifted. Former Russian exiles active in Grand Orient of France and the Grand Lodge of France both set up a number of Lodges in Russia. Prominent figures in this drive were the aforementioned Kovalevsky and also Evgenii Valentinovich de Roberti. These few lodges were typically opened in St. Petersburg and Moscow. The three lodges of the Grand Orient had about 94 members in total.

== Political aspects ==
In 1910, the Masonic Association of the Grand Orient of the Russian People's began to emerge among these Lodges. It was marked by a move away from the esotericism inherent in the basic Three Degrees in Freemasonry and an embrace of political activism. The Grand Orient of France in Russia stopped operations at this time because 37 of its 94 members had joined the new Russian Grand Orient as it became openly a separate organisation in 1912. The organisation severed relations with foreign masonic organisations.

The group was not limited to just men and included the participation of women such as Yekaterina Kuskova.

Most of the members of the Grand Orient were associated with the Russian Provisional Government which came into being following the February Revolution. Indeed, Alexander Kerensky had been the Secretary General of the Grand Orient from 1916 until July 1917, while the Vice-President Nikolai Vissarionovich Nekrasov was the original Secretary General of the Grand Orient. Following the October Revolution and the ascent to power of Vladimir Lenin and the Bolsheviks Freemasonry was banned and freemasons fled abroad to Berlin and France, where they formed lodges in exile (some simply fell away from masonry altogether).

During the Russian Civil War, Masonry was perceived to be allied with the White movement and Kerensky as a figure, thus Bolshevism was hostile to it. At the 4th World Congress of the Communist International held at Moscow in 1922, all Communist Party members were officially ordered to sever any connection to Freemasonry in general, with it being resolved that the two were not compatible.

== Secretary General ==
- Nikolai Vissarionovich Nekrasov, 1912–1913, 1914–1916 (Kadets)
- Alexandеr Kolyubakin, 1913–1914 (Kadets)
- Alexander Kerensky, 1916–1917 (Right SR)
- Alexander Halpern, 1917 (Menshevik)
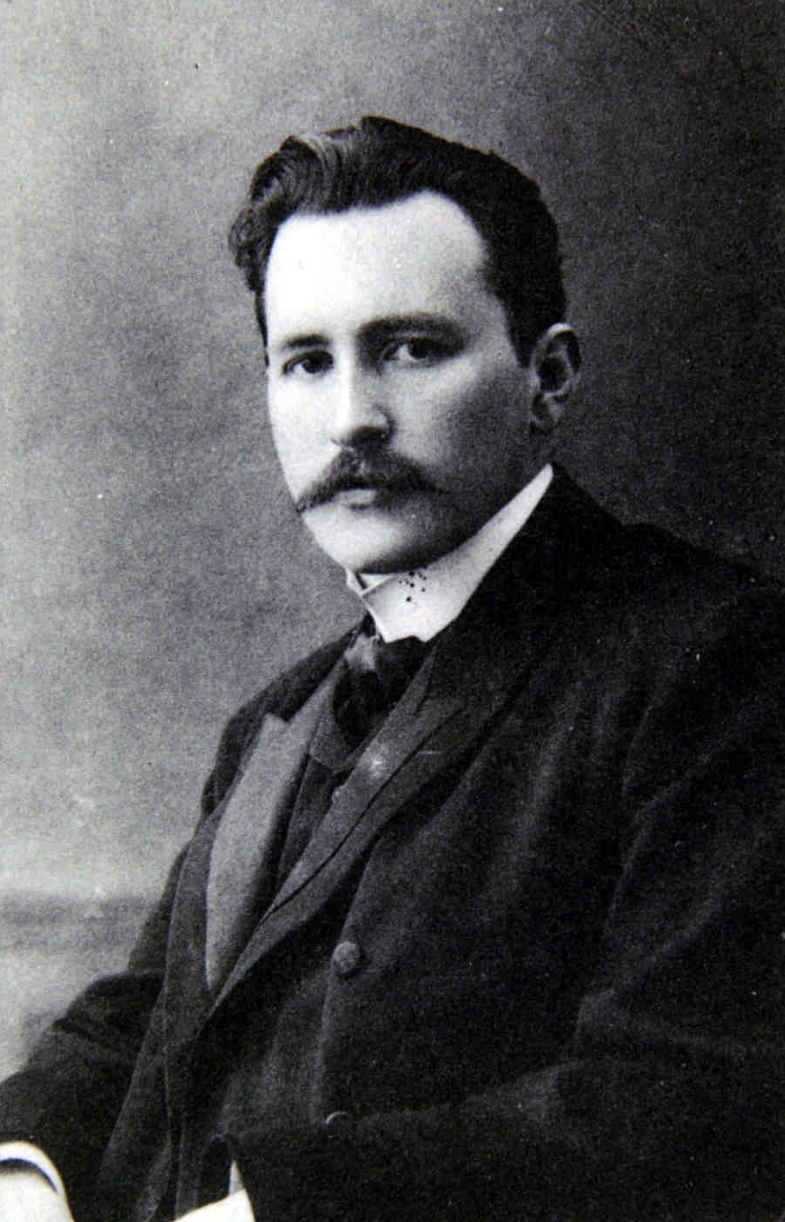
Nikolai Nekrasov

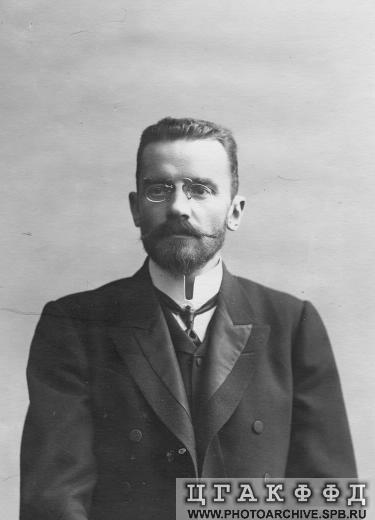
Alexandеr Kolyubakin

Alexander Kerensky
