= Ivane Andronikashvili (agronomist) =

Georgian agronomist and public activist (1862–1947)

Ivane Andronikashvili (Georgian: ივანე ანდრონიკაშვილი) (September 10, 1862 in Melaani, Kakheti – July 11, 1947 in Tbilisi) was a Georgian agronomist and public activist. Born into a noble family, he studied agriculture and forestry in Moscow, and from 1889 to 1902 he worked in the Caucasus Main Expert Committee and led expeditions throughout Georgia and the North Caucasus. He edited the popular magazine "Vine and Wine" (ვაზი და ღვინო), founded in 1921 on the initiative of Andronikashvili. He was also Mayor of Batumi.
