= Matvey Skobelev =

Russian Marxist revolutionary and politician (1885–1938)

- Матвей Скобелев
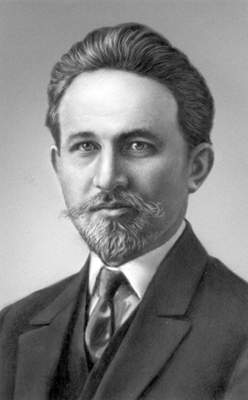
- Skobelev in 1925

Comrade of the Chairman of the Petrograd Soviet
- Preceded by: Position established
- Succeeded by: Lev Kamenev

Vice Chairman of the Petrograd Soviet
- Preceded by: Alexander Kerensky
- Succeeded by: Grigory Zinoviev

Personal details
- Born: 9 November 1885
- Died: July 29, 1938
- Citizenship: Russian Empire, Russian Republic, Russian Soviet Federative Socialist Republic, Union of Soviet Socialist Republics, France, Austria
- Party: RSDRP(M)

Matvey Ivanovich Skobelev (Russian: Матве́й Ива́нович Ско́белев; 9 November 1885 – 29 July 1938) was a Russian Marxist revolutionary and politician.

== Biography ==
=== Trotsky's Disciple in Vienna (1908–1912) ===
Skobelev was born in the family of a wealthy Baku oilman and industrialist of the Molokan faith. He joined the Russian Social Democratic Labor Party in 1903. After the Russian Revolution of 1905 he went abroad to study at a polytechnic in Vienna. While in Vienna, he became a friend and supporter of Leon Trotsky, whose bi-weekly Pravda he helped edit in 1908–1912. Skobelev and another editor, Adolph Joffe, both scions of wealthy families, also helped Trotsky finance the paper.

=== Duma Deputy (1912–1917) ===
In the summer of 1912 Skobelev went back to his native Caucasus and was elected to the 4th Duma (1912–1917) from the Social Democrats. He soon came under the influence of the head of the Menshevik part of the Social Democratic faction in the Duma, Nikolay Chkheidze, and supported him against the Bolshevik emigre leaders (Vladimir Lenin, Grigory Zinoviev and Lev Kamenev) who, in 1912–1913, were trying to get the Bolshevik deputies to break away from the Menshevik majority and form a separate faction in the Duma. After the faction finally split in mid-1913, Skobelev and Chkheidze went to London for the 1 December 1913 meeting of the International Socialist Bureau to apply pressure on the Bolshevik deputies to preserve socialist unity, ultimately unsuccessfully. At the outbreak of World War I in 1914, Skobelev and Chkheidze tentatively supported the war effort while remaining critical of the Russian government's internal policies and prosecution of the war. Skobelev, like Chkheidze, was an active member of the irregular freemasonic lodge, the Grand Orient of Russia’s Peoples.

=== Revolutionary Leader (1917) ===
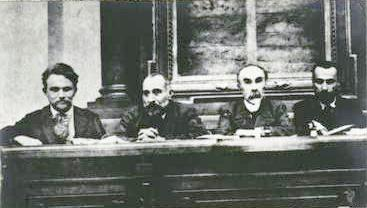
Skobelev (far left) during the First Convention of All-Russia Soviet Workers and Soldier Deputies

During the February Revolution of 1917, Skobelev and other Menshevik Duma deputies became leaders of the Petrograd Soviet when it was formed on 27 February, Skobelev at first serving as chairman. On 7 March Skobelev became one of the 5 original members of the Contact Committee of the Petrograd Soviet which coordinated policy decisions with the newly formed Russian Provisional Government. On 12 March he was elected deputy chairman of the Petrograd Soviet's executive committee with Chkheidze as chairman. When the Mensheviks agreed to join the Provisional Government on 5 May, Skobelev became the new government's Minister of Labor. On 23–24 May Skobelev and Irakli Tsereteli hammered out a compromise with rebellious Kronstadt sailors who, led by Bolsheviks Fedor Raskolnikov and Semion Roshal, had formed a self-styled autonomous Kronstadt Republic. The compromise avoided a showdown with the Provisional Government.

He was also elected deputy chairman of the All Russian Soviet Executive Committee at the first Soviet Congress in June 1917. In August 1917 he published two government "circulars", which attempted to limit factory workers' rights as follows:

- 23 August - restated the prerogative of management to hire and fire, and the illegality of "coercion", which rendered the culprits liable to criminal prosecution
- 28 August - reminded factory inspectors and commissars that factory committees could only meet outside hours, and that workers had a duty to maintain productivity, "in order to satisfy the demands of the country's defense and the urgent needs of the population"

After resigning his post as Minister of Labor in September 1917, on 3–5 October Skobelev was made the All-Russian Soviet Executive Committee's representative ("nakaz") at the upcoming Paris conference of Allied powers, a position made defunct by the Bolshevik seizure of power during the October Revolution of 1917.

=== After the Revolution (1918–1938) ===
Opposed to the Bolshevik regime, Skobelev moved to his home city of Baku in then-independent Azerbaijan ca. 1919. After the Bolshevik victory in the Russian Civil War and re-annexation of Azerbaijan in 1920, he fled to Paris. Once the Bolshevik government instituted the NEP policy of partial liberalization, Skobelev became reconciled with the new regime and eventually joined the Russian Communist Party (b) 1922 (over Trotsky's objections). In late 1922, he worked on facilitating trade relations between France and Russia and then returned to Russia, where he continued working in the Soviet foreign trade system until his arrest and execution in 1938 during the Great Purge.

== Notes ==
- See Part 3, Chapter 6 of Alan Woods' A History of the Bolshevik Party, Wellred Publications, 1999 ISBN 1-900007-05-3 . In his memoirs, Trotsky identifies Skobelev's father as a "mill owner", presumably because the Skobelev brothers built Baku's largest flour mill, Old Mill, in 1903–1909.
- See Part 4 of Alan Woods's Bolshevism: The Road to Revolution
- See Israel Getzler, Kronstadt 1917–1921: The Fate of a Soviet Democracy, Cambridge University Press, 1983, ISBN 0-521-24479-X and ISBN 0-521-89442-5, pages 91–94.
- See The Russian Provisional Government 1917: Documents, edited by Robert P. Browder and Alexander F. Kerensky, Stanford University Press, 1961, ii, 721–22, quoted in
- See Instructions to Skobelev
- See Chapter 9 of Naki Keykurun's memoirs where he describes meeting Skobelev in Baku in 1919
- See Chapter XXIV of Trotsky's autobiography My Life (1930)
- See Michael Jabara Carley, Episodes from the Early Cold War: Franco-Soviet Relations, 1917–1927 in Europe-Asia Studies, ISSN 0966-8136 Nov 2000, Vol. 52 Issue 7, p. 1275. Available online as of November 2005.
