= Zinovy Peshkov =

French general (1884–1966)

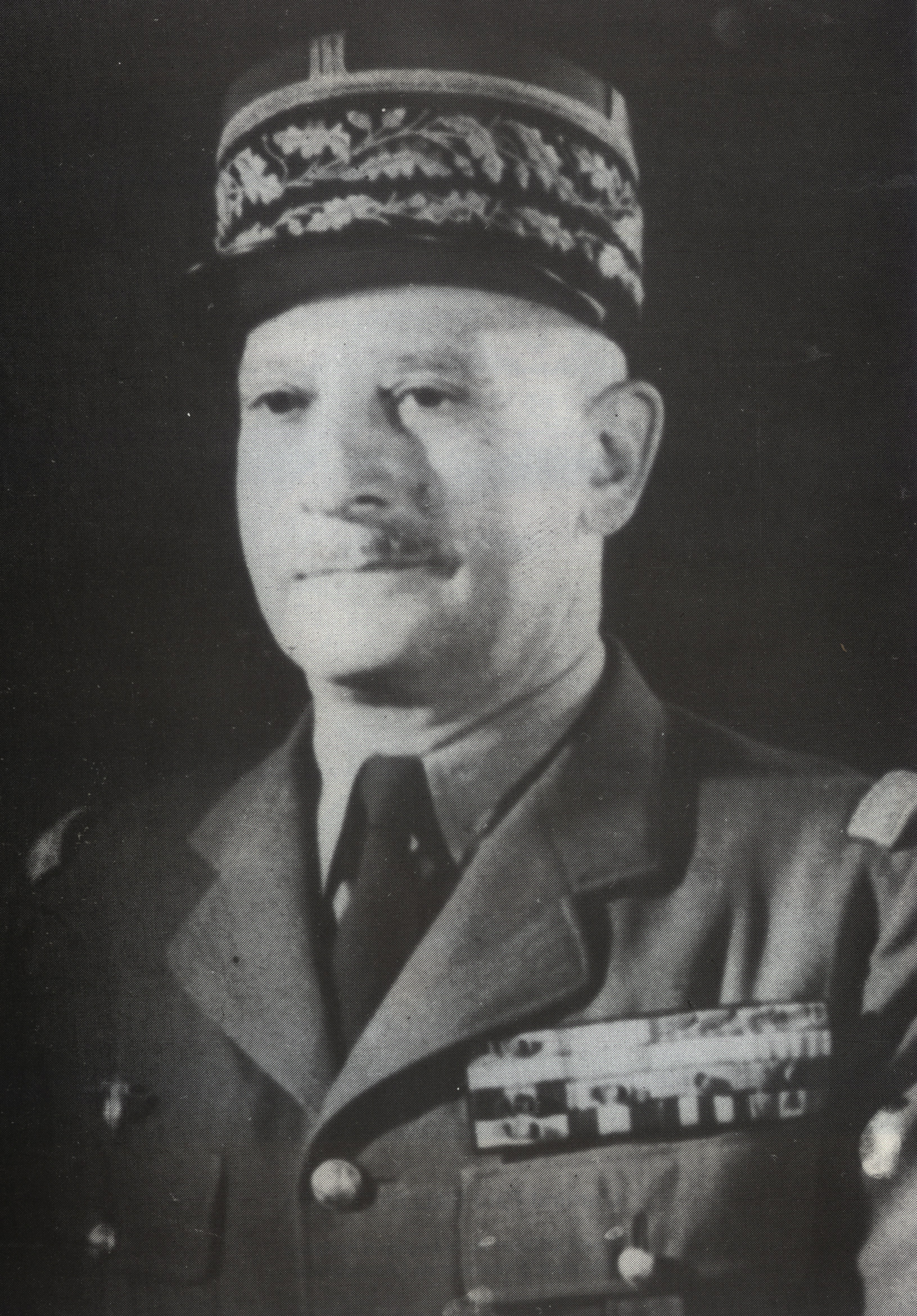
- General Peshkov, c.1944
- Born: Zinovy Mikhailovich Sverdlov; 16 October 1884; Nizhny Novgorod, Russian Empire
- Died: 27 November 1966 (aged 82); Paris, France
- Burial place: Russian Cemetery, Sainte-Geneviève-des-Bois, Essonne
- Relatives: Maxim Gorky (godfather) Yakov Sverdlov (brother)
- Military career
- Allegiance: French Third Republic; Russian State; Free France; French Fourth Republic
- Branch: French Foreign Legion
- Service years: 1914–1950
- Rank: Général de brigade
- Unit: 1st Foreign Regiment
- Conflicts: World War I Russian Civil War; Rif War; World War II
- Awards: Grand Cross of the Legion of Honour

Zinovy Alekseyevich Peshkov (Russian: Зиновий Алексеевич Пешков, French: Zinovi Pechkoff or Pechkov, 16 October 1884 – 27 November 1966) was a Russian-born French general and diplomat.

== Early life ==
Born as Zalman Sverdlov (in Russian: Zinovy Mikhailovich Sverdlov), he was the second child and eldest son in a Jewish family in Nizhny Novgorod. His father, Mikail Izraylevich (1846?-1921), was a coppersmith and copper engraver from the region of Białystok in the Kingdom of Poland. In 1896, Peshkov met Maxim Gorky. Zinovy was baptized on September 30, 1902, in the city church. He officially changed his name, adopting the real last name of Gorky, Peshkov, since the latter was his official godfather.

Peshkov fled the country during the Russo-Japanese war of 1904 to Canada. He met with Gorky again in Italy, in May 1907.

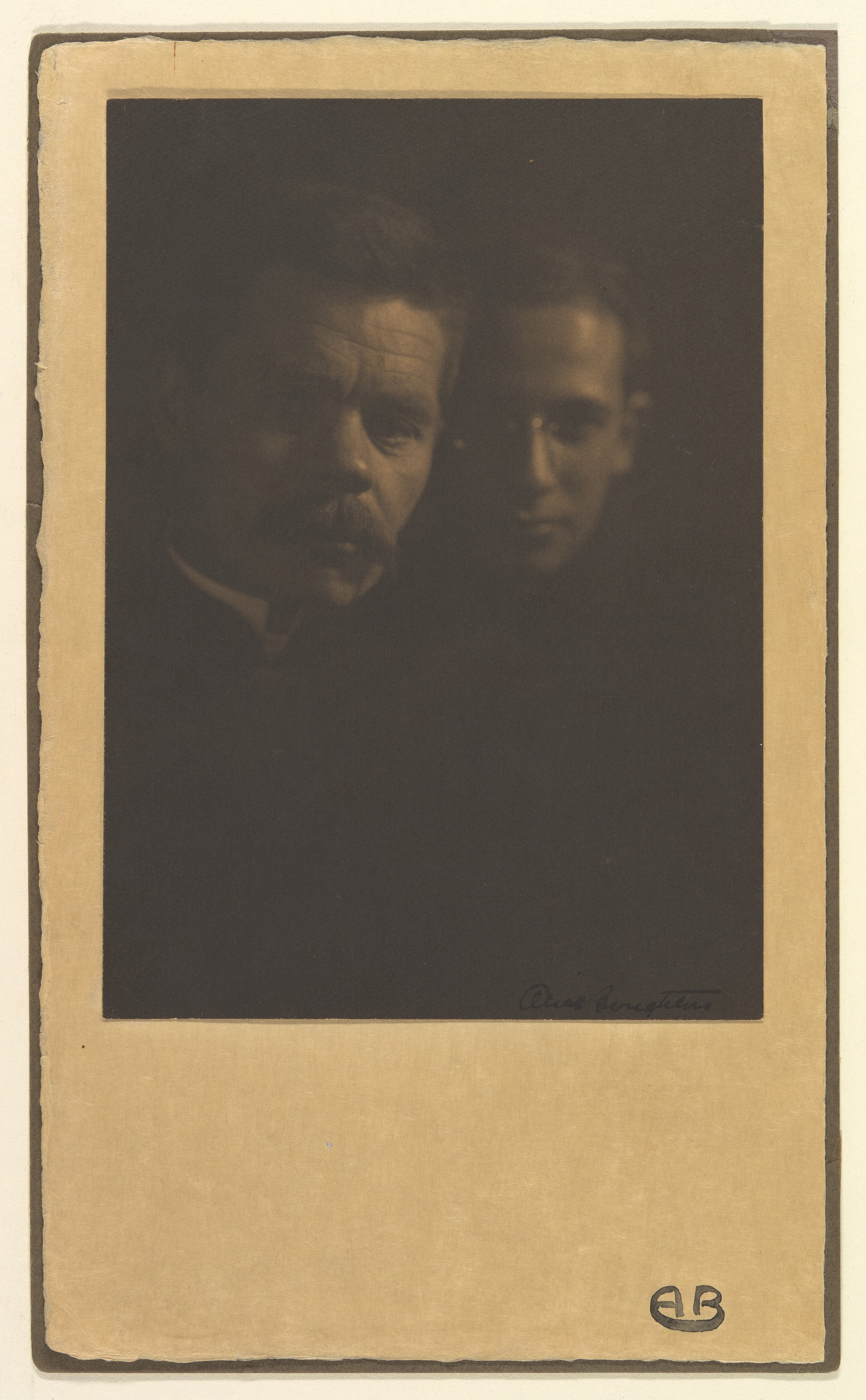
Maxim Gorky and Zena Peschkoff,(sic) His Adopted Son. Portrait photograph circa 1910, by Alice Boughton.

During October 1910, while staying at La Spezia, he married Lydia Bourago five days after meeting her. He emigrated with her to the United States, and they had a daughter, named Elizabeth. Shortly afterward, they were separated.

== Military service ==
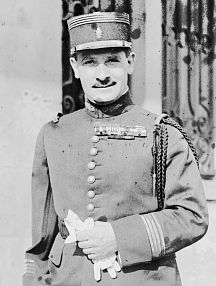
Major Peshkov, 1926

Peshkov enlisted on August 31, 1914 as EVDG (an acronym for “voluntary enlisted for the duration of the war”) in the marching battalion of the 1st Foreign Regiment. Peshkov was given the rank of 1st class on October 21, 1914, and named corporal on April 1, 1915. In May 1915, during combat with his division before Arras, he was seriously wounded. During the capture of Carency, a bullet shattered his left arm while he was leading his soldiers, resulting in its amputation. He then retired from service, and returned to Italy.

On June 22, 1916, Peshkov enlisted again for the duration of the war with the grade of 2nd class. He was attached to the 20th section of the military staff.

Aristide Briand, a French statesman, sent Zinovy to the French Ambassador, Jean Jules Jusserand, with the grade of temporary 3rd class interpreter (lieutenant), for the duration of his mission. At the end of nine months, Peshkov returned to Paris.

Peshkov was promoted to Captain on May 13, 1917. He was present for the October Revolution, and was promoted temporarily to head of a battalion for the duration of his mission from December 9, 1918. From 1918 he worked with Grigory Semyonov's anti-Bolshevik army in the far east of Russia and afterwards was part of Alexander Kolchak's White government at Omsk. In 1920 he went to Pyotr Wrangel's forces in Crimea, and accompanied this army into exile. Afterwards, Peshkov returned to Italy.

In May 1922, he was put at the disposal of Marshal Hubery Lyautey, commander of the troops in Morocco, to be attached to the staff of Meknes. He was then transferred to the 4th Foreign Infantry Regiment on February 17, 1923, where he commanded the 12th company. In June 1925, his left leg was injured during an attack at Bab Taza, “for the sake of symmetry” he quipped, showing the right sleeve of his uniform, useless for the past ten years.

He stayed at the French embassy in the United States from 1926 to 1929, but met with Gorky During holidays. He met his second wife, Jacqueline Delaunay-Belleville, the widow of a diplomat, but this marriage was quickly dissolved. He was positioned in North Africa, commander of the 3rd Battalion of the 2nd Foreign Regiment.

Peshkov joined General Charles de Gaulle in London after hearing his speech, the Appeal of 18 June. At the end of 1941, de Gaulle promoted him to the rank of colonel and sent him on a mission to South Africa, where he organized the transport of arms for Allied troops. Zinovy then arranged to be sent to French West Africa, where he organized the rallying of the colonies.

== Diplomatic career ==
Appointed Brigadier General in April 1944, Peshkov was soon sent as a delegate of the French Committee of National Liberation to the Republic of China to meet with Chiang Kai-shek, who had just broken with Vichy, arriving at Chung King, the new capital of the country due to the Japanese occupation. He was then made French ambassador to China in November 1944. He was then named French ambassador to Japan in 1946.

In 1950, Peshkov was retired and replaced by Maurice Dejean. He left Japan for a final return to Paris. Two years later, the government granted him the honor of the Grand Cross of the Legion of Honor.

He was sent to Chiang Kai-shek in 1964.

Peshkov died in Paris on 27 November 1966. His ashes are in the Sainte-Geneviève-des-Bois Russian Cemetery.

== Published work ==
The Foreign Legion in Morocco, 1927. With a preface by André Maurois. The author wrote this book in 1925 while in the military hospital of Rabat, being treated for the wound in his left leg received in combating the Rifians.

== Bibliography ==
- Mikhaïl Parkhomovski, Fils de Russie, général de France, Moscou, 1989.
- Francis Huré, Portraits de Pechkoff, De Fallois, Paris, 2006 (ISBN 2-87706-602-9)

== Sources ==
- Képi blanc et Division histoire et patrimoine de la Légion étrangère.
- ESS établi lors de sa libération par limite d'âge le 20 août 1940.
- Revue historique de l'armée, Légionnaire et diplomate, le capitaine Zinovi Pechkoff par J. Delmas, no 2, 1968.
- Who's who in France, 4e édition, notice "Zinovi Pechkoff", 1959-1960.
