= Russian Provisional Government =

1917 provisional government

- 9th Cabinet of Russia

- Date formed: 15 March [O.S. 2 March] 1917
- Date dissolved: 8 November [O.S. 26 October] 1917

People and organisations
- Head of state: Alexis II (unproclaimed); Michael II (conditionally); Georgy Lvov (de facto); Alexander Kerensky (de facto)
- Head of government: Georgy Lvov; Alexander Kerensky
- Deputy head of government: Alexander Kerensky
- Member parties: Progressive Bloc; Socialist-Revolutionaries; Mensheviks; Popular Socialists
- Status in legislature: Coalition
- Opposition cabinet: Executive Committee of Petrograd Soviet
- Opposition parties: Bolsheviks; Left Socialist-Revolutionaries
- Opposition leader: Nikolay Chkheidze

History
- Incoming formation: Golitsyn
- Outgoing formation: Kerensky I
- Predecessor: Nikolay Golitsyn
- Successor: Alexander Kerensky

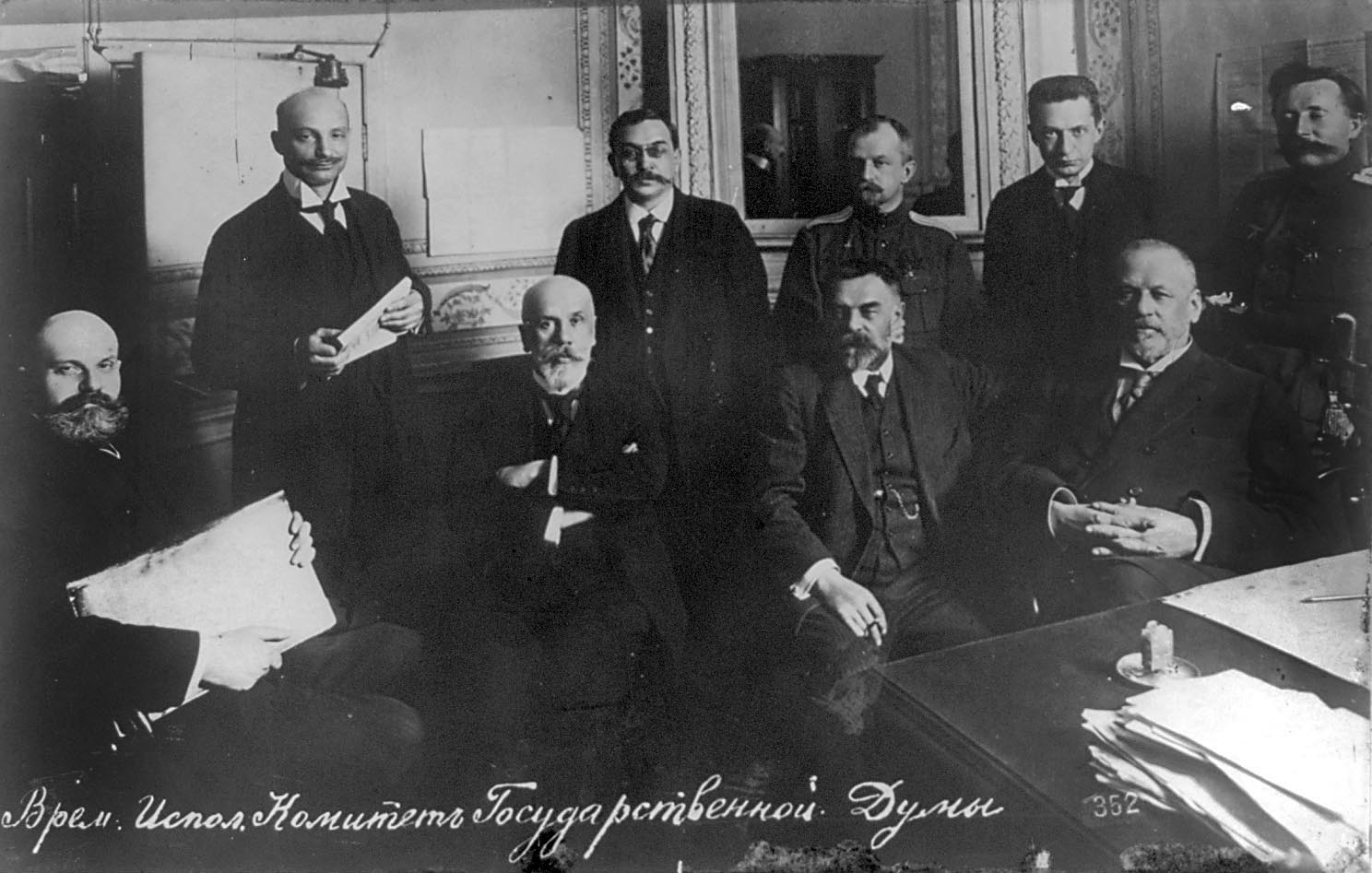
Nine members of the Provisional Committee of the State Duma in March 1917. From left to right: Seated: V. N. Lvov, V. A. Rzhevsky, S. I. Shidlovsky, and M. V. Rodzianko (chairman); Standing: V. V. Shulgin, B. A. Engelhardt, A. F. Kerensky, and M. A. Karaulov.

The Russian Provisional Government (Note: Russian: Вре́менное прави́тельство Росси́и, pre-reform orthography: Врѣ́менное прави́тельство Россі́и, romanized: Vrémennoye pravítel'stvo Rossíi) was a provisional government of the Russian Empire and Russian Republic, announced two days before and established immediately after the abdication of Nicholas II on 2 March, O.S. [15 March 1917, N.S.], during the February Revolution. The intention of the provisional government was the organization of elections to the Russian Constituent Assembly and its convention. The provisional government, led first by Prince Georgy Lvov and then by Alexander Kerensky, lasted approximately eight months, and ceased to exist when the Bolsheviks gained power in the October Revolution in October [November, N.S.] 1917.

According to Harold Whitmore Williams, the history of the eight months during which Russia was ruled by the Provisional Government was the history of the steady and systematic disorganization of the army. The Provisional Government was a caretaker government, with its political system and the status of the monarchy remaining unresolved until the election of the Constituent Assembly. This was finally clarified on 1 September [14 September, N.S.], when the Russian Republic was proclaimed, in a decree signed by Kerensky as Minister-President and Zarudny as Minister of Justice.

== Overview ==
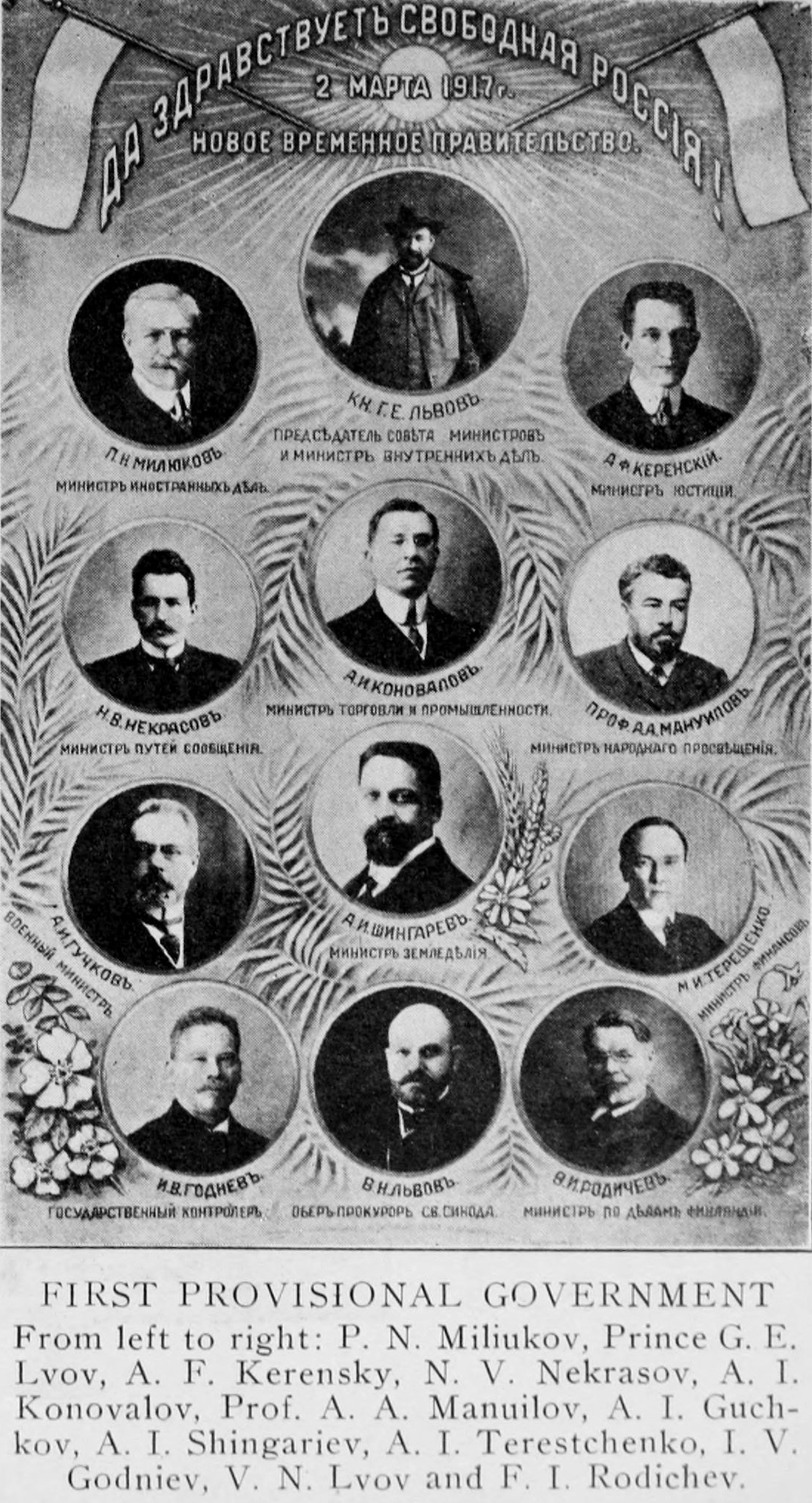
Twelve members of the Russian Provisional Government, from left to right: P. N. Milyukov, G. E. Lvov, A. F. Kerensky, N. V. Nekrasov, A. I. Konovalov, A. A. Manuilov, A. I. Guchkov, A. I. Shingariev, A. I. Terestchenko, I. V. Godniev, V. N. Lvov, and F. I. Rodichev. Poster published by the Russian Information Bureau, New York City, 1918.

On 12 March [27 February, O.S.], after Prime Minister Nikolai Golitsyn was forced to resign, 24 commissars of the Provisional Committee of the State Duma were appointed. The committee was headed by Mikhail Rodzianko and suspended the activity of the Fourth State Duma. He temporarily took formal state power and announced the creation of a new government on 13 March. The Provisional Government was formed on 15 March 1917 (N.S.) by the Provisional Committee in cooperation with the Petrograd Soviet, despite protests of the Bolsheviks. The government was led first by Prince Georgy Lvov and then by Alexander Kerensky. It replaced the Council of Ministers of Russia, which presided in the Mariinsky Palace.

The Provisional Government was unable to make decisive policy decisions due to political factionalism and a breakdown of state structures. This weakness left the government open to strong challenges from both the right and the left. The Provisional Government's chief adversary on the left was the Petrograd Soviet, a Communist committee then taking over and ruling Russia's most important port city, which tentatively cooperated with the government at first, but then gradually gained control of the Imperial Army, local factories, and the Russian Railway. The period of competition for authority ended in late October 1917, when Bolsheviks routed the ministers of the Provisional Government in the events known as the "October Revolution", and placed power in the hands of the soviets, or "workers' councils," which had given their support to the Bolsheviks led by Vladimir Lenin and Leon Trotsky. The weakness of the Provisional Government is perhaps best reflected in the derisive nickname given to Kerensky: "persuader-in-chief."

== Formation ==
The authority of the Tsar's government began disintegrating on 1 November 1916, when Pavel Milyukov attacked the Boris Stürmer government in the Duma. Stürmer was succeeded by Alexander Trepov and Nikolai Golitsyn, both Prime Ministers for only a few weeks. During the February Revolution two rival institutions, the imperial State Duma and the Petrograd Soviet, both located in the Tauride Palace, competed for power. Tsar Nicholas II abdicated on 2 March [15 March, N.S.], and Milyukov announced the committee's decision to offer the Regency to his brother, Grand Duke Michael, as the next tsar. Grand Duke Michael would accept after the decision of the Russian Constituent Assembly. He did not want to take the poisoned chalice and deferred acceptance of imperial power the next day. The Provisional Government was designed to set up elections to the Assembly while maintaining essential government services, but its power was effectively limited by the Petrograd Soviet's growing authority.

Public announcement of the formation of the Provisional Government was made. It was published in Izvestia the day after its formation. The announcement stated the declaration of government

- Full and immediate amnesty on all issues political and religious, including: terrorist acts, military uprisings, and agrarian crimes etc.
- Freedom of word, press, unions, assemblies, and strikes with spread of political freedoms to military servicemen within the restrictions allowed by military-technical conditions.
- Abolition of all hereditary, religious, and national class restrictions.
- Immediate preparations for the convocation on basis of universal, equal, secret, and direct vote for the Constituent Assembly which will determine the form of government and the constitution.
- Replacement of the police with a public militsiya and its elected chairmanship subordinated to the local authorities.
- Elections to the authorities of local self-government on basis of universal, direct, equal, and secret vote.
- Non-disarmament and non-withdrawal out of Petrograd the military units participating in the revolution movement.
- Under preservation of strict discipline in ranks and performing a military service – elimination of all restrictions for soldiers in the use of public rights granted to all other citizens.

It also said, "The provisional government feels obliged to add that it is not intended to take advantage of military circumstances for any delay in implementing the above reforms and measures."

=== World recognition ===
| Country | Date |
|---|---|
| United States | 22 March 1917 |
| United Kingdom | 24 March 1917 |
| France | 24 March 1917 |
| Italy | 24 March 1917 |

== Initial composition ==
Initial composition of the Provisional Government:

| Post | Name | Party | Time of appointment |
|---|---|---|---|
| Prime minister and Minister of the Interior | Georgy Lvov | | March 1917 |
| Minister of Foreign Affairs | Pavel Milyukov | Kadet | March 1917 |
| Minister of Foreign Affairs | Mikhail Tereshchenko | Non-Party | April 1917 |
| Minister of War and Navy | Alexander Guchkov | Octobrist | March 1917 |
| Minister of War and Navy | Alexander Kerensky | Socialist-Revolutionary Party | April 1917 |
| Minister of Transport | Nikolai Nekrasov | Kadet | March 1917 |
| Minister of Trade and Industry | Aleksandr Konovalov | Progressist | March 1917 |
| Minister of Justice | Alexander Kerensky | Socialist-Revolutionary Party | March 1917 |
| Minister of Justice | Pavel Pereverzev | Socialist-Revolutionary Party | April 1917 |
| Minister of Finance | Mikhail Tereshchenko | Non-Party | March 1917 |
| Minister of Finance | Andrei Shingarev | Kadet | April 1917 |
| Minister of Education | Alexander Manuilov | Kadet | March 1917 |
| Minister of Agriculture | Andrei Shingarev | Kadet | March 1917 |
| Minister of Agriculture | Victor Chernov | Socialist-Revolutionary Party | April 1917 |
| Minister of Labour | Matvey Skobelev | Menshevik | April 1917 |
| Minister of Food | Alexey Peshekhonov | Popular Socialists (Russia) | April 1917 |
| Minister of Post and Telegraph | Irakli Tsereteli | Menshevik | April 1917 |
| Ober-Procurator of the Most Holy Synod | Vladimir Lvov | Progressist | March 1917 |

== April Crisis ==
Kerensky First Government
- 10th Cabinet of Russia

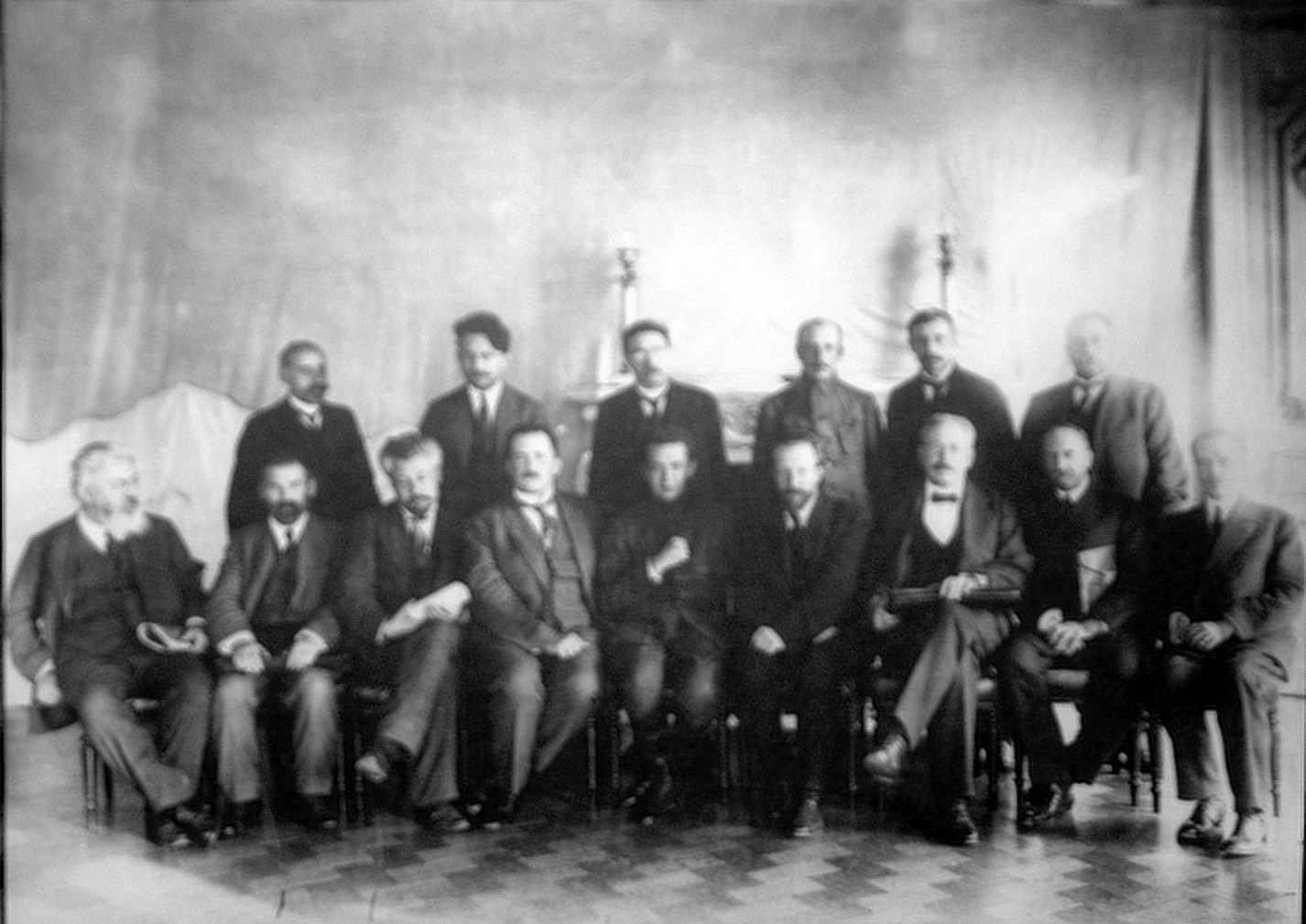
- Date formed: 24 July 1917 (see July Days)
- Date dissolved: 1 September 1917

People and organisations
- Head of state: Grand Duke Michael (conditionally); Alexander Kerensky (de facto)
- Head of government: Alexander Kerensky
- Member parties: Socialist-Revolutionaries; Mensheviks; Progressive Bloc; Popular Socialists
- Status in legislature: Coalition
- Opposition cabinet: Executive Committee of Petrograd Soviet
- Opposition parties: Bolsheviks; Left Socialist-Revolutionaries
- Opposition leader: Chkheidze/Trotsky

History
- Incoming formation: Lvov
- Outgoing formation: Kerensky II
- Predecessor: Georgy Lvov
- Successor: Alexander Kerensky

Kerensky Second Government
- 11th Cabinet of Russia

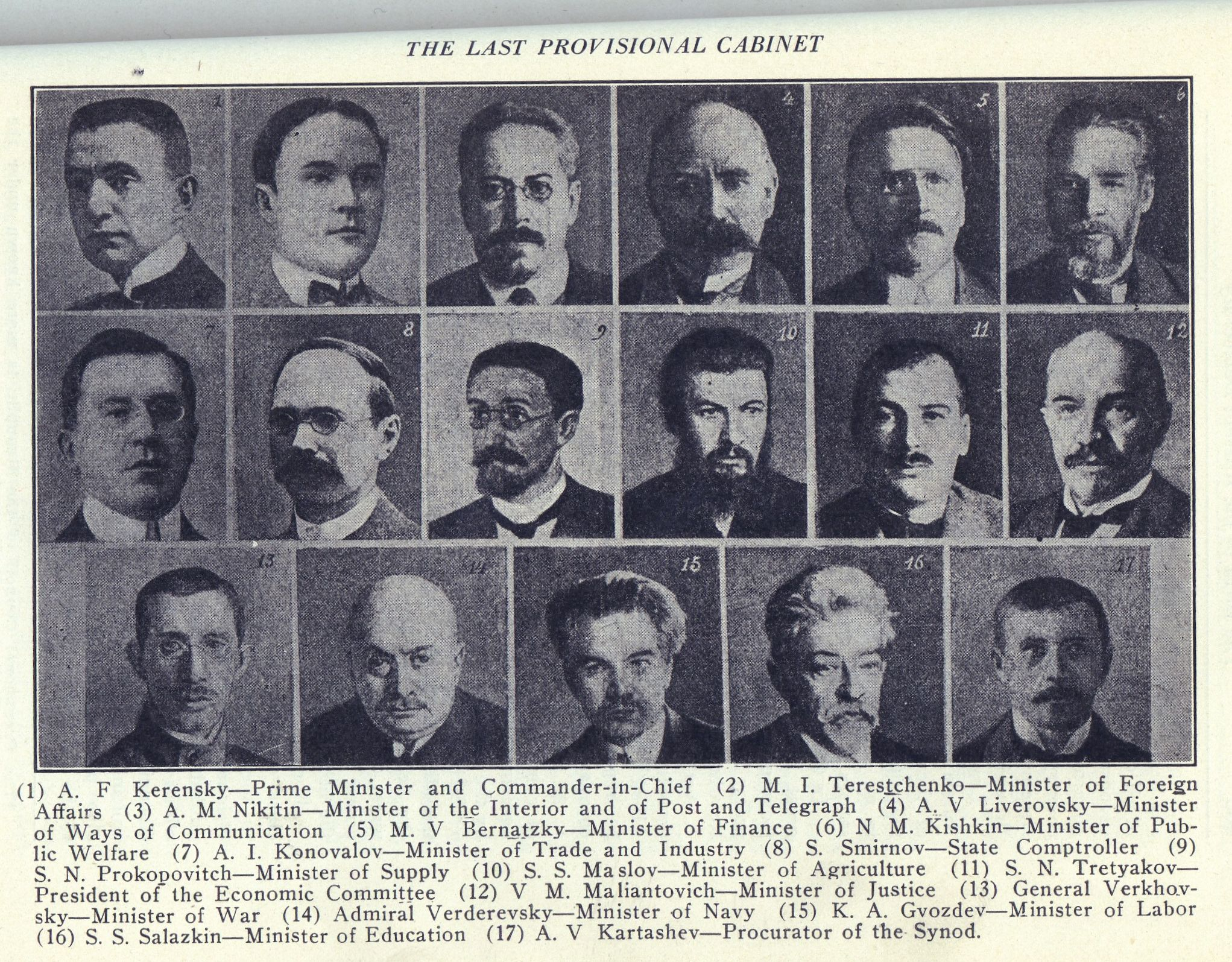
- Date formed: 14 September 1917
- Date dissolved: 7 November 1917

People and organisations
- Head of state: Grand Duke Michael (conditionally); Alexander Kerensky (de facto)
- Head of government: Alexander Kerensky
- Member parties: Socialist-Revolutionaries; Mensheviks; Progressive Bloc
- Status in legislature: Coalition
- Opposition cabinet: Executive Committee of Petrograd Soviet
- Opposition parties: Bolsheviks; Left Socialist-Revolutionaries
- Opposition leader: Nikolay Chkheidze / Leon Trotsky

History
- Incoming formation: Kerensky I
- Outgoing formation: Lenin
- Predecessor: Alexander Kerensky
- Successor: Vladimir Lenin

During the April Crisis (1917) Ivan Ilyin agreed with the Kadet Milyukov, who staunchly opposed Petrograd Soviet demands for peace at any cost. On 18 April [1 May, N.S.] 1917, minister of Foreign Affairs Pavel Milyukov sent a note to the Allied governments, promising to continue the war to 'its glorious conclusion'. On 20–21 April 1917, massive demonstrations of workers and soldiers erupted against the continuation of war. Demonstrations demanded resignation of Milyukov. They were soon met by the counter-demonstrations organised in his support. General Lavr Kornilov, commander of the Petrograd military district, wished to suppress the disorders, but premier Georgy Lvov refused to resort to violence.

The Provisional Government accepted the resignation of Foreign Minister Milyukov and War Minister Guchkov and made a proposal to the Petrograd Soviet to form a coalition government. As a result of negotiations, on 22 April 1917, agreement was reached and 6 socialist ministers joined the cabinet.

During this period the Provisional Government merely reflected the will of the Soviet, where left tendencies (Bolshevism) were gaining ground. The Government, however, influenced by the "bourgeois" ministers, tried to base itself on the right wing of the Soviet. Socialist ministers, coming under fire from their left-wing Soviet associates, were compelled to pursue a double-faced policy. The Provisional Government was unable to make decisive policy decisions due to political factionalism and a breakdown of state structures.

== Kerensky's June Offensive ==
In the summer of 1917, within the government, the liberals persuaded the socialists that the Provisional Government needed to launch an offensive against Germany. This was as a consequence of several factors: a request from Britain and France to help take the pressure off their forces in the West, avoiding the national humiliation of a defeat, to help put the generals and officers back in control of the armed forces so they could control the revolution and to place them in a better bargaining position with the Germans when peace negotiations started.

The government agreed that a 'successful military offensive' was required to unite the people and restore morale to the Russian army. Alexander Kerensky, Minister for War, embarked on a 'whirlwind tour' of the Russian forces at the fronts, giving passionate, 'near-hysterical', speeches where he called on troops to act heroically, stating 'we revolutionaries, have the right to death.' This worked for a time until Kerensky left and the effect on the troops waned.

The June Offensive, which started on 16 June, lasted for just three days before falling apart. During the offensive, the rate of desertion was high and soldiers began to mutiny, with some even killing their commanding officers instead of fighting.

The offensive resulted in the death of thousands of Russian soldiers and great loss of territory. This failed military offensive produced an immediate effect in Petrograd in the form of an armed uprising known as the 'July Days'. The Provisional Government survived the initial uprising, but their pro-war position meant that moderate socialist government leaders lost their credibility among the soldiers and workers.

== July crisis and second coalition government ==
On July 2 [July 15, N.S.], in response to the government's compromises with Ukrainian nationalists, the Kadet members of the cabinet resigned, leaving Prince Lvov's government in disarray. This prompted further urban demonstrations, as workers demanded "all power to the Soviets."

On the morning of July 3 (July 16), the machine-gun regiment voted in favour of an armed demonstration, with it agreed that the demonstrators should march peacefully to the front of the Tauride palace and elect delegates to 'present their demands to the executive committee of the Soviet'.

The following day, July 4 (July 17), around 20,000 armed sailors from the Kronstadt naval base arrived in Petrograd. The mass of soldiers and workers then went to the Bolshevik Headquarters to find Lenin, who addressed the crowd and promised them that, ultimately, all power would go to the Soviets. However, Lenin was rather reluctant about these developments, with his speech uncertain and barely lasting a minute.

As violence escalated in the streets with the mob looting shops, houses, and attacking well-dressed civilians, Cossacks and Kadets stationed atop the buildings of Liteyny Avenue began to fire upon the crowds, causing the marchers to scatter in panic as dozens were killed.

At around 7 pm, soldiers and a group of workers from the Putilov iron plant broke into the palace and, flourishing their rifles, demanded full power to the Soviets.

When Socialist Revolutionary Minister Chernov attempted to calm them down, he was taken outside as a hostage until Trotsky appeared from the Soviet assembly and intervened with a speech praising the "Comrade Kronstadter's, pride and glory of the Russian revolution".

Furthermore, the Menshevik Chairman of the Soviet, Chkheidze, spoke to the demonstrators in an 'imperious tone', calmly handing their leader a Soviet manifesto, and ordered them to return home or be condemned as traitors to the revolution, to which the crowd quickly dispersed.

The Ministry of Justice released leaflets accusing the Bolsheviks of treason on the charge of inciting armed rebellion with German financial support, and published warrants for the arrest of the party's main leaders. Following this, troops cleared the party's Headquarters in the Kshesinskaya Mansion, and the capital quickly succumbed to anti-Bolshevik hysteria as hundreds of Bolsheviks were arrested and known or suspected Bolsheviks were attacked in the streets by Black Hundreds elements. The Petrograd Soviet was forced to move from Tauride Palace into the Smolny Institute.

Trotsky was captured a few days later and imprisoned, whilst Lenin and Zinoviev went into hiding. Lenin had refused to stand trial for 'treason' as he argued that the state was in the hands of a 'counter-revolutionary military dictatorship', which was already engaged in a 'civil war' against the proletariat. Lenin believed that these events were "an episode in the civil war" and described how "all hopes for a peaceful development of the Russian revolution have vanished for good" when writing a few days after his flight.

These developments left a new crisis in the Provisional Government. Bourgeois ministers, belonging to the Constitutional Democratic Party resigned, and no cabinet could be formed until the end of the month.

The party's political fortunes were poor but were revived after an abortive 'coup d'état' by right-wing elements led by General Kornilov.

Kerensky became the new Prime Minister of the Provisional Government on the 21st of July. Prince Lvov had resigned along with many Bourgeois ministers from the Provisional Government. He had been considered to be closely associated with the soviets, and in a strong leading position.

Finally, on the 24th of July (6 August) 1917, a new coalition cabinet, composed mostly of socialists, was formed with Kerensky at its head.

Second coalition:

| Post | Name | Party |
|---|---|---|
| Minister-President and Minister of War and Navy | Alexander Kerensky | Socialist-Revolutionary Party |
| Vice-president, Minister of Finance | Nikolai Nekrasov | Kadet |
| Minister of Foreign Affairs | Mikhail Tereshchenko | Non-party |
| Minister of Internal Affairs | Nikolai Avksentiev | Socialist-Revolutionary Party |
| Minister of Transport | Piotr Yurenev | Kadet |
| Minister of Trade and Industry | Sergei Prokopovich | Non-party |
| Minister of Justice | Alexander Zarudny | Popular Socialists (Russia) |
| Minister of Education | Sergey Oldenburg | Kadet |
| Minister of Agriculture | Victor Chernov | Socialist-Revolutionary Party |
| Minister of Labour | Matvey Skobelev | Menshevik |
| Minister of Food | Alexey Peshekhonov | Popular Socialists (Russia) |
| Minister of Health Care | Ivan Efremov | Progressive Party (Russia) |
| Minister of Post and Telegraph | Alexey Nikitin | Menshevik |
| Ober-Procurator of the Most Holy Synod | Vladimir Lvov | Progressist |

== Third coalition ==
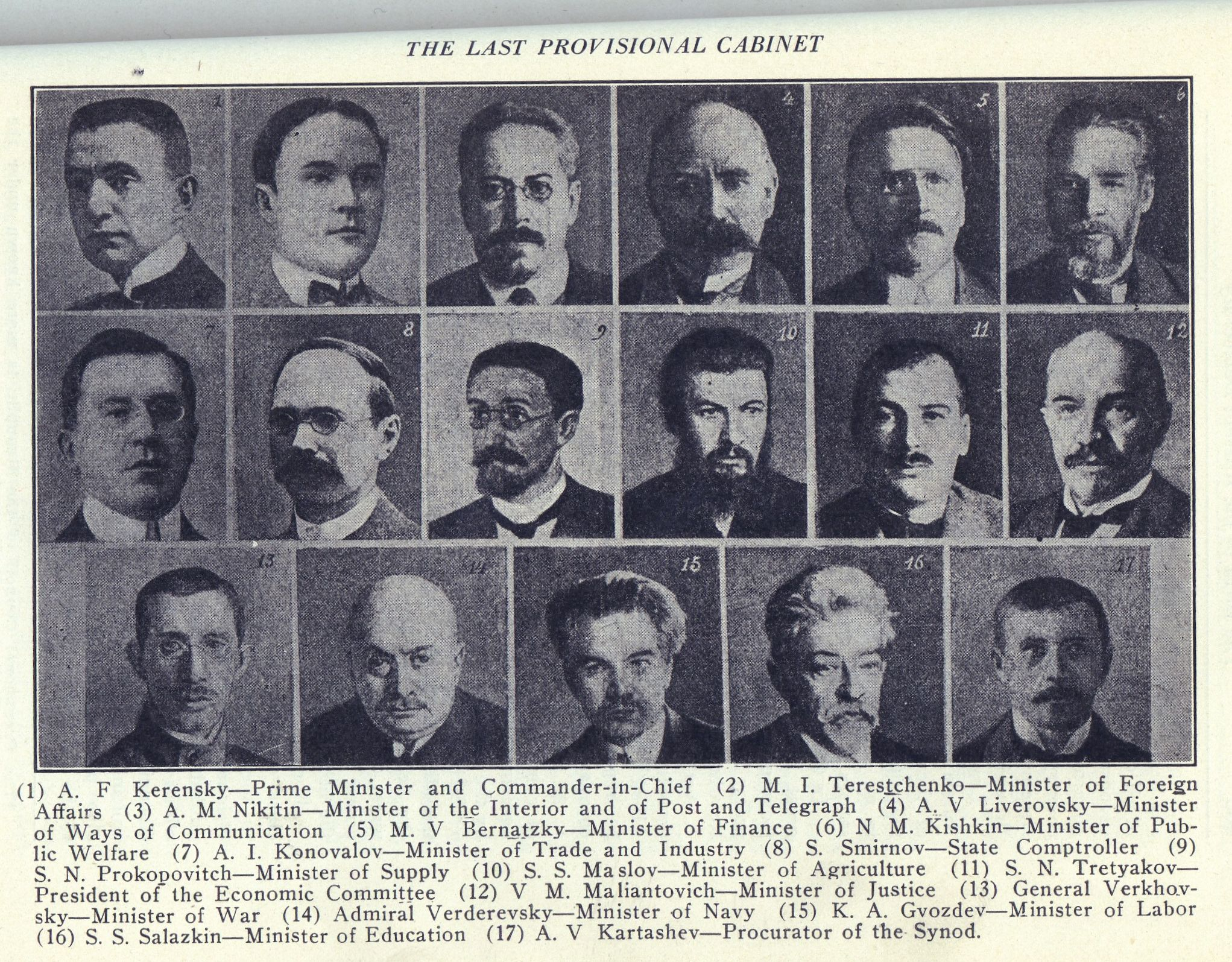
Third Russian Provisional Government

From 25 September [8 October, N.S.] 1917.

| Post | Name | Party |
|---|---|---|
| Minister-President | Alexander Kerensky | Socialist-Revolutionary Party |
| Vice-president, Minister of Trade and Industry | Aleksandr Konovalov | Kadets |
| Minister of Foreign Affairs | Mikhail Tereshchenko | Non-party |
| Minister of Internal Affairs, Post and Telegraph | Alexey Nikitin | Menshevik |
| Minister of War | Alexander Verkhovsky | |
| Minister of Navy | Dmitry Verderevsky | – |
| Minister of Finance | Mikhail Bernatsky | |
| Minister of Justice | Pavel Malyantovitch | Menshevik |
| Minister of Transport | Alexander Liverovsky | Non-party |
| Minister of Education | Sergei Salazkin | Non-party |
| Minister of Agriculture | Semen Maslov | Socialist-Revolutionary Party |
| Minister of Labour | Kuzma Gvozdev | Menshevik |
| Minister of Food | Sergei Prokopovich | Non-party |
| Minister of Health Care | Nikolai Kishkin | Kadet |
| Minister of Post and Telegraph | Alexey Nikitin | Menshevik |
| Minister of Religion | Anton Kartashev | Kadet |
| Minister of Public Charities | Nikolai Kishkin | Kadet |

== Legislative policies and problems ==
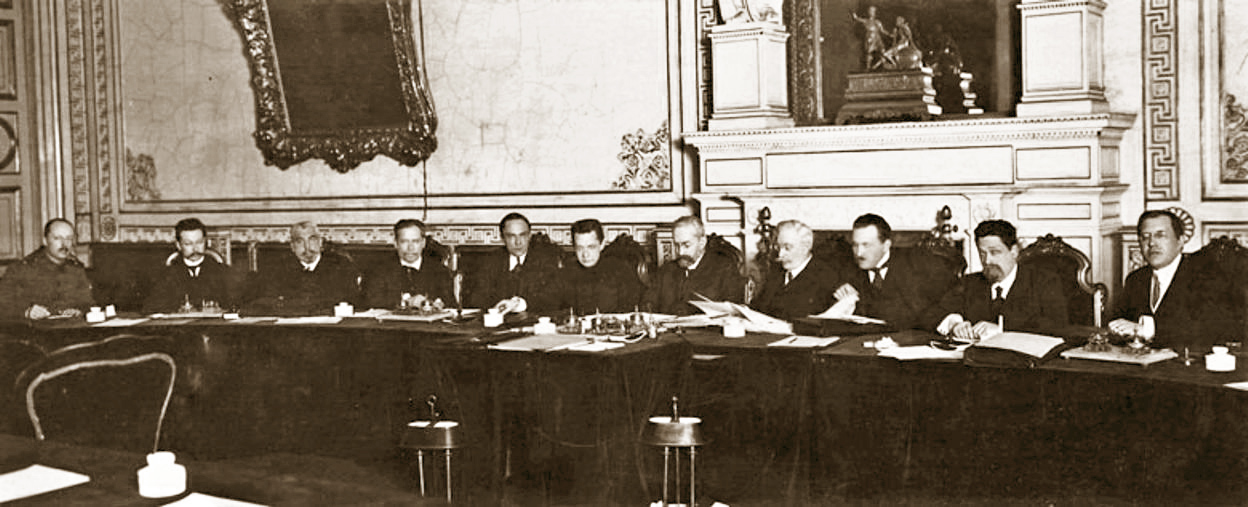
Eleven members of Russian Provisional Government in March 1917

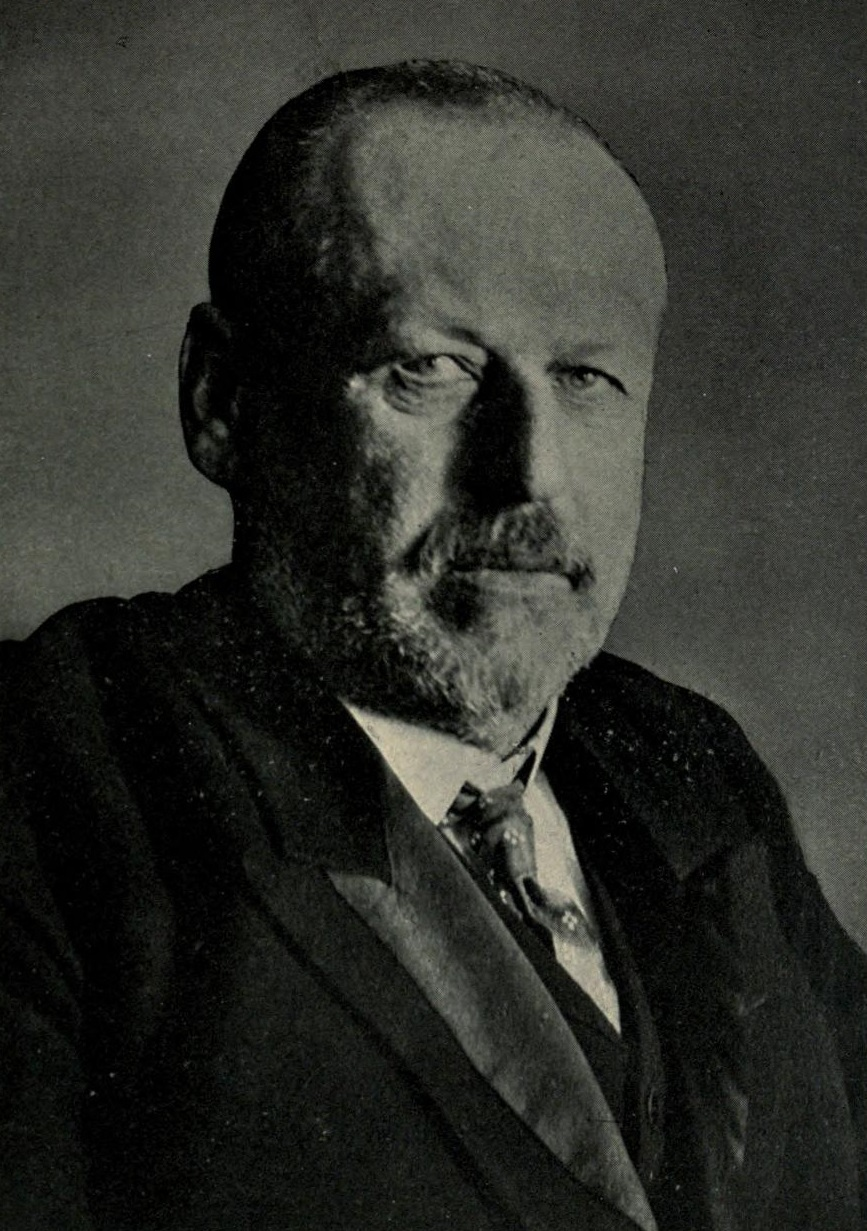
Mikhail Rodzianko

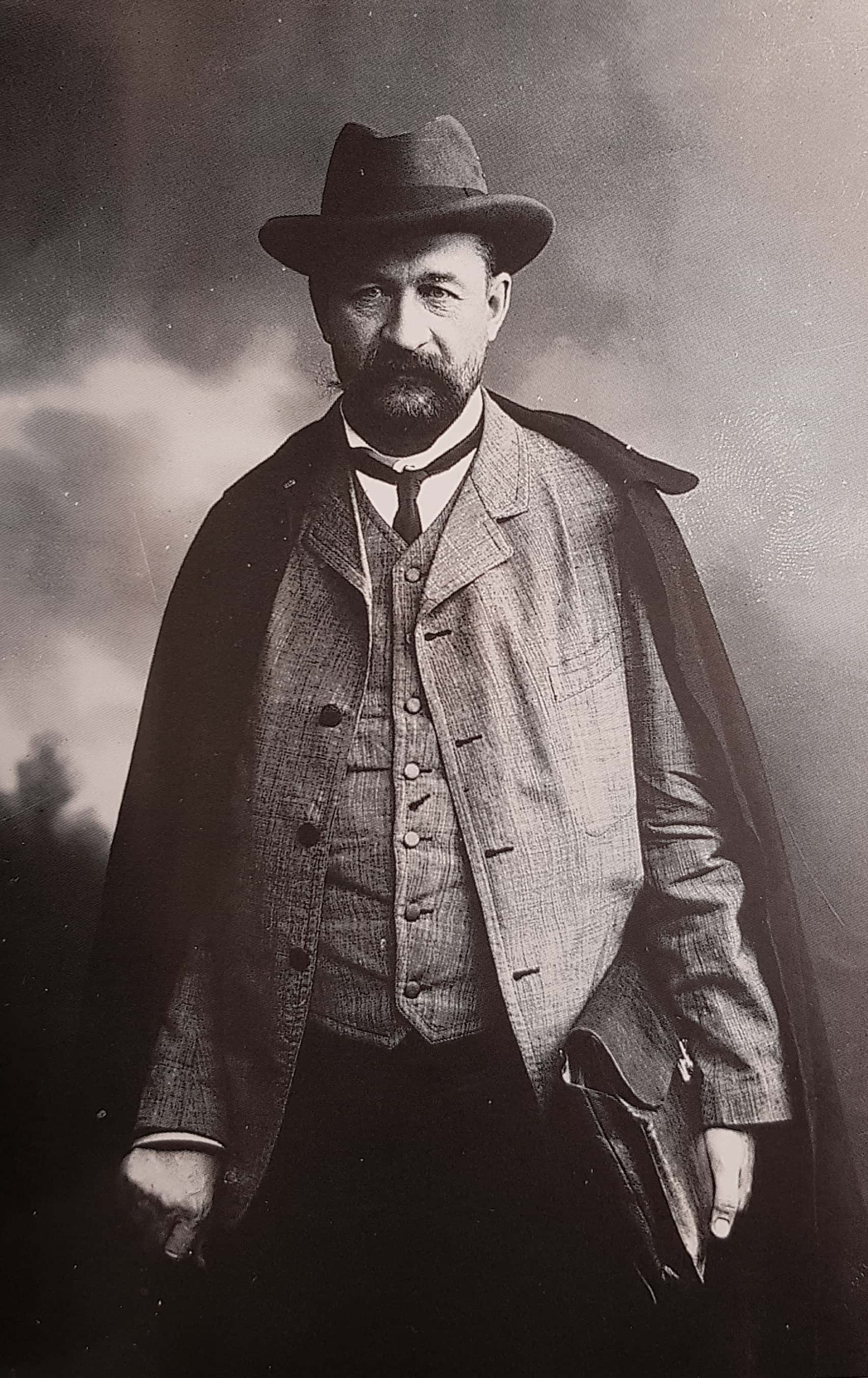
Georgy Lvov as Prime Minister in March 1917

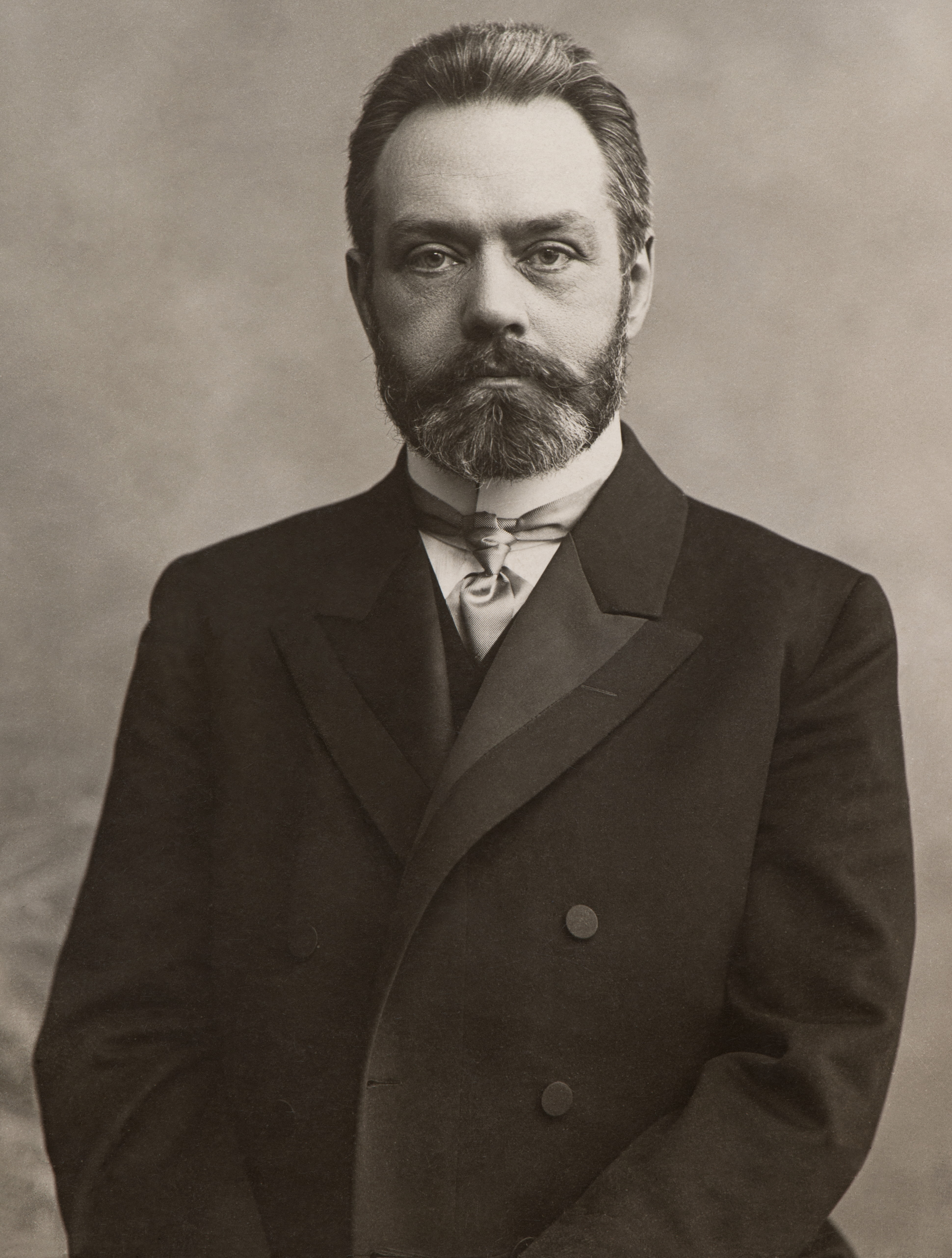
Alexander Guchkov - Finnish Heritage Agency

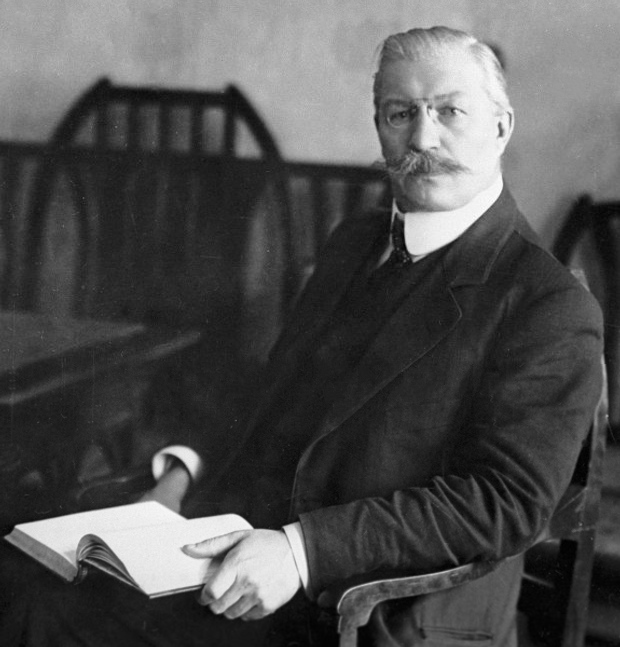
Pavel Milyukov c. 1917

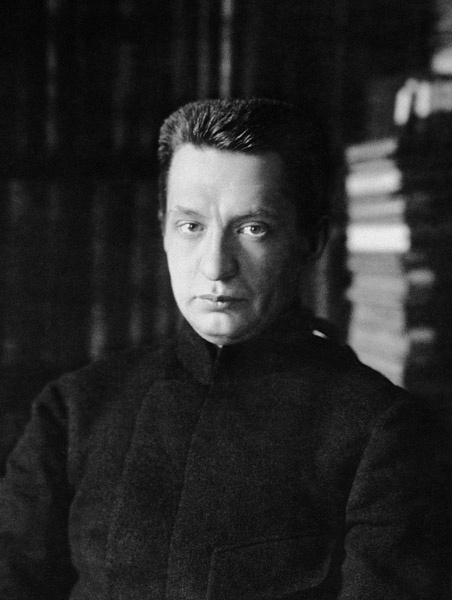
Alexander Kerensky in 1917

With the 1917 February Revolution, Tsar Nicholas II's abdication, and the formation of a completely new Russian state, Russia's political spectrum was dramatically altered. The tsarist leadership represented an authoritarian, conservative form of governance. The Kadet Party (see Constitutional Democratic Party), composed mostly of liberal intellectuals, formed the greatest opposition to the tsarist regime leading up to the February Revolution. The Kadets transformed from an opposition force into a role of established leadership, as the former opposition party held most of the power in the new Provisional Government, which replaced the tsarist regime. The February Revolution was also accompanied by further politicization of the masses. Politicization of working people led to the leftward shift of the political spectrum.

Many urban workers originally supported the socialist Menshevik Party (see Menshevik), while some, though a small minority in February, favored the more radical Bolshevik Party (see Bolshevik). The Mensheviks often supported the actions of the Provisional Government and believed that the existence of such a government was a necessary step to achieve Communism. On the other hand, the Bolsheviks violently opposed the Provisional Government and desired a more rapid transition to Communism. In the countryside, political ideology also shifted leftward, with many peasants supporting the Socialist Revolutionary Party (see Socialist-Revolutionary Party). The SRs advocated a form of agrarian socialism and land policy that the peasantry overwhelmingly supported. For the most part, urban workers supported the Mensheviks and Bolsheviks (with greater numbers supporting the Bolsheviks as 1917 progressed), while the peasants supported the Socialist Revolutionaries. The rapid development and popularity of these leftist parties turned moderate-liberal parties, such as the Kadets, into "new conservatives." The Provisional Government was mostly composed of "new conservatives," and the new government faced tremendous opposition from the left.

Opposition was most obvious with the development and dominance of the Petrograd Soviet, which represented the socialist views of leftist parties. A dual power structure quickly arose consisting of the Provisional Government and the Petrograd Soviet. While the Provisional Government retained the formal authority to rule over Russia, the Petrograd Soviet maintained actual power. With its control over the army and the railroads, the Petrograd Soviet had the means to enforce policies. The Provisional Government lacked the ability to administer its policies. In fact, local soviets, political organizations mostly of socialists, often maintained discretion when deciding whether or not to implement the Provisional Government's laws.

Despite its short reign of power and implementation shortcomings, the Provisional Government passed very progressive legislation. The policies enacted by this moderate government (by 1917 Russian standards) represented arguably the most liberal legislation in Europe at the time. The independence of Church from state, the emphasis on rural self-governance, and the affirmation of fundamental civil rights (such as freedom of speech, press, and assembly) that the tsarist government had periodically restricted shows the progressivism of the Provisional Government. Other policies included the abolition of capital punishment and economic redistribution in the countryside. The Provisional Government also granted more freedoms to previously suppressed regions of the Russian Empire. Poland was granted independence and Lithuania and Ukraine became more autonomous.

The main obstacle and problem of the Provisional Government was its inability to enforce and administer legislative policies. Foreign policy was the one area in which the Provisional Government was able to exercise its discretion to a great extent. However, the continuation of aggressive foreign policy (for example, the Kerensky Offensive) increased opposition to the government. Domestically, the Provisional Government's weaknesses were blatant. The dual power structure was in fact dominated by one side, the Petrograd Soviet. Minister of War Alexander Guchkov stated that "We (the Provisional Government) do not have authority, but only the appearance of authority; the real power lies with the Soviet". Severe limitations existed on the Provisional Government's ability to rule.

While it was true that the Provisional Government lacked enforcement ability, prominent members within the Government encouraged bottom-up rule. Politicians such as Prime Minister Georgy Lvov favored devolution of power to decentralized organizations. The Provisional Government did not desire the complete decentralization of power, but certain members definitely advocated more political participation by the masses in the form of grassroots mobilization.

== Democratization ==
The rise of local organizations, such as trade unions and rural institutions, and the devolution of power within the Russian government gave rise to democratization. It is difficult to say that the Provisional Government desired the rise of these powerful, local institutions. As stated in the previous section, some politicians within the Provisional Government advocated the rise of these institutions. Local government bodies had discretionary authority when deciding which Provisional Government laws to implement. For example, institutions that held power in rural areas were quick to implement national laws regarding the peasantry's use of idle land. Real enforcement power was in the hands of these local institutions and the soviets. Russian historian W.E. Mosse points out, this time period represented "the only time in modern Russian history when the Russian people were able to play a significant part in the shaping of their destinies". While this quote romanticizes Russian society under the Provisional Government, the quote nonetheless shows that important democratic institutions were prominent in 1917 Russia.

Special interest groups also developed throughout 1917. Special interest groups play a large role in every society deemed "democratic" today, and such was the case of Russia in 1917. Many on the far left would argue that the presence of special interest groups represent a form of bourgeois democracy, in which the interests of an elite few are represented to a greater extent than the working masses. The rise of special interest organizations gave people the means to mobilize and play a role in the democratic process. While groups such as trade unions formed to represent the needs of the working classes, professional organizations were also prominent. Professional organizations quickly developed a political side to represent member's interests. The political involvement of these groups represents a form of democratic participation as the government listened to such groups when formulating policy. Such interest groups played a negligible role in politics before February 1917 and after October 1917.

While professional special interest groups were on the rise, so too were worker organizations, especially in the cities. Beyond the formation of trade unions, factory committees of workers rapidly developed on the plant level of industrial centers. The factory committees represented the most radical viewpoints of the time period. The Bolsheviks gained their popularity within these institutions. Nonetheless, these committees represented the most democratic element of 1917 Russia. However, this form of democracy differed from and went beyond the political democracy advocated by the liberal intellectual elites and moderate socialists of the Provisional Government. Workers established economic democracy, as employees gained managerial power and direct control over their workplace. Worker self-management became a common practice throughout industrial enterprises. As workers became more militant and gained more economic power, they supported the radical Bolshevik party and lifted the Bolsheviks into power in October 1917.

== Kornilov affair and declaration of the Republic ==
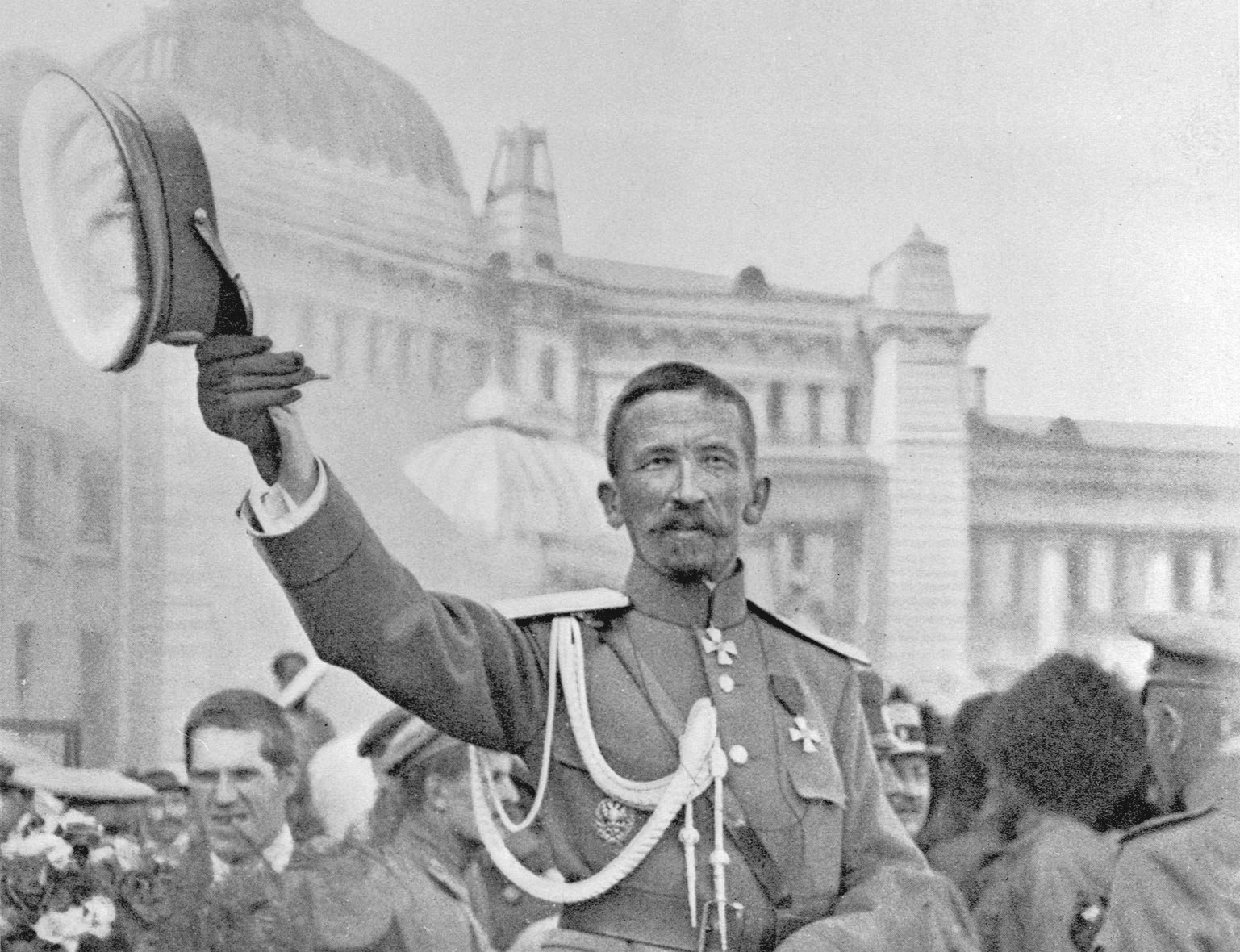
Lavr Kornilov in Moscow c. 1917

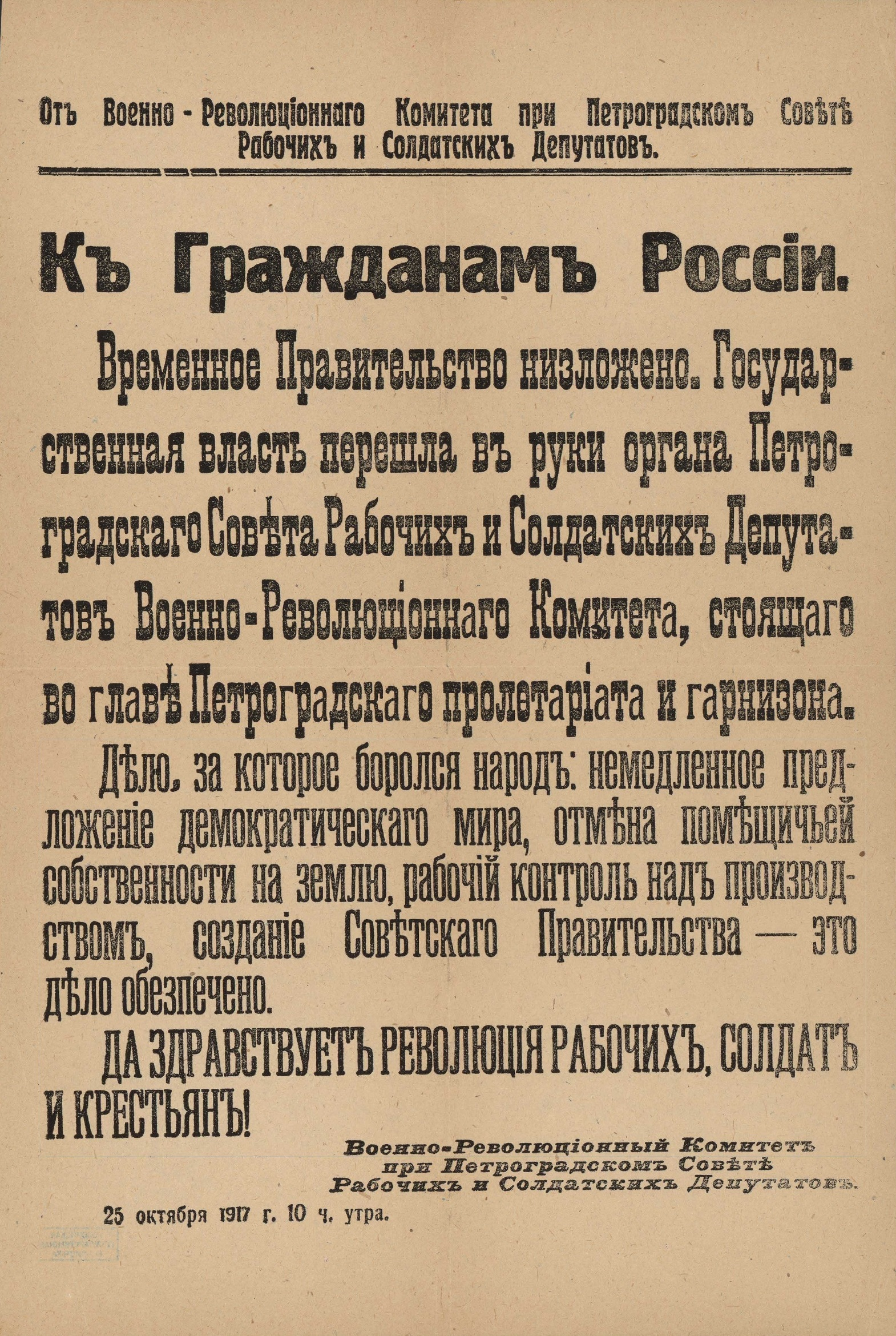
Milrevcom proclamation about the overthrowing of the Provisional Government

In August 1917, Russian socialists assembled for a conference on defense, which resulted in a split between the Bolsheviks, who rejected the continuation of the war, and moderate socialists. The Kornilov affair was an attempted military coup d'état by the then commander-in-chief of the Russian army, General Lavr Kornilov, in September 1917 [August, O.S.]. Due to the extreme weakness of the government at this point, there was talk among the elites of bolstering its power by including Kornilov as a military dictator on the side of Kerensky. The extent to which this deal had indeed been accepted by all parties is still unclear. What is clear, however, is that when Kornilov's troops approached Petrograd, Kerensky branded them as counter-revolutionaries and demanded their arrest. This move can be seen as an attempt to bolster his own power by making him a defender of the revolution against a Napoleon-type figure. However, it had terrible consequences, as Kerensky's move was seen in the army as a betrayal of Kornilov, making them finally disloyal to the Provisional Government. Furthermore, as Kornilov's troops were arrested by the now armed Red Guard, it was the Soviet that was seen to have saved the country from military dictatorship. In order to defend himself and Petrograd, he provided the Bolsheviks with arms as he had little support from the army. When Kornilov did not attack Kerensky, the Bolsheviks did not return their weapons, making them a greater concern to Kerensky and the Provisional Government.

Thus far, the status of the monarchy had been unresolved. This was clarified on 1 September [14 September, N.S.], when the Russian Republic (Российская республика, Rossiyskaya respublika) was proclaimed, in a decree signed by Kerensky as Minister-President and Zarudny as Minister of Justice.

The Decree read as follows:

The Coup of General Kornilov is suppressed. But the turmoil that he spread in the ranks of the army and in the country is great. Once again, a great danger threatens the fate of the country and its freedom. Considering it necessary to put an end to the uncertainty in the political system, and keeping in mind the unanimous and enthusiastic recognition of Republican ideas, which affected the Moscow State Conference, the Provisional Government announces that the state system of the Russian state is the republican system and proclaims the Russian Republic. Urgent need for immediate and decisive action to restore the shocked state system has prompted the Provisional Government to pass the power of government to five individuals from its staff, headed by the Prime Minister. The Provisional Government considers its main objective to be the restoration of public order and the fighting efficiency of the armed forces. Believing that only the concentration of all the surviving forces of the country can help the Motherland out of the difficulty in which it now finds itself, the Provisional Government will seek to expand its membership by attracting to its ranks all those who consider the eternal and general interests of the country more important than the short-term and particular needs of certain parties or classes. The Provisional Government has no doubt that it will succeed in this task in the days ahead.

On 12 September [25, N.S] an All-Russian Democratic Conference was convened, and its presidium decided to create a Pre-Parliament and a Special Constituent Assembly, which was to elaborate the future Constitution of Russia. This Constitutional Assembly was to be chaired by Professor N. I. Lazarev and the historian V. M. Gessen. The Provisional Government was expected to continue to administer Russia until the Constituent Assembly had determined the future form of government. On 16 September 1917, the Duma was dissolved by the newly created Directorate.

== October Revolution ==
On October 24, Kerensky accused the Bolsheviks of treason. After the Bolshevik walkout, some of the remaining delegates continued to stress that ending the war as soon as possible was beneficial to the nation. On 24–26 October Red Guard forces under the leadership of Bolshevik commanders launched their final attack on the ineffectual Provisional Government. Most government offices were occupied and controlled by Bolshevik soldiers on the 25th; the last holdout of the Provisional Ministers, the Tsar's Winter Palace on the Neva River bank, was captured on the 26th. Kerensky escaped the Winter Palace raid and fled to Pskov, where he rallied some loyal troops for an attempt to retake the capital. His troops managed to capture Tsarskoe Selo but were beaten the next day at Pulkovo. Kerensky spent the next few weeks in hiding before fleeing the country. He went into exile in France and eventually emigrated to the United States.

The Bolsheviks then replaced the government with their own. The Little Council (or Underground Provisional Government) met at the house of Sofia Panina briefly in an attempt to resist the Bolsheviks. However, this initiative ended on 28 November with the arrest of Panina, Fyodor Kokoshkin, Andrei Ivanovich Shingarev and Prince Pavel Dolgorukov, then Panina being the subject of a political trial.

Some academics, such as Pavel Osinsky, argue that the October Revolution was as much a function of the failures of the Provisional Government as it was of the strength of the Bolsheviks. Osinsky described this as "socialism by default" as opposed to "socialism by design."

Riasanovsky argued that the Provisional Government made perhaps its "worst mistake" by not holding elections to the Constituent Assembly soon enough. They wasted time fine-tuning details of the election law, while Russia slipped further into anarchy and economic chaos. By the time the Assembly finally met, Riasanovsky noted, "the Bolsheviks had already gained control of Russia."

== See also ==
- Bibliography of the Russian Revolution and Civil War
- Outline of the Russian Revolution and Civil War
- Index of articles related to the Russian Revolution and Civil War
- All-Russian Central Executive Committee
- Black Hundreds
- Diplomatic history of World War I
  - International relations of the Great Powers (1814–1919)
- Moscow Military Revolutionary Committee
- Petrograd Military Revolutionary Committee
- Russian entry into World War I
- White movement
- Russian Army (1917)
- Vikzhel negotiations
