= Theodora Komnene, Queen of Jerusalem =

Queen of Jerusalem from 1158 to 1162

Theodora Komnene
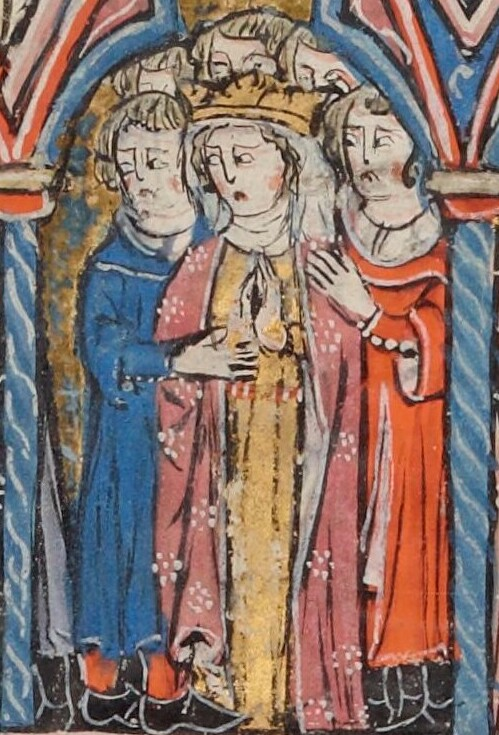

Queen consort of Jerusalem
- Tenure: 1158–10 February 1163
- Born: c. 1145
- Died: Likely before 1182
- Spouse: Baldwin III of Jerusalem (m. 1158; died 1163)
- Issue: Alexios Komnenos; Eirene Komnene
- House: Komnenos
- Father: Isaac Komnenos
- Mother: Eirene Synadene

Theodora Komnene (Ancient Greek: Θεοδώρα Κομνηνή; born c. 1145) was a member of the Byzantine imperial Komnenos family who became queen consort of the crusader Kingdom of Jerusalem.

In 1158, Emperor Manuel I Komnenos arranged for Theodora, his 12-year-old niece, to marry King Baldwin III of Jerusalem as part of an alliance of the two Christian states requested by Baldwin's advisors. Although they were happy together, Theodora wielded no power as Baldwin's wife, and was widowed in 1163. She retired to Acre, the city she was to hold for life as dower.

In 1168, Theodora started a relationship with her kinsman Andronikos Komnenos and soon eloped with him, infuriating Manuel. They wandered through the Muslim-ruled Levant and had two children together, Alexios and Eirene. After some time spent in Georgia, they moved to Anatolia, where Theodora and her children were captured and brought to Manuel. Andronikos and Manuel reconciled, and Theodora spent the rest of her life with Andronikos in Paphlagonia. She presumably died before 1182, when he became emperor.

== Imperial princess ==
Theodora was a member of the Komnenos dynasty of the Byzantine Empire. Her father, the sebastokrator Isaac, was the eldest surviving son of Emperor John II Komnenos. Her mother, Eirene Synadene, was Isaac's second wife. Upon John's death in 1143, Theodora's uncle Manuel I Komnenos seized the imperial throne.

In 1157, envoys from the Kingdom of Jerusalem arrived in Constantinople, the Byzantine capital, to request a marital alliance with Manuel. The kingdom was a crusader state, carved out by the Catholic Franks from the Muslim states in the Levant. It was in dire need of money and military assistance against the Muslim ruler Nur al-Din Zengi, and so when its high court debated the marriage of their young king, Baldwin III, a decision was reached to seek a Byzantine bride.

The negotiations over Baldwin's Byzantine marriage were prolonged by the Norman threat to the empire's western territories. The 12-year-old Theodora was finally selected as bride. She left Constantinople in the late summer of 1158. The Franks were fully satisfied: Theodora set out with a "colossal dowry of 100,000 hyperpyra, with a wardrobe worth a further 14,000, and another 10,000 for the costs of the royal wedding. Theodora's exceptional beauty was, according to the historian Bernard Hamilton, an "uncovenanted bonus". The conditions imposed by the emperor were that Baldwin should grant Acre, the greatest city of the kingdom, to Theodora as her dower and that Baldwin should work to secure Byzantine overlordship of the Principality of Antioch.

== Queen consort ==
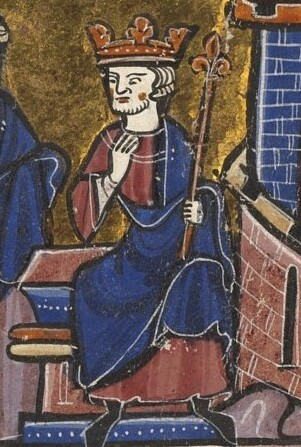
The rakish king allegedly changed his ways upon marrying Theodora.

Theodora landed at Tyre, the kingdom's port city, in September 1158. She was promptly taken to Jerusalem and crowned and anointed by Aimery of Limoges, the exiled Latin patriarch of Antioch, because the Latin patriarch of Jerusalem, Amalric of Nesle, had not yet been consecrated. Contrary to the Western practice, Theodora was first crowned and anointed and then married; her marriage to Baldwin was celebrated, also by the Antiochene patriarch, a few days after her coronation. Hamilton surmises that Theodora and Baldwin were happy together: the king, whose earlier lechery scandalized his subjects, became "a reformed character" after the marriage.

Despite being the crucial figure in the Franko-Byzantine alliance, Theodora did not publicly exercise any power as the queen of Jerusalem. Hamilton suggests that both Baldwin and his younger brother, Amalric, were mindful of the power once wielded by their mother, Queen Melisende, whom Baldwin had deposed in 1152. Baldwin associated Theodora in only two acts: one involving Acre, her dower-fief, and the other concerning a major land exchange with his vassal Philip of Milly, the importance of which required that it be witnessed by the entire royal family. The young queen did, however, have complete freedom in managing her own land and she possessed her own seal. The historian Deborah Gerish considers it "highly likely" that Theodora's Greek ethnicity and Eastern Orthodoxy were to her disadvantage; although Hans Eberhard Mayer has suggested that she may have converted to Roman Catholicism.

== Queen dowager ==
Perhaps due to her youth, Theodora and Baldwin had no children. She was aged only 17 when he died, on 10 February 1163. The crown passed to his brother, Amalric. Theodora retired to Acre. She became Jerusalem's first queen dowager and remained the only queen for some time. She could not remarry without her brother-in-law's consent, and it was in his interest that she remain a widow, so that Acre could escheat back to the crown upon her death. Hamilton surmises that Theodora's life as a foreigner amongst the Frankish nobility must have been dull, and the queenly precedence she enjoyed lapsed when Amalric married her kinswoman Maria Komnene in 1167.

States of the Levant in 1165

Theodora's kinsman Andronikos Komnenos, first cousin of Emperor Manuel, arrived to the kingdom in the winter of 1166-7. Andronikos, then in his late forties, was an adventurer with a history of political and amorous scandals. Manuel had appointed him governor of Cilicia but the duties bored him, and he went to Antioch, where he seduced Philippa, who was a member of the Antiochene ruling family and the emperor's sister-in-law. Scandal broke out, and Andronikos left with the revenues of Cilicia and Cyprus. He arrived in Jerusalem when the king was on campaign in Egypt. As protocol dictated, he paid a visit to the 21-year-old dowager queen. She became attracted to him and they started a relationship. They could not marry, however, because Andronikos had a wife in Constantinople. Andronikos impressed the king on the latter's return and received the lordship of Beirut.

Archbishop William of Tyre wrote that Andronikos, behaving towards the king "like a mouse in a wallet", invited Theodora to visit him in Beirut, abducted her as she traveled, and carried her off to the court of Nur al-Din Zengi in Damascus. The Franks were left puzzled. According to the Byzantine writer Nicetas Choniates, however, Theodora's relationship with Andronikos had become known to Emperor Manuel. Hamilton presumes that the emperor was informed by one of the noblemen who had accompanied the new queen, Maria, to Jerusalem. Concerned that the illicit relationship would put his meticulously crafted policy at risk and wishing to demonstrate to the Franks that he took the insult of their royal house seriously, Manuel sent orders to his agents in the kingdom to blind Andronikos. Theodora saw a copy of the letter and informed Andronikos, who then persuaded her to elope with him. The Franks do not appear to have been bothered; the Byzantine alliance continued through Maria, and Amalric was able to reattach Acre to the royal domain.

== Wanderer and exile ==
The defection of a Byzantine prince and a queen of Jerusalem delighted the Muslims and the couple were enthusiastically received throughout the Muslim world. Hamilton concludes that they lived together happily. A son, Alexios, and a daughter, Eirene, were born to the couple. They traveled from court to court for several years until they were received by King George III of Georgia and granted estates in Kakhetia.

Theodora and Andronikos eventually settled in northeastern Anatolia, just beyond the Byzantine frontier. They lived there in peace until imperial officials captured Theodora and her children and brought them to Constantinople. Andronikos returned to Constantinople in 1180 and theatrically pleaded for forgiveness from Manuel with a chain around his neck, begging that Theodora and the children be returned. The cousins then reconciled. Manuel sent Andronikos to govern Paphlagonia, where he lived with Theodora in a castle on the Black Sea coast. The arrangement was, essentially, an internal exile.

Theodora's ultimate fate is not known. She likely died before Andronikos made himself emperor in 1182. The historian John Julius Norwich has described Theodora as the love of Andronikos's life.

Royal titles
Vacant Title last held by Morphia of Melitene	Queen consort of Jerusalem; 1158–1162	Vacant Title next held by Maria Komnene
