= Legion of White Volunteers =

- Legión de Voluntarios Blancos
- Active: 1937-July 1939
- Country: Russia
- Allegiance: Nationalist Spain
- Type: Foreign volunteer
- Size: 72-180 men
- Part of: Requetés
- Engagements: Spanish Civil War: War in the North; Battle of Belchite; Aragon Offensive

Commanders
- Notable commanders: Vasili Oréjov; Anton Fok †

The Legion of White Volunteers was a group of anti-communist Russians who fought on the side of the Nationalist faction during the Spanish Civil War. The group's name came from the term "White émigré" which applies to Russians who had fled the Soviet Union after the Russian Civil War. Unlike other foreign volunteer units on the nationalist side such as the Joan of Arc Battalion and the Irish Brigade, the Legion of White Volunteers was not a separate unit and was attached to the Requetés.

== History ==
At the end of 1936, a group of 58 veterans of Lavr Kornilov's Shock Regiment crossed the Franco-Spanish border to join the Nationalists. In 1937 Nikolai Shinkarenko, a former White Army officer of Ukrainian descent, and Anton Fok, another former Imperial Russian general, met with Franco in order to discuss the creation of a separate Russian military unit within the Nationalist Army. Despite pressure from Russian and Ukrainian volunteers, Franco did not agree to create a separate unit but did give Shinkarenko a position within the Legion. While the nationalists initially attempted to dismiss Fok due to his age (Fok was 57 years old at the time) and send him back to France, Fok responded by snatched a gun from a nearby guard and performed a series of complex military stunts with it. This impressed the nationalists enough to sign a contract with him and place him in charge of the unit. Initially, nationalist high commanded wanted to place the legion under the subordination of the French speaking Joan of Arc Battalion. This was objected to by both Shinkarenko and Fok who viewed the French nation as "godless". Later they both agreed to join the Carlists, who allowed them to parade under the tsar's flag and wear tricolor monarchist stripes on their sleeves. Shinkarenko would go on to fight in the War in the North where he was wounded in the head on 3 April 1937. Later he participated in the Aragon Offensive.

Carlist spies in Paris had recruited a sizable unit of Russians in France. Under the command of former Imperial Russian General Anton Fok, the Russian emigres fought alongside the Requetés. Some Russian volunteers hoped that a victory against the communists in Spain would extend to a victory against the communists in the Soviet Union. Fok himself was later killed in action during the Battle of Belchite.

At Franco's victory parade on 3 May 1939, Russian volunteers marched in a separate column under the flag of the Russian Empire.

In July 1939, three months after the end of the Spanish Civil War, all Russian were officially demobilized. Those who remained in Spain received Spanish citizenship and were allowed to join the Spanish Legion as officers.
