= Sylwester Czetwertyński =

Orthodox bishop in the Polish–Lithuanian Commonwealth

- Born: Stefan Chetvertinsky; 17th century
- Died: February 14, 1728; Mogilev
- Years active: 1707–1728
- Religion: Eastern Orthodoxy
- Church: Russian Orthodox Church
- Title: Bishop of Mogilev, Mstsislaw and Orsha

Sylvester, born Stefan Chetvertinsky (died 14 February 1728), was an Orthodox bishop in the Polish–Lithuanian Commonwealth.

He came from the princely Chetvertinsky family. In 1702, he became the superior of the Transfiguration Monastery in Stara Czetwertnia. In 1707, thanks to the intervention of Tsar Peter the Great, he assumed the management of the Eparchy of Mogilev and Mstsislaw (in Belarus). He received the royal privilege for the bishopric six years later, also under the pressure of Russian diplomacy. A year after assuming office, in 1708, he found himself in sharp conflict with the Metropolitan of Kyiv, Joasaph, as he sought to bring the stauropegial monasteries in the Grand Duchy of Lithuania under his control and enforce proper discipline. In particular, he focused on the Holy Trinity Monastery in Slutsk and the Kuteinski Monastery in Orsha. The prolonged dispute over control of the monasteries ended with a status quo being maintained.

During his time as bishop of Belarus, Sylvester Chetvertinsky defended the property rights of the Orthodox Church, demanded the Polish king respect the rights of Orthodox people, prevent forced conversions to Catholicism, and stop the confiscation of Orthodox religious buildings. Due to the unfriendly policies of Augustus II the Strong, he maintained regular correspondence with Tsar Peter the Great, particularly after 1721. In 1725, he stated in a letter that without Russian support, he would be unable to continue leading the eparchy. However, Russian interventions were unsuccessful; Sylvester died in 1728, shortly after sending another letter to Russia asking for assistance. After his death, Augustus II the Strong prevented the installation of a new bishop of Belarus, and the bishopric remained vacant until 1737.

== Biography ==
=== Youth and early activity ===
Sylvester (born Stefan Chetvertinsky) came from the princely Chetvertinsky family. His grandfather, Grzegorz Chetvertinsky, held the position of chamberlain of Luck. His father, Wacław Chetvertinsky, was also the chamberlain of Luck and the huntsman of Volhynia from 1662, later becoming the standard-bearer of Zhytomyr and starosta of Zyzyn and Danichiv from 1666. His mother, Ludwika (née Wojna-Orańska), was the daughter of a vice-judge of Chernihiv. The secular name of the future bishop was Stefan; F. Titow lists the secular name as Sergiusz.

At home, he received a solid education. He also frequently accompanied his father to meetings of the Orthodox nobility opposed to the union. Although much of the Chetvertinsky family converted to Catholicism, Stefan Chetvertinsky retained the Orthodox faith. Following the example of his paternal cousin Grzegorz, after taking monastic vows, he entered the Transfiguration Monastery in Stara Czetwertnia. There, he took eternal monastic vows under the name Sylvester and became the superior of the community in 1702. His contemporaries described him as "a man of great learning and pastoral zeal". Numerous meetings with the Orthodox nobility allowed him to establish personal contacts with some of its most influential representatives.

=== Bishop of Mogilev, Mstsislaw and Orsha ===
==== 1707–1713 ====
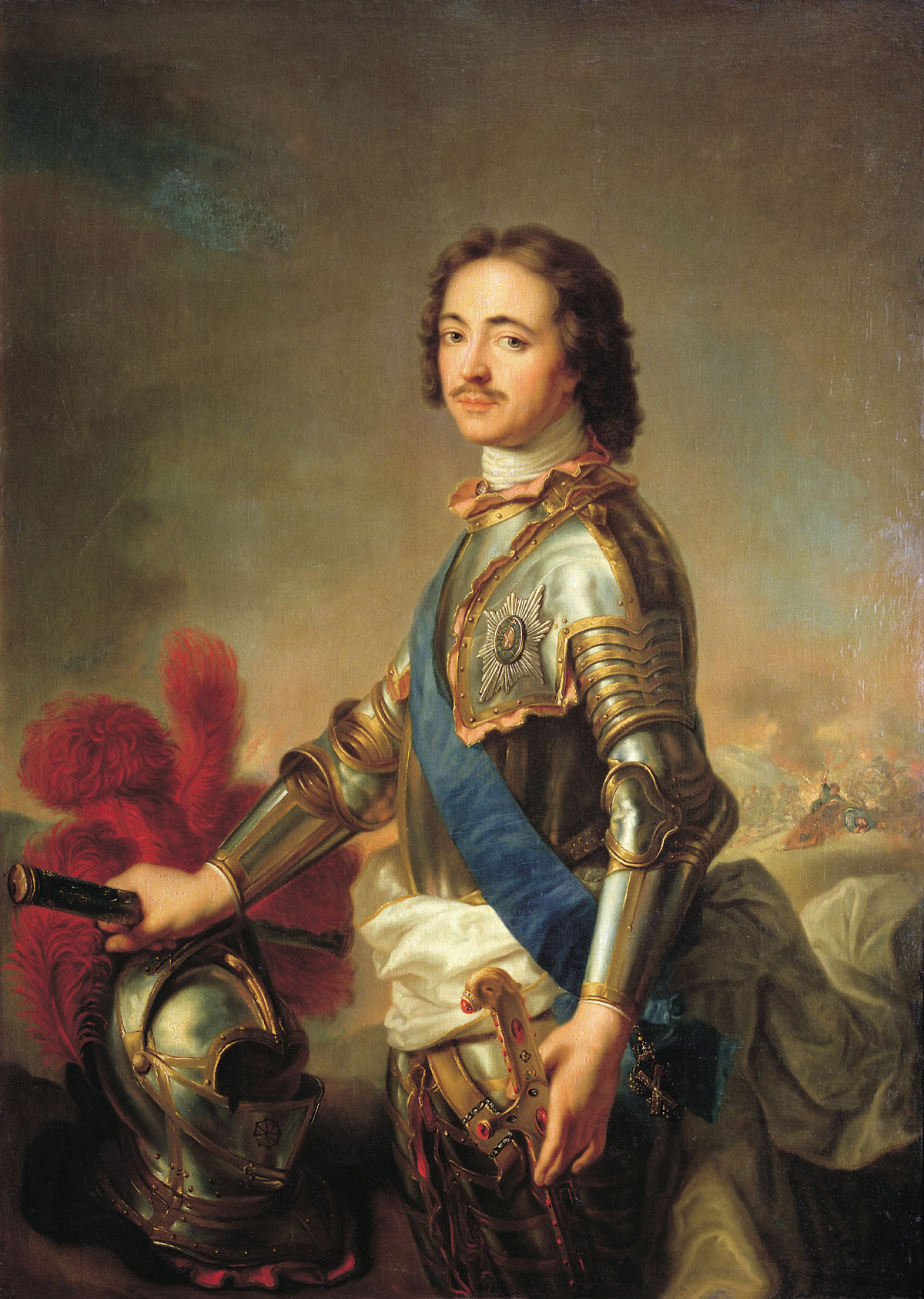
Tsar Peter the Great, in defiance of the law of the Polish-Lithuanian Commonwealth, enabled Bishop Sylvester to take the Belarusian episcopal throne

Sylvester Chetvertinsky was appointed bishop of Mogilev, Mstsislaw and Orsha in 1705, a year after the death of the previous bishop, Serapion Polchowski. According to another source, his appointment happened as early as 1704. His selection was influenced not only by his abilities but also by his connections with the Metropolitan of Kyiv, Gedeon, and his prestigious lineage. Sylvester was also an accomplished preacher. His episcopal consecration as archimandrite took place in Kyiv in 1707, with Metropolitan Warlaam of Kyiv as the main consecrator. Bishop Sylvester arrived at his residence in Mogilev in August of the same year, at a time when the city was occupied by Russian troops. His appointment was made with clear support from Tsar Peter the Great, marking a Russian intervention in the religious affairs of the Commonwealth. The illegal introduction of an Orthodox bishop into Mogilev by the tsar was part of Peter the Great's anti-Uniate actions following his entry into the Commonwealth, which also included hindering religious practices of the Uniate population, expelling Uniate Metropolitan Lev Zalenskyj, and the murder of Basilian monks in Polotsk.

Sylvester's enthronement was not officially sanctioned with the appropriate royal privilege, meaning the Commonwealth authorities did not recognize him as a legally operating bishop. Bishop Sylvester stayed in Mogilev only until March 1708, when he left for his family estate in Stara Czetwertnia, as he considered it dangerous to remain in Mogilev due to the ongoing Great Northern War. The war almost entirely prevented him from managing his diocese.

In October 1708, Bishop Sylvester filed a complaint with the municipal records of Mogilev against the Russian troops, accusing them of plundering the city. As a member of a delegation of Mogilev citizens, he traveled to Tsar Peter the Great's temporary headquarters in Voronezh that same year. The delegation asked the tsar for permission to rebuild the city and protect it from further destruction. Sylvester's participation in the mission contributed to Peter the Great's mistrust of the bishop, accusing him of disloyalty to Russia. On the other hand, the Belarusian bishop was unwilling to support the tsarist policies towards the Kyiv metropolis and was critical of many actions of the tsarist administration.

==== Competency disputes with the Metropolitan of Kyiv ====
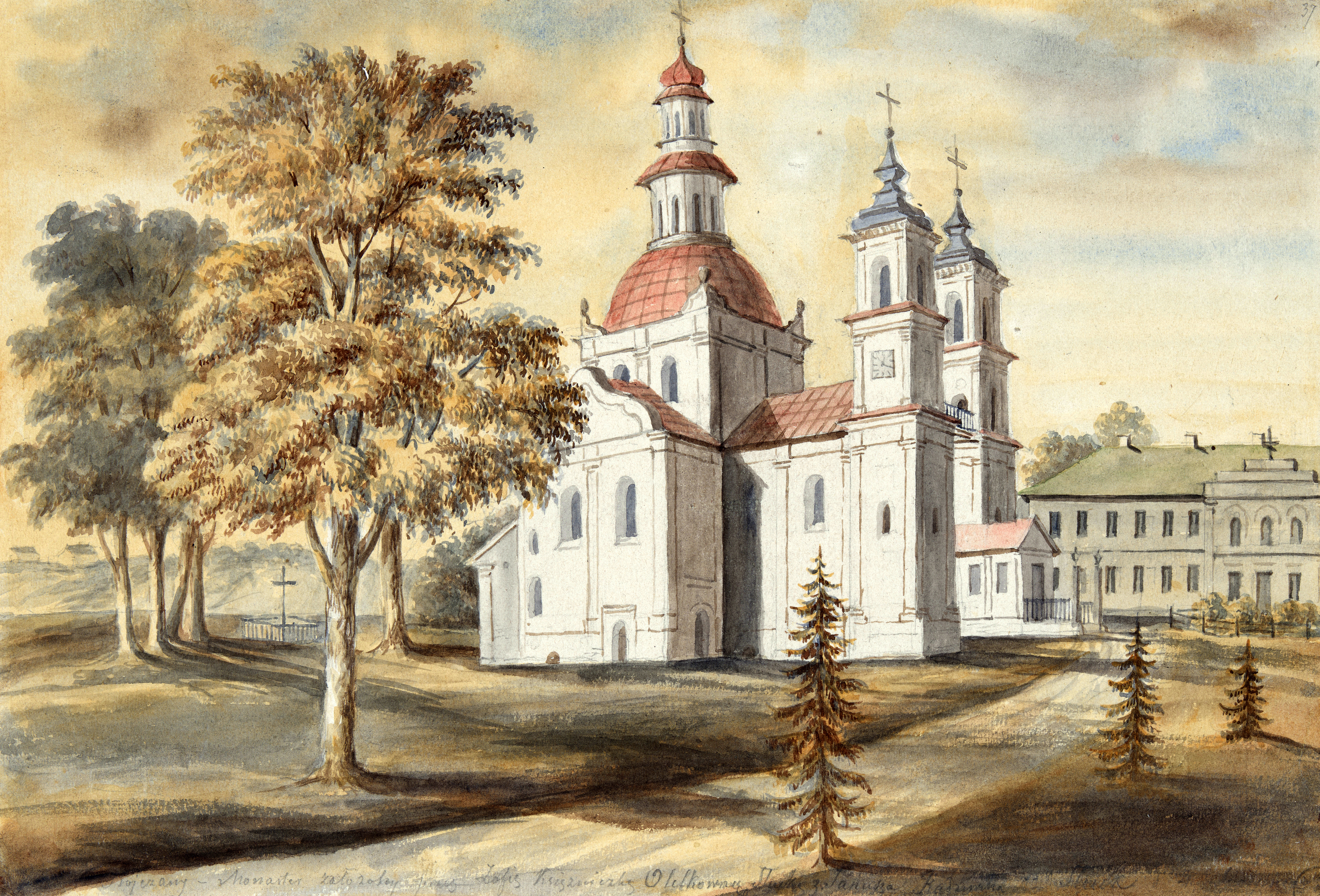
Trinity Monastery in Slutsk. Bishop Sylvester spent many years of his tenure in a dispute with the Metropolitan of Kyiv over control of the monastery

When Sylvester Chetvertinsky received his episcopal consecration, he was appointed bishop of Mogilev, Mstsislaw and Orsha. He also promised not to extend his jurisdiction beyond the boundaries of his diocese. This was especially important given that his predecessor, Bishop Serapion, held the title of Exarch of the Ecumenical Patriarch of Constantinople in the Commonwealth, as well as the Vicar of the Metropolis of Kyiv. As a result, he had control over Orthodox monasteries in the Commonwealth that, by the will of their founders, were under the authority of the Metropolitan of Kyiv, despite the fact that the residence of the latter was outside the country. Metropolitan Warlaam of Kyiv demanded this commitment, particularly regarding the canonical status of the former Diocese of Turov. The Orthodox structures in this area, remnants of the creation of the Uniate Diocese of Turov in 1596, were under the vicar of the Metropolitan of Kyiv, usually the superior of the Trinity Monastery in Slutsk or the Slutsk and Kopyl protopope. Despite this, Bishop Sylvester unilaterally added to his title the position of Vicar of the Metropolitan in the Grand Duchy of Lithuania, which reflected his private ambitions rather than his actual jurisdiction.

Practically immediately after taking office, Bishop Sylvester found himself in conflict with the Trinity Monastery in Slutsk. Taking advantage of a division within the community – some of its members were leaning towards joining the jurisdiction of the Belarusian bishop – he declared the monastery and all its affiliated institutions free from the authority of the Metropolitan of Kyiv and placed them under his own control. He did this despite the fact that the monastery's superior, Archimandrite Joasaph, and most of the monks wanted to maintain the status quo. In response to the bishop's actions, in January 1708, the Brotherhood of the Transfiguration of the Lord in Slutsk sent a protest to Metropolitan Joasaph of Kyiv. They accused the bishop of not only disregarding the privileges of the monastery but also of beating monks, looting the archimandrite's palace, and taking valuable documents and items from the monastery.

In 1709, the metropolitan condemned the Belarusian bishop's actions in a letter, prohibited him from using the title of vicar, and suspended all clergy ordained or rewarded by him. He also announced that Sylvester would be tried by a synod of bishops to be held in Kyiv. Despite this, Bishop Sylvester not only retained control over the Trinity Monastery in Slutsk and continued to appropriate its income, but also took control of the Kuteinski Monastery near Orsha. In January 1710, the monastery's superior, together with the heads of six smaller monasteries, filed a complaint against Sylvester with Tsar Peter the Great.

On 11 February 1710, Tsar Peter the Great sent a commissioner to the Kuteinski Monastery, officially to investigate the merits of the complaint against the bishop. The true intention of the Russian ruler was to gather evidence of persecution by Catholics and Commonwealth authorities, but the monastery presented him with the already known complaint against Bishop Sylvester. Meanwhile, the locum tenens of the Moscow Patriarchate, Metropolitan Stefan Yavorsky, confirmed in a letter dated 3 March 1710 the Metropolitan of Kyiv's rights to govern the stauropigial monasteries and prohibited the Belarusian bishop from interfering with their activities.

Until 1715, Bishop Sylvester resided permanently in Stara Czetwertnia. He returned to Mogilev only after the cessation of hostilities.

==== Conflicts over church property ====
===== Case of the monastery in Stara Czetwertnia and the estate in Pechersk =====
In 1711, Jan Bogusław Horain, who had purchased Stara Czetwertnia that same year from Bishop Sylvester's brother, Gabriel Chetvertinsky, transferred the Elevation of the Holy Cross nunnery in Stara Czetwertnia – originally founded by the Chetvertinsky family – to Uniate nuns. In response, Archimandrite Sylvester organized an armed raid on the convent. In retaliation, Horain seized the men's monastery operating in the same town. Over the next several years, the bishop, together with his brother, was involved in a legal dispute over the properties of both monasteries. He ceased pursuing the matter only in 1715, when he permanently relocated to Mogilev.

At the same time, Sylvester was also engaged in a legal battle with the Carmelite order over the Pechersk estate, which housed the residence of the Belarusian bishop. The Carmelites had unlawfully seized part of the estate in 1703.

==== 1713–1724: Continuation of the conflict with the Metropolitan of Kyiv ====
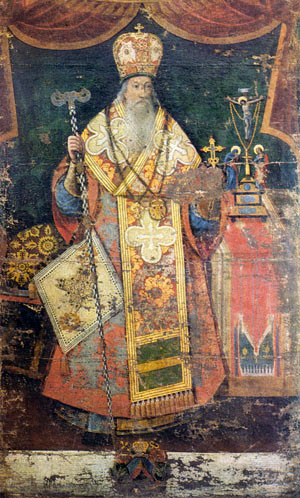
Metropolitan Joasaph Krokowski refused to transfer stauropegial monasteries in the Grand Duchy of Lithuania under the jurisdiction of the Belarusian bishop, leading to their years-long conflict

In 1713, Augustus II the Strong issued a privilege granting Sylvester Chetvertinsky the right to manage the Belarusian eparchy as well as the stauropegial institutions located within it. This decision was made under strong pressure from Russian diplomacy, and the extension of the bishop's authority aimed to minimize contact between Orthodox clergy in the Polish–Lithuanian Commonwealth and the metropolitan residing in Russia. Historian Antoni Mironowicz suggests that Augustus II the Strong deliberately sought to further antagonize both hierarchs, while part of the Orthodox clergy and nobility in the Commonwealth supported this arrangement. Disregarding the privilege's provisions, Metropolitan Joasaph once again forbade the Belarusian bishop from styling himself as his deputy in the Grand Duchy of Lithuania. Instead, he reaffirmed the rights of the Slutsk archimandrite to oversee all Orthodox structures in Slutsk and Kopyl.

The royal privilege intensified the jurisdictional dispute between the Metropolitan of Kyiv and the Belarusian bishop. This, combined with ongoing warfare, delayed Sylvester's return to Mogilev until 1715. In 1716, he moved to the Holy Trinity Monastery in Slutsk, where he exploited a conflict between the monastery and the supporting Orthodox brotherhood to seize its entire annual income. He also expelled its superior and deputy, Archimandrites Joasaph and Theodosius. Sylvester then appointed a loyal superior and, in January 1717, unlawfully imprisoned the monk Dymitr upon his return from Kyiv, refusing to release him even after receiving a royal order. In July 1716, Sylvester issued a letter to the faithful, declaring himself the legitimate overseer of all parishes and monasteries in the Grand Duchy of Lithuania based on the royal privilege. However, the clergy of Slutsk and the superiors of local monasteries rejected his authority. He gained support only from Hegumen Gedeon, the superior of Saints Peter and Paul Monastery in Minsk, and the head of Saint John the Theologian Monastery in Hrozawa.

On 27 July 1717, Metropolitan Joasaph excommunicated all priests who had accepted offices from the Belarusian bishop. Sylvester responded by announcing the excommunication's annulment. This prompted the metropolitan to seek intervention from the Russian envoy in Warsaw, while the Archimandrite of Slutsk, Joasaph, turned to the owner of the Slutsk estates, Palatine of the Rhine Charles Philip. Their intervention, along with a royal decree revoking Sylvester's authority over the Slutsk monastery, forced the bishop to finally abandon his claims to the archimandry. However, until his death, Sylvester maintained that his authority over the monastery had been unlawfully stripped. The Orthodox clergy of Slutsk continued to oppose him and, as late as 1720, accused him of destroying the Transfiguration Monastery in Slutsk.

A similarly fierce dispute arose between Bishop Sylvester and Kuteinski Monastery. In 1723, upon his arrival at the monastery, the monks imprisoned him within its grounds. In response, in 1724, the bishop excommunicated eight clerics associated with the monastery, including its superior. The Russian resident in Mogilev reported that the bishop was in the right, claiming that Sylvester had merely attempted to enforce proper discipline in the monasteries – particularly by curbing drunkenness among monks – rather than solely seeking to change their jurisdiction. These measures, rather than jurisdictional disputes, allegedly provoked resistance from the monastic communities. Despite this defense, which was relayed to Tsar Peter the Great, the Metropolitan of Kyiv retained oversight of the contested monasteries.

The jurisdictional conflict between the Belarusian bishop and the Metropolitan of Kyiv, as well as its violent nature, had a detrimental effect on the Orthodox faithful in the Commonwealth. It contributed to their decline in both numbers and influence.

==== Organizational changes in the eparchy. Relations with the Mogilev brotherhood ====
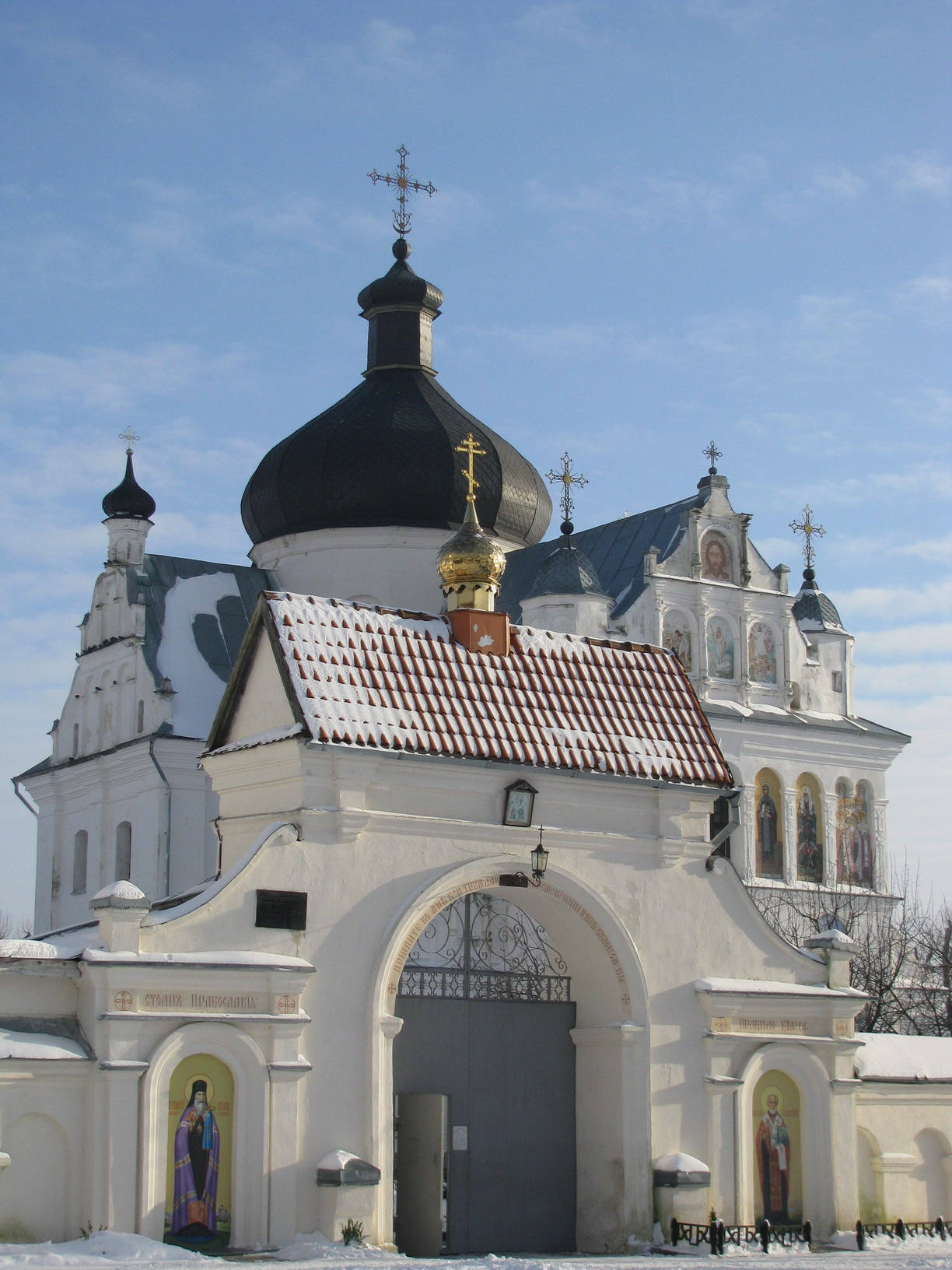
St. Nicholas Monastery Complex in Mogilev was transformed by Bishop Sylvester from a women's to a men's monastery

In 1719, the bishop reorganized the women's monasteries in the eparchy, closing the St. Nicholas Monastery Complex in Mogilev and directing the last remaining sisters to monasteries in Barkolabovo and Shklow. He converted the Monastery of St. Nicholas into a men's monastery.

After arriving in Mogilev in 1715, the bishop established close cooperation with the Orthodox Mogilev brotherhood. Together, they decided to rebuild the cathedral, which had been destroyed during the Great Northern War. However, Archdeacon Kalikst Zaleński-Ołowiaszko, whom the hierarch entrusted with managing the fundraising effort, embezzled the collected funds. The dispute over the misappropriation of money was not resolved during Bishop Sylvester's lifetime.

Relations between the bishop and the brotherhood significantly deteriorated around 1725, when they failed to reach an agreement on the selection of a new superior for the Monastery of the Epiphany in Mogilev, which was under the brotherhood's care. Bishop Sylvester did not agree to Hegumen Klemens Pigarewicz assuming the position and sought to completely strip the brotherhood of any influence over the monastery's affairs. The members of the brotherhood filed a complaint against the bishop to the king, accusing him of violating the organization's rights, which were based on previously granted privileges. Augustus II supported the brotherhood, ordering the bishop to cease interfering in the monastery's affairs and to pay 2,000 Lithuanian kopecks to the royal treasury and the brotherhood. Bishop Sylvester, likely due to his advanced age and illness, did not continue the dispute and in the following years maintained proper relations with the brotherhood. This is evidenced by his participation in processions and public ceremonies organized by the organization.

==== Russian support for the Belarusian eparchy ====
In 1718, the superiors of monasteries in the Grand Duchy of Lithuania submitted a complaint to Tsar Peter the Great, claiming that their communities were being persecuted by state authorities. They argued that without Russian intervention with the Polish king, Orthodoxy in the Polish–Lithuanian Commonwealth would be completely eradicated. Bishop Sylvester supported the petition.

Two years later, on 1 April 1720, the hierarch himself wrote a memorandum to the tsar, requesting comprehensive assistance for the last remaining Orthodox eparchy in the Commonwealth. He asked Russian diplomacy to obtain guarantees from the king that the Belarusian eparchy would not be abolished, that conversions from Catholicism to Orthodoxy would be allowed, that those disrupting Orthodox services would be punished, that Orthodox townspeople would be permitted to hold municipal offices, that Orthodox bishops would be admitted to the Senate, and that 75 churches taken by the Uniates after 1700 would be returned. Taking advantage of the weakened international position of the Commonwealth, the tsar forced the king on 28 July of the same year to issue a privilege confirming not only Sylvester Chetvertinsky's rights to the Belarusian bishopric but also all previous privileges and rights granted to the Orthodox population. However, the privilege did not guarantee full religious freedoms in practice, nor did it implement the Belarusian bishop's demands outlined in his correspondence with the tsar.

Additionally, the privilege's wording created potential jurisdictional disputes between the Belarusian bishop and the Metropolitan of Kyiv. As in a similar document from 1713, the king referred to the ordinary of the Belarusian eparchy as the superior of all Orthodox churches and monasteries in the Grand Duchy of Lithuania, including stauropegial ones. The Belarusian bishop's unfulfilled demands became the subject of further Russian diplomatic interventions, particularly after the Synod of Zamość, which led to the rapid expansion of the Uniate Church at the expense of Orthodoxy. On the tsar's orders, the Russian ambassador in Warsaw personally intervened with the king on behalf of the Orthodox, while his interpreter traveled to Belarusian and Lithuanian lands to collect complaints about persecution by Catholics and supporting evidence.

In 1721, an attempt on Bishop Sylvester's life was made by Catholics in the village of Dubrowna when he traveled there to consecrate a church. Another assassination attempt, again unsuccessful, was carried out later that year by the nobleman Piotr Swiacki, who attacked Sylvester on the road near Mogilev. In 1722, under further pressure from the tsar, with whom the Belarusian bishop maintained constant correspondence, Augustus II once again confirmed the legality of Sylvester's position.

The following year, the Sejm established a commission to investigate complaints from Orthodox communities regarding the forced seizure of churches. However, its decisions were never implemented. Catholic clergy continued to attack Orthodox institutions in the Belarusian eparchy. In 1724, Latin clergy unlawfully took control of a Dnieper river crossing and an estate in Moszonki that belonged to the Orthodox bishopric. Bishop Sylvester reported these events to the tsar, who again appealed to Augustus II to pass legislation protecting the rights of religious dissidents at the next Sejm. Additionally, he sent his commissioner, Ignatiy Rudakovsky, to Mogilev. Rudakovsky highly praised Bishop Sylvester's work, stating that without him, Orthodoxy in the Commonwealth would cease to exist.

In June 1725, the hierarch once again wrote to the tsar, reporting forced conversions of Orthodox believers to the Uniate Church and the unlawful imprisonment of two of his clergy. He stated that without Russian support, he would be unable to continue fulfilling his duties. He frequently contacted the king to defend the Belarusian eparchy's property and represented his eparchy in disputes over church estates seized by Catholics of both rites. In 1726, he defended Orthodox rights to the cathedral in Mogilev against the plans of Grand Treasurer of the Crown Franciszek Maksymilian Ossoliński, who argued to the Russian ambassador that the building had been constructed by the Uniates and sought to remove Bishop Sylvester from Mogilev.

Despite his reliance on Russian assistance, the hierarch sought to maintain the traditional dependence of the Orthodox Church structures in the Commonwealth on the Patriarchate of Constantinople. He also aimed to avoid acting solely in Russian interests, mindful of potential Polish government reactions.

=== After the death of Peter the Great ===
The successors of Tsar Peter the Great, who died in early 1725, showed little interest in the situation of Orthodox believers in the Polish–Lithuanian Commonwealth and lacked detailed knowledge of the issue. In April 1725, at the request of the Polish king, Russian commissioner Ignatiy Rudakovsky left Mogilev. Bishop Sylvester was misled about the nature of this departure – even the Russian side assured him that Rudakovsky's departure (despite his active support of Sylvester's efforts) was only temporary.

Just two months later, Sylvester Chetvertinsky wrote to the commissioner, requesting that a Russian representative be sent to Mogilev. He reported new acts of hostility from Catholics and attempts to forcibly seize Orthodox churches in Mogilev, including the cathedral, as well as in Nowy Bychów, Tajmanów, and Szkłów. He received no response. Nevertheless, in August 1726, he once again appealed for help – this time directly to Empress Catherine I – informing her of the Uniates' attempts to take over Orthodox parishes in Mstsislaw and of an assassination attempt against him. This time, his plea prompted an intervention by the Russian envoy, General Jaguszyński. However, the intervention proved ineffective, as Polish religious policy was becoming increasingly unfavorable toward Orthodoxy. Uniate Metropolitan Athanasius Szeptycki openly called for the complete eradication of the Orthodox Church in the country.

Facing the lack of a Russian diplomatic response and the worsening situation of Orthodox believers in the Commonwealth, Sylvester Chetvertinsky made another desperate appeal. On 3 February 1728, he sent a letter to Tsar Peter II, detailing numerous violations of Orthodox rights and warning that the absence of Russian intervention would lead to the destruction of the Belarusian eparchy and the forced conversion of its faithful to Catholicism. 11 days after sending the letter, Bishop Sylvester passed away. King Augustus II refused to allow his successor, Bishop Arsenius, who had been appointed by the Most Holy Synod, to take up the Belarusian bishopric. He also blocked the appointment of Joseph Wołczański, who had been chosen by the local nobility and clergy. The bishopric remained vacant until 1737, when it was finally filled under the reign of Augustus III.

== Bibliography ==
- Ćwikła, L. (2006). Polityka władz państwowych wobec Kościoła prawosławnego i ludności prawosławnej w Królestwie Polskim, Wielkim Księstwie Litewskim oraz Rzeczypospolitej Obojga Narodów w latach 1344–1795 [The Policy of the State Authorities Toward the Orthodox Church and Orthodox Population in the Kingdom of Poland, the Grand Duchy of Lithuania, and the Polish–Lithuanian Commonwealth from 1344 to 1795] (in Polish). Lublin: Wydawnictwo Katolickiego Uniwersytetu Lubelskiego. ISBN 83-7363-350-2.
- Mironowicz, A. (2008). Diecezja białoruska w XVII i XVIII wieku [The Belarusian Diocese in the 17th and 18th Centuries] (in Polish). Białystok: Wydawnictwo Uniwersytetu w Białymstoku. ISBN 978-83-7431-150-2.
