= Battalions of Death =

- Батальо́ны сме́рти
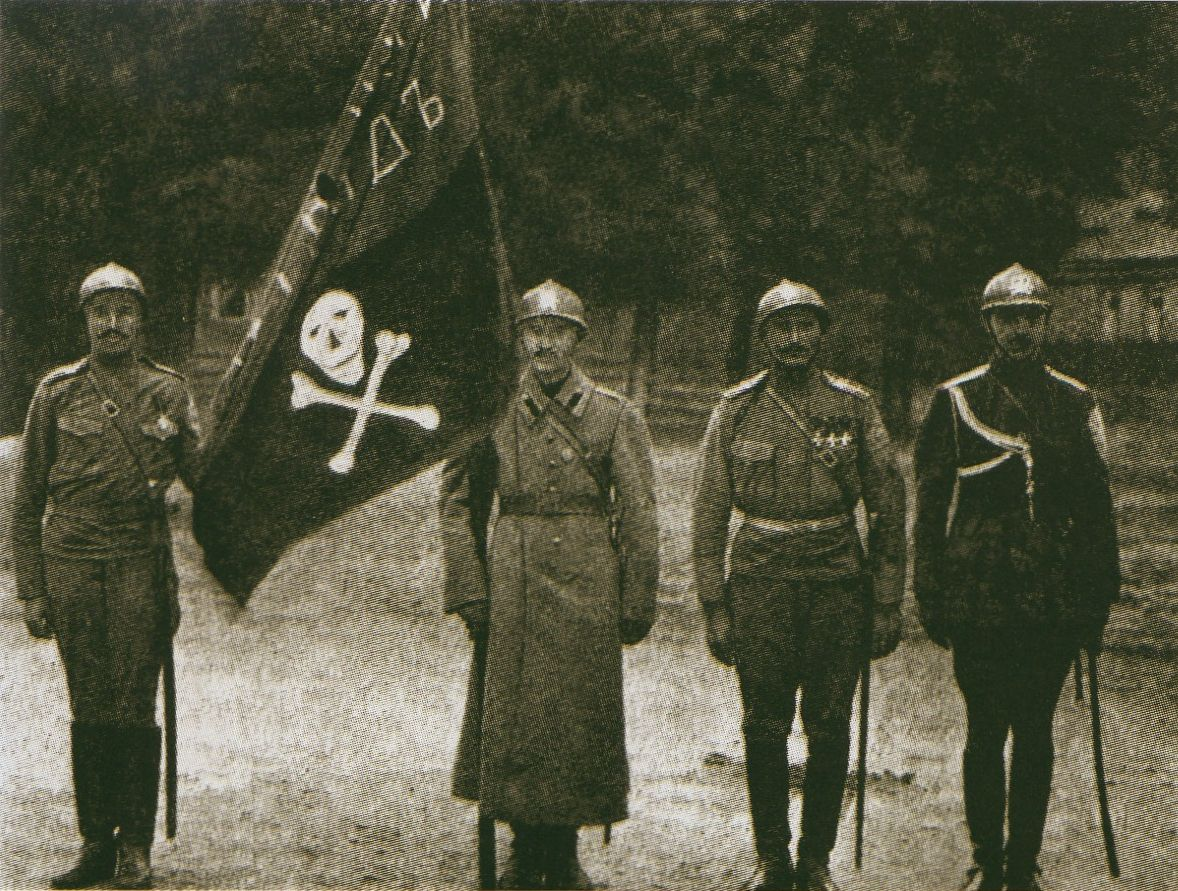
- Shock troops of the Russian Eighth Army. They later formed the Kornilov Shock Regiment.
- Active: 1916–1917
- Country: Russian Empire; Russian Republic
- Branch: Imperial Russian Army; Russian Army (from 1917)
- Type: Shock troops
- Size: 600,000
- Engagements: World War I

Commanders
- Notable commanders: Aleksei Brusilov; Lavr Kornilov

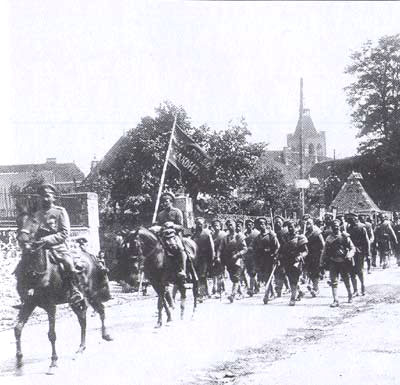
The death battalion of the 3rd Caucasus Army Corps.

The Battalions of Death (Russian: батальо́ны сме́рти), also called shock battalions (Russian: уда́рные батальо́ны), were infantry shock troops established by the Russian Imperial Army during World War I.

There were two different types of these units: the "battalions of death" were formed using many civilian volunteers recruited across Russia and given a short training in stormtrooper tactics with grenades. The "shock battalions" were created from soldiers of existing military units, in some cases with entire regiments being designated as shock units, and received additional training with grenades and machine guns. All of the shock unit members were able to wear red and black chevrons and the death's head skull insignia. The volunteers for these units mainly came from officers, sergeants, or civilians, while the ordinary soldiers were less likely to join.

== History ==
They were initially formed in 1916 during the Brusilov offensive as special forces for infiltrating enemy lines, but in the spring of 1917 they were expanded into a new volunteer infantry force for the purpose of spearheading an offensive against the Central Powers. The battalions of death were created on the initiative of General Aleksei Brusilov, the commander of the Southwestern Front who later became the Army Supreme Commander, in response to mutinies and the decline in discipline among the infantry after the February Revolution. Brusilov formally made a call on 5 June 1917 for volunteers to join "revolutionary shock battalions" in order to "show the army that all free Russian people are going with it into the struggle for freedom and a quick peace."

Recruitment for the battalions focused on the need to defend Russia and the revolution while a new government was being created. Between March and November 1917 the shock battalions grew to a strength over 600,000 soldiers. The shock detachments were recruited from front line troops as well as civilian volunteers, and they also included several all-female Women's Battalions, which had a total strength of about 6,000.

The shock battalions were credited for the initial success of the Kerensky offensive during its first few days in July 1917. In November 1917 they also defended the Stavka of the Supreme Commander, the army high command, when the Bolsheviks began taking control.

== See also ==
World War I shock troops of other nations:

- Stormtroopers (Germany)
- Arditi (Italy)
- Jagdkommandos (Austria-Hungary)

== Bibliography ==
- Clodfelter, Micheal (2008). Warfare and Armed Conflicts: A Statistical Encyclopedia of Casualty and Other Figures, 1494–2007. Jefferson: McFarland. ISBN 978-0-7864-3319-3.
- Cockfield, Jamie H. (2019). Russia's Iron General: The Life of Aleksei A. Brusilov, 1853–1926. Lanham: Lexington Books. ISBN 978-1-4985-7252-1.
- Katkov, George (1980). Russia 1917: The Kornilov Affair. London; New York: Longman. ISBN 978-0-582-49101-4.
- Reese, Roger R. (2019). The Imperial Russian Army in Peace, War, and Revolution, 1856–1917. Lawrence: University Press of Kansas. ISBN 978-0-7006-2860-5.
- Wildman, Allan (1987). The End of the Russian Imperial Army: The Road to Soviet Power and Peace. Vol. II. Princeton: Princeton University Press. ISBN 0-691-05504-1.
- Ziemke, Earl F. (2004). The Red Army, 1918–1941: From Vanguard of World Revolution to America's Ally. Taylor & Francis. ISBN 978-1-135-76918-5.
