= Stavka of the Supreme Commander =

High military command of the Russian Empire during World War I

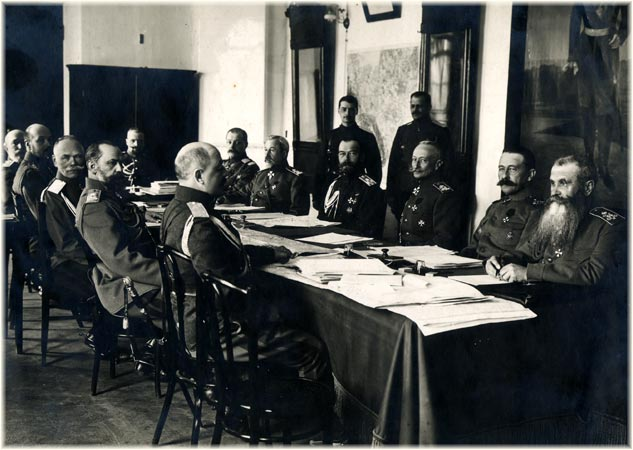
- A meeting of the Stavka in 1916.
- Active: 31 July 1914 – March 1918
- Country: Russian Empire; Russian Republic; Russian SFSR
- Role: Headquarters
- Part of: Imperial Russian Army; Russian Army (1917)
- Location: Baranovichi (1914–15); Mogilev (1915–18); Petrograd (1918)
- Engagements: World War I

The Stavka of the Supreme Commander (Russian: Ставка Верховного главнокомандующего) was the wartime supreme headquarters of the Imperial Russian Army in the field during World War I until the demobilization of the army in March 1918.

The Stavka was led by the supreme commander, Grand Duke Nicholas Nicholaevich from 1914 to 1915 and then Emperor Nicholas II until the February Revolution in 1917. Grand Duke Nicholas presided over the initial offensives in East Prussia and Galicia before the Gorlice–Tarnów offensive forced Russia to withdraw, becoming known as the Great Retreat. After this the emperor took command, and the second half of 1915 and early 1916 was a break from large-scale operations (with the exception of the Lake Naroch and Erzurum offensives) until the start of the Brusilov Offensive. While Nicholas II was the supreme commander he left military decisions to his chief of staff, Mikhail Alekseyev, who ran the Stavka.

Throughout the political upheaval of the Russian Revolution in 1917 the Stavka remained in command of millions of troops at the front line. After the emperor's abdication in March 1917, his chief of staff Alekseyev was appointed the Supreme Commander, but in May he was replaced by Aleksei Brusilov ahead of the June offensive, as he was more optimistic about working with the new "revolutionary army" of the Provisional Government. After the failure of the June offensive, in part because of troops disobeying orders, Alexander Kerensky appointed Lavr Kornilov as the head of the army to restore order. But the Stavka supported Kornilov when he attempted a military coup against the Petrograd Soviet and the Provisional Government, causing Kerensky to take the post of Supreme Commander himself. When he fled during the October Revolution, his chief of staff, Nikolay Dukhonin, assumed command.

The Russian Army was the last tsarist institution to survive the Revolution, and in late November 1917 the Bolsheviks began taking control of the command structure. Nikolai Krylenko was appointed as Supreme Commander after Dukhonin refused to recognize the Bolsheviks as the legitimate government. After Krylenko and the Bolsheviks arrived and took control of the Stavka, the high command was kept in place for several months as military technical experts because of the need for the Bolsheviks to maintain an army at the front while negotiations with Germany were ongoing. The remaining "old army" was demobilized in March 1918 with the signing of the Treaty of Brest-Litovsk and the Stavka was dissolved.

== History ==
=== 1914–1916: Imperial Army ===
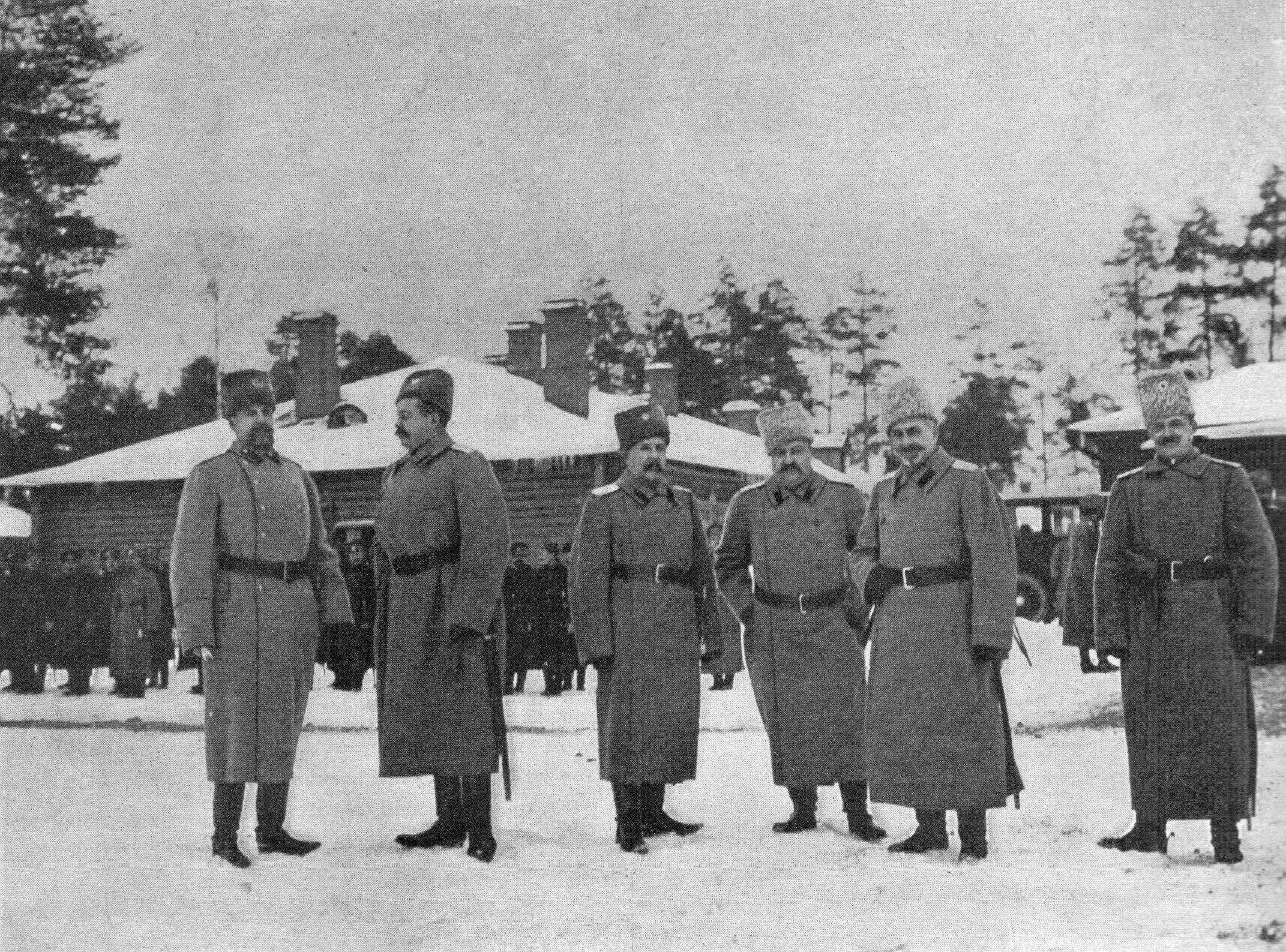
Stavka generals in 1915.

When war with Germany broke out, Emperor Nicholas II wanted to take direct command of the army at first. Prime Minister Ivan Goremykin later said that Nicholas never forgave himself for not leading the army during the Russo-Japanese War. But he was advised against it. The Emperor instead appointed his cousin, Grand Duke Nicholas Nicholaevich, as Supreme Commander of the Imperial Army on 31 July 1914. He had previously been the head of the Russian Imperial Guard. The Grand Duke accepted on the Emperor's recommendation Nikolai Yanushkevich as his chief of staff and Yuri Danilov as Quartermaster-General, and in mid-August 1914 was the first time that he met his other staff officers that would make up the Stavka. One of his first acts as Supreme Commander was giving an order for the invasion of East Prussia, as he thought that Russia's priority should be to assist the French, which would be the prelude for later advancing into Silesia and then onto Berlin. Russia's prewar planning, known as Plan 19A, called for the main concentration of forces to be against Germany's ally Austria-Hungary, but Grand Duke Nicholas believed that the priority should be for Russia to assist its ally France against Germany, and the plan also did not rule out an invasion of German territory. It was decided to attack both at once, and the Grand Duke and his staff initially expected a quick victory in the war.

On 16 August 1914 the Supreme Commander and his staff arrived from Petrograd at the Supreme Headquarters, the Stavka, in the town of Baranovichi, an important railway junction and located in the middle of the front. It was chosen as the site of the Supreme Headquarters to make it easier to communicate with armies along the front and for Grand Duke Nicholas to visit army commanders. Taking over a military railway brigade building, the Stavka had a permanent staff of 60, which assisted the Grand Duke in running an army of about 6,000,000 troops after the mobilization. The limited size of the staff and a lack of equipment made it difficult to communicate with front line troops or to direct operations. To the north of the Stavka was the Northwestern Front (Note: A front was the Russian equivalent of an army group.) along the German frontier and to the south was the Southwestern Front opposite of Austria-Hungary.

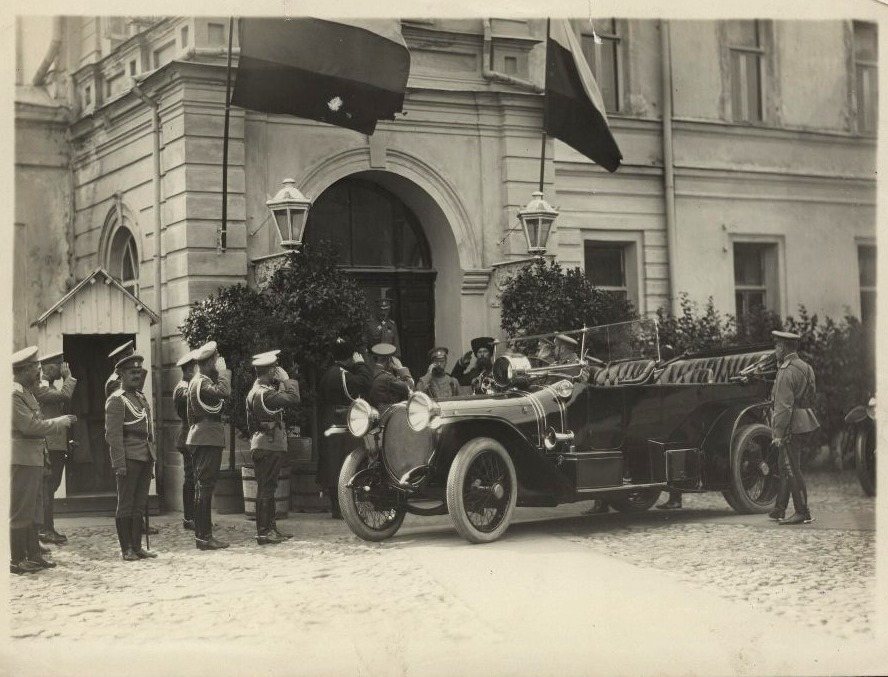
Emperor Nicholas II visiting the Stavka in 1915.

The closest associates of Grand Duke Nicholas in his role as the Supreme Commander were his chief of staff, General Yanushkevich, who was his closest confidant and controlled access to him; General Danilov, the head of operations; and the French military attaché, General de La Guiche (also spelled Laguiche), who was the liaison between the Grand Duke and General Joffre, his equivalent in the French Army. He was favored by Nicholas over the British representative, John Hanbury-Williams, and he also flew the French flag at the Stavka headquarters in addition to the Supreme Commander's standard. During his time as Supreme Commander, he never visited the troops at the front line. There were different explanations for this given by those at the Stavka: that Yanushkevich advised him against it, who was worried about making the Emperor jealous of the Grand Duke's popularity among the troops, or the Grand Duke himself simply did not want to go. In any case, this led him to grant broad authority to his subordinate front and army commanders. Many of the orders he sent out were written as suggestions rather than as strict commands. However, he kept up to date on military operations and occasionally gave orders that went against what front commanders wanted. He was still actively engaged in commanding the army.

The first offensives of 1914 were aimed at defending Russia's Polish salient, by attacking German East Prussia to its north and Austro-Hungarian Galicia to its south. The East Prussia campaign ended with a Russian defeat, with the Northwestern Front's Second Army being nearly destroyed by the Germans at the Battle of Tannenberg and the First Army withdrawing from German territory in September 1914 to avoid being encircled. In the south, there was more success, and by mid-September the Austro-Hungarians were being pushed back out of Galicia towards the Carpathian Mountains. The Russians advanced all the way to the Carpathians before stopping. However, an offensive by Germany and Austria-Hungary into Russian Poland, the Gorlice–Tarnów offensive, caught the Russians off guard and threatened the armies on the Carpathian front with encirclement. In the summer of 1915 the Stavka ordered a Great Retreat, abandoning their gains in Galicia, Poland, and part of the Baltic region.

Because of this, on 23 August 1915, Emperor Nicholas II took command of the army himself. He appointed General Mikhail Alekseyev to replace Yanushkevich as the Supreme Commander's chief of staff, after which the performance of the Stavka improved significantly. He ran the Stavka almost on his own and directed military operations from August 1915 to March 1917. Alekseyev was seen as the de facto leader of the Russian Imperial Army during the Emperor's tenure as Supreme Commander. During this time there was the Lake Naroch offensive against the Germans, which was unsuccessful, though they did capture the Ottoman Empire's fortress of Erzurum in the Caucasus. The Brusilov Offensive in 1916 caused massive damage to the Austro-Hungarian Army, but at the cost of high casualties. However, by the end of 1916 and early 1917, the losses of the Russian Imperial Army were being replaced and the armaments industry was meeting the needs of the troops, making it still an effective fighting force.

=== 1917: Revolution ===
==== February to October ====
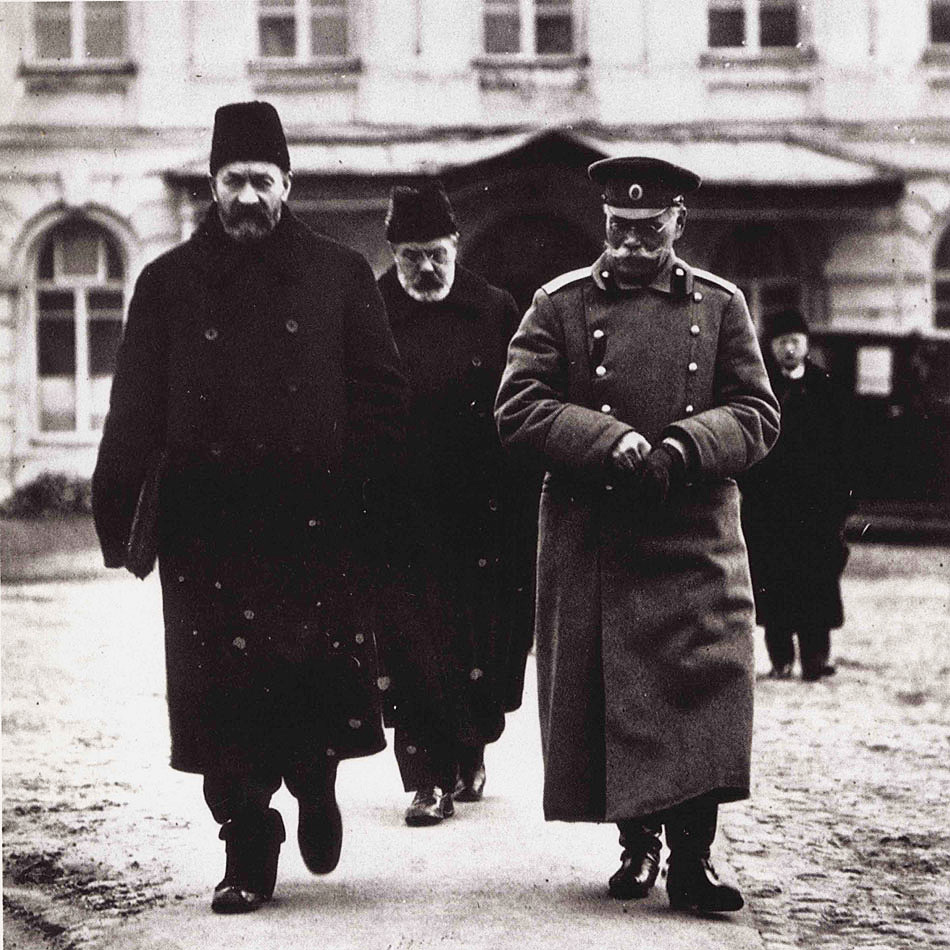
General Alekseyev with Prince Lvov and War Minister Guchkov at the Stavka, 1917.

After the start of the Russian Revolution, the advice of General Alekseyev and the Stavka officers, as well as every front and army commander, to Emperor Nicholas II that he should abdicate was the decisive factor in him making that decision, on 15 March 1917. Their belief was that a new government would stabilize the home front and allow the war to continue: more liberal generals wanted a constitutional monarchy while conservative ones wanted to replace Nicholas II with Grand Duke Nicholas. After the abdication, both Nicholas II and the Grand Duke urged the officers and troops to recognize the authority of the Russian Provisional Government. The majority of the officer corps took an oath of loyalty to the new government. The Russian Army and its command structure, the Stavka, became the only institution of the Romanov dynasty that survived the February Revolution as it was still needed because of the ongoing war. A committee of the Provisional Government attempted to purge senior officers who refused to cooperate with the new authorities, but the Stavka conducted its own purge, removing those who were too friendly with the Provisional Government, so the composition of the senior ranks did not change too much from before.

Grand Duke Nicholas briefly took control as Supreme Commander after the emperor's abdication, which was accepted by the head of the Provisional Government, Prince Georgy Lvov, but another minister, Alexander Kerensky, threatened to resign if a Romanov was allowed to be the head of the army. Lvov gave in to revolutionary pressure and when the Grand Duke arrived at Mogilev he was informed that he had been replaced by General Mikhail Alekseyev.

Also starting in March 1917, the authority of the officer corps over the soldiers began eroding. When the Petrograd Soviet Order No. 1 reached the front lines it was misinterpreted by many to mean that the troops no longer had to follow orders from officers and could elect their own commanders, which, combined with the emperor's abdication and the lack of direction from the Stavka on situation, meant it became difficult for the Provisional Government to get the troops to follow orders from their officers over the next several months. An Order No. 2 issued together by the State Duma and the Petrograd Soviet was ineffective at restoring the authority of officers and undoing the damage caused by Order No. 1. Meanwhile, the Stavka underestimated the influence of the Petrograd Soviet and the weakness of the Provisional Government. This was in part because the location of the supreme headquarters 400 miles away from Petrograd insulated the Stavka from political developments in the capital.

The Stavka had planned an offensive for May 1917 to assist Britain and France in the west since well before the February Revolution. Those plans were delayed by the revolutionary events, and were further undermined by the creation of soldiers' committees and the decline in the officers' authority. The Stavka and the War Ministry still wanted an offensive to support their allies and unite the army behind the war effort. Because of this Alexander Kerensky, who replaced Prince Georgy Lvov as the head of the Provisional Government, toured the front line and gave speeches in the spring of 1917. There was still patriotism and significant support among the troops to continue the war, and when some infantry units murdered their officers or otherwise mutinied, cavalry and artillery units were willing to put down the uprisings. Kerensky and Brusilov, who replaced Alekseyev as Supreme Commander just before the start of the Kerensky Offensive, also responded to infantry mutinies by organizing new units of shock troops called the "Battalions of Death" or shock battalions, made up of volunteers from the front line troops, rear-area troops, and civilians. During 1917 there were about 600,000 volunteers for the shock battalions.

The June offensive, or Kerensky offensive, initially made gains against the Austro-Hungarian Army, but these were reversed by the arrival of German reinforcements and the Russian forces were pushed back. Despite problems with desertion and some units refusing to attack, the Russian Army overall maintained its discipline after the offensive and willingness to fight defensively, in defense of the country and the revolution.

At a meeting of the Stavka commanders on 29 July 1917, with Kerensky in attendance, Brusilov's chief of staff Anton Denikin criticized all of the Provisional Government's measures since March 1917 and called for the return of capital punishment to restore discipline among the troops. Kerensky saw the need to restore order in the army after the failed offensive, and appointed Lavr Kornilov to replace Brusilov as Supreme Commander because he was always an opponent of the army reforms. But in September 1917, Kornilov and other members of the Stavka made the decision to disperse in a military coup the Petrograd Soviet, and, according to some accounts, the Provisional Government itself, to create a military dictatorship. There are contradictory accounts whether he wanted to work with the Provisional Government against the Soviet or to remove it, but in any case he ordered the 3rd Cavalry Corps under General Krymov to enter Petrograd. Kerensky learned of this and dismissed Kornilov as the head of the army and ordered the troops to not enter the city. After Klembovsky, Lukomsky, and several other senior generals rejected Kerensky's offer of an appointment as the new Supreme Commander, he took on the position himself.

The Kornilov coup fell apart quickly as the majority of the 3rd Cavalry Corps refused to enter the city, except for the officers and some Cossacks. Kerensky briefly appointed General Alekseyev as his chief of staff and sent him to Mogilev to restore the Provisional Government's control over the Stavka, where he arrested Kornilov and several of his supporters. After the outbreak of the October Revolution and the disappearance of Kerensky, on 16 November 1917, his chief of staff (who succeeded Alekseyev in September) became the new Supreme Commander. Even when the Provisional Government ceased to exist, the Stavka was still in command of the millions of troops in the Russian Army.

==== Bolshevik takeover ====
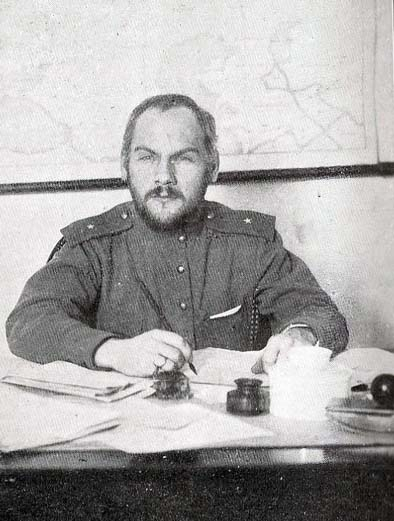
Nikolai Krylenko, the Bolshevik-appointed Supreme Commander.

At first Vladimir Lenin made no attempt to dismiss Dukhonin from his position and tried to work with the Stavka. After the October Revolution events in Petrograd the military leaders in Mogilev were unable to make any decisions about how to respond to the situation, since they still prioritized the war with Germany and wanted to avoid a civil war. Also at the Stavka were five imprisoned generals, including Kornilov and his accomplices – Anton Denikin, Ivan Romanovsky, Alexander Lukomsky, and Sergey Markov. Dukhonin did not want to hand them over to the Bolsheviks, and the troops in the area were more loyal to Kornilov than to him or they had been to Kerensky. Kornilov suggested to Dukhonin that they should fight the Bolsheviks there using Polish, Czechoslovak, and the reliable Cossack divisions. Lukomsky advised moving the Stavka to Kiev and using the more organized units of the Southwestern Front to continue the fight. But Dukhonin's indecisiveness prevented them from acting on any of these plans. He received an order from Lenin on 20 November 1917 to open peace talks with the Germans. He delayed by asking some questions, but finally declared on 22 November that he could not implement the order because the Council of People's Commissars was not a legitimate authority. Lenin then appointed Ensign Nikolai Krylenko as the new Supreme Commander, who left Petrograd for Mogilev on 24 November.

At the same time, Lenin and the Revolutionary Military Committee, which was having difficulty asserting control over the Petrograd garrison and other troops near the capital, had to exert influence over the rest of the army outside of their vicinity. Lenin disavowed the counter-revolutionary generals and called on soldiers' committees at the front to start peace talks themselves, which led to local ceasefires. In the meantime Krylenko was on his way to Mogilev with pro-Bolshevik sailors and Red Guards. Dukhonin had with him six shock battalions, but none of them wanted to fight, and Dukhonin could not make up his mind whether or not to make a stand. Politicians, foreign representatives, and some officers left Mogilev on 2 December 1917. Around that time Dukhonin signed an order to release the imprisoned generals, who proceeded to escape south towards the Don territory, which they thought would be anti-Bolshevik. After Krylenko's arrival, a mob of soldiers that he arrived with took Dukhonin and murdered him.

From December 1917 to March 1918 main goal of the Bolsheviks' military authorities at that point was to demobilize the "old army" and to create a new force capable of internal security. However, a Russian Army still needed to be maintained at the front lines while negotiations with Germany were going on. Krylenko visited the Stavka occasionally as the Supreme Commander but left most of his work in Mogilev to Alexander Miasnikian, the elected commander of the Army's Western Front. The Revolutionary Field Staff under Vladimir Antonov-Ovseenko, created by the Bolsheviks in December 1917, worked separately from the Stavka and was building a new force capable of serving their interests.

=== 1918: Demobilization ===
General Mikhail Bonch-Bruyevich, the brother of one of Lenin's associates, later took over the Stavka as the chief of staff to the Supreme Commander. In January 1918 he told Krylenko, who was uninterested in the Stavka, that Russian Army units at the front were decaying and that some forces should be organized to put up at least token resistance if the peace talks with the Germans broke down. But Krylenko and the Bolsheviks wanted to prevent the emergence of another Kornilov. On 19 February, after the German Army broke the arimistice and began advancing, Bonch-Bruyevich moved what remained of the Stavka east, before Lenin ordered him to bring it to Petrograd. After arriving in the capital on 22 February, Lenin put him and some generals from the Stavka to work on assembling units to confront the Germans. Workers were directly recruited, and on 23 February, about 60,000 volunteered for the Workers' and Peasants' Red Army in Petrograd and 20,000 in Moscow. The Bolsheviks received peace terms from the Germans for what would become the Treaty of Brest-Litovsk, and decided to accept, signing it in March 1918. The Red Army was formally established on 28 January, while the old army was demobilized in March, at which point the Stavka was dissolved. Some former members of the Stavka, including Bonch-Bruyevich, formed a new Supreme Military Council when the Red Army was created.

== Supreme Commanders ==
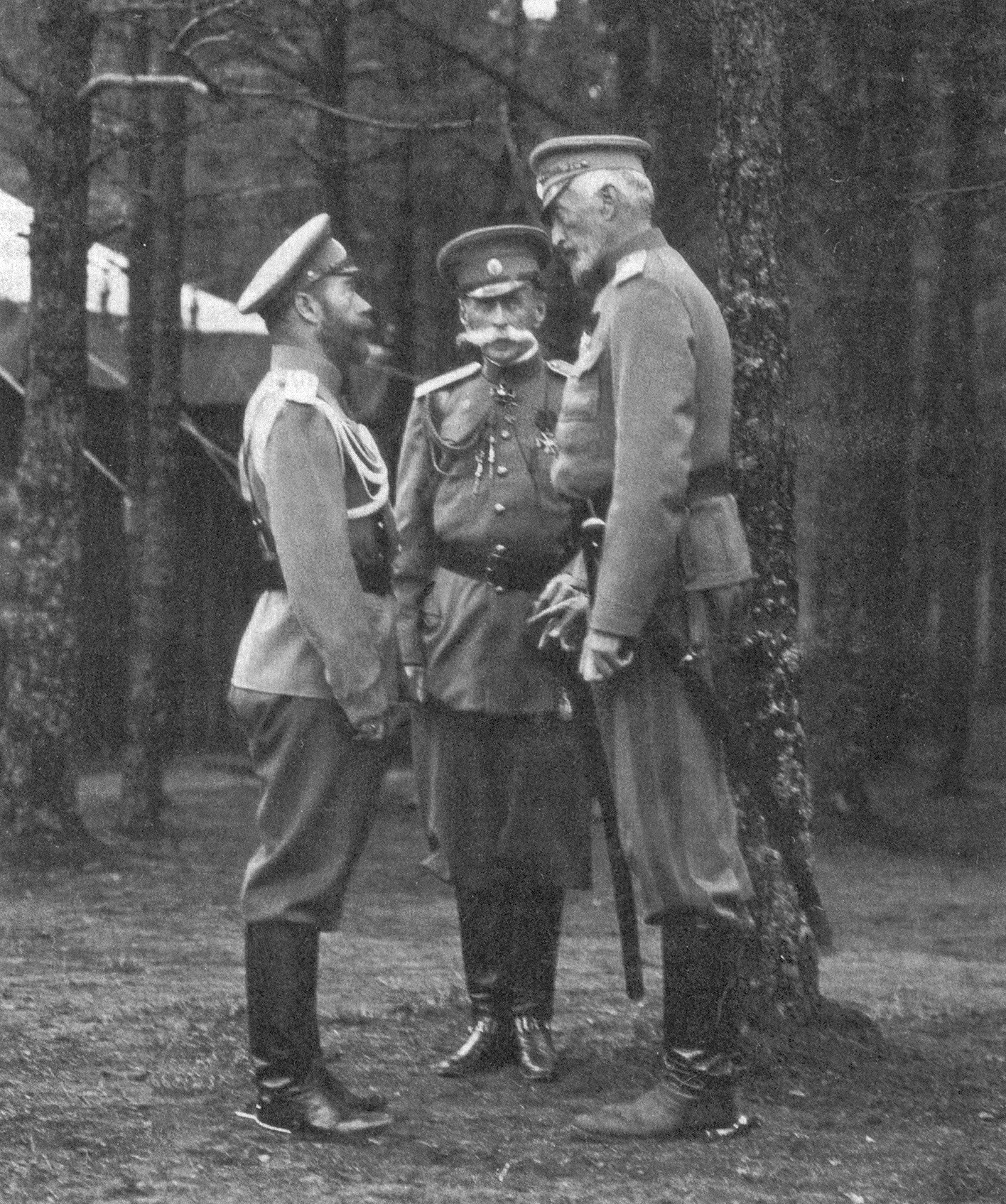
Tsar Nicholas II (left) and Grand Duke Nicholas (right) at the Stavka in 1914.

According to its regulations, in wartime the Russian Imperial Army in the field was led by a Supreme Commander appointed by and responsible to the Emperor, and was tasked with implementing the Emperor's general directives for military operations.

- Grand Duke Nicholas Nicholaevich was appointed as Supreme Commander by Emperor Nicholas II on 31 July 1914.
- Emperor Nicholas II took direct command of the army with himself as Supreme Commander on 23 August 1915.
- Grand Duke Nicholas briefly returned to the post after the emperor's abdication on 15 March 1917.
- General Mikhail Alekseyev was the Supreme Commander after the Grand Duke stepped down on 24 March 1917.
- General Aleksei Brusilov replaced Alekseyev on 4 June 1917, ahead of the Kerensky Offensive.
- General Lavr Kornilov was appointed Supreme Commander on 31 July 1917.
- Alexander Kerensky assumed the post himself on 10 September 1917 after the Kornilov coup attempt when several generals, including Klembovsky and Lukomsky, refused it.
- Nikolay Dukhonin, Kerensky's chief of staff, became the Supreme Commander on 16 November 1917 when Kerensky disappeared.
- Nikolai Krylenko was appointed by the Bolsheviks to replace him on 22 November after Dukhonin refused to follow orders, and arrived at the Stavka on 3 December 1917.

Directly subordinated to the Supreme Commander were the front commanders (consisting of the Northern, Western, and Southwestern Fronts, later also included the Romanian Front) and two Navy commanders, the heads of the Baltic Fleet and the Black Sea Fleet.

== Headquarters staff ==
As of 1913, according to army regulations, the Supreme Commander of the armies in the field was to be assisted by the following:

- the chief of staff, the main assistant to the Supreme Commander;
- the Quartermaster-General, responsible for operations and distribution of troops. His department consisted of four sections: operations, records, reconnaissance, and topography;
- the Adjutant-General, responsible for personnel and the organization of troops. His department included the Adjutant-General's office and the Medical Chancery;
- the head of the railway department, responsible for the railways in the theater of operations.

When the war broke out in 1914 the actual organization was slightly different. Besides the departments of the Quartermaster-General and the Adjutant-General, which were the same, there were also the heads of:

- The communications department;
- The naval department;
- The diplomatic staff from the Foreign Ministry;
- The civil affairs staff.

The last one was needed because the Supreme Commander also had broad civil authority in the areas that were near the front lines. This was a large region that included Finland, Poland, Belarus, the Baltic states, and much of Ukraine, in addition to the territory of Russia itself.

=== Foreign attachés ===
The Stavka was accompanied by military attachés from Russia's allies in the Entente. These included generals and officers from France, Britain, Belgium, Serbia, Montenegro, and Japan.

== Bibliography ==
- Cockfield, Jamie H. (2019). Russia's Iron General: The Life of Aleksei A. Brusilov, 1853–1926. Lanham: Lexington Books. ISBN 978-1-4985-7252-1.
- DiNardo, Richard (2020). The Eastern Front in 1915. Santa Barbara: ABC-CLIO. ISBN 978-1-4408-4454-6.
- Florinsky, Michael T. (2017) [1931]. The End of the Russian Empire. Borodino Books. ISBN 978-1-78720-791-2.
- General Staff, War Office (1914). Handbook of the Russian Army. London: Imperial War Museum. ISBN 0-89839-250-0.
- Katkov, George (1980). Russia 1917: The Kornilov Affair. London; New York: Longman. ISBN 978-0-582-49101-4.
- Kenez, Peter (1971). Civil War in South Russia, 1918: The First Year of the Volunteer Army. University of California Press. ISBN 978-0-520-31226-5.
- Reese, Roger R. (2019). The Imperial Russian Army in Peace, War, and Revolution, 1856–1917. Lawrence: University Press of Kansas. ISBN 978-0-7006-2860-5.
- Robinson, Paul (2014). Grand Duke Nikolai Nikolaevich: Supreme Commander of the Russian Army. Cornell University Press. ISBN 978-1-5017-5709-9.
- Stone, David R. (2015). The Russian Army in the Great War: The Eastern Front, 1914-1917. Lawrence: University Press of Kansas. ISBN 978-0-7006-3308-1.
- Weld, E. Rebecca (1917). "Current Events". In Smith, Heman C. (ed.). Journal of History. Vol. 9–10. Board of Publication of the Reorganized Church of Jesus Christ of Latter Day Saints.
- Wildman, Allan K. (1980). The End of the Russian Imperial Army: The Old Army and the Soldiers' Revolt (March-April, 1917). Princeton University Press. ISBN 978-1-4008-4771-6.
- Ziemke, Earl F. (2004). The Red Army, 1918–1941: From Vanguard of World Revolution to America's Ally. Taylor & Francis. ISBN 978-1-135-76918-5.
