= Kornilov Shock Regiment =

- Корниловскій ударный полкъ (Note: Pre-reform Russian)
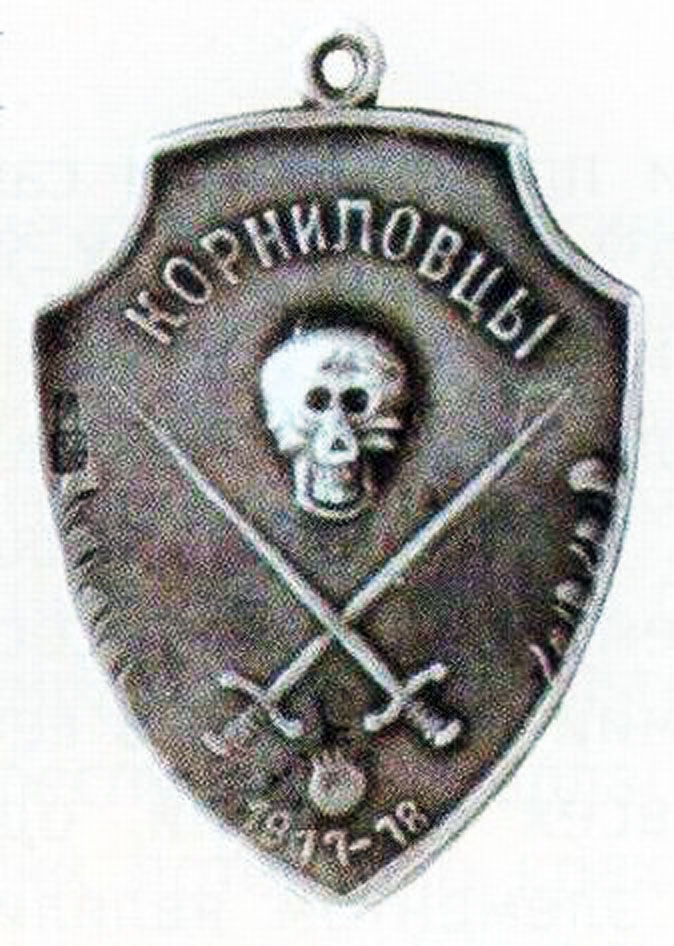
- Active: 1917–1922
- Country: Russia
- Allegiance: Russian Provisional Government; South Russian Government
- Branch: Russian Army; Armed Forces of South Russia
- Type: Infantry
- Role: Shock troops
- Size: Regiment (1917-1919); Division (1919-1922)
- Nickname: Kornilovites
- Patron: Lavr Kornilov
- Engagements: World War I; Kerensky offensive; Russian Civil War; Kornilov affair; Ice March; Advance on Moscow (1919)

The Kornilov Shock Regiment (Russian: Корни́ловский уда́рный полк), previously the 1st Shock Detachment (Russian: 1-й Ударный отряд) and also called Kornilovites (корниловцы), was a shock unit of the Russian Army founded during World War I that later was part of the Volunteer Army during the Russian Civil War. It became the last regiment of the Russian Army to be formed and the first regiment of the Volunteer Army.

== History ==
=== World War I ===
After the February Revolution in 1917 the Russian Army faced a rapid decline in discipline and morale. To address to the unwillingness to go on the offensive by ordinary infantry, the Russian Provisional Government, on the initiative of Southwestern Front commander General Aleksei Brusilov, began forming "revolutionary shock battalions" from existing military units, and "battalions of death" from civilian volunteers and troops in rear area or support units. Members of these units were identified by red and black chevrons and a death's head symbol on their uniform. They were given specialized training in storming tactics, and with machine guns and grenades. The shock units were entrusted with accomplishing the most important objectives, and the members of these units took an oath that included pledging to never be captured alive, to respect the political views of other soldiers, and to never let their morale fall.

In June 1917, General Lavr Kornilov, the commander of the Russian Eighth Army in the Southwestern Front, ordered the creation of a volunteer shock detachment from soldiers and officers, which became known as the 1st Shock Detachment. He let an adjutant at the Eighth Army headquarters, Captain Mitrofan Nezhentsev, form the unit, who put it together initially from officers and praporshchiks. Nezhentsev wanted the shock unit to be an example to inspire the rest of the army, in response to the indiscipline following the February Revolution. After spending some time in training, the Shock Detachment consisted of two battalions, three machine gun detachments, a recon unit with Czechoslovak volunteers, and a cavalry scout unit with Don Cossacks. Captain Nezhentsev was in command. The unit was finished forming by early July 1917 and received its banner from General Kornilov, which was black and had the words "1st Shock Detachment." They added "Kornilov" to the name.

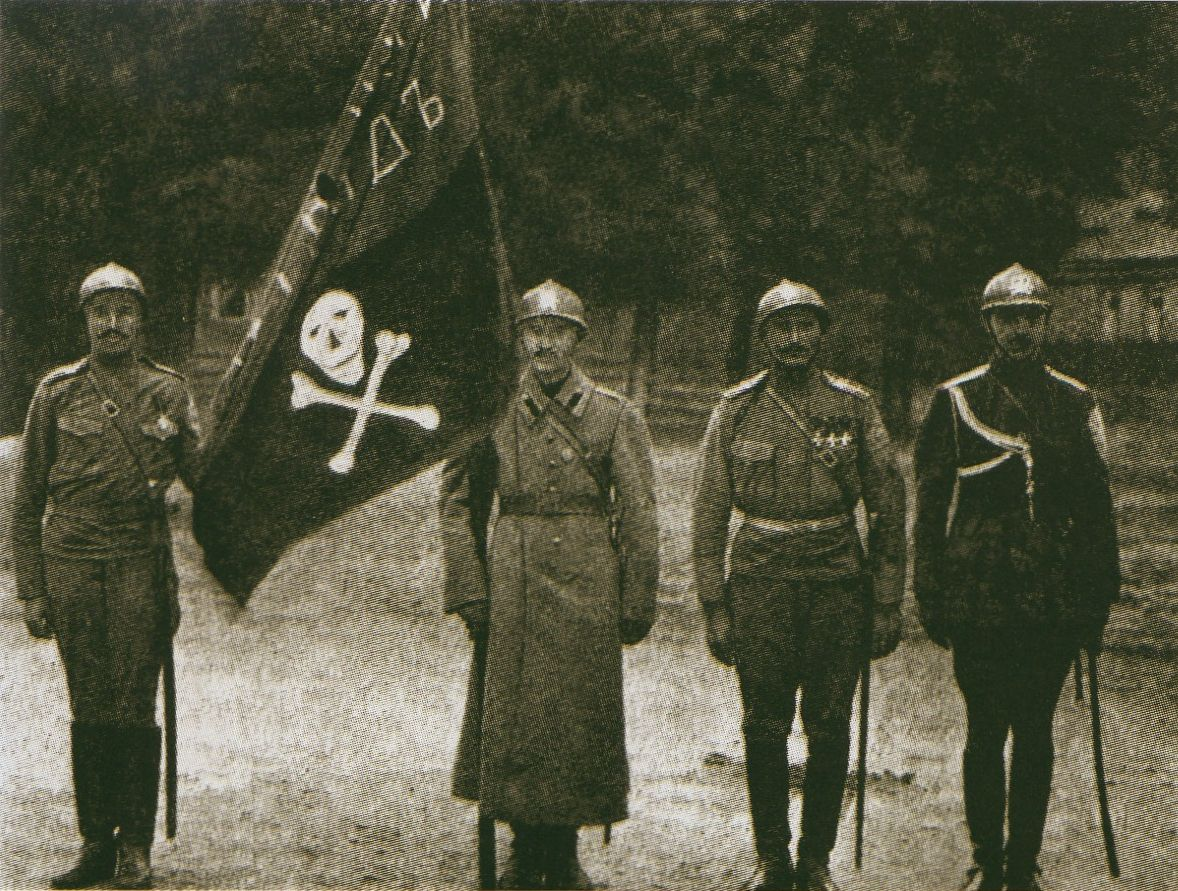
The banner of the 1st Shock Detachment, circa July 1917

At the start of the Kerensky offensive in July 1917 the Kornilov Shock Detachment took part in the battles near Yamnitsa and Pavelche.

=== Russian Revolution ===
In August 1917 it was renamed the Kornilov Shock Regiment, but after the Kornilov affair its name was changed to 1st Russian or Slavonic Shock Regiment. The "Slavonic" name reflected the fact that the regiment included Czech volunteers from the Russian army's Czechoslovak Legion, who wanted to preserve the unit from being disbanded by the Russian Provisional Government. Its members, including the Czechs, still continued wearing the original Kornilovite uniform.

=== Russian Civil War ===
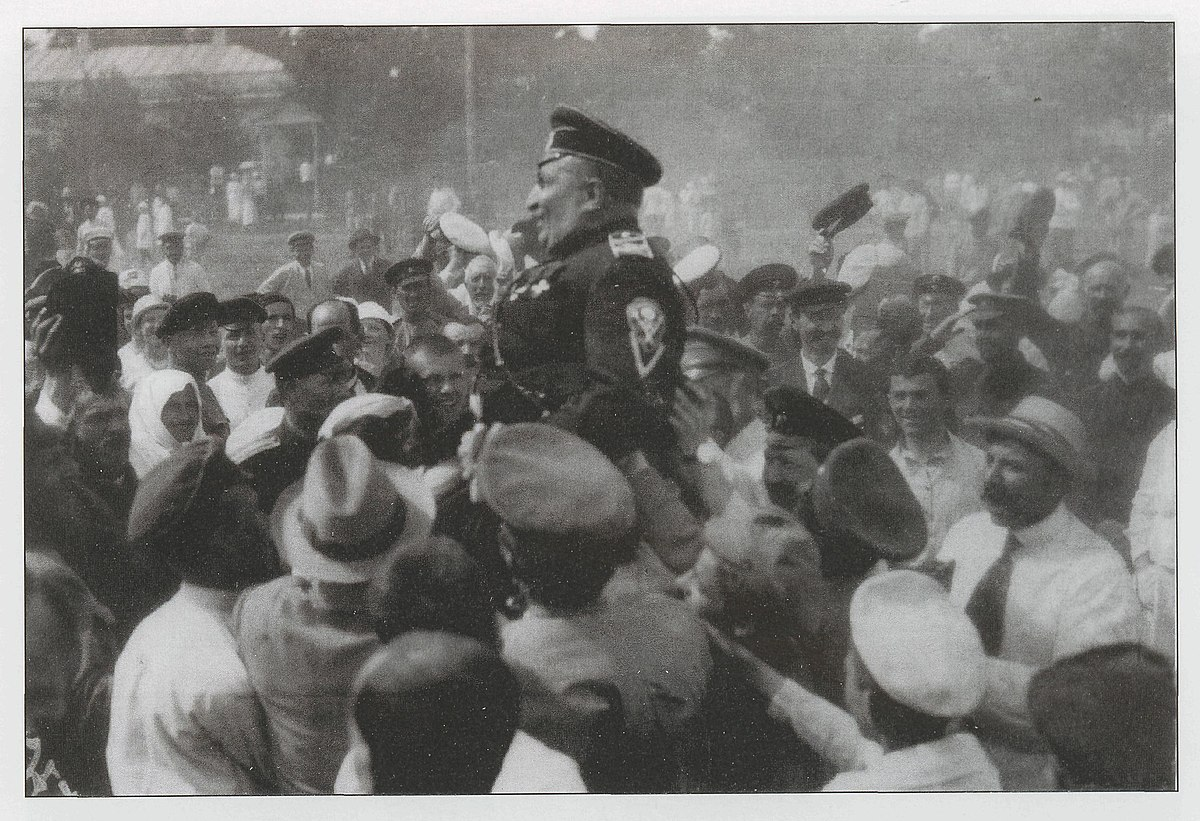
May-Mayevsky in Poltava after its capture in 1919

After the October Revolution members of the regiment went with Kornilov to southern Russia, where the Don Cossack territory became a base for the anti-communist Whites, and they joined the Volunteer Army.

The Kornilov Shock Regiment became one of the first three regiments of the army, along with the Independent Officers' Regiment and the Partisan Regiment. In early 1918, as the Don Cossack lands fell to the Red Army, the volunteers traveled south during the winter on foot in what became the Ice March. They were pursued and fought off attacks by much larger Red Army forces and made it to the Kuban Cossack territory. After a failed attack on Yekaterinodar, in which Kornilov himself was killed, Anton Denikin led them back north to the Don Territory, where the Cossacks had overthrown the Bolshevik occupation. The Ice March became legendary among the White movement and saw them travel 1,050 miles over 70 days, during which the Volunteer Army fought in 33 battles. The Ice March failed to inspire an anti-Bolshevik uprising in the Kuban region, but it preserved the core of the Volunteer Army, which became part of the larger Armed Forces of South Russia.

During the rest of the Russian Civil War the Kornilovites underwent several reorganizations. In 1919 several regiments were formed and disbanded (the 2nd through 4th Kornilov Shock Regiments), which were part of a Kornilov Division or Brigade at different times. They took significant losses in the fighting in southern Russia in 1919 and 1920, and elements of the Kornilov Division were evacuated to Crimea in March 1920 as the Armed Forces of South Russia collapsed, where they became part of the Army of Wrangel. The surviving Kornilovites were part of the evacuation of Crimea in November 1920 and ended up living abroad.

== Uniform ==
The uniform of the Kornilov unit included a red and black cap, red and black shoulder boards with a "K" on them and a skull and cross bones badge, and a blue patch on their sleeve with "Корниловцы" in white letters and a skull with crossed bones or swords beneath it. Below the patch were black and red chevrons.

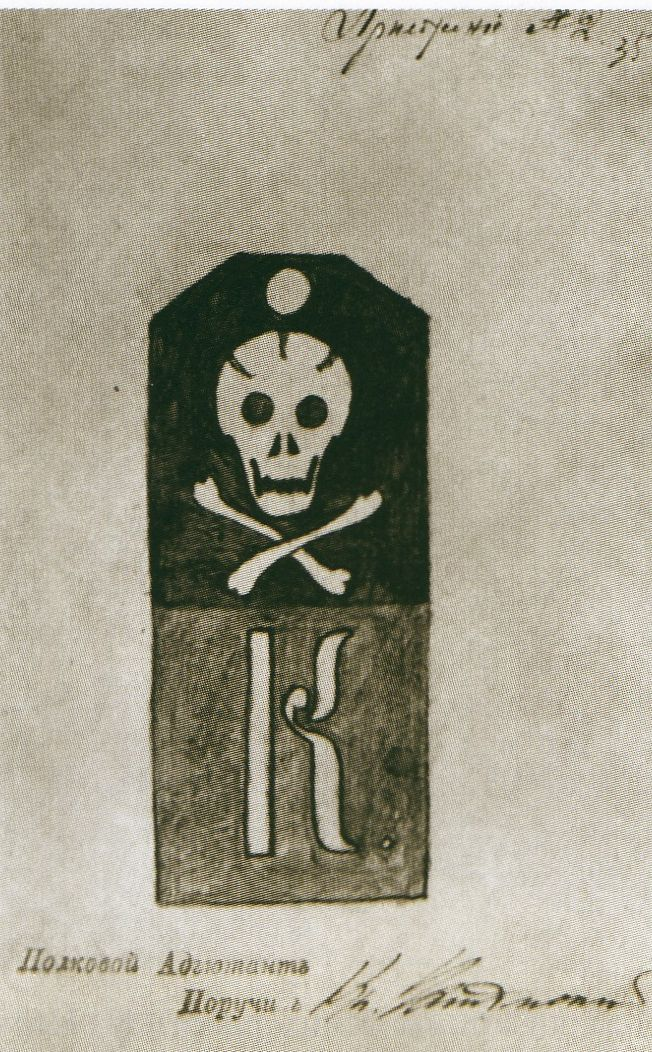
Kornilov regiment soldier shoulder board

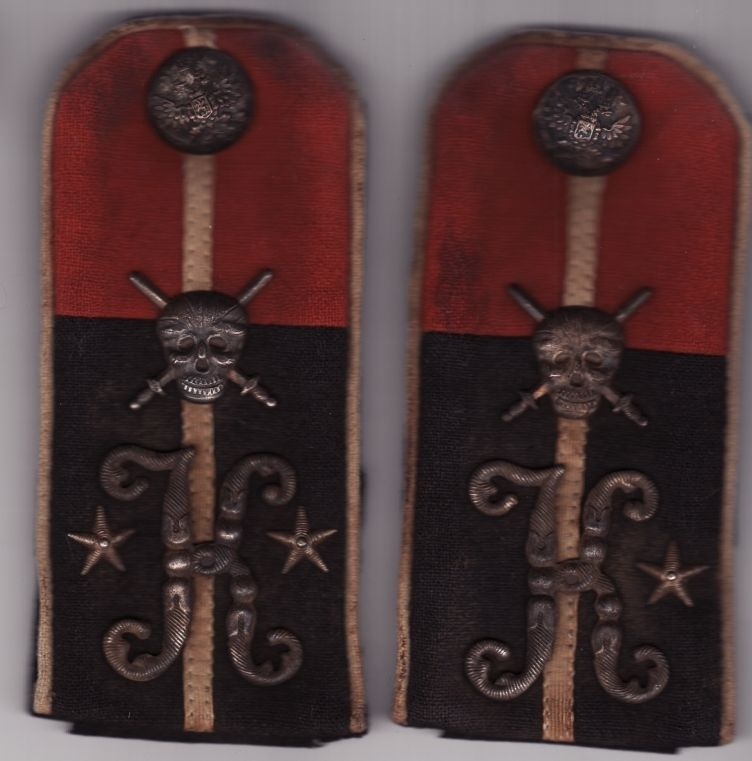
Kornilov regiment officer shoulder boards

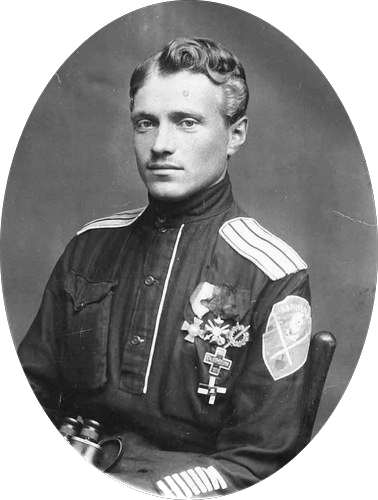
Mikhail Levitov in a Kornilovite uniform

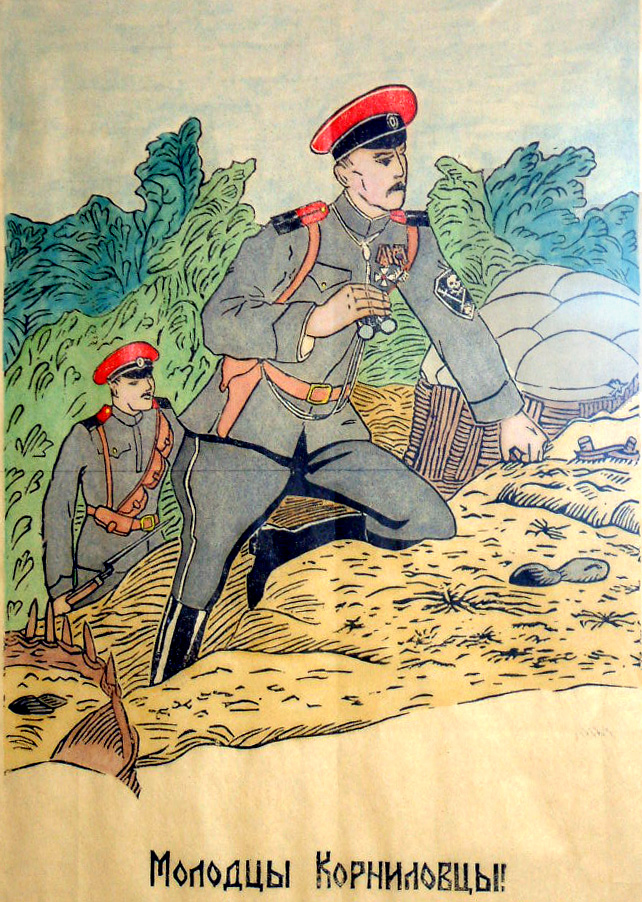
Propaganda poster, 1919

== Commanders ==
The list of commanding officers.

- Mitrofan Nezhentsev (1917 – 31 March 1918)
- Alexander Kutepov (31 March – 12 June 1918)
- Vladimir Indeikin (12 June – 31 October 1918)
- Nikolai Skoblin (31 October 1918 – summer 1919)
- Mikhail Peshnya (summer 1919 – 14 October 1919)
- Karp Gordienko (14 October 1919 – January 1920)
- Mikhail Dashkevich (acting, January – February 1920)
- Dmitry Shirkovsky (acting, February 1920)
- Vasily Chelyadinov (acting, February – July 1920)
- Mikhail Dashkevich (acting, July – 21 August 1920)
- Nikolai Skoblin (late 1920 – 1922)
- Vladimir von Eger (commandant, 1918 – 1922)

== See also ==
- Battalions of Death

== Sources ==
- Bullock, David (2012). The Czech Legion 1914–20. Osprey Publishing. ISBN 978-1-84603-900-3.
- Smele, Jonathan D., ed. (2015). Historical Dictionary of the Russian Civil Wars, 1916–1926. Lanham, Maryland: Rowman & Littlefield. ISBN 978-1-4422-5280-6.
- Wildman, Allan (1987). The End of the Russian Imperial Army: The Road to Soviet Power and Peace. Vol. II. Princeton: Princeton University Press. ISBN 0-691-05504-1.
