= Ivan Zaplatin =

Russian politician (1872-?)

Ivan Zaplatin Russian: Иван Заплатин
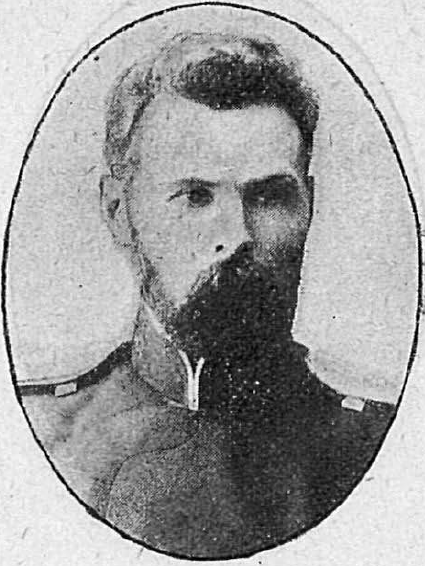
- 1907

Deputy of the Second Imperial Duma
- In office 20 February 1907 – 3 June 1907
- Monarch: Nicholas II

Personal details
- Born: Ivan Vasilyevich Zaplatin; 21 January 1872 Orenburg Governorate, Russian Empire
- Died: after 1919
- Party: Trudoviks

Ivan Vasilyevich Zaplatin (Russian: Иван Васильевич Заплатин; January 21, 1872, Orenburg Governorate — after 1919) was a major (voyskovoy starshina) of Imperial Russian Army, a bakery butter producer, a deputy of the Second Imperial Duma from the Orenburg Governorate in 1907, who had a "moderately progressive" political position. He founded the Ural Union of butter-producing cooperatives (1910), which organized the export of Siberian and Ural butter to Europe. During the Kornilov affair in 1917, he was the commandant of the Tauride Palace and informed the Bolsheviks of the military actions of the Kornilov troops and commands of the headquarters of the Petrograd Military District.

== Literature ==
- Заплатин Иван Васильевич (in Russian) // Государственная дума Российской империи: 1906—1917 / Б. Ю. Иванов, А. А. Комзолова, И. С. Ряховская. — Москва: РОССПЭН, 2008. — P. 205. — 735 p. — ISBN 978-5-8243-1031-3.
- Члены Государственной Думы (портреты и биографии). Второй созыв. 1907—1912 гг. / Сост. М. М. Боиович. — Москва, 1907. — P. 213. (in Russian)
- Ганин А. В., Семёнов В. Г. Заплатин Иван Васильевич // Офицерский корпус Оренбургского казачьего войска. 1891—1945: Биографический справочник. — М.: Русский путь; Библиотека-фонд «Русское Зарубежье», 2007. — P. 230. — 676 с. — ISBN 978-5-85887-259-7. (in Russian)
- Заплатин, Иван Васильевич (in Russian) // Челябинская область: энциклопедия / гл. ред. К. Н. Бочкарёв. — Челябинск: Каменный пояс, 2008. — Т. 2. — Д—И. — 672 с. — ISBN 978-5-88771-072-3.
