= St. Nicholas Monastery Complex =

Monastic complex in Belarus

Coordinates: 53.8940°N 30.3457°E

St. Nicholas Monastery
- Свята-Мікольскі жаночы манастыр
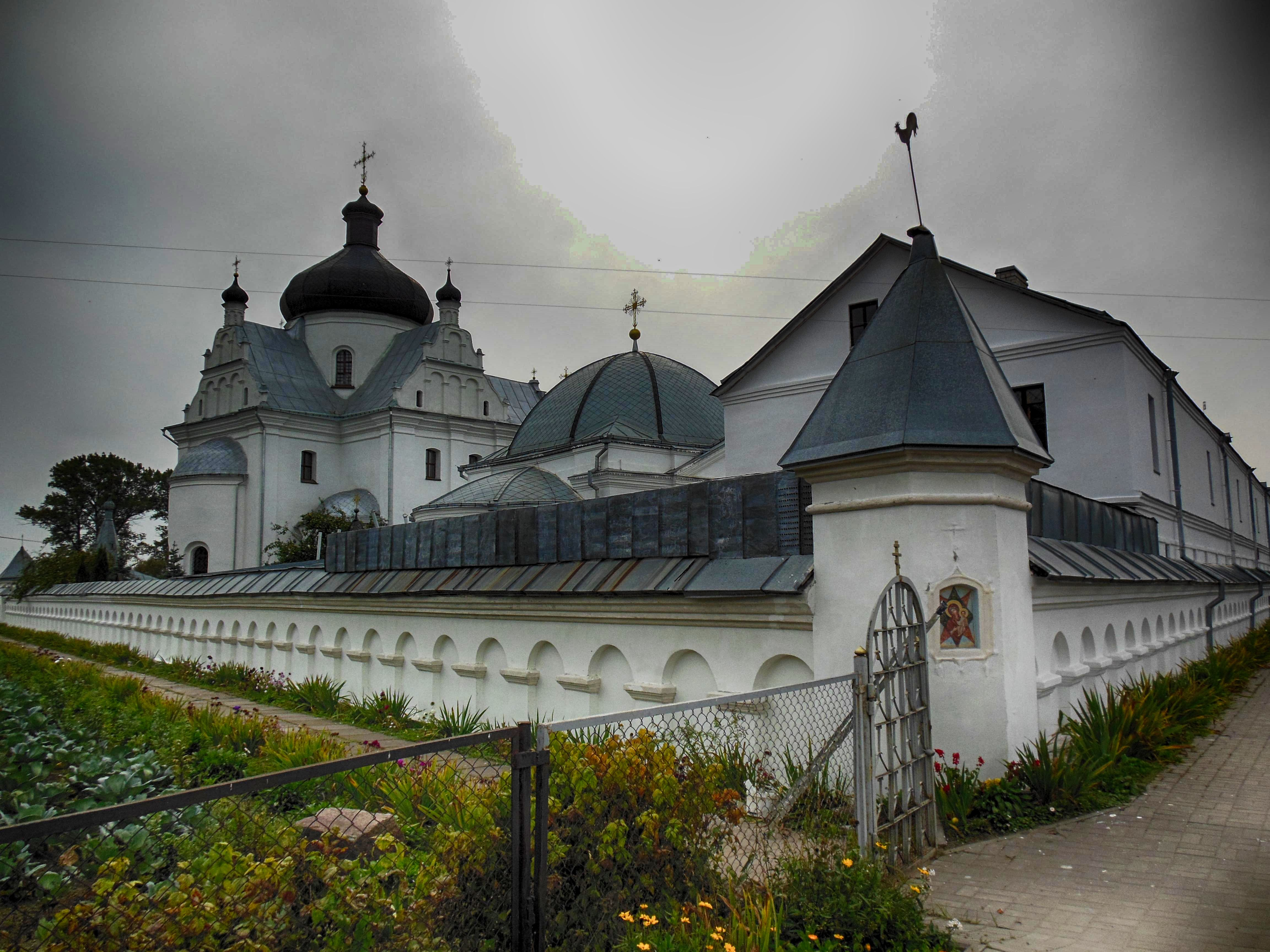
- Monastery Complex from behind

Religion
- Affiliation: Belarusian Orthodox Church
- Year consecrated: 1672

Location
- Location: Mogilev
- Country: Belarus
- Interactive map of St. Nicholas Monastery

Architecture
- Style: Baroque
- Established: 1637

St. Nicholas Monastery Complex is an active women's Orthodox monastery of the Belarusian Exarchate in Mogilev. The ensemble includes St. Nicholas Cathedral and Church of St Onuphrius, it is a monument of Baroque architecture in Belarus.

== History ==
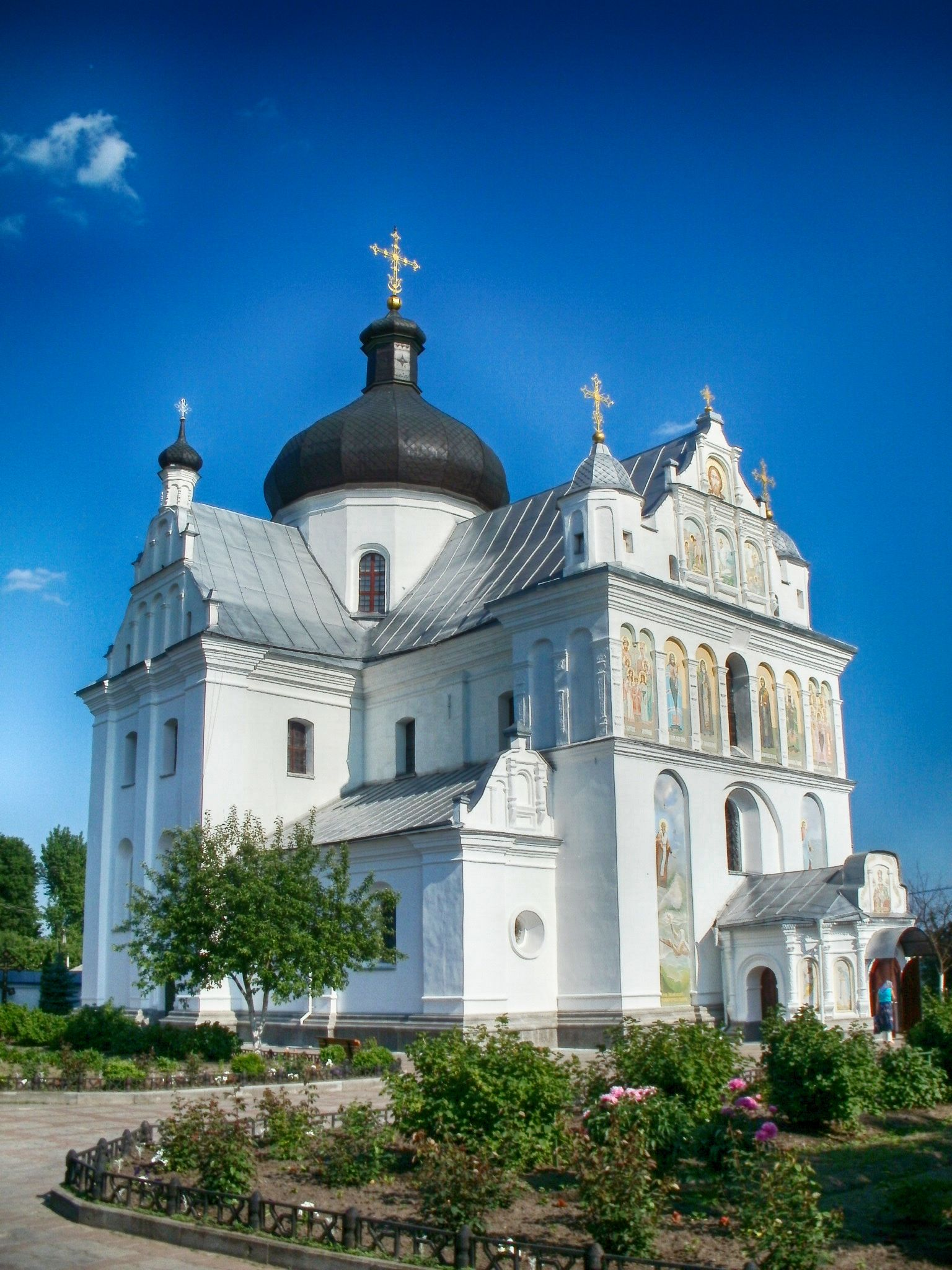
St. Nicholas Church in 2011

=== XVII — XIX Centuries ===
The complex is situated in the Dnieper river valley. The construction started in the XVII century, when Metropolitan Peter Mogila was granted permission to build a church by the king Władysław IV Vasa. Under the rule of Sylvester Kosiv in the Mogilev diocese the first wooden church in the name of St Nicholas was built in 1637. The stone church was erected in 1669-1672 and consecrated by the bishop Teodozjusz Wasilewicz. The church is a three-nave cross-dome basilica with an octahedral light tambour and a large bulbous cupola over the middle part. The dominant architectural feature of the church was a two-tower main facade with a figured pediment decorated with a set of diversiform tiered bays.

In the early XVII century the monastery was attacked by the Swedish and then Russian forces, fires significantly damaged the buildings. In 1719 the last conventuals had to move to the Barkolabsky monastery. In the same time St Nicholas was used as a fratry, it served as a parish up until the 1930s. In 1793 the archbishop Grigorij Konisski initiated construction of a warm winter cathedral that was consecrated by the archbishop Anastazy Bratanowski-Romanenko in 1798.

=== XIX — XX Centuries ===
In 1915-1917 the Stavka of the Supreme Commander was located in Mogilev and the Emperor Nicholas with family attended services in the St Nicholas cathedral.

In the Soviet era the monastery suffered the same persecution as the rest of Russian Church. The authorities confiscated Vasa Sacra, the iconostasis was destroyed. In 1934 the cathedral was closed, and in 1937 the Mogilev diocese was dismissed (it was reinstalled only in 1989).

In 1937-1941 the monastery was used as a transit prison, then in 1946 it was converted to book storage. During the 1991 reconstruction the specialists discovered multiple human remains. Presumably, they belonged to victims of Stalinist repressions who were kept in the prison during the 1930s.

=== Restitution ===
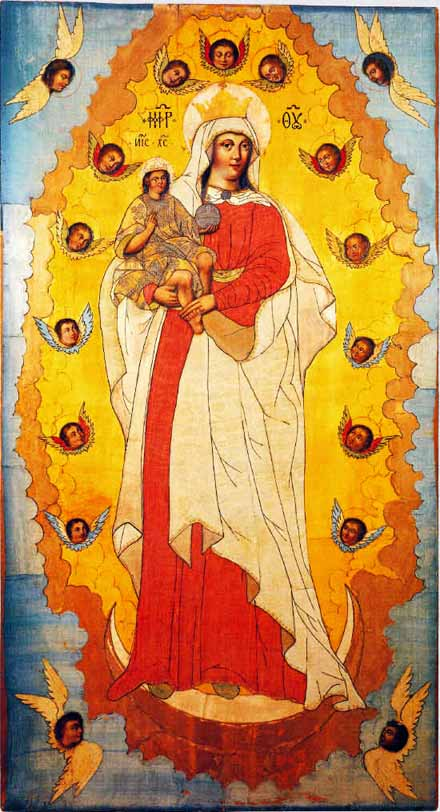
‘Our Lady Beneficial Sky’ Icon, 1682

Mogilev diocese was restituted in 1989 under ruling bishop Maksym Krocha. Hegumness Eugene Voloshuck became the first Mother Superior of the monastery. The winter Onuphrius cathedral was consecrated on March 28, 1991. On June 18, 1991, Patriarch Alexy II of Moscow visited the monastery and gifted it a chandelier.

The monastery keeps copies of famous icons such as the Byalynichy Mary, the Our Lady Beneficial Sky (Icon), and Mogilev-Bratsk icon of Divine Mother.

== World Heritage Status ==
This site was added to the UNESCO World Heritage Tentative List on January 30, 2004, in the Cultural category.
