= Nikolai Dukhonin =

Imperial Russian army general (1876–1917)

Nikolay Nikolayevich Dukhonin

Supreme Commander of the Russian Army
- In office 16 November – 22 November 1917
- Preceded by: Alexander Kerensky
- Succeeded by: Nikolai Krylenko

Personal details
- Born: 13 December 1876 Smolensk Governorate, Russian Empire
- Died: 3 December 1917 (aged 40) Mogilev, Russian Soviet Republic

Military service
- Allegiance: Russian Empire; Russian Republic (from 1917)
- Branch/service: Imperial Russian Army; Russian Army (from 1917)
- Years of service: 1894–1917
- Rank: General
- Unit: 3rd Army
- Commands: Imperial Russian Army
- Battles/wars: World War I

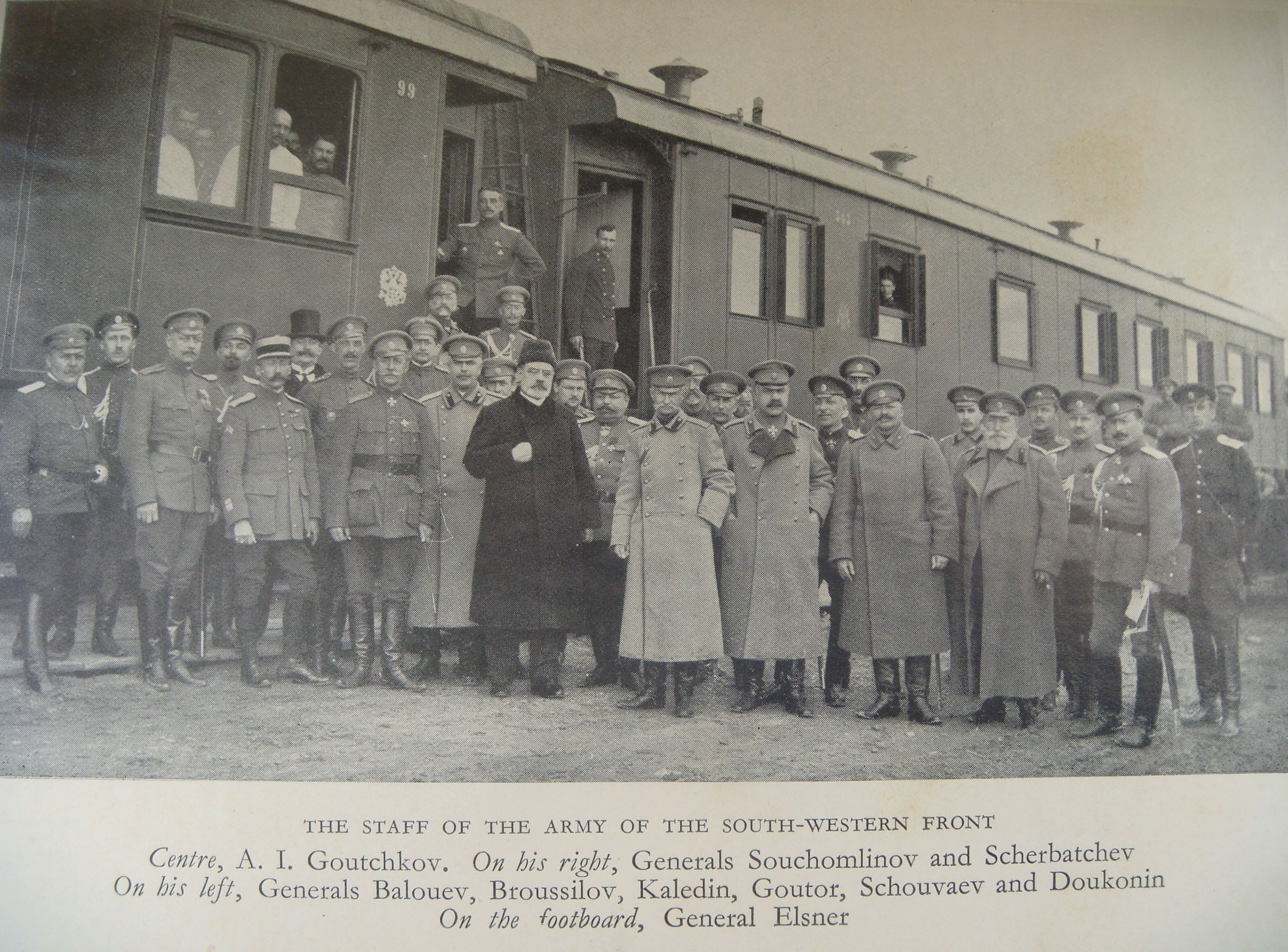
Staff of Russian army, WWI south-west front.jpg

Nikolay Nikolayevich Dukhonin (Russian: Никола́й Никола́евич Духо́нин; 13 December 1876 – 3 December 1917) was a Russian general who was briefly the last supreme commander of the Russian Army after the October Revolution before the Bolsheviks took control of it.

== Biography ==
Dukhonin was born in the Smolensk Governorate. He served in the Kiev Military District before the start of the First World War. There he gained some experience in intelligence work.

At the outset of the War, Dukhonin was given command of a Russian regiment. He was then assigned to the Third Army in Dubno under General Nikolai Ruzsky as senior adjutant of the intelligence department. In the spring of 1917 he was the chief of staff of the Southwestern Front, In August 1917, Dukhonin was Quartermaster General of the Southwestern Front, and was plucked from this relative obscurity by Alexander Kerensky to replace Mikhail Alekseyev as Chief of Staff at GHQ in Mogilev, as Alexeyev had resigned as a result of Lavr Kornilov's failed coup. It was Alexeyev who had suggested Dukhonin as his successor so that he could continue to influence affairs at Stavka in Mogilev.

When Kerensky fled Petrograd and then Russia following the seizure of power by the Bolsheviks in the October Revolution, Dukhonin became de facto Supreme Commander, albeit of an army that was rapidly disintegrating, and over which he exercised very little control. During the initial stages of the Bolshevik seizure of power the Council of People's Commissars instructed Dukhonin to cease wartime hostilities and open negotiations with the Central Powers. Vladimir Lenin and Nikolai Krylenko visited Dukhonin in Petrograd to discuss an armistice proposal. Dukhonin's response was adamant: on 22 November he categorically declined the directive of the Council of People's Commissars. He had discussed such a development with diplomats from the Entente governments. Dukhonin told Lenin that such an order could only be issued by "a government sustained by the army and the country".

Lenin immediately proceeded to a wireless station and broadcast news of Dukhonin's dismissal as Commander-in-Chief and Krylenko's replacement in his stead. The following day a joint note was issued by the military missions of Britain, France, Italy, Japan and Romania, citing the Treaty of 23 August 1914 by which the allies agreed not to conclude an armistice except by common consent. These missions were based at the General Headquarters in Mogilev. His last action was to order the release of the officers being held prisoner at Bikhov, most notably Kornilov and Anton Denikin.

Dukhonin subsequently surrendered to Krylenko in Mogilev, but he was murdered by a mob (possibly supported by Krylenko's Bolshevik military escort) near the railway station on 3 December 1917. There are multiple conflicting accounts of Dukhonin's death. According to the account of the former colonel Andrew Kalpashnikoff, a mob of soldiers and sailors bayoneted him to death on the spot on order of Red Army officer Pavel Dybenko. Kalpashnikoff also states that the next morning the Bolshevik soldiers and sailors amused themselves by using his (now stripped naked) corpse for target practice, which they had placed on the platform with a cigarette in its mouth. However, the journalist John Reed states that Krylenko "implored the soldiers not to harm Dukhonin, as he was to be taken to Petrograd and judged by the Revolutionary Tribunal", but was unable to stop the lynching when Dukhonin himself appeared at the window of the railway car in which he was imprisoned.

His family emigrated to Yugoslavia.
