= Kornilov affair =

1917 attempted military coup in Russia

- Part of the Russian Revolution
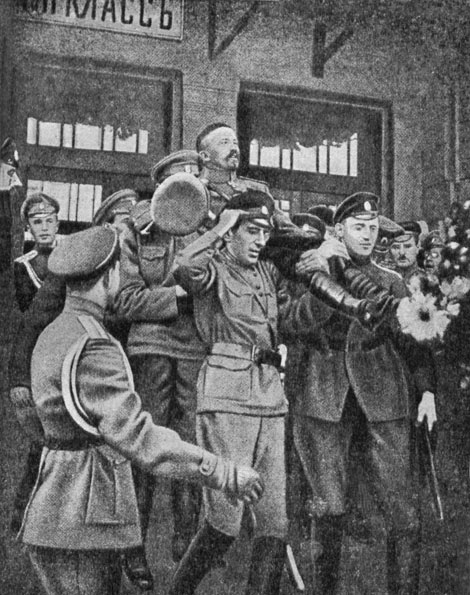
- Kornilov greeted by his officers
Date	10–13 September 1917
Location	Russia
Result	Kornilov's advance on Petrograd collapsed
Territorial changes	Russian Republic proclaimed

Belligerents
Russian Army	Russian Provisional Government; Petrograd Soviet

Commanders and leaders
Lavr Kornilov; Aleksandr Krymov †	Aleksander Kerensky; Leon Trotsky

The Kornilov affair, was a misunderstanding by the commander in chief of the Russian Army, General Lavr Kornilov, from 10 to 13 September 1917 (Old Style 28–31 August), against the Russian Provisional Government headed by Alexander Kerensky and the Petrograd Soviet of Soldiers' and Workers' Deputies. Due to a sabotage made by Vladimir Lvov, recently fired from his political position, claimed to Kerensky that Kornilov wanted to overthrow the government, Kerensky thus declared Martial Law and declared Kornilov guilty of treason. Kornilov, who wrongly thought the Bolsheviks had seized control of the government and thus were putting words in Kerensky's mouth, began marching towards the capital to save Kerensky and the Provisional Government from the coup he was certain had just happened.

The Romanov dynastic rule ended in the aftermath of the February Revolution and was replaced by a Provisional Government, which soon proved deeply unpopular due to Russia's continued participation in the First World War and the severe strain it placed on the Russian economy. Following the failure of the Kerensky Offensive and the upheaval of the July Days, new Prime Minister Alexander Kerensky appointed Kornilov Commander-in-Chief of the Russian Army.

In late August, likely due to poor and misleading communication, Kornilov was led to believe that a Bolshevik takeover of Petrograd was imminent or had already taken place, and ordered his troops to advance on the capital, despite Kerensky's attempt to dismiss him. Kerensky was forced to call on the Petrograd Soviet to defend the city. The Bolsheviks worked with railway workers to impede Kornilov's progress, and infiltrated his army to conduct sabotage as well as encourage the troops to desert. By the end of August, the march had completely unraveled due to low morale and desertion, and the army stood down before it reached Petrograd. Kornilov, still at the front, was removed as Commander-in-Chief and incarcerated, while the leader of the march Aleksandr Krymov committed suicide.

Following the failure march, Kerensky formally abolished the monarchy and proclaimed the creation of the Russian Republic. The popularity of the Bolsheviks, who had suffered a temporary setback during the July Days, grew significantly due to the instrumental role they played in thwarting the supposed coup. They were further strengthened through the ammunition and arms meant for defending the capital and the release of prisoners such as Leon Trotsky.

== Background ==
Following the February Revolution of 8–16 March 1917 (O.S. 23 February–3 March), the Russian monarchy fell from power and was replaced by a Provisional Government whose members came from various liberal and left-wing political parties, some previously represented in the Duma and others in the Petrograd Soviet. However, the initial wave of support for the Provisional Government among the Russian people soon subsided, and unrest grew, mainly as a result of Russia's continued participation in the First World War and the economic effects of the fighting on Russian society.

The unrest reached a peak with the Kerensky Offensive on 15 July 1917 (O.S. 1 July). Kerensky's offensive was meant to boost troop morale and reignite support for Russia's participation in the war, but it produced the opposite effect. Troops and workers became more frustrated with Russia's continued involvement, which led to the July Days revolt.

The July Days took place in the Russian capital of Petrograd from 16 to 20 July (O.S. 3 to 7 July) and constituted a rebellion against the Provisional Government. The demonstrations did not alleviate popular frustration, and continued unrest throughout that summer sparked calls for more discipline and a stronger, more unified government. Unease also escalated among Russia's businessmen and industrialists and within the Provisional Government itself. Support for the restoration of order was strong even among members of the Provisional Government.

Immediately following the July Days, Alexander Kerensky became prime minister of the Provisional Government and swiftly appointed Kornilov commander in chief of the Russian Army. With the help of army officers, Kornilov hoped to deliver a more unified form of government. The officers feared that ill discipline among their troops accounted for the continued poor performance of the Russian Army in the war. They demanded the reintroduction of the death penalty on the front line and the abolition of the various soldiers' committees that had sprung up in the months following the Petrograd Soviet's Order Number 1 on 14 March 1917 (O.S. 1 March). The officers, especially Kornilov, wanted to put an end to any signs of revolution in Russia, particularly those associated with the Bolsheviks. Kornilov mobilized his troops to Petrograd to address the revolutionary threat shortly after his appointment as commander in chief.

== The affair ==
The exact specifics of why Kornilov marched on Petrograd are unclear. It is certain that Kornilov had claimed to be working with Kerensky’s approval and to have been trying to arrest the Bolsheviks. It is unlikely that Kerensky would have wanted Kornilov to march on Petrograd, since he had feared a coup from Kornilov. Historian Brian D. Taylor believes there is only weak evidence that Kornilov was unilaterally attempting to impose a military dictatorship, since the only person to claim direct evidence to this effect was the former Provisional Government minister Vladimir Nikolaevich Lvov, whose account was contradicted by three other witnesses.

Convinced that Kornilov was executing a coup, Kerensky sent Kornilov a telegram on 10 September 1917 (O.S. 27 August) informing him of his dismissal and ordering him to return to Petrograd. The telegram did not impede Kornilov's progress toward Petrograd as intended; instead, it most likely hastened his troops' advance, since Kornilov, after reading the message, assumed that Petrograd had fallen under Bolshevik control.

Kornilov had the support of the British military attaché, Brigadier-General Alfred Knox, and Kerensky accused Knox of producing pro-Kornilov propaganda. Kerensky also claimed that Lord Milner had written him a letter expressing support for Kornilov.

Over the next few days, as the Provisional Government attempted to devise a concrete plan to avert the oncoming attack, the Petrograd Soviet took measures to defend against Kornilov's advancing troops. One of these measures was the creation of the Committee for the Struggle Against Counterrevolution on 11 September 1917 (O.S. 28 August). Participants in the committee included representatives of the two national Soviet executive committees of workers and soldiers and of peasants, the Petrograd Soviet, the General Central Council of Trade Unions, and the Social Revolutionary (S.R.) and Menshevik parties. The most notable members of this committee were the Bolsheviks, who had a large support base among the lower classes and included organizers such as Leon Trotsky, who had previously been imprisoned but was released at the behest of the Petrograd Soviet to assist in organizing Petrograd's defense.

The Soviet undertook several actions, such as working with rail workers' unions to impede Kornilov's army's progress toward Petrograd, infiltrating the army for purposes of sabotage, and persuading soldiers to desert—all intended to halt and weaken Kornilov's forces. In Petrograd, the Soviet—most notably the Bolsheviks, for reasons that proved important later on—were given ammunition and arms in case Kornilov's troops arrived and combat became necessary. However, this proved unnecessary, because by 13 September 1917 (O.S. 30 August) Kornilov's army had lost a large number of soldiers, and with no further support for Kornilov's movement, the affair had come to a bloodless end.

== Consequences ==
Kornilov was removed from his position as Commander-in-Chief and incarcerated in the Bykhov Fortress alongside 30 other army officers accused of involvement in the conspiracy. General Aleksandr Krymov commanded the forces that moved toward Petrograd before being stopped. Krymov surrendered and, after meeting with Kerensky, shot himself in the heart.

On 14 September 1917 (O.S. 1 September), the Provisional Government proclaimed the establishment of the Russian Republic, formally abolishing what remained of the old monarchical system and creating a Provisional Council as a temporary parliament in preparation for elections to a Constituent Assembly.

However, the Provisional Government had lost all credibility and soon crumbled. Shortly after Lenin seized power in the Bolshevik October Revolution of 7 November 1917 (O.S. 25 October), Kornilov managed to escape from Bykhov Fortress and went on to establish the Volunteer Army, which fought the Bolsheviks during the Russian Civil War. He was killed in battle against Bolshevik forces in the town of Ekaterinodar in April 1918.

The principal beneficiary of the Kornilov affair was the Bolshevik Party, which experienced a revival in support and strength in the wake of the supposed attempted coup. Kerensky released Bolsheviks who had been arrested during the July Days a few months earlier, when Vladimir Lenin was accused of being in the pay of the Germans and subsequently fled to Finland. Kerensky's appeal to the Petrograd Soviet for support had resulted in the rearmament of the Bolshevik Military Organization and the release of Bolshevik political prisoners, including Leon Trotsky. Although these weapons were not needed to repel Kornilov's advancing troops in August, they were retained by the Bolsheviks and later used in their successful armed October Revolution. Bolshevik support among the Russian public also increased following the Kornilov affair, a consequence of dissatisfaction with the Provisional Government's handling of the attempted seizure of power. After the October Revolution, Lenin and the Bolsheviks seized power and the Provisional Government of which Kornilov had been a part ceased to exist. The remnants of the Provisional Government were a pivotal force in the Russian Civil War that followed Lenin's seizure of power.

Despite the officer corps' refusal to participate in Kornilov's mutiny, they were angered by the punishment Kerensky imposed on him, by Kerensky's accommodation of the left, and by his arrest of prominent generals. This would later come back to haunt Kerensky, as the military did not heed his request to defend the government when the Bolsheviks attacked in the October Revolution of 1917.

== Historiography ==
Several schools of thought surrounding the Kornilov affair offer contrasting interpretations and have provoked debate among historians. Mark D. Steinberg presents the conflicting beliefs and political opinions on the Kornilov affair. He elaborates by stating that the event was "a strange mixture of conspiracy and confusion." Once the attempt was halted, many citizens expressed skepticism regarding what actually happened between Kornilov and Kerensky. On the left, those who defended Kornilov believed that Kerensky had intentionally planned the seizure of power but publicly disapproved of it to appear as a savior in the midst of turmoil. Steinberg also notes that the right believed Kerensky had turned against Kornilov. Thus, opinions regarding this affair further perpetuated the separation between right- and left-wing political factions.

When discussing the events that led up to the affair, Steinberg analyzes the involvement of former Provisional Government minister Vladimir Nikolaevich Lvov. Prior to the affair, Lvov identified himself to Kornilov as an "emissary for the prime minister," which was not his true role. Through his interaction with Kornilov, Lvov learned that Kornilov wanted a stronger, more unified government in which he would have greater influence. Lvov then conveyed these desires to Kerensky, but Kerensky viewed the information as a threatening proposal to seize the government. From there, Kerensky prepared to defend the capital against Kornilov's advancing troops and aspirations of gaining power. It can be argued that, through Lvov's communications, the intentions of both Kornilov and Kerensky were miscommunicated or misrepresented, which helped precipitate the attempted seizure of government power.

One account of the Kornilov affair was put forward by Alexander Kerensky himself. In the years after the event, Kerensky described the affair as a right-wing conspiracy that "...developed slowly, systematically, with cool calculation of all the factors involved affecting its possible success or failure." Kerensky posited that Kornilov had been drawn into this conspiracy long after the preparatory work had been completed. In a 1966 interview with Soviet journalist Genrikh Borovik, Kerensky further asserted that Winston Churchill (then Minister of Munitions in the British government) had played a central role in the conspiracy.

English historian A. J. P. Taylor states in his 1966 book that Kerensky initially encouraged the coup until he realized that Kornilov intended to destroy both Bolsheviks and non-Bolsheviks, including Kerensky himself. The American historian Richard Pipes offered another interpretation in his work The Russian Revolution: 1899–1919 (1990). Pipes argued that, far from there being a Kornilov plot, there was in fact a "Kerensky plot" engineered to discredit the general as the ringleader of an imaginary but widely anticipated counter-revolution, the suppression of which would elevate the prime minister to a position of unrivaled popularity and power, enabling him to meet the growing threat from the Bolsheviks. According to the British historian John Keegan, in his book on World War I, Kornilov was maneuvered by others into attempting the coup, though Keegan does not identify who those others were.

== See also ==
- Bibliography of the Russian Revolution and Civil War
- Outline of the Russian Revolution and Civil War
- Index of articles related to the Russian Revolution and Civil War
- Kapp Putsch (1920)
- Wagner Group rebellion (2023)
- Ivan Zaplatin (commandant of the Tauride Palace and informed the Bolsheviks of the Kornilov troops)
