= Joan of Arc Battalion =

- Bataillon Jeanne d'Arc
- Active: 1937–April 1939
- Country: French Third Republic, Belgium and Switzerland
- Allegiance: (Francoist Spain) Nationalist faction
- Type: Foreign volunteer
- Role: Infantry
- Size: 500 men
- Patron: Saint Joan of Arc
- Engagements: Spanish Civil War

Commanders
- Notable commanders: Paul Lavigne-Delville; Henri Bonneville de Marsangy †

The Joan of Arc Battalion was a military unit which fought on the side of the Nationalists in the Spanish Civil War. It was composed of volunteers from France, Belgium and Switzerland.

== History ==
The Joan of Arc Battalion was formed in 1937 by Paul Lavigne-Delville, a French general and veteran of World War I. The battalion was initially commanded by Captain Henri Bonneville de Marsangy until his death in 1937. Many members of the battalion were members of the Croix-de-Feu, the French Social Party, Action Française, and the French Popular Party.

The Joan of Arc Battalion was a small unit because of the lack of propaganda and recruitment in France and the dispersion of French volunteers into other units.
