= Aleksandr Krymov =

Russian general (1871–1917)

Aleksandr Mikhailovich Krymov
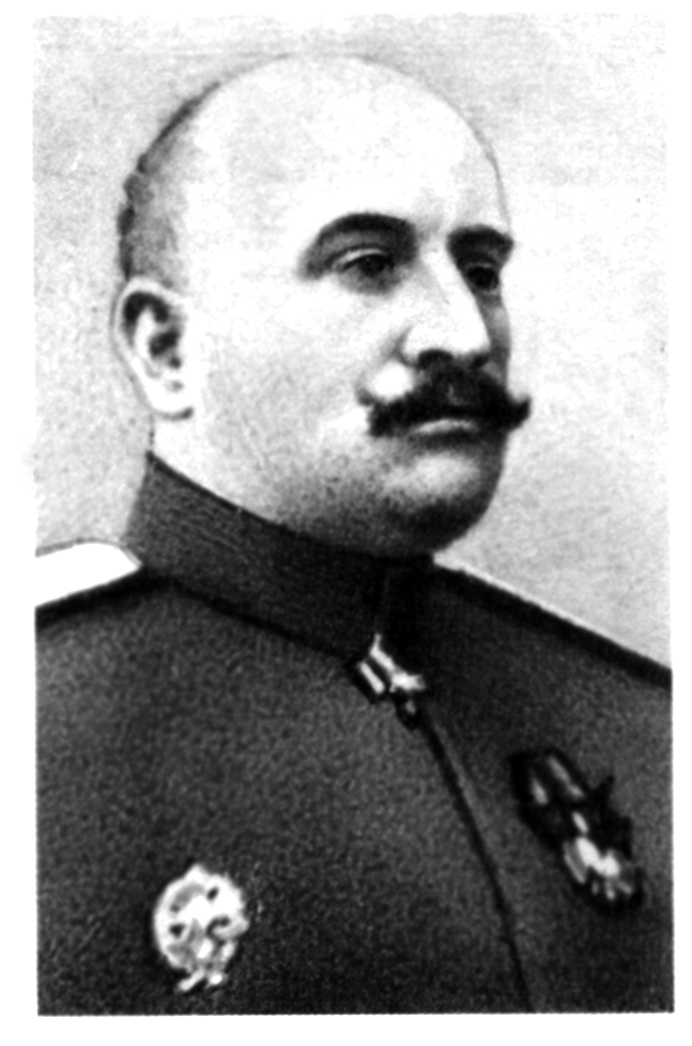
- Alexandr Krymov
- Born: 6 November 1871; Russian Empire
- Died: 13 September 1917 (aged 45); Petrograd, Russian Provisional Government
- Cause of death: Suicide by gunshot
- Military career
- Allegiance: Russian Empire; Russian Republic
- Branch: (Russian Empire) Imperial Russian Army (Russian Republic) White Movement
- Rank: General of the cavalry
- Commands: 3rd Cavalry Corps; Savage Division
- Conflicts: Russo-Japanese War; World War I
- Awards: See awards

Aleksandr Mikhailovich Krymov (Russian: Крымов Александр Михайлович; 6 November [O.S. 25 October] 1871 – 13 September [O.S. 31 August] 1917) was a Russian lieutenant general and military commander of during the Russo-Japanese War, World War I and the Russian Revolution.

On 4 April 1917, he was appointed acting commander of the 3rd Cavalry Corps, which included the Savage Division. He refused to accept the appointment of Military Minister by the Russian Provisional Government. On 24 August 1917, Commander-in-Chief Lavr Kornilov appointed Krymov commander of the detached Petrograd Army (отдельная Петроградская армия) to secure the Russian capital of Petrograd.

== Early life ==
Krymov was part of the nobility of the Warsaw Governorate. Krymov participated in the Russo-Japanese War and World War I.

== Kornilov affair ==
On 25 August 1917, Kornilov's troops were given the order to occupy Petrograd, disperse the Soviet, and disarm the city's garrison in case of a Bolshevik uprising. He was given the order to advance on Petrograd to rescue the Provisional Government from what was believed to be a Bolshevik coup. On 29 August, Kerensky made himself commander-in-chief, and ordered Krymov via cable to halt the advance of his troops, some of whom were moving through the southern suburbs of Petrograd. The Soviet executive in the capital now decided to support the now 'Revolutionary Dictator' Kerensky on news of the advance of Krymov's soldiers, and his troops were 'harangued' by Bolsheviks.

Krymov and his staff, travelling on the train of the 1st Don Cossack Division, were halted at Luga by the railway workers, and they continued to be harangued by Soviet deputies. Powerless, Krymov could only watch in his train compartment as Cossacks in large numbers defected to the Soviet side. On 30 August, he agreed to travel with a government representative to Petrograd, and on 31 August, he met with Kerensky, where he tried to explain that he had only brought his troops in an attempt to defend the government, but Kerensky ordered him to trial by military court.

=== Death ===
Despondent after the meeting with Kerensky, Krymov left for a friend's apartment, where he was heard saying: "The last card for saving the Fatherland has been beaten – life is no longer worth living." He retired to a private room where he wrote a short note to Kornilov, before he shot himself through the heart.

== Honours and awards ==
- Order of St. Stanislaus, 3rd class (1898), 2nd class with Swords (1905)
- Order of St. Vladimir, 4th class with Swords (1905), 3rd class (19 April 1911)
- Order of St. Anne, 4th class (1905), 3rd class with Swords and Bow (1905), 2nd class with Swords (1906)
- Order of St. George, 4th class (26 June 1916)
- Gold Sword for Bravery (8 November 1914)

== Bibliography ==
- Figes, Orlando (2014). A People's Tragedy: The Russian Revolution 1891–1924. London: The Bodley Head. ISBN 9781847922915.
- Krymov's biography (in Russian)
