= Russian Army (1917) =

Russian Army Русская Армiя Русская армия
- Seal of the Provisional Government
- Active: 1917–1918 (Note: The Bolsheviks took control of its headquarters in December 1917 and began efforts to demobilize the army, but the war and the demobilization was not formally complete until the Brest-Litovsk Treaty was signed in March 1918.)
- Country: (Russia) Provisional Government (March–September 1917); Russian Republic (September 1917–January 1918); Russian SFSR (Note: The Bolsheviks' Nikolai Krylenko was the supreme commander of the old army until March 1918.) (January–March 1918)
- Size: 7,060,700 (April 1917)
- Part of: Ministry of War
- Supreme Headquarters: Mogilev, Minsk Governorate; Petrograd, Petrograd Governorate
- Engagements: World War I: Kerensky offensive; Romanian campaign; Riga offensive; Operation Faustschlag

Commanders
- Supreme Commander-in-Chief: Mikhail Alekseyev; Aleksei Brusilov; Lavr Kornilov; Alexander Kerensky; Nikolay Dukhonin; Nikolai Krylenko

In March [O.S. February] 1917, the Russian Army ceased to be the Imperial Russian Army when Emperor Nicholas II abdicated and the Provisional Government became the governing authority. It was officially a caretaker government until September 1917, when the Russian Republic was proclaimed. The army started to be referred to as the Revolutionary Army of Free Russia by the Provisional Government.

The Provisional Government shared power with the Petrograd Soviet, which issued Order No. 1 to the military garrison of Petrograd. When it reached the front lines it was misinterpreted to mean that soldiers no longer had to follow orders from officers and could elect their own commanders. The Soviet later clarified that military discipline had to be maintained, but the order began a decline in discipline and army effectiveness over the course of 1917. Still, the army remained intact and the majority of troops stayed at the front lines, with rear-echelon units in the Russian interior being more affected by revolutionary sentiment.

Order No. 1 changed the relationship between officer corps and the ordinary soldiers, with the cooperation of elected soldiers' committees becoming necessary for army operations. The Russian Army was still capable of launching an offensive in July [O.S. June] 1917, though it was defeated and reversed despite some initial success. The Provisional Government had promised to continue Russia's obligations to its Western allies in the Triple Entente. After the failure of the offensive, and despite the political machinations in Petrograd, the army was still an effective force at the front, though it was unwilling to go on the attack.

The Bolsheviks began taking control of the army in November 1917, after the October Revolution, and abolished the officer corps in December 1917. This began the process of disintegration, but the army did not cease existing at the front until February 1918, when negotiations between Germany and the Bolsheviks broke down. The Germans did not start transferring divisions from the Eastern Front to the west until the Bolsheviks agreed to an armistice in late 1917. The Bolsheviks still wanted to maintain the Russian Army at the front while talks with Germany were ongoing, and the army was formally demobilized when the Treaty of Brest-Litovsk was signed in March 1918.

== Democratization ==
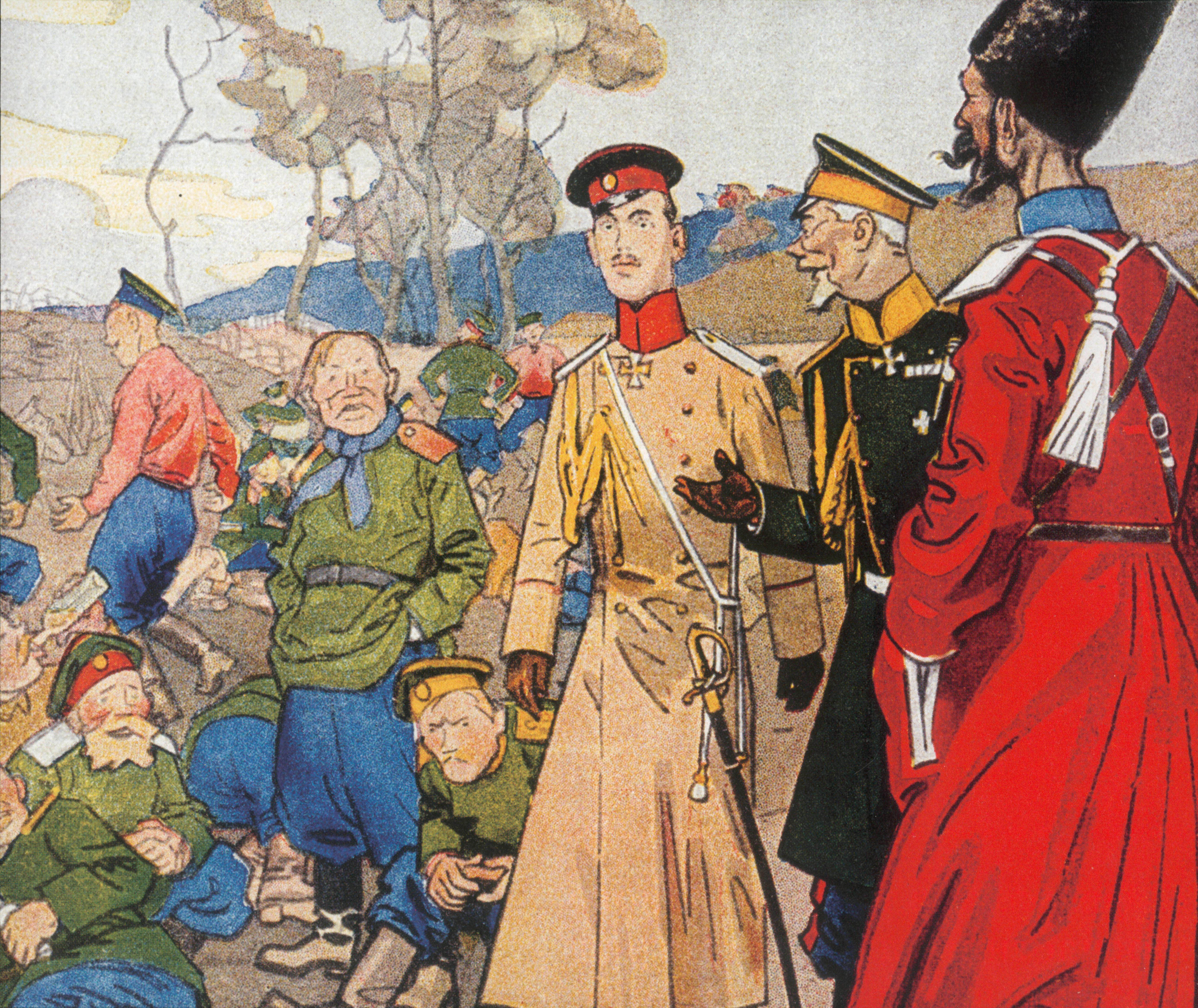
A German caricature of 1917. The caption says: "You are safe, Michael Alexandrovich": the Army is on strike today!

The revolutionary wave influenced the Army, and it was swept with the processes of democratization and the single line of command was questioned. The Order No. 1 issued by the Petrograd Soviet instructed soldiers and sailors to obey their officers and the Provisional Government only if their orders did not contradict the decrees of the Petrograd Soviet. The interpretation of the Order, both at the time and by the historians has been a matter of controversy. While many scholars agree that the order severely disrupted the army discipline, John Boyd argued that in fact, the order's intention was to restore the discipline and it clearly stated that it was to be applied only to the troops off the front lines. While the order did not call for the democratic election of the officers, it has been a widespread misinterpretation.

After Alexander Kerensky became the Minister of War and Navy in the Provisional Government in April 1917, he instituted the Declaration of Soldiers' Rights within the military and appointed commissars. Kerensky's Declaration was modified to prevent soldiers' committees from electing officers and attempted to maintain the authority of officers by giving them control over military operations, training, and supply. Every field army and front in the army had one commissar each from the Provisional Government, the Petrograd Soviet, and the soldiers' committee appointed to the command staff. The commissars were able to monitor the army commander and his staff, countersign orders, and to recommend that officers be removed from their post. The Petrograd Soviet did not actively work with its commissars, and the responsibility for overseeing them belonged to Kerensky and a new Political Section at the Ministry of War.

== Bibliography ==
- Boyd, John (1967). "The Origins of Order No. 1". Soviet Studies. 19 (3): 359–372. doi:10.1080/09668136808410599.
- Reese, Roger R. (2019). The Imperial Russian Army in Peace, War, and Revolution, 1856–1917. Lawrence: University Press of Kansas. ISBN 978-0-7006-2860-5.
- Stevenson, David (2017). 1917: War, Peace, and Revolution. Oxford: Oxford University Press. ISBN 978-0-19-100676-0.
- Ziemke, Earl F. (2004). The Red Army, 1918–1941: From Vanguard of World Revolution to America's Ally. Taylor & Francis. ISBN 978-1-135-76918-5.
- Wildman, Allan (1987). The End of the Russian Imperial Army: The Road to Soviet Power and Peace. Vol. II. Princeton: Princeton University Press. ISBN 0-691-05504-1.
