= Outline of the Russian Republic =

Overview of and topical guide to the Russian Republic

The following outline is provided as an overview of and topical guide to the Russian Republic:

The Russian Republic (Note: Russian: Российская Республика, romanized: Rossiyskaya Respublika, IPA: [rɐˈsʲijskəjə rʲɪsˈpublʲɪkə].) (Note: Known also as the Russian Democratic Federative Republic in the 1918 Constitution (Russian: Российская Демократическая Федеративная Республика, romanized: Rossiyskaya Demokraticheskaya Federativnaya Respublika).) was the short-lived Russian state that de jure controlled the territory of the former Russian Empire after its proclamation by the Russian Provisional Government on 14 September (N.S.; 1 September O.S.) 1917 in a decree signed by Alexander Kerensky as Minister-Chairman and Alexander Zarudny as Minister of Justice. The government of the Russian Republic was dissolved after the Bolsheviks seized power by force in the October Revolution on 7 November 1917.

== Overviews ==
- Russian Republic (14 September [O.S. 1 September] 1917 – 25 January 1918) – successor state to the Russian Empire, proclaimed by the Provisional Government and superseded by the Russian SFSR in January 1918.
- Russian Revolution - Revolutionary period in Russia from 1905 to 1917, comprising three main events: the Russian Revolution of 1905, the February Revolution, and the October revolution.
- Russian Civil War - Civil war which followed the revolution.

== Background ==
- February Revolution
- World War I

== Events ==
- Abdication of Nicholas II
- February Revolution
- Grimm–Hoffmann affair
- July Days
- Kerensky offensive
- Kerensky–Krasnov uprising
- Kornilov affair
- Polubotkivtsi uprising
- Russian Civil War
- Tarnopol offensive

=== Elections ===
- 1917 Russian Constituent Assembly election
- Results of the 1917 Russian Constituent Assembly election

== People ==
=== Political leaders ===
- List of members of the Russian Constituent Assembly
- Georgy Lvov
- Alexander Zarudny
- Alexander Kerensky
- Viktor Chernov
- Vladimir Lenin
- Nicholas II of Russia
- Ibniyamin Akhtyamov
- Andrei Argunov
- Alexander Dutov
- Egor Lazarev
- Ivan Maisky
- Boris Sokoloff
- Vladimir Volsky
- Vladimir Zenzinov
- Mikhail Alekseyev
- Maria Bochkareva
- Alexander Halpern
- Ivan Krivonogov
- Petr Levanidov
- Maria Skrydlova
- Nikolai Avksentiev
- Aleksandr Bublikov
- Alexander Guchkov
- Anton Kartashev
- Nikolai Kishkin
- Aleksandr Konovalov (politician)
- Vladimir Nikolaevich Lvov
- Pavel Malyantovich
- Alexander Manuilov
- Pavel Milyukov
- Nikolai Vissarionovich Nekrasov
- Alexey Nikitin (politician)
- Sergey Oldenburg
- Sofia Panina
- Alexey Peshekhonov
- Sergei Prokopovich
- Sergei Salazkin
- Dmitry Shakhovskoy
- Andrei Shingarev
- Matvey Skobelev
- Mikhail Tereshchenko
- Irakli Tsereteli
- Dmitry Verderevsky

=== Military leaders ===
- Lavr Kornilov
- Žanis Bahs
- Fyodor Bakunin
- Mikhail Batorsky
- Mikhail Berens
- Constantin Bivol
- Ieremia Cecan
- Oskars Dankers
- Mikhail Drozdovsky
- Mikhail Fostikov
- Vilis Janums
- Timofey Kirpichnikov
- August Kork
- Petr G. Kravtsov
- Aleksey Kuropatkin
- Fedor Linde
- Pyotr Malyshev
- Mārtiņš Peniķis
- Ivan Polyakov
- Iosif Popov
- Max Reyter
- Mikhail Timofeyevich Romanov
- Nikolai Skoblin
- Alexey Skulachenko
- Piotr Skuratowicz
- Teodors Spāde
- Yakov Tryapitsyn
- Roman von Ungern-Sternberg
- Mikhail Bakhirev
- Ivan Grigorovich
- Vasily Kanin
- Mikhail Kedrov (admiral)
- Alexander Kolchak
- Nikolai Kolomeitsev
- Adrian Nepenin
- Dmitry Verderevsky
- Aleksandr Verkhovsky
- Yakov Bagratuni
- Pyotr Baluyev
- Mikhail Bonch-Bruyevich (commander)
- Aleksei Brusilov
- Yuri Danilov
- Nikolai Dukhonin
- Alexander V. Golubintzev
- Vasily Gurko
- Aleksei Gutor
- Vladislav Klembovsky
- Pyotr Krasnov
- Aleksandr Krymov
- Alexander Lukomsky
- Carl Gustaf Emil Mannerheim
- Vladimir Smirnov (general)
- Pyotr Wrangel
- Nikolai Yudenich

== Organizations ==
=== Governing bodies ===
- All-Russian Congress of Soviets
- Autonomous Governorate of Estonia
- Central Council of Ukraine
- Committee of Members of the Constituent Assembly
- Constituent Assembly
- Directorate (Russia)
- Petrograd Soviet
- Provisional All-Russian Government
- Provisional Council of the Russian Republic
- Provisional Committee of the State Duma
- Russian Constituent Assembly
- Russian Provisional Government
- Russian SFSR
- Russian Soviet Republic
- Russian State (1918–1920)

=== Political parties ===
- Bolsheviks
- Moldavian Progressive Party

=== Military ===
- Women's Battalion
- 1st Polish Corps in Russia
- Battalions of Death
- People's Army of Komuch

== Places ==
- Petrograd
- Mariinsky Palace
- Tauride Palace
- Winter Palace

== Decrees and documents ==
- Decree on the system of government of Russia (1918)
- 1918 RSFSR Constitution

== Aftermath ==
- October Revolution
- Russian Civil War

== Culture and society ==
- Worker's Marseillaise

== Miscellaneous ==
- Jailbirds of Kerensky
- Kerenka
- Milyukov note
- Vikzhel negotiations
- Moscow State Conference
- Special Transcaucasian Committee

== Bibliography ==
- Smith, S. A. (2017). Russia in Revolution: An Empire in Crisis, 1890 to 1928. New York: Oxford University Press.
- Engelstein, L. (2017). Russia in Flames: War, Revolution, Civil War, 1914–1921. New York: Oxford University Press.
- Figes, O. (1996). A People's Tragedy: A History of the Russian Revolution. New York: Viking.
- McMeekin, S. (2017). The Russian Revolution: A New History. New York: Basic Books.
- Smele, J. (2016). The "Russian" Civil Wars, 1916–1926: Ten Years That Shook the World. New York: Oxford University Press. (Note: Contains a 46-page bibliography of English and non-English works on the "Russian" Civil Wars.)

Additional sources

- Browder, R. P., & Kerensky, A. F. (Eds.). (1961). The Russian Provisional Government, 1917: Documents (Vols. 1–3). Stanford University Press.
- Editors of Encyclopaedia Britannica. (2026a, August 5). Russian Provisional Government. In Encyclopædia Britannica.
- Radkey, O. H. (1990). Russia goes to the polls: The election to the All-Russian Constituent Assembly, 1917. Cornell University Press.
- Rosenberg, W. G. (1974). Liberals in the Russian Revolution: The Constitutional Democratic Party, 1917–1921. Princeton University Press.
- Sablin, I. (2021). The democratic conference and the pre-parliament in Russia, 1917: Class, nationality, and the building of a postimperial community. Nationalities Papers, 51(2), 446–468. doi:10.1017/nps.2021.73
- Wade, R. A. (2017). The Russian Revolution, 1917 (3rd ed.). Cambridge University Press. doi:10.1017/9781316417898

== See also ==
- Category:Russian Republic
- Index of articles related to the Russian Revolution and Civil War
