= Outline of the February Revolution =

Overview of and topical guide to the 1917 February Revolution in Russia

February Revolution
- Part of the Russian Revolution and the Revolutions of 1917–1923
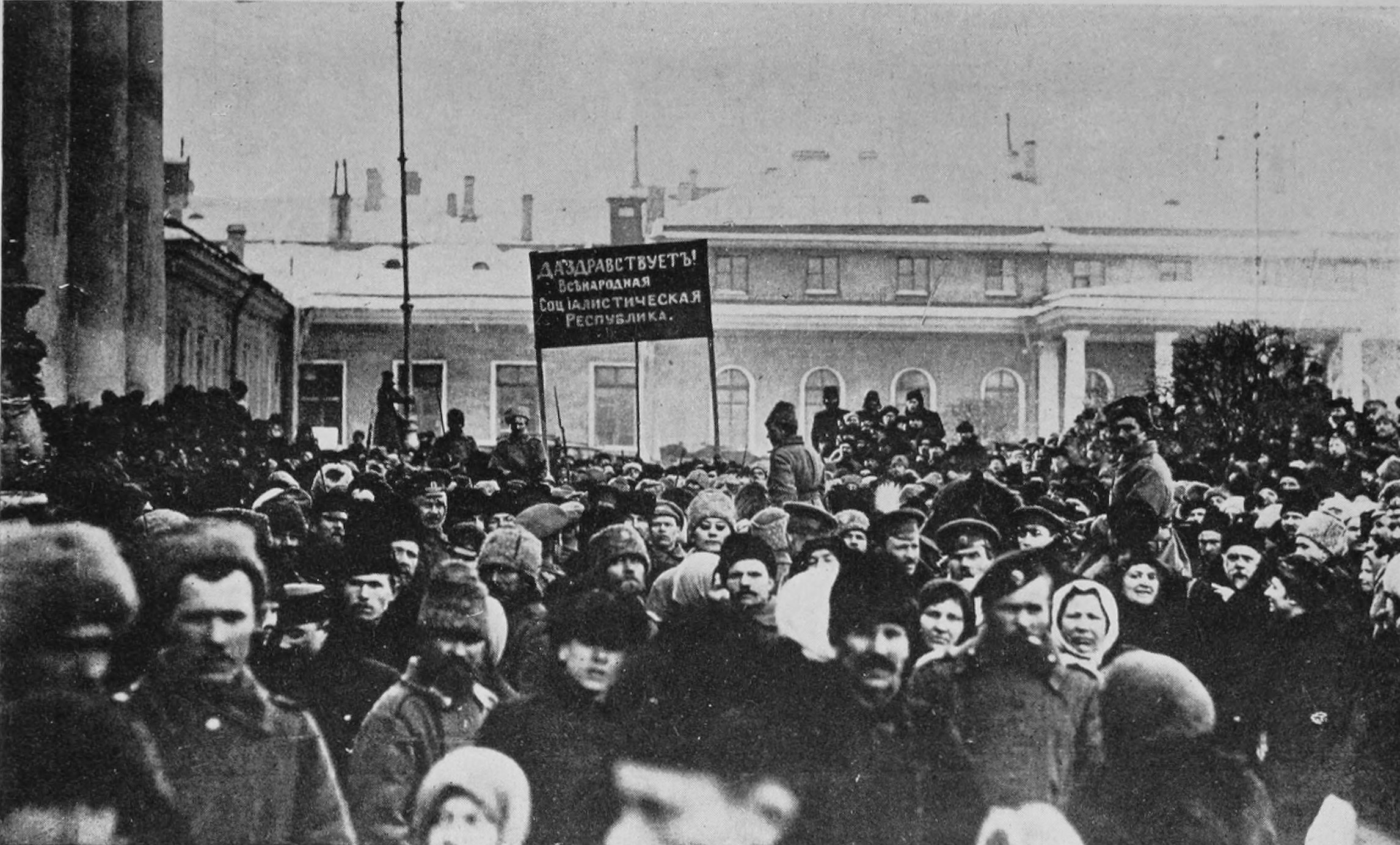
- Protests in Petrograd, March 1917
Date	23 February – 3 March 1917 O.S. [8–16 March N.S.]
Location	Petrograd, Russian Empire
Result	Revolutionary victory; End of the monarchy; Period of dual power between the Provisional Government and the Petrograd Soviet; Proclamation of the Republic; October Revolution and start of the Russian Civil War

The following outline is provided as an overview of and topical guide to the February Revolution in Russia.

The February Revolution (Russian: Февральская революция), known in Soviet historiography as the February Bourgeois Democratic Revolution, was the first of two revolutions in Russia in 1917. (Note: At the time of the February Revolution, Russia was still using the Old Style (O.S.) Julian calendar. The revolution ran from 23 February to 3 March 1917 O.S., which in the New Style (N.S.) Gregorian calendar was 8–16 March 1917; Nicholas II's abdication, dated 2 March O.S., fell on 15 March N.S. Russian dates remained thirteen days behind Western ones until February 1918, when the Bolshevik government adopted the Gregorian calendar.) Its main events unfolded in and around Petrograd (now Saint Petersburg), then the Russian capital, where long-standing discontent with the monarchy erupted into mass protests over food shortages and rationing.

The revolution lasted a little over a week and was marked by mass demonstrations and violent clashes with the police. On 27 February O.S. [12 March N.S.], most of the capital's garrison went over to the revolutionaries, and Duma members formed the Provisional Committee of the State Duma to fill the vacuum left by the collapsing imperial government. The committee seized the railway telegraph and issued orders announcing that the Duma had taken control, followed by a second telegram barring trains from approaching Petrograd, which prevented troops loyal to the Tsar from arriving by rail. Three days later Nicholas II, stranded aboard his train at Pskov after failing to reach the capital, was forced to abdicate, ending Romanov dynastic rule. That same day the committee, acting together with the Petrograd Soviet, established the Russian Provisional Government under Georgy Lvov, which replaced the Council of Ministers.

== Overview ==
- February Revolution – overview of the 1917 February Revolution in Russia.
- Russian Republic – the state proclaimed by the Provisional Government on 1 September 1917 O.S. [14 September N.S.].
- Russian Revolution – the revolutionary period of 1917, comprising the February Revolution and the October Revolution.
- Dual power – the period in which authority in Russia was split between the Russian Provisional Government and the Petrograd Soviet.

== Background ==
- World War I – major armed conflict between the Allied Powers and the Central Powers. (Note: The principal Allied Powers were the French Third Republic, the British Empire, the Russian Empire, the Kingdom of Italy, the Empire of Japan and the United States. The main Central Powers were the German Empire, Austria-Hungary and the Ottoman Empire.) Russia suffered social upheaval during the war, followed by a political and military collapse in 1917 that led to the abdication of Nicholas II and the revolution.
- Eastern Front (World War I) – the Russian theater of World War I.
- 1905 Russian Revolution – wave of political and social unrest that preceded the revolutions of 1917. (Note: See Outline and timeline of the Russian Revolution of 1905 for additional information.)

== Events ==
- 1917 Kronstadt Mutiny – 28 February 1917 O.S. [13 March N.S.] – a revolt of sailors stationed at the Kronstadt Naval Base.
- Abdication of Nicholas II – 2 March 1917 O.S. [15 March N.S.] – Nicholas II renounces the throne while stranded aboard his train at Pskov.
- Grimm–Hoffmann affair – 1917 scandal over a Swiss-brokered approach to a separate peace with Germany.
- International Women's Day Protests – 23 February 1917 O.S. [8 March N.S.] – women's demonstration and bread riot in Petrograd in opposition to government food rationing.
- Kerensky offensive – the last Russian offensive of the war, launched in Galicia in the summer of 1917.
- Kornilov affair – the attempted military move on Petrograd in August 1917.
- Moscow State Conference – all-Russian political forum convened by the government in Moscow in August 1917.
- Polubotkivtsi uprising – July 1917 rising of Ukrainian soldiers in Kiev.
- Putilov strike of 1917 – 18 February 1917 O.S. [3 March N.S.] – a workers' strike at the Putilov Works in Petrograd.
- Tarnopol offensive – the Central Powers' counterstroke of July 1917, which broke the Russian front in Galicia.
- Vikzhel negotiations – railway union talks on a coalition socialist government after the October Revolution.

== People ==
=== Imperial government ===
==== Imperial family ====
- Nicholas II of Russia – (1868–1918) – Emperor of Russia from 1894 until his abdication in 1917; executed by the Bolsheviks at Yekaterinburg.
- Alexandra Feodorovna (Alix of Hesse) – (1872–1918) – born Princess Alix of Hesse and by Rhine; wife of Nicholas II and deeply unpopular in Russia. Executed with her husband and children in 1918.
- Grand Duke Kirill Vladimirovich of Russia – (1876–1938) – grand duke who brought the Guards Equipage to the Tauride Palace in support of the Duma.
- Grand Duke Paul Alexandrovich of Russia – (1860–1919) – grand duke who drafted a manifesto proposing a constitutional monarchy.

==== Ministers of the imperial government ====
- Mikhail Belyayev – (1863–1918) – last Minister of War.
- Nikolai Golitsyn – (1850–1925) – last chairman of the Council of Ministers of the Russian Empire.
- Ivan Grigorovich – (1853–1930) – last Naval Minister.
- Nikolai Pokrovsky – (1865–1930) – last Minister of Foreign Affairs.
- Alexander Protopopov – (1866–1918) – last Minister of the Interior.

=== Military ===
==== Army ====
- Mikhail Alekseyev – (1857–1918) – Chief of Staff at headquarters, who canvassed the front commanders on the abdication.
- Yakov Bagratuni – (1879–1943) – chief of staff of the Petrograd Military District.
- Mikhail Bonch-Bruyevich – (1870–1956) – commander of the Pskov garrison, later a Red Army staff officer.
- Aleksei Brusilov – (1853–1926) – Supreme Commander-in-Chief, May to July 1917.
- Yuri Danilov – (1866–1937) – Northern Front staff officer, present at Pskov for the abdication.
- Anton Denikin – (1872–1947) – chief of staff at headquarters, afterwards a White commander.
- Nikolai Dukhonin – (1876–1917) – last Supreme Commander-in-Chief, lynched by soldiers.
- Aleksei Evert – (1857–1926) – Western Front commander, who advised Nicholas II to abdicate.
- Vasily Gurko – (1864–1937) – acting Chief of Staff in 1916–1917, then a front commander.
- Nikolai Ivanov – (1851–1919) – sent with troops to restore order in Petrograd, but halted short of the capital.
- Aleksey Kaledin – (1861–1918) – elected ataman of the Don Cossacks in 1917.
- Sergey Khabalov – (1858–1924) – head of the Petrograd Military District.
- Vladislav Klembovsky – (1860–1921) – Northern Front commander, offered the supreme command during the Kornilov affair.
- Lavr Kornilov – (1870–1918) – commander of the Petrograd Military District, then Supreme Commander-in-Chief.
- Pyotr Krasnov – (1869–1947) – Cossack general who led the march on Petrograd with Kerensky in October 1917.
- Aleksandr Krymov – (1871–1917) – moved troops on Petrograd in the Kornilov affair and shot himself when it failed.
- Alexander Lukomsky – (1868–1939) – quartermaster-general and chief of staff at headquarters, arrested with Kornilov.
- Peter Polovtsov – (1874–1964) – lieutenant general of the 1917 army.
- Nikolai Ruzsky – (1854–1918) – Northern Front commander, who argued for abdication at Pskov.
- Vladimir Sakharov – (1853–1920) – Romanian Front commander.

==== Navy ====
- Mikhail Kedrov – (1878–1945) – rear admiral over the Black Sea Fleet battleship squadron.
- Alexander Kolchak – (1874–1920) – commander of the Black Sea Fleet, later leader of the White movement.
- Adrian Nepenin – (1871–1917) – commander of the Baltic Fleet, killed by sailors at Helsinki.

==== Soldiers ====
- Maria Bochkareva – (1889–1920) – raised the 1st Russian Women's Battalion of Death.
- Timofey Kirpichnikov – (1892–1917/1918) – non-commissioned officer of the Volhynian Life Guards Regiment who began the mutiny of the Petrograd garrison.
- Maria Skrydlova – (1898–1940) – adjutant of the 1st Russian Women's Battalion of Death.

=== State Duma ===
- Vladimir Purishkevich – (1870–1920) – far-right deputy and one of Grigori Rasputin's assassins.
- Mikhail Rodzianko – (1859–1924) – Duma chairman who headed the Provisional Committee of the State Duma and urged the Tsar to abdicate.
- Vasily Shulgin – (1878–1976) – nationalist deputy who, with Alexander Guchkov, received the Tsar's abdication at Pskov.

=== Petrograd Soviet and socialist parties ===
- Boris Bogdanov – (1884–1960) – Menshevik who opposed the Bolsheviks after October.
- Fyodor Kolesov – (1891–1940) – revolutionary who headed Soviet power in Turkestan.
- Fedor Linde – (1881–1917) – revolutionary who brought troops onto the streets against the Milyukov note.
- Yuri Steklov – (1873–1941) – Soviet executive committee member and editor of Izvestia.
- Nikolai Sukhanov – (1882–1940) – Soviet executive committee member.

=== Provisional Government ===
==== Leaders ====
- Georgy Lvov – (1861–1925) – Zemstvo leader and first head of the Provisional Government, resigned in July 1917.
- Alexander Kerensky – (1881–1970) – socialist minister who became Minister-Chairman; lived in California after the Civil War, and died in exile in New York city.

==== Ministers ====
- Nikolai Avksentiev – (1878–1943) – Socialist Revolutionary, Minister of the Interior and chairman of the Provisional Council of the Russian Republic.
- Viktor Chernov – (1873–1952) – Socialist Revolutionary leader and Minister of Agriculture.
- Alexander Guchkov – (1862–1936) – Octobrist leader who took the abdication from Nicholas II and became Minister of War and Navy.
- Anton Kartashev – (1875–1960) – last Over-Procurator of the Holy Synod, then Minister of Religion.
- Nikolai Kishkin – (1864–1930) – Kadet, Minister of Public Charities.
- Aleksandr Konovalov – (1875–1949) – Minister of Trade and Industry and deputy premier in the last cabinet.
- Vladimir Nikolaevich Lvov – (1872–1930) – Over-Procurator of the Holy Synod, whose messages between Alexander Kerensky and Lavr Kornilov set off the Kornilov affair.
- Pavel Malyantovich – (1869–1940) – Menshevik and the last Minister of Justice.
- Alexander Manuilov – (1861–1929) – Minister of Education in the first cabinet.
- Pavel Milyukov – (1859–1943) – Kadet leader and Minister of Foreign Affairs, forced out over the Milyukov note.
- Nikolai Vissarionovich Nekrasov – (1879–1940) – Kadet, Minister of Transport, later deputy premier and Minister of Finance.
- Alexey Nikitin – (1876–1939) – Menshevik, Minister of Post and Telegraph and afterwards of the Interior.
- Sergey Oldenburg – (1863–1934) – Minister of Education in the second coalition.
- Sofia Panina – (1871–1956) – deputy Minister of State Welfare and deputy Minister of Education.
- Alexey Peshekhonov – (1867–1933) – Popular Socialist and Minister of Food.
- Sergei Prokopovich – (1871–1955) – Minister of Trade and Industry and then of Food.
- Fedor Rodichev – (1854–1933) – Kadet leader and acting minister for Finnish affairs.
- Sergei Salazkin – (1862–1932) – last Minister of Education.
- Dmitry Shakhovskoy – (1861–1939) – Kadet, Minister of Social Welfare from May to July 1917.
- Andrei Shingarev – (1869–1918) – Kadet, Minister of Agriculture and then of Finance, killed in Petrograd in 1918.
- Matvey Skobelev – (1885–1938) – Menshevik and Minister of Labour.
- Mikhail Tereshchenko – (1886–1956) – Minister of Finance and then of Foreign Affairs.
- Irakli Tsereteli – (1881–1959) – Menshevik leader, Minister of Post and Telegraph and briefly of the Interior.
- Dmitry Verderevsky – (1873–1947) – admiral and the last Minister of the Navy.
- Aleksandr Verkhovsky – (1886–1938) – Minister of War in the last cabinet.
- Alexander Zarudny – (1863–1934) – Popular Socialist and Minister of Justice.

==== Commissars and officials ====
- Aleksandr Bublikov – (1875–1941) – Duma commissar for the railways, whose telegrams announced the Duma's authority and barred trains from Petrograd.
- Alexander Halpern – (1879–1956) – managed the affairs of the government from February to October 1917.
- Ivan Krivonogov – (1866–1918) – Duma deputy for Arkhangelsk who became a government commissar.
- Petr Levanidov – (1864–1937) – Arkhangelsk deputy in the Fourth Duma, appointed a commissar in 1917.

=== Russian Orthodox Church ===
- Vladimir Bogoyavlensky – (1848–1918) – Metropolitan of Kiev and senior member of the Holy Synod, murdered in 1918.
- Patriarch Tikhon of Moscow – (1865–1925) – Metropolitan of Moscow and, from November 1917, the first patriarch since 1700.
- Joachim (Levitsky) – (1853–c. 1921) – Archbishop of Nizhny Novgorod, briefly imprisoned by the Provisional Government for his monarchism.
- Macarius Nevsky – (1835–1926) – Metropolitan of Moscow, removed from his see after the revolution.
- Arsenius Stadnitsky – (1862–1936) – Archbishop of Novgorod and a leading figure of the church council of 1917–1918.
- Patriarch Sergius of Moscow – (1867–1944) – bishop of the Holy Synod reconstituted in 1917; Patriarch of Moscow from 1943.

== Places ==
- Petrograd – the Russian capital, known as Saint Petersburg before 1914 and again from 1991.
- Kronstadt – a Russian port city and naval base in the Kronshtadtsky District of Saint Petersburg, on Kotlin Island.
- Field of Mars – Petrograd parade ground where those killed in the revolution were buried.
- Tauride Palace – seat of the State Duma and, from February 1917, of the Provisional Committee and the Petrograd Soviet alike.
- Vosstaniya Square – Petrograd square, then Znamenskaya Square, where crowds and police clashed during the revolution.
- Pskov – city where Nicholas II signed his abdication and where the Provisional Government was first based.
- Malachite Room of the Winter Palace – the room of the Winter Palace where the government met in its final months.
- Mariinsky Palace – Petrograd palace that housed the government before it moved to the Winter Palace.
- Winter Palace – the government's seat from July 1917 and the place of its arrest that October.

== Organizations ==
=== Government and representative bodies ===
- Council of Ministers of the Russian Empire – the highest executive authority of the empire from 1905 until the monarchy fell.
- Directorate – five-member body that governed Russia in September 1917 between coalition cabinets.
- Petrograd Soviet – council of workers' and soldiers' deputies formed in Petrograd in February 1917, and a key revolutionary body alongside the Provisional Government.
- Provisional Committee of the State Duma – body formed by Duma members on 27 February 1917 O.S. [12 March N.S.] as the imperial government collapsed.
- Provisional Council of the Russian Republic – the Pre-Parliament, an advisory assembly that sat from October 1917.
- Russian Constituent Assembly – assembly elected in late 1917 to settle Russia's form of government and dissolved by the Bolsheviks in January 1918.
- Russian Provisional Government – provisional government of the Russian Empire and later the Russian Republic, which took control on 2 March 1917 O.S. [15 March N.S.] after the abdication of the Tsar.
- Russian Republic – the state proclaimed by the Provisional Government on 1 September 1917 O.S. [14 September N.S.].
- Special Transcaucasian Committee – the government's governing committee for Transcaucasia in 1917.

=== Soviets, committees, and the Soviet press ===
- All-Russian Conference of the Soviets – the first all-Russian meeting of delegates from the soviets of workers' and soldiers' deputies, held in 1917.
- Central Committee of the Baltic Fleet – Tsentrobalt, the coordinating body of the Baltic Fleet sailors' committees, established in April 1917 O.S. [May N.S.].
- Ispolkom – executive committee; in 1917 the usual term for the executive organ of the Petrograd Soviet and of soviets elsewhere.
- Izvestia – newspaper founded in Petrograd in 1917 as the organ of the Petrograd Soviet.
- Petrograd Soviet Order No. 1 – decree of 1 March 1917 O.S. [14 March N.S.] placing units of the garrison under elected soldiers' committees.

=== Party organizations ===
- Progressive Bloc – alliance of Duma factions formed in 1915 that pressed for a ministry enjoying public confidence.
- Union of the Russian People – far-right monarchist party that collapsed with the monarchy in 1917.
- Zemgor – wartime relief committee of the zemstvos and town unions, first chaired by Georgy Lvov.

=== Military units and formations ===
- Imperial Russian Army – the army of the Russian Empire.
- Imperial Russian Navy - the navy of the Russian Empire.
- Moscow Life Guards Regiment – guards infantry regiment whose reserve battalion went over to the revolution.
- Pavlovsky Life Guards Regiment – guards infantry regiment whose reserve battalion fired on police on 26 February 1917 O.S. [11 March N.S.].
- Petersburg Military District – the military district covering the capital and its garrison.
- Preobrazhensky Life Guards Regiment – senior guards infantry regiment whose reserve battalion joined the rising.
- Russian Army (1917) – the name the army took after the abdication, when it ceased to be the Imperial Russian Army.
- Semyonovsky Life Guards Regiment – guards infantry regiment of the Petrograd garrison that came over in February 1917.
- Volhynian Life Guards Regiment – guards infantry regiment whose training detachment mutinied on 27 February 1917 O.S. [12 March N.S.].
- Women's Battalion – all-female combat units raised in 1917, one of which was present at the defense of the Winter Palace.

== Miscellaneous ==
- Anthem of Free Russia – anthem written in 1917 and proposed for the Russian Republic.
- History of the Russian Republic – the history of the state proclaimed in September 1917 and overthrown that October.
- Jailbirds of Kerensky – nickname for the criminals freed under the amnesty of March 1917.
- Kerenka – the banknotes issued by the Provisional Government.
- Milyukov note – the April 1917 note on Russia's war aims, which brought down the first cabinet.

== Bibliography ==
- Bibliography of the Russian Revolution and Civil War § February

The works below all cover the February Revolution and carry extensive bibliographies for further research.

- Smith, S. A. (2017). Russia in Revolution: An Empire in Crisis, 1890 to 1928. New York: Oxford University Press.
- Engelstein, L. (2017). Russia in Flames: War, Revolution, Civil War, 1914–1921. New York: Oxford University Press.
- Figes, O. (1996). A People's Tragedy: A History of the Russian Revolution. New York: Viking.
- McMeekin, S. (2017). The Russian Revolution: A New History. New York: Basic Books.
- Smele, J. (2016). The "Russian" Civil Wars, 1916–1926: Ten Years That Shook the World. New York: Oxford University Press. (Note: Contains an extensive 46-page bibliography of English and non-English works on the "Russian" Civil Wars.)

== See also ==
- Category:February Revolution
- Index of articles related to the Russian Revolution and Civil War
