= History of the Russian Republic =

The flag used from 1917 to 1918

The Russian Republic was a short-lived state which replaced the Russian Empire and ruled over the territory left after the collapse of the monarchy and abdication of Emperor Nicholas II. Proclaimed in March 1917, it was shortly dissolved after the Bolsheviks took over power, which then established Russian SFSR in January 1918. The following is a brief history of the Republic, which goes over the establishment of the Republic followed by the seize of power.

== History ==
=== Background ===
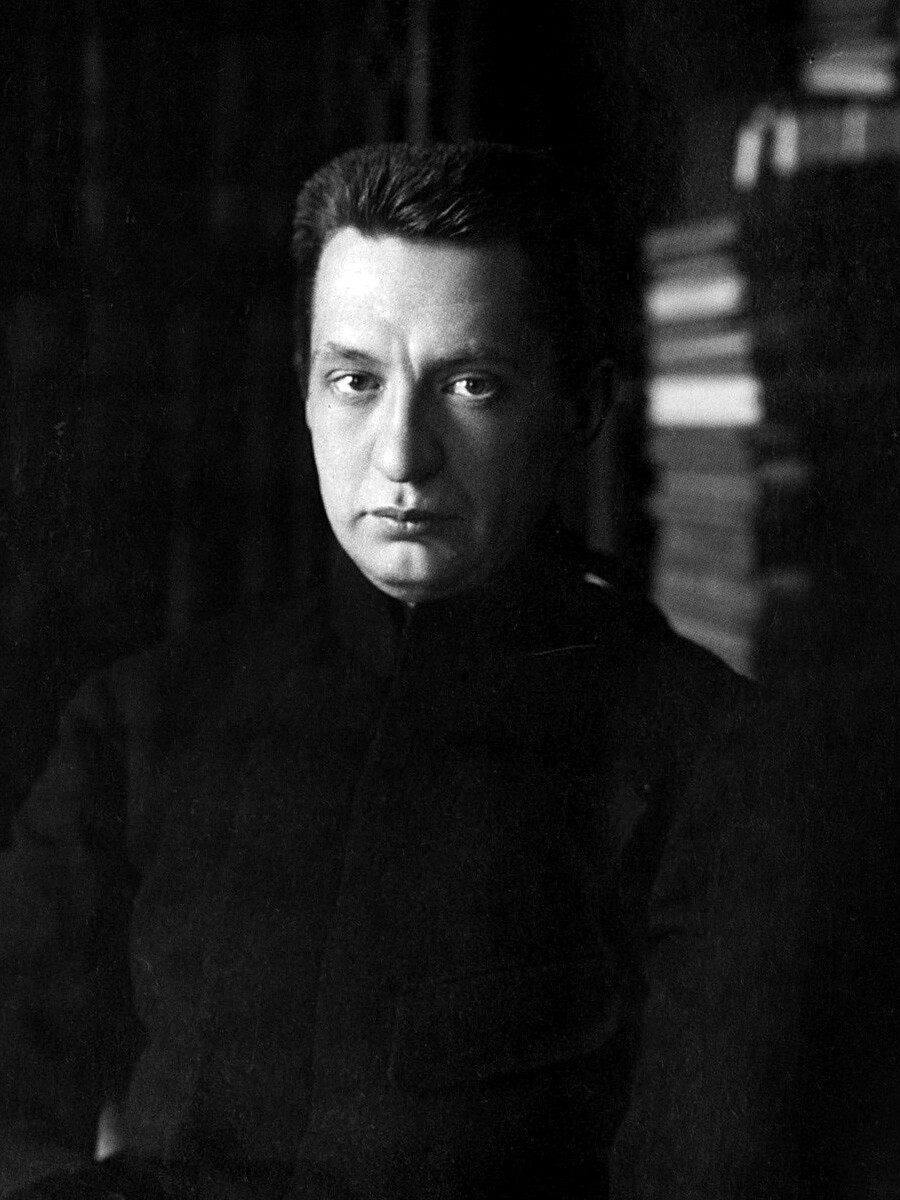
Prime Minister Kerensky in 1917; he led the Republic in July 1917 after a crisis within the country

During World War I, the Russian Empire experienced major protests over food shortages. Hence the popularity of Nicholas II drastically drained. Major unrest began to rise within the country, until a revolution in February occurred, which deposed the Emperor. The revolution led to the abolishment of the monarchy in March 1917 (February in the old Julian calendar).

=== Establishment ===
Following the abdication of Emperor Nicholas II, the Republic was unofficially established by the Russian Provisional Government in March 1917, where Georgy Lvov was elected as the head of the Republic. The Provisional Committee of the State Duma was also established, which consisted of mainly liberal politicians.

Lvov announced the restoration of the country, and elections were later held for the members of the Russian Constituent Assembly. Following a crisis in July, Lvov resigned and was replaced with Alexander Kerensky elected as Prime Minister. Kerensky was under the Socialist Revolutionary Party.

Due to mass unsatisfaction across the nation prior, a failed military coup led by Gen. Lavr Kornilov resulted in the official proclamation of the Republic.

=== Dissolution ===
In January 1918, a constitution was adopted, with the establishment of the assembly. However the next day, the assembly was dissolved by Bolshevik troops led under Vladimir Lenin during the October Revolution. On January 25, the Bolsheviks seized power. The name kept being used by the Bolsheviks until they established the Russian Soviet Federative Socialist Republic. An effort to take over power led by Kerensky resulted in an attempted coup and uprising, which failed.

Kerensky hence fled Russia and went into exile with his family, where he went to Paris and later spent his life in New York City.

== See also ==
- Soviet Union
- Russian Civil War
- Directorate (Russia)
- History of the Russian Federation
