= Russian Constitution of 1918 =

- Decree on the system of government of Russia (1918)
- Soviet Russia Constitution of 1918
- The act on the establishment of the All-Russian supreme power
