= Russian Republic =

Russian state from 1917 to 1918

Russian Republic (1917–1918) Российская Республика (Note: Pre-Reform Russian: Россійская Pеспублика) Russian Democratic Federative Republic (1918) Российская Демократическая Федеративная Республика (Note: Pre-Reform Russian: Россійская Демократическая Федеративная Республика)
- 1917–1918
- Flag Coat of arms
- Anthem: Рабочая Марсельеза; Rabochaya Marsel'yeza "Worker's Marseillaise"
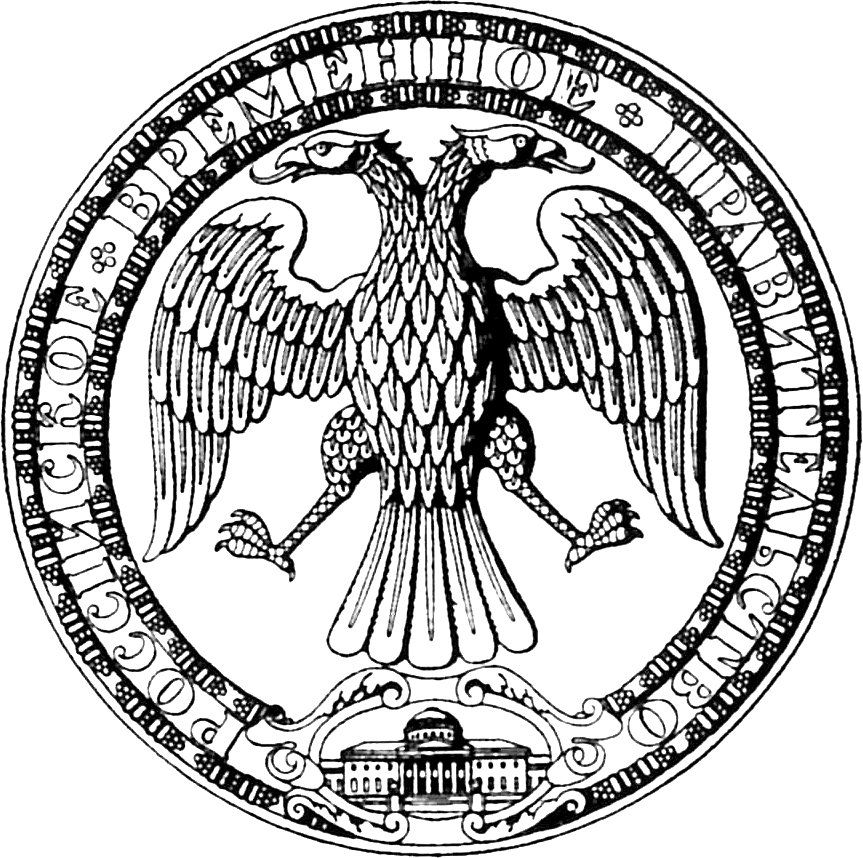
- Government Seal and Coat of Arms (1917)

- Territories under Russian control during the final years of WWI (including temporary occupations)
- Capital: Petrograd
- Common languages: Russian
- Demonym: Russian
- Government: Russian provisional government (1917) Federal parliamentary directorial republic under a provisional government (1917–1918)
- Minister-Chairman
  - September–November 1917: Alexander Kerensky (Note: Served as the prime minister of the provisional government from July 1917)
  - 1917–1918: none (Note: De facto power seized by the Bolsheviks led by Vladimir Lenin)
- Chairman of the Constituent Assembly
  - 18–19 January 1918: Viktor Chernov
- Legislature: Provisional Council (1917) none (1917–1918); Constituent Assembly (Note: Dissolved after the first meeting) (1918)
- Historical era: World War I / Russian; Revolution
  - Kornilov affair: 10–13 September 1917
  - Republic proclaimed: 14 September 1917
  - October Revolution: 7 November 1917
  - Assembly elected: 25 November 1917
  - Constitution adopted: 18 January 1918
  - Constituent Assembly dissolved: 19 January 1918
  - Russian SFSR proclaimed: 25 January 1918
- Currency: Ruble
Preceded by	Succeeded by
Russian Empire	Russian SFSR; Russian State

The Russian Republic (Note: Russian: Российская Республика, romanized: Rossiyskaya Respublika, IPA: [rɐˈsʲijskəjə rʲɪsˈpublʲɪkə].) (Note: Known also as the Russian Democratic Federative Republic in the 1918 Constitution (Russian: Российская Демократическая Федеративная Республика, romanized: Rossiyskaya Demokraticheskaya Federativnaya Respublika)) was the short-lived Russian state which controlled, de jure, the territory of the former Russian Empire after its proclamation by the Russian Provisional Government on 1 September (14 September, N.S.) 1917 in a decree signed by Alexander Kerensky as Minister-Chairman and Alexander Zarudny as Minister of Justice.

The government of the Russian Republic was dissolved after the Bolsheviks seized power by force on 7 November 1917. Nonetheless, a partially democratic election of the Constituent Assembly still took place later in November. On 18 January 1918, this assembly issued a decree, proclaiming Russia a democratic federal republic, but was also dissolved by the Bolsheviks on the next day after the proclamation.

The Bolsheviks also used the name "Russian Republic" until its renaming to the "Russian Soviet Republic" which was declared in January 1918; but the official name "Russian Socialist Federative Soviet Republic" was formally adopted in the Constitution of July 1918. The term is sometimes used erroneously for the period between the abdication of the Emperor Nicholas II on 2 March 1917 (15 March, N.S.) and the declaration of the Russian Republic in September. However, during that period the status of the Russian political system was unresolved, left up to be decided by a future elected Constituent Assembly.

== History ==
Following the February Revolution, Emperor Nicholas II abdicated his throne and a Provisional Government was formed, under the leadership of Prince Georgy Lvov. The status of the monarchy was left unresolved.

Officially, the Republic's government was the Provisional Government, although de facto control of the country was contested between it, the soviets (chiefly the Petrograd Soviet), and various ethnic-based separatists (such as the Central Council of Ukraine). Soviets were political organizations of the proletariat, strongest in industrial regions, and were dominated by left-wing parties. Soviets, whose influence was supplemented with paramilitary forces, were occasionally able to rival the Provisional Government which had an ineffective state apparatus.

During his first weeks as prime minister, Lvov presided over a series of fleeting reforms which sought to radically liberalize Russia. Universal adult suffrage was introduced, freedoms of press and speech were granted, capital punishment abolished, and all legal restrictions of religion, class and race were removed. Unable to rally sufficient support, he resigned in July 1917 in favor of his Minister of War, Alexander Kerensky.

The Government's control of the military was tenuous. Seamen of the Baltic Fleet, for example, had far-left views and openly engaged in political activism in the capital. Right-wing proclivities among the army officers were also a problem – Kerensky's attempt to dismiss Gen. Lavr Kornilov led to a failed coup.

Following the failure of Kornilov's coup, Kerensky proclaimed Russia to be a Republic on 1 September, establishing a Provisional Council as temporary parliament, in preparation to the elections of a Constituent Assembly. However, on 7 November 1917, the Bolsheviks seized power and dissolved both the Provisional Government and the Provisional Council.

Nonetheless, a partially democratic election of the Constituent Assembly still took place later in November. On 18 January 1918, this assembly issued a decree, proclaiming Russia a democratic federal republic under the name "Russian Democratic Federative Republic", However, the next day the Assembly was dissolved by the Bolsheviks.

The Republic de jure continued to exist until the Bolsheviks proclaimed the creation of the Russian Soviet Republic on 25 January 1918. In response, anti-Bolshevik forces proclaimed the Russian State in September 1918, under the leadership of the Provisional All-Russian Government.

== Principal institutions ==
- All-Russian Congress of Soviets
- Directorate (Russia)
- Provisional Council of the Russian Republic
- Russian Constituent Assembly
- Russian Provisional Government

== See also ==
- Bibliography of the Russian Revolution and Civil War
- Outline of the Russian Revolution and Civil War
- Index of articles related to the Russian Revolution and Civil War
- Elections in Russia
