= Outline of the Russian Revolution and Civil War =

List of outlines of the Russian Revolution and Civil War

The following outlines are provided as overviews of and topical guides to the Russian Revolution and Civil War, the period of revolution, state collapse and armed conflict in the Russian Empire and its successor states between 1917 and 1923. (Note: For a list of states involved in the Russian Revolution and Civil War, see Russian Civil War by location.)

== Precursors ==
- Outline of the Russo-Japanese War (1904–1905).
- Outline of the Russian Revolution of 1905 (1905–1907).

== Revolution of 1917 ==
- Outline of Russia during World War I (1914–1918).
- Outline of the Russian Revolution (1917).
  - Outline of the February Revolution (1917).
  - Outline of the Russian Republic (1917).
  - Outline of the October Revolution (1917).

== Civil War ==
- Outline of the Russian Civil War (1917–1923).
  - Outline of the White movement (1917–1923).
  - Outline of the Red Terror (1918–1922).
  - Outline of the Polish–Soviet War (1919–1921).

== See also ==
- Index of articles related to the Russian Revolution and Civil War.
- Bibliography of the Russian Revolution and Civil War.
- Bibliography of Ukrainian history
- Revolutions of 1917–1923.
