= Boris Sokoloff =

Russian-French politician, doctor, and author

Boris Sokoloff (1889–1979) was a Russian and later French politician, medical doctor, soldier, cancer researcher, and author.

== Political career ==
After graduating from the University of St. Petersburg, Sokoloff helped draft the All-Russian Constitution that governed the Russian Constituent Assembly, the legislative body that would ultimately be overthrown by the All-Russian Central Executive Committee led by Lenin. He was sentenced to death, but survived and escaped from Russia. In 1956, Sokoloff published The White Nights: Pages From a Russian Doctor's Notebook, a memoir of his participation in the failed effort to stop the rise of the Bolsheviks in Russia.

== Medical career ==
Sokoloff began his career as a doctor and medical researcher, publishing his first medical study at just seventeen. After escaping Russia, Sokoloff moved to Paris. At the invitation of the Rockefeller Institute, he relocated to the United States, where he worked at the Memorial Sloan Kettering Cancer Center, the University of Washington Cancer Research Center, and the Cancer Research Laboratory at Florida Southern College.
