= Maria Skrydlova =

Russian soldier in the Women's Battalion of Death (fl. 1917)

- Мария Николаевна Скрыдлова
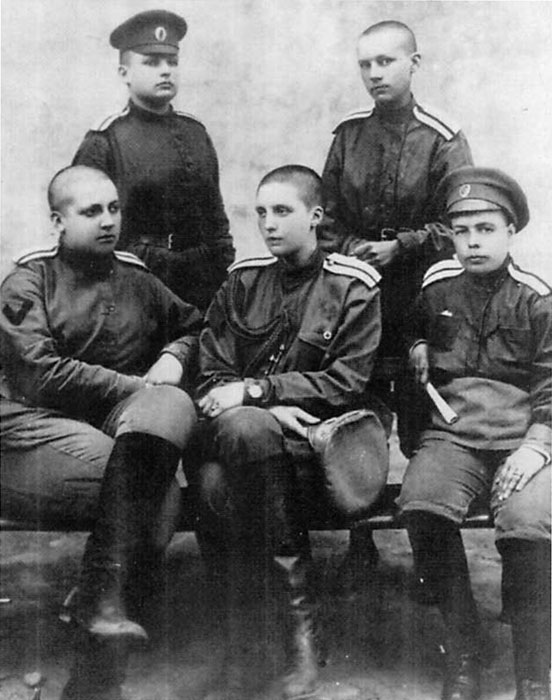
- The leadership of the military unit. Summer 1917. In the photo, M. Skrydlova is seated in the center.
- Born: c. 1899; Russian Empire
- Died: Unknown
- Relatives: Nikolai Skrydlov (father)
- Military career
- Allegiance: Russian Republic
- Branch: Russian Army
- Service years: 1917
- Unit: 1st Russian Women's Battalion of Death
- Conflicts: Kerensky Offensive: Battle of Smarhon
- Awards: Cross of St. George

Maria Nikolayevna Skrydlova (Мария Николаевна Скрыдлова, c. 1899 - date of death unknown), sometimes transliterated Skridlova, was a Russian soldier and the adjutant of the 1st Russian Women's Battalion of Death under Maria Bochkareva during World War I. The daughter of Admiral Nikolai Skrydlov, she fought in the Kerensky Offensive of July 1917 and received the Cross of St. George.

== Background ==
Her father, Admiral Nikolai Illarionovich Skrydlov (1844–1918), had commanded both the Black Sea Fleet and the Russian Pacific Squadron. Accounts of her age at enlistment differ. Helen Rappaport gives 18, while a Russian-language source puts her at 25. She was educated at a convent and reportedly spoke five languages.

== Service in the Women's Battalion of Death ==
After the February Revolution, the Russian Provisional Government authorised all-female combat units in the spring of 1917, in the hope that their example would shame male soldiers back into the fight. Skrydlova volunteered for the 1st Russian Women's Battalion of Death, and Maria Bochkareva appointed her adjutant. The American journalist Bessie Beatty interviewed her in Petrograd and recorded her fear of meeting her German cousin on the battlefield. On 25 June 1917 the battalion received its colours at Saint Isaac's Cathedral in Petrograd, and left for the front within days.

== Battle of Smarhon ==
In July 1917 the battalion went to the Western Front near Smarhon (Smorgon, in present-day Belarus) as part of the Kerensky Offensive. Skrydlova fought alongside Bochkareva. She was wounded in action and returned to Petrograd lame and concussed. She received the Cross of St. George for her conduct under fire. Her subsequent fate, including whether she survived the Russian Civil War, is not known.

== In popular culture ==
Skrydlova is among the women interviewed in Bessie Beatty's The Red Heart of Russia (1918). The 2015 Russian feature film Batalon, directed by Dmitry Meskhiev, dramatises the history of the battalion in which she served.
