= Jailbirds of Kerensky =

Prisoners in Russia given amnesty in 1917

Jailbirds of Kerensky (Russian: Птенцы Керенского, romanized: Ptentsy Kerenskogo) was an informal term used during the Russian Revolution for people who were released from Russian jails on amnesty. A total of three amnesties were enacted by Russian Minister of Justice Alexander Kerensky in 1917. According to some historians, about 90,000 political prisoners were released along with an unknown number of non-political prisoners.

When Kerensky was appointed a Minister of Justice in the newly established Russian Provisional Government, on 16 March [O.S. 3 March] 1917 the Russian Ministry of Justice abolished special civil courts, the Okhrana (Russian secret police), and the Russian Gendarmerie. On 19 March [O.S. 6 March] 1917 Kerensky's ministry issued an order of political amnesty. Following that on 27 March [O.S. 14 March] 1917 military amnesty was announced and after three days the Ministry of Justice issued a ruling "On the relief of the fate of persons who have committed criminal offenses" (Russian: Об облегчении участи лиц, совершивших уголовные преступления).

Following the amnesty, on 22 March [O.S. 9 March] 1917 the Bureau of the Central Committee of the Russian Social Democratic Labour Party (Bolsheviks) adopted a resolution about the Provisional Government which stated that the main task of the Soviets is "The universal arming of the people and, in particular, the immediate creation of a workers' Red Guard throughout the country". On 26 March 1917 this decision was published in the Bolshevik party newspaper "Pravda".

== See also ==
- Red Guards (Russia)
