= Sergei Salazkin =

Russian biochemist (1862–1932)

Sergey Salazkin
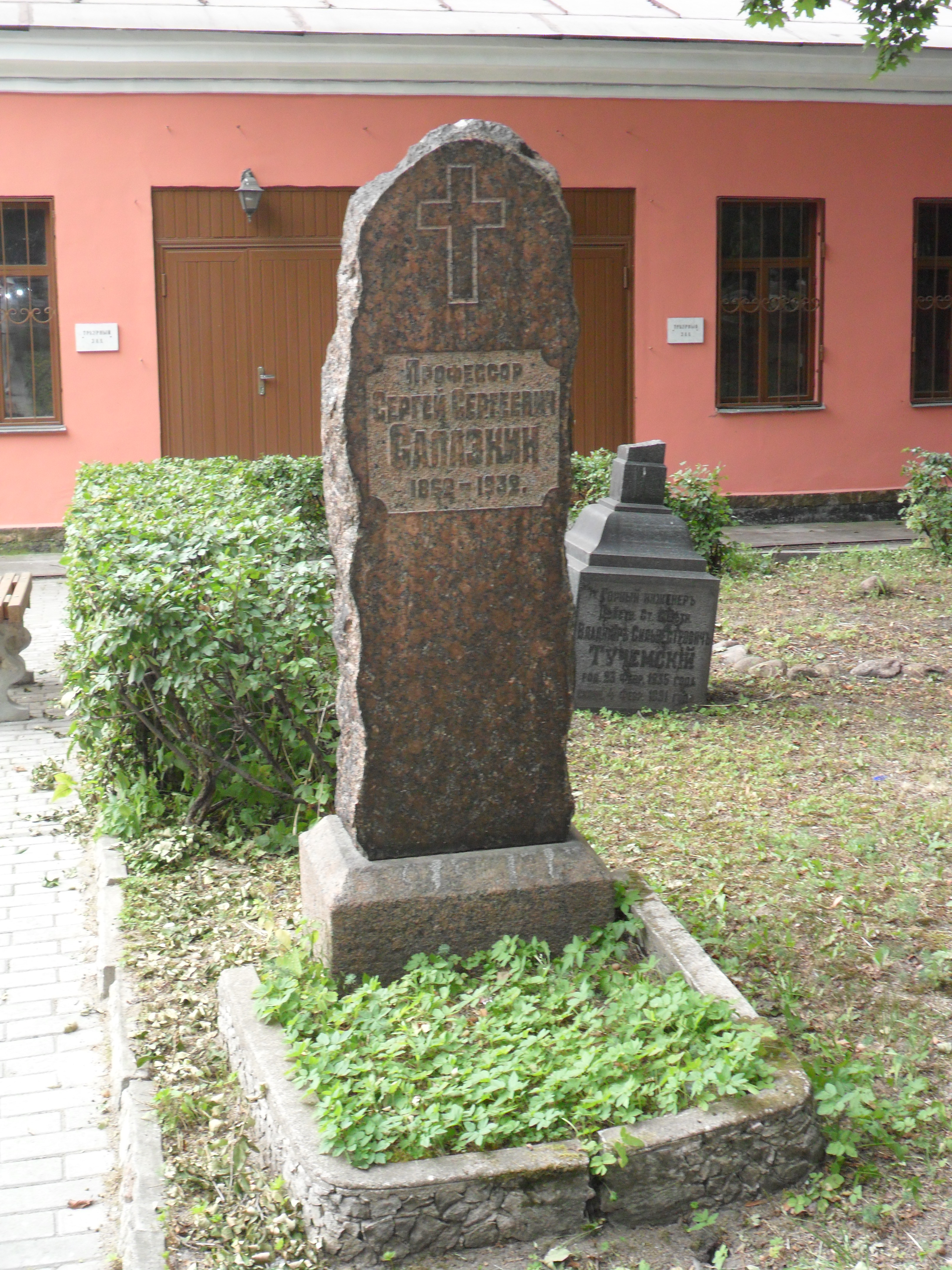
- Born: March 10, 1862; Vladimir Governorate
- Died: August 4, 1932; Leningrad
- Resting place: Novodevichy Cemetery in Saint Petersburg
- Education: St. Vladimir University
- Occupations: scientist, educator
- Employer: Saint Petersburg Women's Medical Institute Crimean University Leningrad Medical Institute Institute of Experimental Medicine
- Title: Doctor of Medical Sciences
- Political party: Constitutional Democratic Party (Kadets)

Sergei Sergeievich Salazkin (1862–1932) was a biochemist and academic. The last Minister of Public Education of the Provisional Government (September–October 1917). Director of the Women's Medical Institute in Saint Petersburg (1905–1911), Rector of the Crimean University in Simferopol (1924–1925), Director of the Institute of Experimental Medicine (1927–1931).

== Life ==
S.S. Salazkin was born on February 26 (March 10), 1862, in Doschatoe in the Russian Empire. He studied physics and mathematics at the University of St. Petersburg and medicine at the University of Kiev, graduating in 1891. From 1898 to 1911 he was a professor at the Women's Medical Institute in St. Petersburg.

Salazkin was broadly sympathetic to liberal and progressive political causes but did not formally join any political party. Nevertheless, in 1917, he was briefly catapulted into the political arena, serving as non-party Minister of Education in the Russian Provisional Government during the third coalition. After this government was overthrown in the October Revolution, Salazkin withdrew from politics and resumed his academic career.

From 1918 to 1925 he taught at the University of the Crimea in Simferopol, where he also served as rector. Salazkin was a professor at the Leningrad Medical Institute (1925–1931) and worked at the Institute for Experimental Medicine (1926–1931), becoming its director in 1927. Salazkin was noted mainly for his work on the metabolisation of nitrogen. He studied the formation of urea and uric acid and the role of the liver in this process.

Sergei Salazkin died in Leningrad on August 4, 1932.
