= Alexander Manuilov =

Russian economist and politician

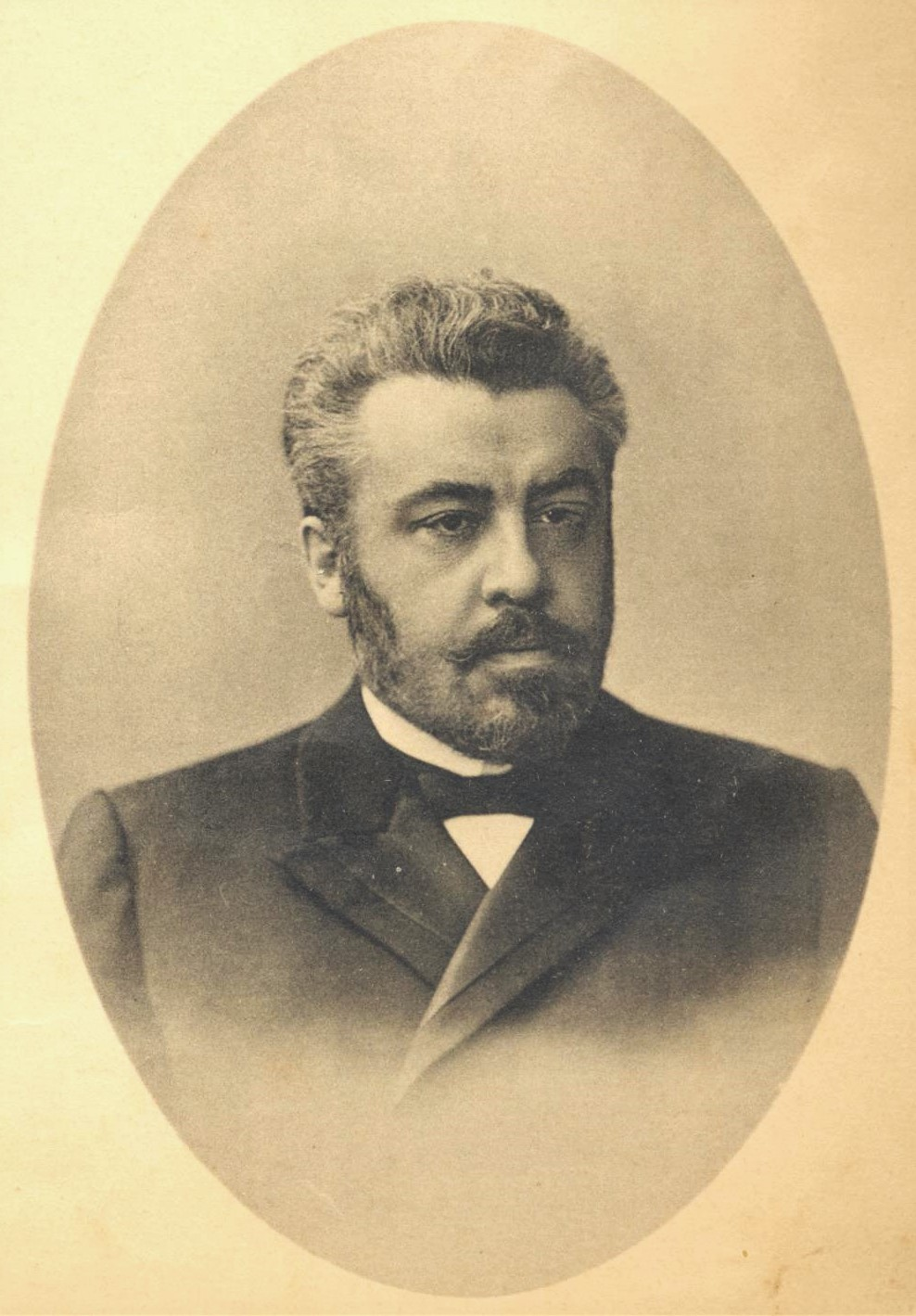
Alexander Manuilov.

Alexander Appolonovich Manuilov (Russian: Алекса́ндр Аполло́нович Ману́йлов; April 3, 1861 in Odessa – July 20, 1929 in Moscow) was a Russian economist and politician. He was one of the founding members of the Constitutional Democratic party (known as the Kadets) and was the Rector of Moscow State University between 1908 and 1911.

He was the Minister of Education in the first Provisional Government and from 1924 was in the central administration of Gosbank, the Soviet state bank.

== Sources ==
- Izvestia Article & Notes
- Photograph & Notes (in Russian)
