= Petr Levanidov =

Petr Levanidov Russian: Пётр Леванидов
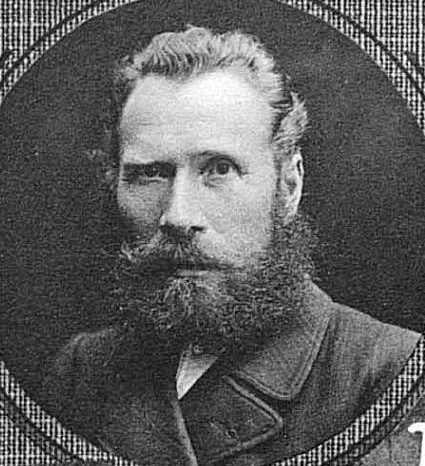
- photo of 1913

Deputy of the Fourth Imperial Duma
- In office 20 November 1912 – 6 October 1917
- Monarch: Nicholas II / monarchy abolished
- Succeeded by: post abolished

Personal details
- Born: Petr Aleksandrovich Levanidov; 24 June 1864 Arkhangelsk Governorate, Russian Empire
- Died: 1937 Arkhangelsk
- Party: Constitutional Democratic Party

Petr Aleksandrovich Levanidov (Russian: Пётр Алекса́ндрович Левани́дов; 24 June 1864, Arkhangelsk Governorate — 1937, Arkhangelsk) was a head of a volost (volostnoy starshina) and deputy of the Fourth Imperial Duma from the Arkhangelsk Governorate between 1912 and 1917. After the February Revolution of 1917, he became a commissar of the Provisional Government.

== Biography ==
Peter Levanidov was born on 24 June 1864, in Klimovskaya village of in the Shenkursk uyezd (Arkhangelsk Governorate) in a peasant family: his father was Alexander Stepanovich Levanidov, a volost clerk. Peter got only an initial (home) education, since the nearest school was as far as 20 versts from the village. Between 1887 and 1889, he served as a clerk in the village; then, for almost 17 years, he was the forestry inspector. In 1905, during the peasant unrest of the Russian Revolution, he had to leave the service.

After that Levanidov became a head of his volost (volostnoy starshina) – according to the Arkhangelsk governor, Petr Levanidov was "an ordinary peasant, underdeveloped, right [in political views]". On 20 October 1912 he was elected to the Fourth Imperial Duma from the Arkhangelsk Governorate. Despite the governor's opinion, in the IV Duma, he joined the faction of the Constitutional Democratic Party – he also became a member of a number of Duma commissions. Later he joined the Progressive Bloc.

Levanidov negatively spoke about the progress of the Stolypin agrarian reform – in June 1913, protesting against the violence, which in practice was accompanied its conduct, he claimed:

The government still keeps us, the peasants, in the position of the children, to whom they put a state nurse, and without it we can not even manage the farming as we want. But we declare that we have grown up and do not need nannies.

After the February Revolution of 1917, Petr Aleksandrovich received the post of a commissar of the Provisional Committee of the State Duma and the Provisional Government of Russia in Arkhangelsk Governorate. Already in March, he traveled to his homeland – Shenkursk – with the aim of organizing a new government "on the ground".

After the October Revolution, Levanidov lived in Shenkursk; at the end of January 1919, he moved with his family to Arkhangelsk. During the Soviet era, he was persecuted by the Bolshevik authorities. He died in 1937.

== Family ==
According to 1912 data, Peter Levanidov was married and had four children (two sons).

== Literature ==
- Николаев, А.Б. (2008). "Леванидов Петр Александрович". Государственная дума Российской империи: 1906—1917 (in Russian). Москва: РОССПЭН. p. 735. ISBN 978-5-8243-1031-3.
- Боиович, М. М., ed. (1913). "Леванидов". Члены Государственной думы (портреты и биографии): Четвертый созыв, 1912—1917 г. (in Russian). Москва: Тип. Т-ва И. Д. Сытина. pp. LXIV, 454, [2].
- Овсянкин, Е. И. (2001). "Леванидов Петр Александрович". Поморская энциклопедия: в 5 т. (in Russian). Vol. 1. Архангельск: Поморский государственный университет им. М. В. Ломоносова. p. 483. ISBN 5-88086-147-3.
