= Yuri Danilov =

Russian general (1866–1937)

Yuri Nikiforovich Danilov
- Юрий Никифорович Данилов
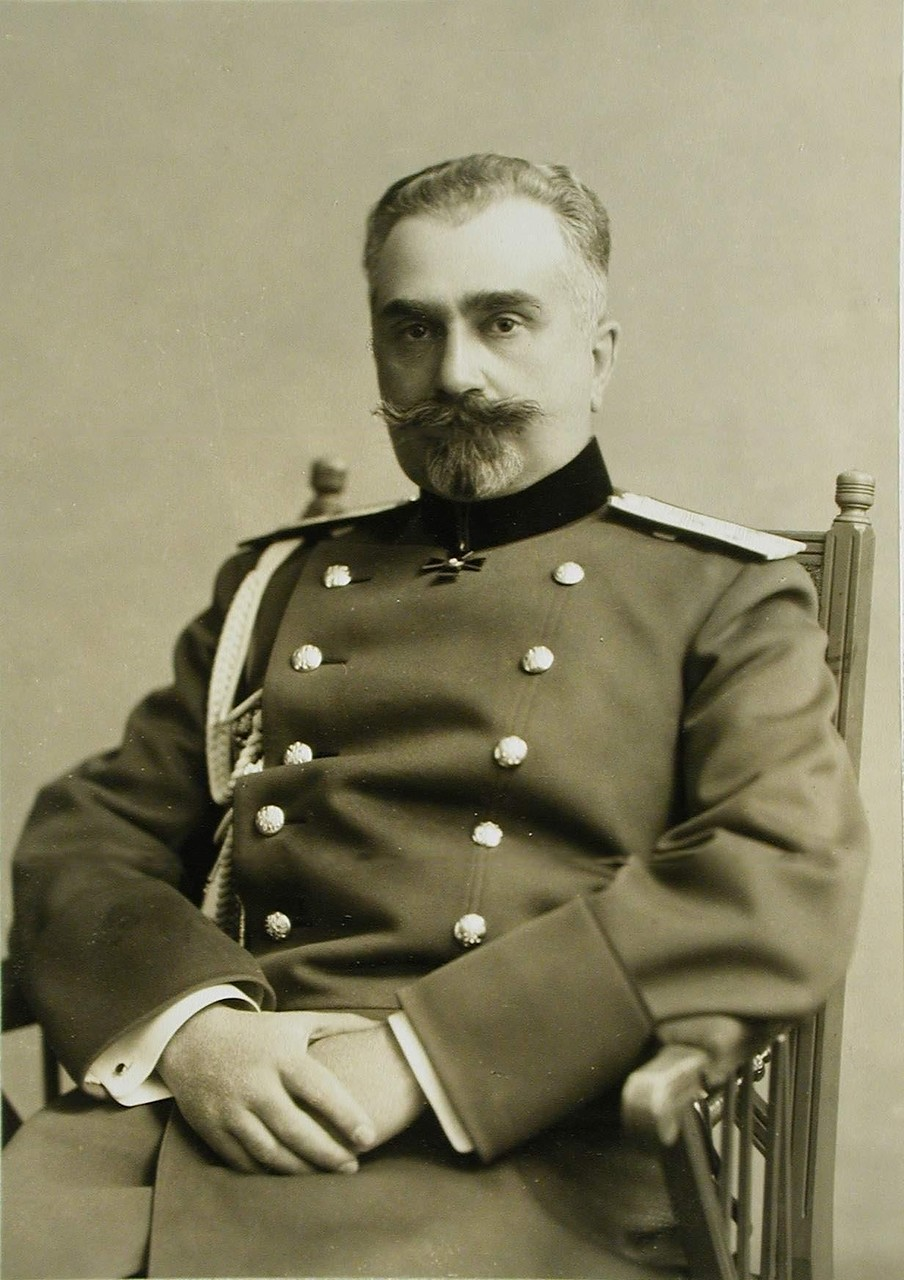
- Born: 13 August 1866; Kiev, Kiev Governorate, Russian Empire
- Died: 3 February 1937 (aged 70); Paris, France
- Military career
- Allegiance: Russian Empire; Russian SFSR (Russia) White Movement
- Branch: Imperial Russian Army (Russian Soviet Federative Socialist Republic) Red Army (Russian Republic) Volunteer Army
- Rank: General of Infantry
- Conflicts: World War I

Yuri Nikiforovich Danilov (Russian: Юрий Никифорович Данилов; 13 August [O.S. 1 August] 1866 – 3 February 1937) was a Russian military officer. In the years leading up to World War I, he served as the Quartermaster-General on the Russian General Staff and had a major role in developing Russia's war plan that was implemented in 1914.

He served in the Stavka of the Supreme Commander between 1914 and 1915, being responsible for Russian military operations in the early stage of the war, and was decorated for the successful capture of Galicia. But after Russia's Great Retreat in 1915 led to the removal of the supreme commander, Grand Duke Nicholas, Danilov was transferred from the Stavka to another post.

After the October Revolution in 1917 he briefly served as a military specialist for the Bolsheviks and participated in the peace talks with the Central Powers that led to the Treaty of Brest-Litovsk. However, in 1918 he left Bolshevik service and joined the Volunteer Army of the White movement, and later emigrated to France after the Russian Civil War.

== Biography ==
From 1907 to 1914, Danilov was in charge of the Intelligence Section of the Russian Main Staff of the Imperial Russian Army.

At the start of World War I, Danilov was appointed Quartermaster General for the Imperial Russian Army. He was known as "Danilov the Black."

He was third in command after Grand Duke Nicholas Nikolaevich and his chief of staff Nikolai Yanushkevich.

With the Tsar's decision to take personal command of the army at the front in August 1915, both the Grand Duke and Danilov lost their positions. Appointed to the Northern Front, Danilov served as commander of 25th corps (1915–1916), chief of staff of the Northern Front (1916–1917), and commander of the 5th Army (29 April – 9 September 1917).

After the October Revolution of 1917, Danilov emigrated to Paris, France, where he remained until his death on 3 February 1937. He was the grandfather of Nicholas Daniloff, who was born in Paris in 1934 and later worked in the Soviet Union as a reporter for U.S. News & World Report, before being arrested by the KGB and accused of espionage in 1986.

== Works ==
- Россия в мировой войне 1914—1915 гг. — Берлин, 1924.
  - German translation: Russland im Weltkriege, 1914-1915. Jena. 1925.
  - French translation: La Russie dans la guerre mondiale (1914-1917). Traduction française d'Alexandre Kaznakov. Payot. 1927
- The Red Army. Foreign Affairs, Vol. 7, No. 1 (Oct., 1928), pp. 96–109.
