= Kerenka =

1917 Russian Provisional Government banknotes

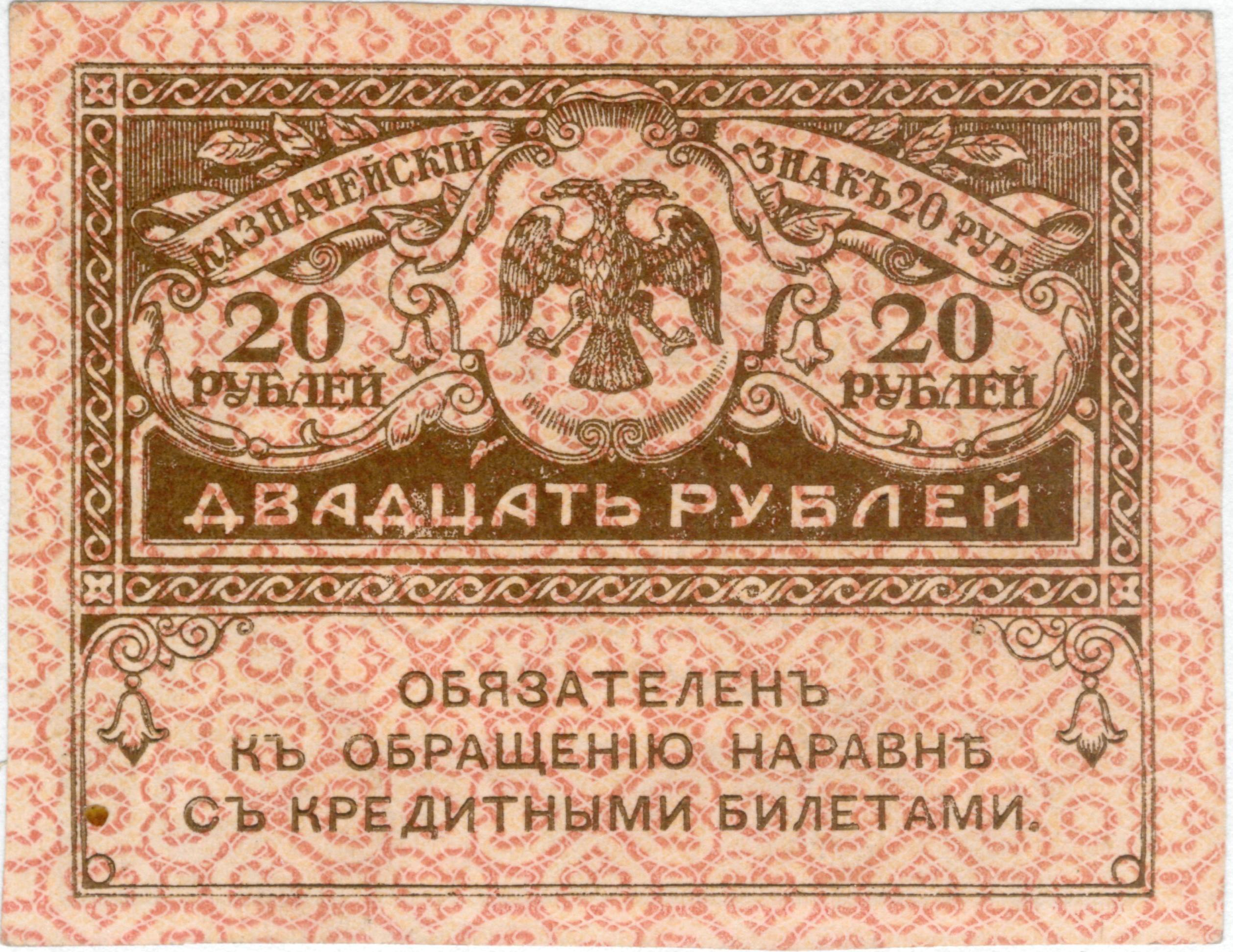

Kerenka (Russian: керенка) was an informal name of banknotes issued by the Russian Provisional Government in 1917, named so after the chairman Alexander Kerensky. They were also issued by the Gosbank of the Soviet Russia during 1917-1919 from the same plates.
