= Ivan Krivonogov =

Ivan Krivonogov Russian: Иван Кривоногов

Deputy of the Fourth Imperial Duma
- In office 20 November 1912 – 6 October 1917
- Monarch: Nicholas II / monarchy abolished
- Succeeded by: post abolished

Personal details
- Born: Ivan Vasilievich Krivonogov; 8 September 1866 Arkhangelsky Uyezd, Arkhangelsk Governorate, Russian Empire
- Died: 1918 RSFSR
- Party: Constitutional Democratic Party; Progressive Party

Ivan Vasilievich Krivonogov (Russian: Ива́н Васи́льевич Кривоно́гов; 8 September 1866, Arkhangelsk Governorate – 1918, RSFSR) was a medical doctor, deputy of the Arkhangelsk City Duma and deputy of the Fourth Imperial Duma from the Arkhangelsk Governorate between 1913 and 1917. After February Revolution of 1917, he became a commissar of the Russian Provisional Government.

== Biography ==
Ivan Krivonogov graduated from the Arkhangelsk gymnasium and then entered the Military Medical Academy in St. Petersburg. After graduation, he joined the Constitutional Democratic Party and got a private medical practice. Before 1913 Krivonogov was elected as a deputy of the Arkhangelsk City Duma; simultaneously, he was a chairperson of the Society of Arkhangelsk doctors.

In 1912, during the main period of elections to the Fourth Imperial Duma Krivonogov was refused by government officials to run for the office. Nevertheless, on 10 December 1913, during additional elections, he was elected to the Duma – to replace N. A. Startsev, who left the parliament "due to personal reasons".

In the IV Duma, Krivonogov adjoined the Progression faction (from the second session) and became a member of a number of parliamentary commissions. With the outbreak of the First World War, he became an assistant to a head of the medical unit of the Red Cross, established on the Northwestern Front.

After the February Revolution of 1917 Krivonogov carried out various assignments on behalf of the Provisional Committee of the State Duma. At the beginning of March 1917, he was sent as a commissar of the Russian Provisional Government to his homeland – Arkhangelsk – for an organization of local government and a "greeting of military units." He died in 1918.

== Family ==
According to 1913 data, Ivan Krivonogov was married and had three children.

== Literature ==
- Николаев, А. Б. (2008). "Кривоногов Иван Васильевич". Государственная дума Российской империи: 1906—1917 (in Russian). Москва: РОССПЭН. p. 735. ISBN 978-5-8243-1031-3.
- Трошина, Т. И. (2001). "Кривоногов Иван Васильевич". Поморская энциклопедия: в 5 т. (in Russian). Vol. 1. Архангельск: Поморский государственный университет им. М. В. Ломоносова. p. 483. ISBN 5-88086-147-3.
