= Russian Constituent Assembly =

Constituent Assembly of the Russian Republic

All-Russian Constituent Assembly Всероссийское Учредительное собрание
- The double-headed eagle, which remained the de jure coat of arms of Russia until 10 July 1918. Never formally used prior to the dissolution of the Assembly.

Type
- Type: Constituent assembly

History
- Established: 1917
- Disbanded: 1918
- Preceded by: Council of the Russian Republic
- Succeeded by: VTsIK; All-Russian Congress of Soviets; Provisional All-Russian Government; Third All-Russian Congress of Soviets (as constituent assembly); Both VTsIK and Congress had also governed Russia since the October Revolution.

Leadership
- Chairman of the Constituent Assembly: Viktor Chernov

Structure
- Seats: 767
- Political groups: Bolsheviks: 183 seats Mensheviks: 18 seats Armenian Revolutionary Federation: 10 seats Socialist Revolutionary Party: 324 seats Ukrainian Socialist-Revolutionary Party: 110 seats Kadets: 16 seats Alash Orda: 15 seats Musavat Party: 10 seats Cossacks: 17 seats Others: 64 seats

Elections
- Voting system: Direct multi-party elections via the proportional representation system (D'Hondt method was used to allocate seats in 81 multi-member districts)
- Last election: 25 November 1917

Meeting place
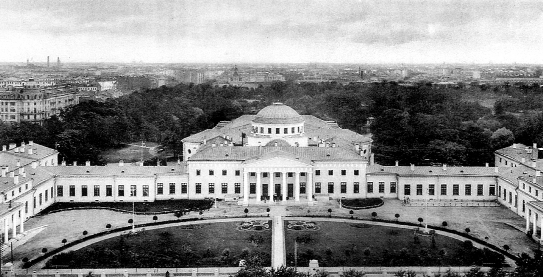
- Tauride Palace

The All Russian Constituent Assembly (Note: Declared by the Assembly to be Russian Democratic Federative Republic, but its foundation was interrupted by Bolshevik-controlled Russian Soviet Republic.) (Russian: Всероссийское учредительное собрание, romanized: Vserossiyskoye uchreditelnoye sobraniye) was a constituent assembly convened in Russia after the October Revolution of 1917. It met for 13 hours, from 4 p.m. to 5 a.m., 18–19 January [O.S. 5–6 January] 1918, whereupon it was dissolved by the Bolshevik-led All-Russian Central Executive Committee, proclaiming the Third All-Russian Congress of Soviets the new governing body of Russia.

The 1917 Russian Constituent Assembly election did not produce a democratically elected government, as the Bolsheviks, who were in power since the October Revolution which occurred prior to the election, subsequently disbanded the Constituent Assembly and proceeded to rule the country as a one-party state with all opposition parties outlawed. Some scholars have had a differing view and attributed the establishment of the one-party system in the Soviet Union to the wartime conditions imposed on the Bolshevik government and others have highlighted the initial attempts to form a coalition government with the Left Socialist Revolutionaries.

== Origins ==
A democratically elected Constituent Assembly to create a Russian constitution was one of the main demands of all Russian revolutionary parties prior to the Russian Revolution of 1905. In 1906, the Tsar decided to grant basic civil liberties and hold elections for a newly created legislative body, the State Duma. However, the Duma was never authorized to write a new constitution, much less abolish the monarchy. Moreover, the Duma's powers were falling into the hands of the Constitutional Democrats and not the Socialists. The government dissolved the Duma, as was their legal agreement, in July 1906 and, after a new election, in June 1907. The final election law written by the government after the second dissolution on 16 June [O.S. 3 June] 1907 favored the landed and ruling classes. The Duma was therefore widely seen as unrepresentative of the poorer peasants and working classes. Demands for a Constituent Assembly that would be elected on the basis of universal suffrage continued unabated. But what little the Duma could do after 1907 was often vetoed by the Emperor or the appointed upper house of the Russian parliament.

== Background ==
=== The Provisional Government (February–October 1917) ===
With the abdication of Tsar Nicholas II in the February Revolution of 1917, power in Russia passed to a Provisional Government formed by the liberal leadership of the Duma.

The Provisional Government was so named because it was made up of parliamentary figures, last elected (as the Fourth Duma) in 1912, who claimed provisional authority for managing the revolutionary situation in the midst of the First World War until a more permanent form of government could be established by an elected Constituent Assembly.

Grand Duke Michael had refused to ascend to his older brother Nicholas II's throne without the consent of an elected Constituent Assembly, and it was broadly assumed that an elected Constituent Assembly was the only body with the authority to change Russia's form of government. The Provisional Government claimed that it would organize elections once the First World War had concluded, but in spite of the initial agreement in July 1917, they declared Russia a republic and began preparations for elections in the "Preparliament", later named the Council of the Russian Republic. These actions triggered criticism from both left and right. Monarchists saw the declaration of a republican form of government in Russia as unacceptable, while the left considered the declaration a power grab intended to weaken the influence of the Soviets.

=== The Bolsheviks and the Constituent Assembly ===
The Bolsheviks' position on the Constituent Assembly evolved during 1917. At first, like all the other socialist parties, the Bolsheviks supported the election of a Constituent Assembly. Vladimir Lenin himself later argued: 'The demand for the convocation of a Constituent Assembly was a perfectly legitimate part of the programme of revolutionary Social-Democracy, because in a bourgeois republic the Constituent Assembly represents the highest form of democracy'.

But there was a potential contradiction in Bolshevik policy. Since Lenin's return from Switzerland in April 1917, the Bolsheviks had distinguished themselves from other socialists by calling for "All Power to the Soviets". The Bolsheviks thus opposed "bourgeois" parliamentary bodies, like the Provisional Government and the Constituent Assembly, in favour of the Soviets (directly elected revolutionary councils of workers, soldiers and peasants) which had arisen after the February Revolution.

On 7 November [O.S. 25 October] 1917, the Bolsheviks acted on this policy by leading the October Revolution against the Provisional Government. The uprising in Petrograd coincided with the convocation of the Second All-Russian Congress of Workers' and Soldiers' Soviets. The Soviet deputies of the more moderate socialist parties, the Mensheviks and the Right SRs, walked out of the Congress in protest at what they argued was a premature overthrow of the "bourgeois" government in which they had participated.

Over the next few weeks, the Bolsheviks established control in urban areas and in almost all of Great Russia, but had less success in the countryside and in ethnically non-Russian areas. Although the new Soviet government limited the freedom of the press (by sporadically banning non-socialist press) and persecuted the liberal Constitutional Democratic party for its undeclared but widespread support of General Kornilov's affair, it allowed elections for the Constituent Assembly to go ahead on 25 November [O.S. 12 November] 1917, as scheduled by the Provisional Government.

Officially, the Bolshevik government at first considered itself a provisional government and claimed that it intended to submit to the will of the Constituent Assembly. As Lenin wrote on 18 November [O.S. 5 November] 1917 (emphasis added):

Hence the Soviets of Peasants' Deputies, primarily the uyezd and then the gubernia Soviets, are from now on, pending the convocation of the Constituent Assembly, vested with full governmental authority in their localities.

== Election results (12/25 November 1917) ==
More than 60 percent of citizens with the right to vote actually voted for the Constituent Assembly. Due to the size of the country, the ongoing World War I and a deteriorating communications system, results were not fully available at the time. A partial count (54 constituencies out of 79) was published by N. V. Svyatitsky in A Year of the Russian Revolution. 1917–18, Moscow, Zemlya i Volya Publishers, 1918. Svyatitsky's data was generally accepted by all political parties, including the Bolsheviks, and was as follows:

Party	Votes	%
Socialist Revolutionaries (SRs)	17,943,000	40.4%
Bolsheviks	10,661,000	24.0%
Ukrainian SRs	3,433,000	7.7%
Constitutional Democrats ("Kadets")	2,088,000	4.7%
Mensheviks	1,144.000	2.6%
Other Russian Liberal Parties	1,261,000	2.8%
Georgian Menshevik Party	662,000	1.5%
Musavat (Azerbaijan)	616,000	1.4%
Dashnaktsutiun (Armenia)	560,000	1.3%
Left SRs	451,000	1.0%
Other Socialists	401,000	0.9%
Alash Orda (Kazakhstan)	407,000	0.9%
Other National Minority Parties	407,000	0.9%
Total (counted votes)	40,034,000	90%
Unaccounted	4,543,000	10%
Total	44,577,000	100%

The Bolsheviks received between 22% and 25% of the overall vote, (Note: The exact number of votes received by individual parties is still in dispute due to a large number of invalid ballots) but emerged the largest party in Russia's urban centers and among soldiers on the "Western Front" (two-thirds of those soldiers' votes). In the city of Moscow, the Bolsheviks won 47.9% of the votes, the Constitutional Democrats (Kadets) 35.7% and the SRs 8.1 percent. While losing the urban vote, the Socialist-Revolutionary Party received around 57–58% (62% with their social democratic allies), having won the massive support of the rural peasantry who constituted 80% of the Russian population.

However, scholars have argued that the vote had not properly represented the will of the peasantry. The ballots for the Assembly had not differentiated between the Right SRs, who opposed the Bolshevik government, and the Left SRs, who were coalition partners with the Bolsheviks. Thus many peasant votes intended for the Left SRs elected Right SR deputies. In his study of the Constituent Assembly election, O. H. Radkey argues:

The election, therefore, does not measure the strength of this element [i.e. the Left S-Rs]. The lists were drawn up long before the schism [between Left and Right S-Rs] occurred; they were top-heavy with older party workers whose radicalism had abated by 1917. The people voted indiscriminately for the S-R label… The leftward current was doubtless stronger everywhere on 12 November than when the lists had been drawn up.

== From the election to the convocation of the Assembly (November 1917–January 1918) ==
Lenin and the Bolsheviks began to cast doubt on the value of the Constituent Assembly as soon as it seemed likely that the Assembly would not contain a majority in favour of Soviet government. On 27 November [O.S. 14 November] 1917, Lenin told the Extraordinary All-Russia Congress of Soviets of Peasants' Deputies that the Constituent Assembly should not distract the peasants from the fight against capital:

The peasants want land and the prohibition of hired labour; they want implements for the cultivation of the soil. And this cannot be obtained without defeating capital. [...] You are throwing down a challenge to capital, you are following a different path from ours; but we are at one with you in that we are marching, and must march, towards the social revolution. As for the Constituent Assembly, the speaker [i.e. Lenin] said that its work will depend on the mood in the country, but he added, trust in the mood, but don't forget your rifles.

On 4 December [O.S. 21 November] 1917, People's Commissar for Naval Affairs Pavel Dybenko ordered to keep 7,000 pro-Bolshevik Kronstadt sailors on "full alert" in case of a convocation of the Constituent Assembly on 9 December [O.S. 26 November] 1917. A meeting of some 20,000 Kronstadt "soldiers, sailors, workers and peasants" resolved to only support a Constituent Assembly that was "so composed as to confirm the achievements of the October Revolution [and would be free of] Kaledinites and leaders of the counter-revolutionary bourgeoisie".

With the split between the Right and Left Socialist Revolutionaries finalized in November, the Bolsheviks formed a coalition government with the latter. On 11 December [O.S. 28 November] 1917, the Soviet government declared the Constitutional Democratic Party "a party of the enemies of the people", banned the party and ordered its leaders arrested. It also postponed the convocation of the Constituent Assembly until early January. At first the Soviet government blamed the delays on technical difficulties and machinations of their enemies.

On 26 December [O.S. 13 December] 1917, Lenin's Theses on the Constituent Assembly were published anonymously in the Bolshevik newspaper Pravda. The theses argued that "revolutionary Social-Democracy has ever since the beginning of the Revolution of 1917 repeatedly emphasised that a republic of Soviets is a higher form of democracy than the usual bourgeois republic with a Constituent Assembly."

Lenin argued that the Constituent Assembly did not truly represent the Russian people because its ballots had not represented the split between the anti-Bolshevik Right SRs and the pro-Bolshevik Left SRs:

[T]he party which from May to October had the largest number of followers among the people, and especially among the peasants – the Socialist-Revolutionary Party – came out with united election lists for the Constituent Assembly in the middle of October 1917, but split in November 1917, after the elections and before the Assembly met.

Lenin thus argued that:

[T]he interests of this [October 1917] revolution stand higher than the formal rights of the Constituent Assembly [...] Every direct or indirect attempt to consider the question of the Constituent Assembly from a formal, legal point of view, within the framework of ordinary bourgeois democracy and disregarding the class struggle and civil war, would be a betrayal of the proletariat's cause, and the adoption of the bourgeois standpoint.

Lenin's proposed solution to the problem was for the Constituent Assembly to agree to new elections in order to better represent the current will of the people, and to accept Soviet government in the interim:

The only chance of securing a painless solution to the crisis which has arisen owing to the divergence between the elections to the Constituent Assembly, on the one hand, and the will of the people and the interests of the working and exploited classes, on the other, is for the people to exercise as broadly and as rapidly as possible the right to elect the members of the Constituent Assembly anew, and for the Constituent Assembly to accept the law of the Central Executive Committee on these new elections, to proclaim that it unreservedly recognises Soviet power, the Soviet revolution, and its policy on the questions of peace, the land and workers' control, and to resolutely join the camp of the enemies of the Cadet-Kaledin counter-revolution.

Not all members of the Bolshevik party were willing to go along with what increasingly looked like an upcoming suppression of the Constituent Assembly. In early December, the moderates even had a majority among the Bolshevik delegates to the Constituent Assembly, but Lenin prevailed at the 24 December [O.S. 11 December] 1917 meeting of the Bolshevik Central Committee, which ordered Bolshevik delegates to follow Lenin's line.

== Meeting in Petrograd (5–6/18–19 January 1918) ==
On the morning of 18 January [O.S. 5 January] 1918, a large crowd gathered in Petrograd to march on the Tauride Palace in support of the Constituent Assembly. It was shot at and dispersed by soldiers loyal to the Bolshevik-Left SR Soviet government. The march had not been as large as its organizers had hoped: far fewer soldiers and workers than expected had attended and the demonstration had consisted mainly of middle-class students, civil servants and professionals.

The Constituent Assembly quorum met in the Tauride Palace in Petrograd, between 4 p.m. and 4:40 a.m., 18–19 January [O.S. 5–6 January] 1918. Armed guards were present everywhere in the building, weapons were allegedly pointed at speaking delegates and Viktor Chernov, despite being elected President of the Assembly, feared "a brawl" if he were too assertive. According to the Bolshevik Fyodor Raskolnikov, the initial conflict regarded who had the power to open the Assembly. In spite of the SR plurality, Bolshevik Yakov Sverdlov claimed to open the Assembly on the authority of the Central Executive Committee (of which he was chairman), causing an indignant reaction on the part of non-Bolshevik delegates. Referring to the Declaration of the Rights of Working and Exploited People, he said "The Central Executive Committee expresses the hope that the Constituent Assembly, in so far as it correctly expresses the wishes of the people, will associate itself with [the Declaration]." Later, a prominent Bolshevik, Ivan Skvortsov-Stepanov, in a speech approved by Lenin, explained the Bolsheviks' opposition to "bourgeois democracy" in favour of class rule by the peasants and the workers:

How can you appeal to such a concept as the will of the whole people? For a Marxist 'the people' is an inconceivable notion: the people does not act as a single unit. The people as a unit is a mere fiction, and this fiction is needed by the ruling classes. It is all over between us. You belong to one world, with the cadets and the bourgeoisie, and we to the other, with the peasants and the workers.

The Assembly was dominated by anti-Bolshevik Right SRs and their leader Victor Chernov was elected Chairman of the Assembly with 244 votes against 153 for Maria Spiridonova of the Left SRs. The Bolsheviks placed the Second Soviet Congress' Decrees before the Assembly for endorsement. They were rejected by 237 votes to 136. It was thus clear that the Constituent Assembly was opposed to Soviet government and would not agree to new elections. In a recess, a special meeting of the Bolsheviks and Left SRs decided to dissolve the Assembly. The Deputy People's Commissar for Naval Affairs Fyodor Raskolnikov read a prepared statement and the Bolsheviks and Left SRs walked out. Lenin left the building to go to bed, instructing the soldiers not to use force against the deputies, but to wait until they left of their own accord:

There is no need to disperse the Constituent Assembly: just let them go on chattering as long as they like and then break up, and tomorrow we won't let a single one of them come in.

Around 4 a.m., the Commandant of the Tauride Palace, an Anarchist sailor called Anatoli Zhelezniakov, approached Chernov and said:

The guard is tired. I propose that you close the meeting and let everybody go home.

The Right SRs tried to use the final minutes of the Constituent Assembly to pass socialist measures which they had failed to implement in months of power in the Provisional Government. Chernov responded to the Soviet Decrees on Land and Peace with the SR-drafted "Law on the Land", which proclaimed a radical land reform, a law making Russia a democratic federal republic (thus ratifying the Provisional Government's decision adopted in September 1917) and an appeal to the Entente Allies for a democratic peace. The Assembly voted for the proposals, scheduled the next meeting for 5 p.m. on 19 January [O.S. 6 January] 1918 and dispersed at 4:40 a.m. The next day the deputies found the building locked down and the Assembly declared dissolved by the Bolshevik-Left SR Soviet government. The government immediately called the Third Congress of Soviets, which produced a large Bolshevik majority, as a democratic counterweight to the dissolution of the Constituent Assembly. A Decree of dissolution of Parliament was ratified by the All-Russian Central Executive Committee (VTsIK) later that day.

== Public reaction to closure ==
Shortly after the closure of the Constituent Assembly, a Right SR deputy from the Volga region argued: "[To] defend the Constituent Assembly, to defend us, its members - that is the duty of the people." In his short book on Lenin, Leon Trotsky described the end of the Constituent Assembly as follows:

[The deputies of the assembly] brought candles with them in case the Bolsheviks cut off the electric light and a vast number of sandwiches in case their food be taken from them. Thus democracy entered upon the struggle with dictatorship heavily armed with sandwiches and candles. The people did not give a thought to supporting those who considered themselves their elect and who in reality were only shadows of a period of the revolution that was already passed.

Ronald W. Clark notes that the closure of the Constituent Assembly provoked "comparatively little reaction, even in political circles." Orlando Figes argued: "There was no mass reaction to the closure of the Constituent Assembly. ... The SR intelligentsia had always been mistaken in their belief that the peasants shared their veneration for the Constituent Assembly. ... [To] the mass of the peasants ... it was only a distant thing in the city, dominated by the 'chiefs' of the various parties, which they did not understand, and was quite unlike their own political organizations."

Figes argues that the Right SRs' allegiance to the Provisional Government had isolated them from the mass of peasants: "Their adopted sense of responsibility for the state (and no doubt a little pride in their new ministerial status) led the Right SRs to reject their old terrorist ways of revolutionary struggle and depend exclusively on parliamentary methods."

In his study of the Constituent Assembly election, O.H. Radkey argued:

Of ... fateful significance was the fact that while the democratic parties heaped opprobrium upon him [i.e. Lenin] for this act of despotism, their following showed little inclination to defend an institution which the Russian people had ceased to regard as necessary to the fulfilment of its cherished desires. For the Constituent Assembly, even before it had come into existence, had been caught in a back-eddy of the swiftly flowing stream of revolutionary developments and no longer commanded the interest and allegiance of the general population which alone could have secured it against a violent death.

== Between Petrograd and Samara (January–June 1918) ==
Barred from the Tauride Palace, Constituent Assembly deputies met at the Gurevich High School and held a number of secret meetings, but found that the conditions were increasingly dangerous. Some tried to relocate to the Tsentralna Rada-controlled Kiev, but on 28 January [O.S. 15 January] 1918 Rada forces had to abandon the city, which effectively terminated the Constituent Assembly as a cohesive body.

The Socialist Revolutionary Central Committee met in January and decided against armed resistance since:

Bolshevism, unlike the Tsarist autocracy, is based on workers and soldiers who are still blinded, have not lost faith in it, and do not see that it is fatal to the cause of the working class

Instead the socialists (Socialist Revolutionaries and their Menshevik allies) decided to work within the Soviet system and returned to the Soviet All-Russian Central Executive Committee (VTsIK), the Petrograd Soviet and other Soviet bodies that they had walked out of during the Bolshevik uprising in October 1917. They hoped that Soviet re-elections would go their way once the Bolsheviks proved unable to solve pressing social and economic problems. They would then achieve a majority within local Soviets and, eventually, the Soviet government, at which point they would be able to re-convene the Constituent Assembly.

The socialists' plan was partially successful in that Soviet re-elections in the winter and especially spring of 1918 often returned pro-SR and anti-Bolshevik majorities, but their plan was frustrated by the Soviet government's refusal to accept election results and its repeated dissolution of anti-Bolshevik Soviets. As one of the leaders of Tula Bolsheviks N. V. Kopylov wrote to the Bolshevik Central Committee in early 1918:

After the transfer of power to the soviet, a rapid about-face began in the mood of the workers. The Bolshevik deputies began to be recalled one after another, and soon the general situation took on a rather unhappy appearance. Despite the fact that there was a schism among the SRs, and the Left SRs were with us, our situation became shakier with each passing day. We were forced to block new elections to the soviet and even not to recognize them where they had taken place not in our favor.

In response, Socialist Revolutionaries and Mensheviks started Assemblies of Workers' Plenipotentiaries which ran in parallel with the Bolshevik-dominated Soviets. The idea proved popular with the workers, but had little effect on the Bolshevik government.

With the signing of the Treaty of Brest-Litovsk by the Bolsheviks on 3 March 1918, the Left Socialist Revolutionary leadership increasingly viewed the Bolshevik government as a German proxy. They were willing to consider an alliance with the liberal Constitutional Democrats, which had been rejected as recently as December 1917 by their Fourth Party Congress. Socialists and liberals held talks on creating a united anti-Bolshevik front in Moscow in late March. However, the negotiations broke down because the SRs insisted on re-convening the Constituent Assembly as elected in November 1917 while the Constitutional Democrats, who had polled weakly in the November election, demanded new elections.

== Samara Committee (June–September 1918) ==
On 7 May 1918 (New Style, from this point on) the Eighth Party Council of the Socialist Revolutionary Party convened in Moscow and decided to start an uprising against the Bolsheviks with the goal of reconvening the Constituent Assembly. While preparations were under way, the Czechoslovak Legions overthrew Bolshevik rule in Siberia, the Urals and the Volga region in late May-early June 1918 and the center of SR activity shifted there. On 8 June 1918, five Constituent Assembly members formed an All-Russian Constituent Assembly Committee (Komuch) in Samara and declared it the new supreme authority in the country.

The committee had the support of the Czechoslovak Legions and was able to spread its authority over much of the Volga-Kama region. However, most of the Siberia and Urals regions were controlled by a patchwork of ethnic, Cossack, military and liberal-rightist local governments, which constantly clashed with the committee. The Committee functioned until September 1918, eventually growing to about 90 Constituent Assembly members, when the so-called "State Conference" representing all the anti-Bolshevik local governments from the Volga to the Pacific Ocean formed a coalition "All-Russian Supreme Authority" (aka the "Ufa Directory") with the ultimate goal of re-convening the Constituent Assembly once the circumstances permitted:

In its activities the government will be unswervingly guided by the indisputable supreme rights of the Constituent Assembly. It will tirelessly ensure that the actions of all organs subordinate to the Provisional Government do not in any way tend to infringe the rights of the Constituent Assembly or hinder its resumption of work…It will present an account of its activities to the Constituent Assembly as soon as the Constituent Assembly declares that it has resumed operation. It will subordinate itself unconditionally to the Constituent Assembly, as the only supreme authority in the country.

The All-Russian Constituent Assembly Committee continued functioning as "Congress of Members of the Constituent Assembly" but had no real power, although the Directory pledged to support it:

All possible assistance to the Congress of Members of the Constituent Assembly, operating as a legal state organ, in its independent work of ensuring the relocation of members of the Constituent Assembly, hastening and preparing the resumption of activity by the Constituent Assembly in its present composition.

Initially, the agreement had the support of the Socialist Revolutionary Central Committee which delegated two of its right-wing members, Nikolai Avksentiev and Vladimir Zenzinov, to the five member Ufa Directory. However, when Viktor Chernov arrived in Samara on 19 September 1918, he was able to persuade the Central Committee to withdraw support from the Directory because he viewed it as too conservative and the SR presence there as insufficient. This put the Directory in a political vacuum and two months later, on 18 November 1918, it was overthrown by right-wing officers who made Admiral Alexander Kolchak the new leader.

On 30 August 1918, Socialist Revolutionary Fanny Kaplan unsuccessfully attempted to assassinate Vladimir Lenin. Kaplan referenced the Bolsheviks' growing authoritarianism, citing their forcible shutdown of the Constituent Assembly in January 1918, the elections to which they had lost. When it became clear that Kaplan would not implicate any accomplices, she was executed in Alexander Garden. The order was carried out by the commander of the Kremlin, the former Baltic sailor P. D. Malkov and a group of Latvian Bolsheviks on 3 September 1918 with a bullet to the back of the head. Her corpse was bundled into a barrel and set alight. The order came from Yakov Sverdlov, who only six weeks earlier had ordered the murder of the Tsar and his family.

== Final collapse ==
After the fall of the Ufa Directory, Chernov formulated what he called the "third path" against both the Bolsheviks and the liberal-rightist White Movement, but the SRs' attempts to assert themselves as an independent force were unsuccessful and the party, always fractious, began to disintegrate. On the Right, Avksentiev and Zenzinov went abroad with Kolchak's permission. On the Left, some SRs became reconciled with the Bolsheviks. Chernov tried to stage an uprising against Kolchak in December 1918, but it was put down. In February 1919, the SR Central Committee decided that the Bolsheviks were the lesser of two evils and gave up armed struggle against them. The Bolsheviks let the SR Central Committee re-establish itself in Moscow and start publishing a party newspaper in March 1919, but they were soon arrested by chekists and spent the rest of the Russian Civil War in prison. Chernov went undercover and eventually was forced to flee Russia while the imprisoned Central Committee members were put on trial in 1922 and their leaders sentenced to death, although their sentences were suspended.

With the main pro-Constituent Assembly party effectively out of the picture, the only remaining force that supported its re-convocation was the Entente Allies. On 26 May 1919, the Allies offered Kolchak their support predicated on a number of conditions, including free elections at all levels of government and reinstating the Constituent Assembly. On 4 June 1919, Kolchak accepted most of the conditions, but he refused to reconvene the Assembly elected in November 1917 since, he claimed, it had been elected under Bolshevik rule and the elections were not fully free. On 12 June 1919, the Allies deemed the response satisfactory and the demand for a reconvocation of the original Constituent Assembly was abandoned.

Both Kolchak and the leader of the White Movement in the South of Russia, General Anton Denikin, officially subscribed to the principle of "non-predetermination", i.e. they refused to determine what kind of social or political system Russia would have until after Bolshevism was defeated. Kolchak and Denikin made general promises to the effect that there would be no return to the past and that there would be some form of popular representation put in place. However, as one Russian journalist observed at the time:

[I]n Omsk itself… could be seen a political grouping who were prepared to promise anything that the Allies wanted whilst saying that "When we reach Moscow we can talk to them in a different tone".

Numerous memoirs published by the leaders of the White Movement after their defeat are inconclusive on the subject. There does not appear to be enough evidence to tell which group in the White Movement would have prevailed in case of a White victory and whether new Constituent Assembly elections would have been held, much less how restrictive they would have been.

After the Bolshevik victory in the Southern Front of the Civil War in late 1920, 38 members of the Constituent Assembly met in Paris in 1921 and formed an executive committee, which consisted of the Constitutional Democrats leader Pavel Milyukov, Progressive Party leader Aleksandr Konovalov, a Ufa Directory member Avksentiev and the head of the Provisional Government Kerensky. Like other emigre organizations, it proved ineffective.

== Historical disputes ==
According to the 1975 book Leninism under Lenin by Marcel Liebman, the Bolsheviks and their allies had a majority in the Soviets due to its different electoral system. Per the 1918 Soviet Constitution, each urban (and usually pro-Bolshevik) Soviet had 1 delegate per 25,000 voters. Each rural (usually pro-SR) Soviet was only allowed 1 delegate per 125,000 voters. The Bolsheviks justified closing down the Assembly by pointing out that the election did not take into account the split in the SR Party. A few weeks later the Left SR and Right SR got roughly equal votes in the Peasant Soviets. The Bolsheviks also argued that the Soviets were more democratic as delegates could be removed by their electors instantly rather than the parliamentary style of the Assembly where the elected members could only be removed after several years at the next election. The book states that all the elections to the Peasant and Urban Soviets were free and these Soviets then elected the All-Russian Congress of Soviets which chose the Soviet Government, the Second Congress taking place before the Assembly, the Third Congress just after.

Two more recent books using material from the opened Soviet archives, The Russian Revolution 1899-1919 by Richard Pipes and A People's Tragedy by Orlando Figes, give a different version. Pipes argues that the elections to the Second Congress were not fair, for example one Soviet with 1,500 members sent 5 delegates which was more than Kiev. He states that both the SRs and the Mensheviks declared this election illegal and unrepresentative. The books state that the Bolsheviks, two days after the dissolution of the Constituent Assembly, created a counter-assembly, the Third Congress of Soviets. They gave themselves and the Left Socialist-Revolutionaries 94% of the seats, far more than the results from the only nationwide parliamentary democratic election in Russia during this time. In a review of Pipes' work, historian Diane P. Koenker found Pipes' book to be (paradoxically) "closest in spirit to its Soviet counterpart, I. I. Mints's The History of Great October" since "[b]oth books embed political narrative in a teleological framework", "[b]oth books ignore [...] works that explore[s] social dimensions of the revolution", and "[b]oth regard Lenin as the spirit of the revolution" - though Mints "glorifies this revolution" while "Pipes condemns it". Specifically, she found Pipes' interpretation "fundamentally reactionary", sympathetic towards "the forces of order" while depicting Lenin as a "single-minded, ruthless and cowardly intellectual".

== Bibliography ==
- V. I. Lenin. Draft Decree on the Dissolution of the Constituent Assembly
- V. I. Lenin. Speech on the Dissolution of the Constituent Assembly
- Karl Kautsky. The Dictatorship of the Proletariat, chapter VI, Constituent Assembly and Soviet
- Leon Trotsky. Lenin, ch. 5
- Victor Serge. Year One of the Russian Revolution, ch. 4
- Tony Cliff. Lenin 3 – Revolution Besieged, ch. 3
- Max Shachtman. The Constituent Assembly
- The Russian Provisional Governments, eds. Robert Browder and Alexander Kerensky, Stanford University Press, 1961, in 3 volumes, 1875p.
- Ariadna Tyrkova-Williams. From Liberty to Brest-Litovsk, the First Year of the Russian Revolution, London, Macmillan, 1919, 526p. OCLC: 15796701 xii, 526p. See chapter XIII on the Constituent Assembly
- Boris Sokoloff. The White Nights, New York, Devin-Adair, 1956. See the chapter on unsuccessful attempts to defend the Constituent Assembly
- The Bolshevik Revolution, 1917-1918. Documents and Materials, eds. Frank Alfred Golder, James Bunyan and Harold Fisher, Stanford University Press; H. Milford, Oxford University Press, 1934. See the section on the Constituent Assembly
- Oliver Henry Radkey. Russia Goes to the Polls: The Election to the All-Russian Constituent Assembly, 1917, Ithaca, Cornell University Press, 1989, ISBN 978-0-8014-2360-4 vi, 171 p.
