= Abdication of Nicholas II =

1917 renunciation of the throne of the Russian Empire

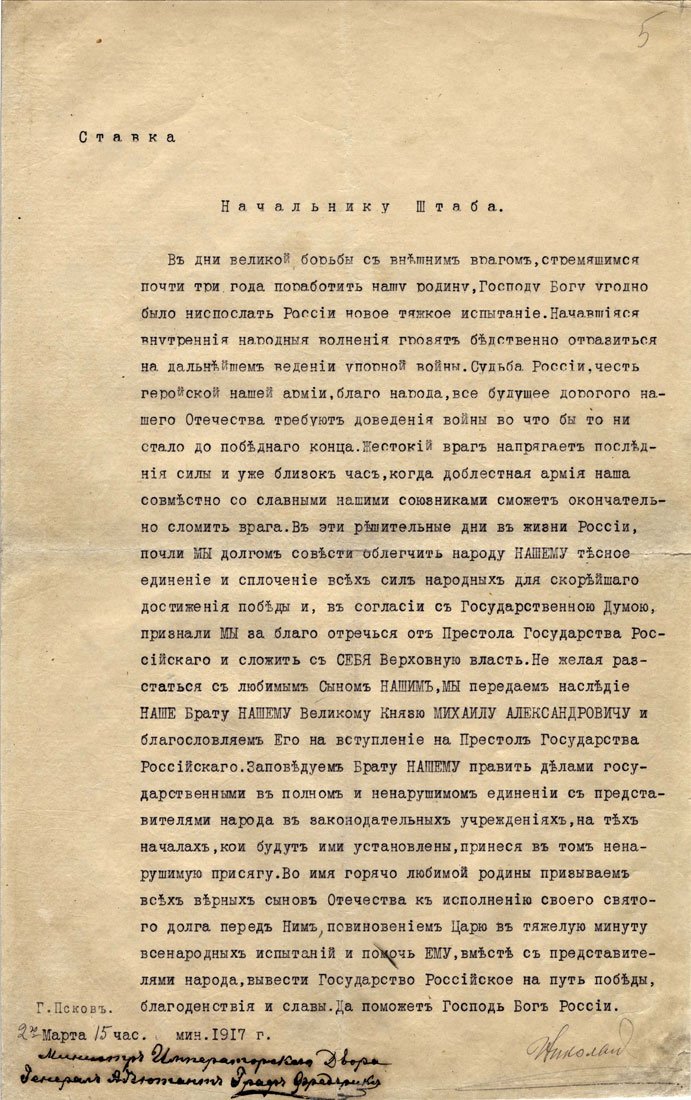
- Abdication statement of Nicholas II, signed 2 March 1917 O.S.
- Participants: Nicholas II; Grand Duke Michael Alexandrovich
- Outcome: Nicholas II formally abdicates and cedes the throne to Grand Duke Michael Alexandrovich, but he declines to accept it without a consensus of democratic action being reached by the Russian Constituent Assembly.

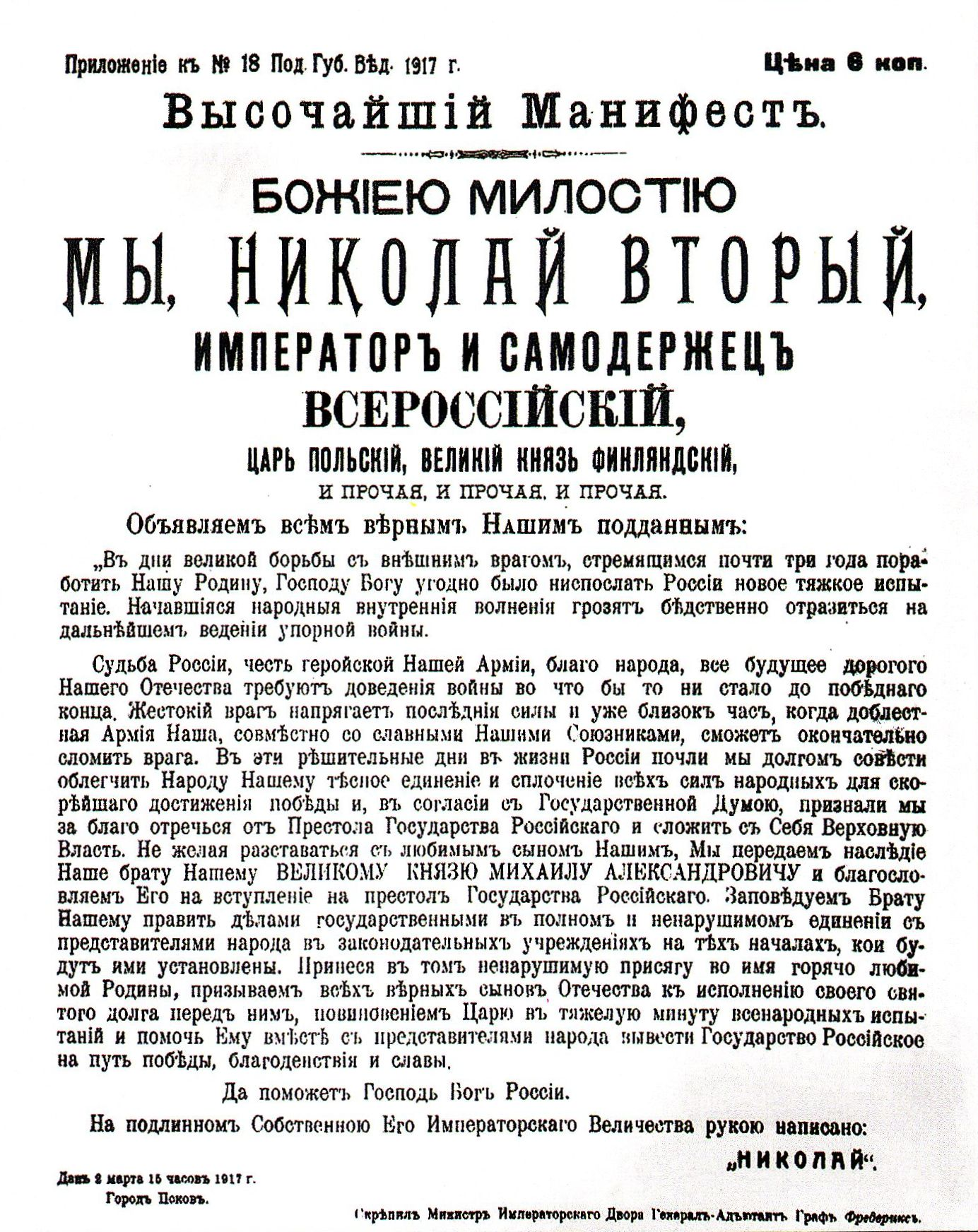
Manifesto of abdication.

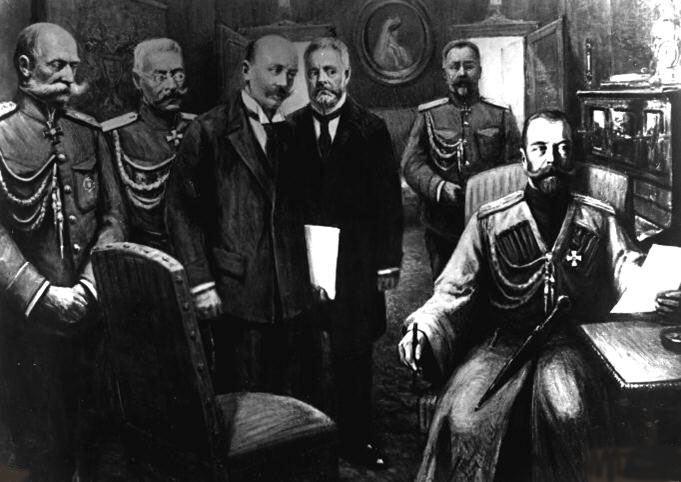
The abdication of Nicholas II on 2 March 1917 O.S. Pictured aboard the Imperial Train: Minister of the Imperial Court Baron Woldemar Freedericksz, Commander of the Northern Front General Nikolai Ruzsky, State Duma deputies Vasily Shulgin and Alexander Guchkov, Nicholas II. (State Historical Museum)

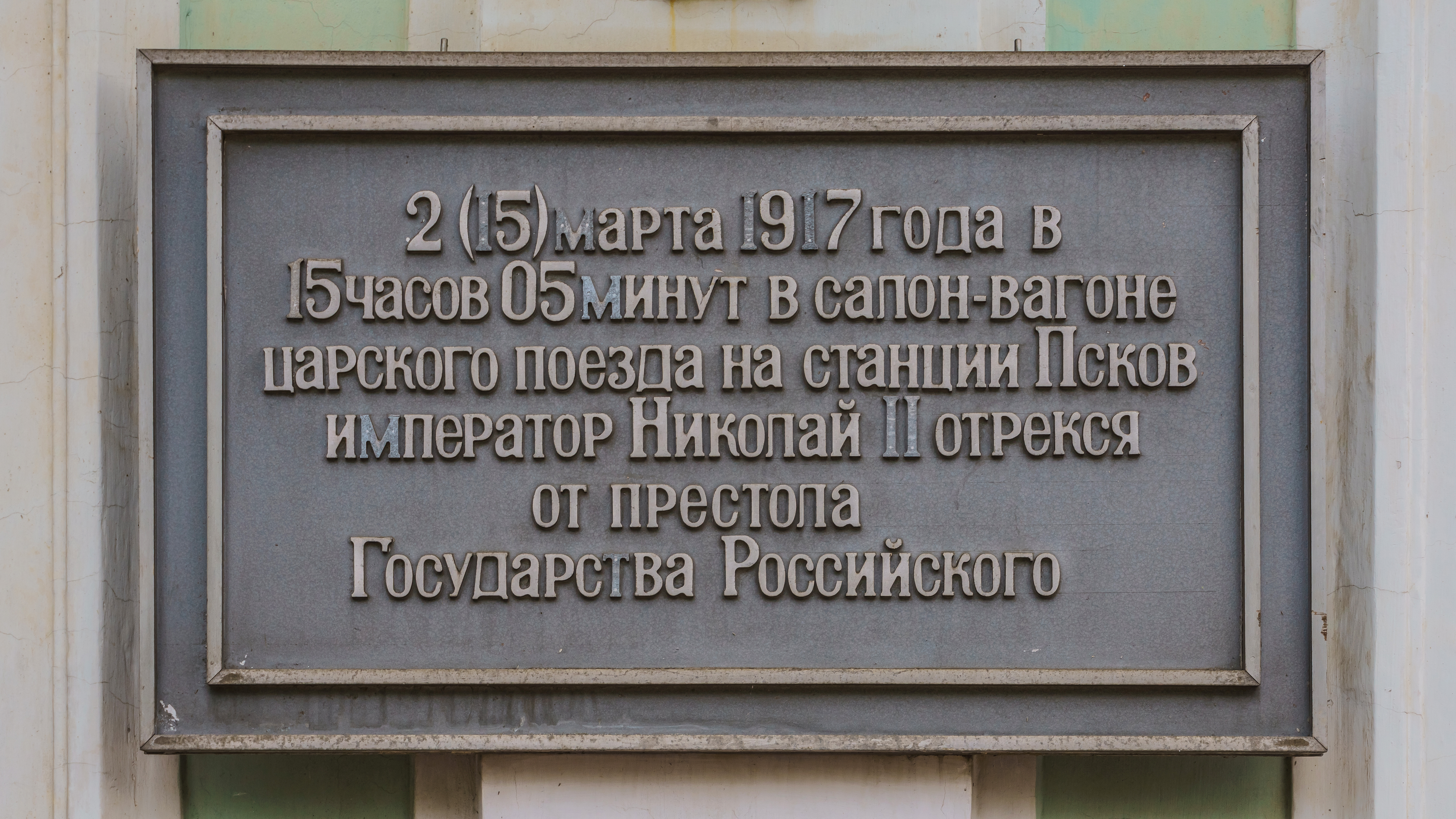
Memorial plaque on the Pskov Railway Station.

Emperor Nicholas II abdicated the throne of the Russian Empire on the 2nd of March (O.S.) / 15th of March (N.S.) 1917, in the Russian city of Pskov, in the midst of World War I and the February Revolution. The Emperor renounced the throne on behalf of himself and his son, Tsarevich Alexei Nikolaevich, in favor of his brother Grand Duke Michael Alexandrovich. The next day the Grand Duke refused to accept the imperial authority, stating that he would accept it only if that was the consensus of democratic action by the Russian Constituent Assembly, which shall define the form of government for Russia. With this decision, the rule of the 300-year-old House of Romanov ended. Power in Russia then passed to the Russian Provisional Government, signaling victory for the February Revolution.

== The manifesto of abdication ==
Summary

Nicholas II's abdication statement states that he is renouncing the throne in favour of his brother Grand Duke Michael Alexandrovich in order to facilitate the closest union possible so that Russia's war effort would be victorious. Nicholas II calls on the people to fulfill their duty to the fatherland and help guide the Russian Empire on the road to victory. The statement ends with a plea to God to help Russia.

English translation of the manifesto of abdication

In the days of the great struggle against the foreign enemies, who for nearly three years have tried to enslave our fatherland, the Lord God has been pleased to send down on Russia a new heavy trial. Internal popular disturbances threaten to have a disastrous effect on the future conduct of this persistent war. The destiny of Russia, the honor of our heroic army, the welfare of the people and the whole future of our dear fatherland demand that the war should be brought to a victorious conclusion whatever the cost. The cruel enemy is making his last efforts, and already the hour approaches when our glorious army together with our gallant allies will crush him. In these decisive days in the life of Russia, We thought it Our duty of conscience to facilitate for Our people the closest union possible and a consolidation of all national forces for the speedy attainment of victory. In agreement with the Imperial Duma We have thought it well to renounce the Throne of the Russian Empire and to lay down the supreme power. As We do not wish to part from Our beloved son, We transmit the succession to Our brother, the Grand Duke Michael Alexandrovich, and give Him Our blessing to mount the Throne of the Russian Empire. We direct Our brother to conduct the affairs of the nation with the representatives of the people in the legislative bodies on those principles which will be established by them, and on which He will take an inviolable oath. In the name of Our dearly beloved homeland, We call on Our faithful sons of the fatherland to fulfill their sacred duty to the fatherland, to obey the Tsar in the heavy moment of national trials, and to help Him, together with the representatives of the people, to guide the Russian Empire on the road to victory, welfare, and glory. May the Lord God help Russia!

== See also ==
- Abdication of Wilhelm II
- Russian Revolution
- Russian Provisional Government

== Bibliography ==
- Beckett, Ian F.W. (2007). The Great war (2 ed.). Longman. ISBN 978-1-4058-1252-8.
- Browder, Robert Paul; Kerensky, Aleksandr Fyodorovich (1961). The Russian Provisional Government, 1917: documents. Stanford University Press. ISBN 978-0-8047-0023-8.
