= Decree on the system of government of Russia (1918) =

1918 proposed constitution for Russia

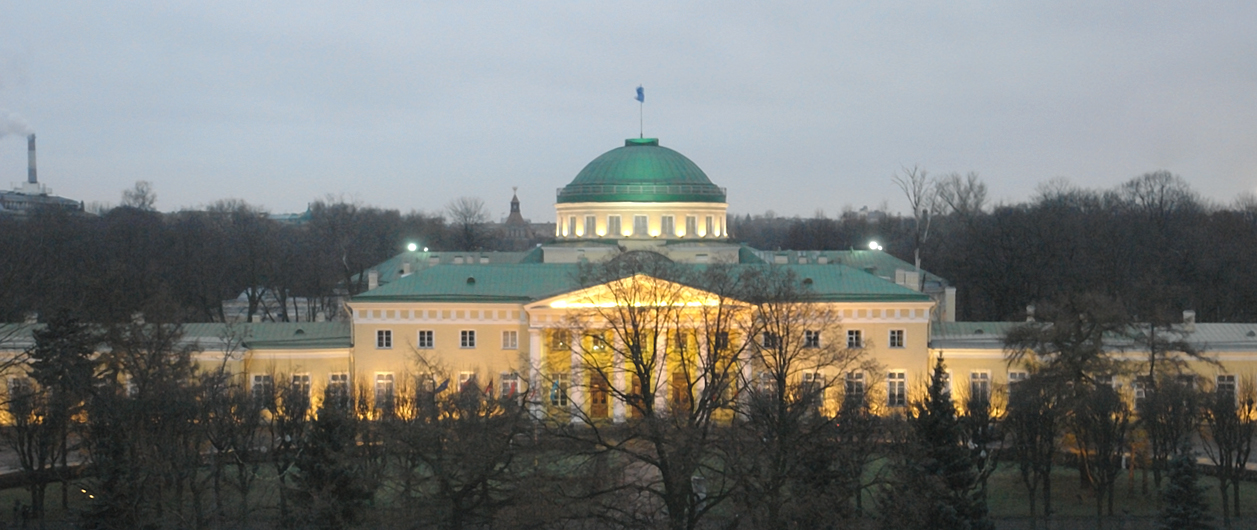
- Tauride Palace
- Created: 18 January 1918
- Location: Petrograd, Russia (Note: Place where document signed, not location of copies.)
- Purpose: Constitution for Russia

The Decree on the system of government of Russia (Note: Russian: Постановление о государственном устройстве в России, romanized: Postanovleniye o gosudarstvennom ustroystve v Rossii.) was a basis of the new constitution declared in 1918 in Russia during the Russian Revolution of 1917, during the five-month interregnum between the downfall of the Alexander Kerensky government and the official declaration of the Russian Socialist Federative Soviet Republic. It was formally declared on 18 January 1918 when the democratically elected Russian Constituent Assembly drafted and adopted the "Resolution on the form of government of Russia," declaring Russia to be a democratic federal republic called the "Russian Democratic Federative Republic." However, the Assembly was dissolved on the same day by the Bolshevik-controlled All-Russian Central Executive Committee, meaning the declaration was not carried out as it was considered to be without legal force.

== Governmental structure ==
According to the constitution, Russia was to be declared a democratic federal republic. The fundamental basis of the state was representative democracy and federation of both national and territorial autonomous oblasts. This was in contrast to the Decembrist constitution project, which proposed a federal constitutional monarchy on an economic basis. For the first time, the unitary structure of Russia would have been officially abolished and the country declared a federation, marking the start of the federalist period in Russian history.

=== Civil rights and duties ===
The Constitution granted universal suffrage for all citizens of the Republic aged 20 or older. This would have been five years lower than in the former Russian Empire.

Most civil duties, such as conscription and taxes, were inherited from the legislation of the Russian Empire.

=== Head of state ===
The head of state would have been the President of the Russian Democratic Federative Republic, elected for a one-year term by a majority vote in parliament involving the deputies of both chambers. Presidential powers were nearly identical to those of the Emperor:

- Appointment of several government officials and their removal of office;
- Commander-in-chief of the Russian Army;
- Decisions on the foreign policy of Russia;
- Right to propose laws;
- Control over governmental structures member and functioning;
- Control over law enforcement;
- Exercising and overseeing management in Russia.

The President would have been responsible for his work before the parliament. A similar approach to presidential power, there termed Ersatzkaiser, was later used in the German constitution of 1919.

Due to the cancellation of the Constitution, no person was ever elected to this office.

=== Legislation ===
According to the final draft of the Constitution, adopted in Paris on 20 January 1920, legislative power was to be held by a bicameral parliament. The State Council of the Russian Democratic Federative Republic would form the upper house, elected by regional legislatures (sejms), while the State Duma of the Russian Democratic Federative Republic would form the lower house, directly elected by citizens of the Republic.

Constituent powers to create a new constitution and change the type of government were allocated to the Russian Constituent Assembly.

== See also ==
- Bibliography of the Russian Revolution and Civil War § Government
- Soviet Russia Constitution of 1918
