= Directorate (Russia) =

Russian provisional government

Kerensky Second Government
- 11th Cabinet of Russia

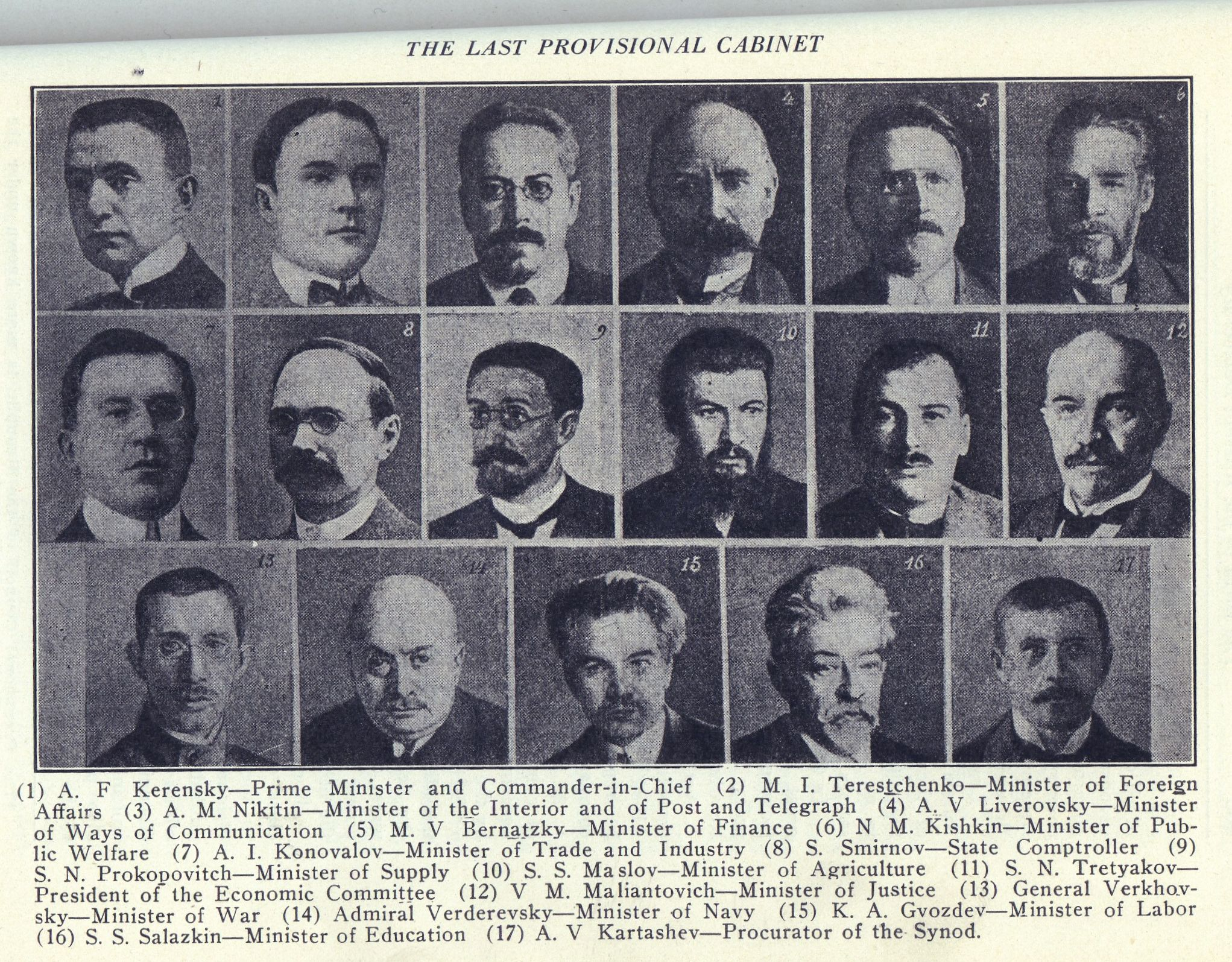
- Date formed: 14 September 1917
- Date dissolved: 8 October 1917

People and organisations
- Head of state: Grand Duke Michael (conditionally); Alexander Kerensky (de facto)
- Head of government: Alexander Kerensky
- Member parties: Socialist-Revolutionaries; Mensheviks; Progressive Bloc
- Status in legislature: Coalition
- Opposition cabinet: Executive Committee of Petrograd Soviet
- Opposition parties: Bolsheviks; Left Socialist-Revolutionaries
- Opposition leader: Nikolay Chkheidze / Leon Trotsky

History
- Incoming formation: Kerensky I
- Outgoing formation: Kerensky III
- Predecessor: Alexander Kerensky
- Successor: Alexander Kerensky

The Directorate (Kerensky Second Government) was the short-lived transitional government of Russia during the Russian Revolution. It consisted of five main ministers and lasted for about three weeks.

== Members ==
Post	Name	Party
Minister-President	Alexander Kerensky	Socialist-Revolutionary Party
Minister of Foreign Affairs	Mikhail Tereshchenko	Non-party
Minister of Internal Affairs, Post and Telegraph	Alexei Nikitin	Menshevik
Minister of War	Alexander Verkhovsky	Socialist-Revolutionary Party
Minister of Navy	Dmitry Verderevsky	

== History ==
The Directorate was founded by decree of the Russian Provisional Government on 14 September 1917. The Directorate was responsible for "public affairs until the establishment of the Cabinet." The Directorate was created to resolve the crisis stemming from the Kornilov Affair and the collapse of the Second Provisional Government as the Constitutional Democratic Party members of the government left the Cabinet.

On October 8, with the formation of the 3rd coalition, the Directorate was abolished.

During the Directorate on September 14, Russia was proclaimed a republic and the State Duma of the Russian Empire was dissolved.

During September 27 through October 5 at the Alexandrine Theater convened the All-Russian Democratic Conference which at the end formed the so-called Pre-parliament or the Provisional Council of the Russian Republic.

== See also ==
- Russian Provisional Government
- French Directory, a similar institution during the French Revolution
