= Provisional Council of the Russian Republic =

Legislative assembly of the Russian Republic

Provisional Council of the Russian Republic Временный совет Российской республики (Russian)
- Legislative body in the Russian Republic

Type
- Type: Unicameral

History
- Established: 3 October 1917
- Disbanded: 7 November 1917
- Preceded by: State Duma
- Succeeded by: Russian Constituent Assembly

Structure
- Seats: 313 members 555 members
- Political groups: Socialist Revolutionaries: 135 seats Mensheviks: 92 seats Popular Socialists: 30 seats Kadets: 75 seats Bolsheviks: 58 seats Others: 165 seats

Meeting place
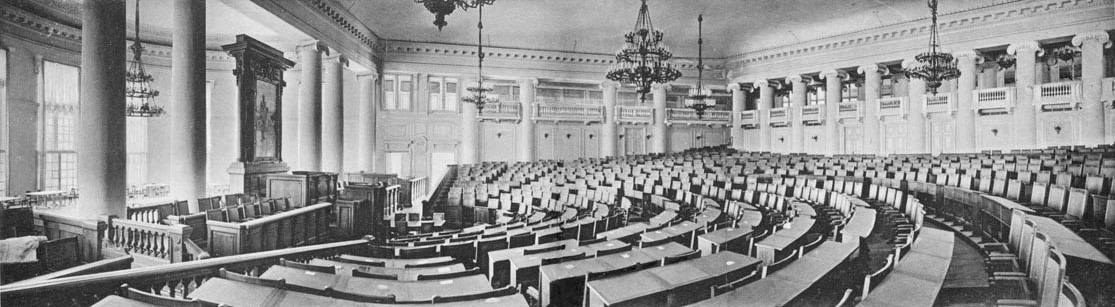
- Tauride Palace, Petrograd

Provisional Council of the Russian Republic (Russian: Временный совет Российской республики, (also known as Pre-parliament) was a legislative assembly of the Russian Republic. It convened at the Marinsky Palace on October 20, 1917, but was dissolved by the Bolsheviks on November, 7/8, 1917. It was headed by a presidium of five members with Nikolay Avksentiev (Social-Revolutionary) as president.

== History ==
On September 19 (October 2), 1917, the Democratic Conference adopted a resolution against the creation of a government in coalition with the Kadets, and the majority of the Socialist Revolutionaries and Mensheviks voted against the coalition. On September 20 (October 3), the Presidium of the Seating decided to delegate out the All-Russian Democratic Council, also the Provisional Council of the Russian Republic (Pre-Parliament), in proportion to the number of its groups and factions. He was called upon to become, before the Constituent Assembly, a representative to which the Provisional Government had report. The first meeting of the Pre-Parliament was held on September 23 (October 6).

== Composition ==
First, the total number of the members of the Pre-Parliament had to be 313 (15% of each faction and group of the Democratic Seating). However, the new Provisional Government, formed on September 25 (October 8), changed it composition; representatives of the so-called qualifying organizations and institutions (cadet parties, business associations, etc.) were also included in the Pre-Parliament. The number of the members increased to 555. According to incomplete data, it included 135 Socialist Revolutionaries, 92 Mensheviks, 30 Popular Socialists, 75 Kadets; the Bolsheviks received 58 mandates. According to the testimony of the leader of the cadets Pavel Milyukov, at the first meeting, “the members of the Council spoke to each other, looking around: it’s good if the Constituent Assembly would be no worse than this!” “The Constitution of the Pre-Parliament,” the RSDLP leader of the Pre-Parliament Fyodor Dan later wrote, “due to the resistance of the government, was disfigured significantly in comparison with the first provisions issued by the Central Election Committee. Contrary to these provisions, the Council of the Republic formally received only the rights of an advisory body”.

Nikolai Avksentiev, right-wing Socialist Revolutionary, was elected as a chairman of the Pre-Parliament.

== Sources ==
- The History of the Russian Revolution
