= 1918 Constitution of Soviet Russia =

First constitution of Soviet Russia

All-Russian Congress of Soviets
- Long title: Constitution of the Russian Socialist Federative Soviet Republic
- Territorial extent: Russian Socialist Federative Soviet Republic
- Enacted by: All-Russian Congress of Soviets
- Signed by: Vladimir Lenin
- Effective: 10 July 1918; 107 years ago
- Repealed: 11 May 1925; 101 years ago

Repealed by
- Russian constitution of 1925
- Status: Repealed

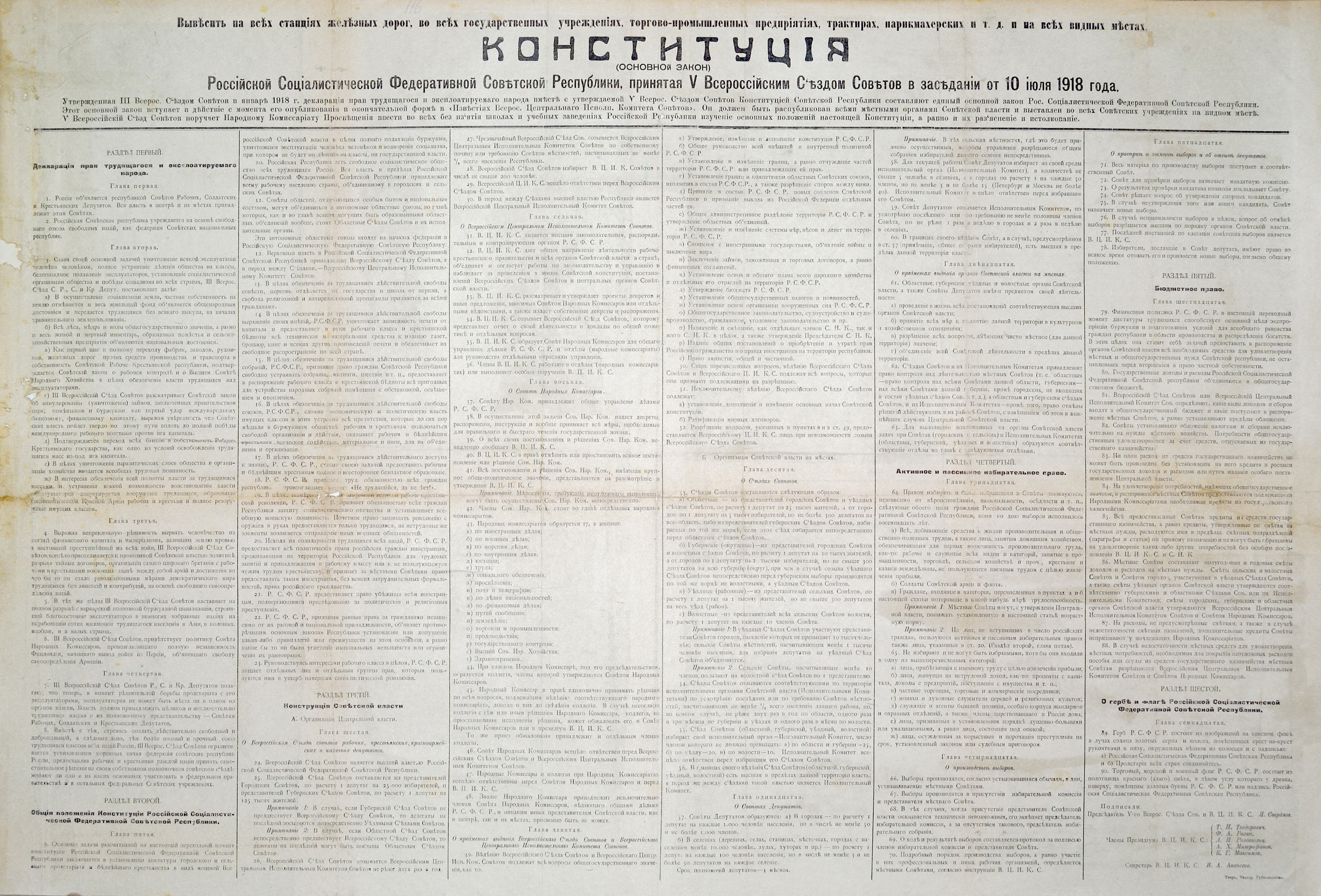
The constitution

The Constitution of the Russian Socialist Federative Soviet Republic was the world's first communist state constitution. It incorporated the results of the October Revolution of 1917 into the law and gave the name to the state: the Russian Socialist Federative Soviet Republic. This constitution, which was ratified soon after the Declaration Of Rights Of The Working And Exploited People, formally recognized the working class as the ruling class of Russia according to the principle of the dictatorship of the proletariat, therein making the Russian Soviet Republic the world's first constitutionally socialist state.

== History ==
The ultimate aims of the state were outlined as: "the abolition of the exploitation of men by men, the entire abolition of the division of the people into classes, the suppression of exploiters, [and] the establishment of a socialist society." The constitution stated that a historic alliance had been formed between the workers and peasants, who together would govern the state through the soviets. The constitution explicitly denied political power to higher classes of Russian society or to those who supported the White armies in the Civil War (1918–21). To prevent the higher classes from re-claiming state power, the first article called for all workers and peasants to be armed and organized into a Red Army while the higher classes be fully disarmed.

Supreme power rested with the All-Russian Congress of Soviets, made up of deputies from local soviets across Russia. The steering committee of the Congress of Soviets—known as the Central Executive Committee—acted as the "supreme organ of power" between sessions of the congress and as the collective presidency of the state.

The congress elected the Council of People's Commissars (Sovnarkom, Sovet narodnykh kommissarov) as the administrative arm of the young government and defined its responsibilities as "general administration of the affairs of the state". (The Sovnarkom had exercised governmental authority from November 1917 until the adoption of the 1918 constitution July 10 by the Congress of Soviets.)

One of the first Soviet iterations of a perennial biblical phrase appeared in Article 18, which declares labour to be the duty of all citizens of the Republic, and sloganeers: 'He who does not work, neither shall he eat!'

Importantly, the 1918 Russian Constitution's main principles served as a precursor to the ensuing constitutions of both united and autonomous Soviet republics. They were recognized as fundamental to the 1924 Soviet Constitution, which was the formative document of the Union of Soviet Socialist Republics.

== See also ==
- Bibliography of the Russian Revolution and Civil War § Government
- 1924 constitution of the Soviet Union
- 1936 constitution of the Soviet Union
- 1977 constitution of the Soviet Union
- Russian constitution of 1978
- Russian State (1918–1920)
- Decree on the system of government of Russia (1918)
