= Outline of the October Revolution =

Overview of and topical guide to the 1917 October Revolution in Russia

October Revolution
- Part of the Russian Revolution and the Revolutions of 1917–1923
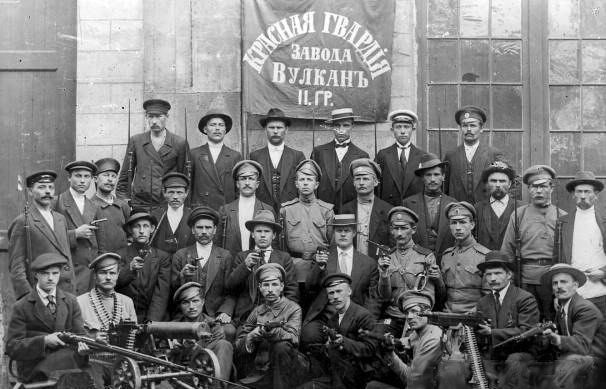
- Red Guards at the Vulkan factory in Petrograd, 1917
Date	25–26 October [N.S. 7–8 November] 1917
Location	Petrograd, Russian Republic
Result	Bolshevik victory; Overthrow of the Provisional Government and end of dual power; Transfer of power to the Congress of Soviets and formation of the Council of People's Commissars under Vladimir Lenin; Dissolution of the Constituent Assembly on 6 January [N.S. 19 January] 1918; Onset of the Russian Civil War

The following outline is provided as an overview of and topical guide to the October Revolution in Russia.

The October Revolution (Russian: Октябрьская революция), known in Soviet historiography as the Great October Socialist Revolution, was the second of two revolutions in Russia in 1917. Its decisive events took place in and around Petrograd (now Saint Petersburg), then the Russian capital, where the Military Revolutionary Committee of the Petrograd Soviet occupied the government's key installations and overthrew the Provisional Government headed by Alexander Kerensky.

On 10 October [N.S. 23 October] 1917 (Note: Russia used the Julian calendar (Old Style, O.S.) until 31 January 1918; the next day was 14 February 1918 in the Gregorian calendar (New Style, N.S.). Dates in this outline before that change are Old Style, with the New Style equivalent in brackets; dates after it are New Style. Where only a month or a year is given, it follows the same format; dates of events outside Russia are New Style and marked accordingly.) the Bolshevik Central Committee resolved by ten votes to two that an armed uprising was "inevitable"; the Petrograd Soviet then created the Military Revolutionary Committee, which by the third week of October had displaced the district command and taken effective control of the capital's garrison. When Kerensky moved against the Bolshevik press on 24 October, the committee seized the telegraph, the bridges, the railway stations, the State Bank and the telephone exchange, and on the evening of 25 October besieged the Winter Palace. The ministers were arrested there at 2:10 a.m. on 26 October. Meeting at the Smolny Institute while the palace fell, the Second All-Russian Congress of Soviets proclaimed the transfer of power to the soviets, adopted the Decree on Peace and the Decree on Land, and elected the Council of People's Commissars under Vladimir Lenin.

== Main articles ==
- October Revolution – overview of the 1917 October Revolution in Russia, planned and carried out by the Bolsheviks under the leadership of Vladimir Lenin.

== Background ==
- World War I – major armed conflict between the Allied Powers and the Central Powers. (Note: The principal Allied Powers were the French Third Republic, the British Empire, the Russian Empire, the Kingdom of Italy, the Empire of Japan and the United States. The main Central Powers were the German Empire, Austria-Hungary and the Ottoman Empire.) Russia suffered social upheaval during the war, followed by a political and military collapse in 1917 that led to the abdication of Nicholas II and the revolution.
- Eastern Front (World War I) – the Russian theater of World War I.
- 1905 Russian Revolution – wave of political and social unrest that preceded the revolutions of 1917. (Note: See Outline and timeline of the Russian Revolution of 1905 for additional information.)
- February Revolution – mass uprising in Petrograd that forced the abdication of Nicholas II and established the Russian Provisional Government.

== Events ==
- Kerensky–Krasnov uprising – failed attempt by Alexander Kerensky and Pyotr Krasnov to retake Petrograd on 26–31 October [N.S. 8–13 November] 1917.
- Junker mutiny – one day uprising of Petrograd's military cadets on 29 October [N.S. 11 November] 1917.
- Vikzhel negotiations – talks between the railway union and Bolsheviks after the seizure of power to replace the all-Bolshevik government with a coalition.
- 1917 Russian Constituent Assembly election – election to the Russian Constituent Assembly held on 12 November [N.S. 25 November] 1917.
- Berlin Conference (December 6–7, 1917) – conference called by Wilhelm II on 6–7 December 1917 which dictated terms for an armistice with the Bolshevik government.

== Places ==
- Petrograd – the Russian capital, known as Saint Petersburg before 1914, became Leningrad on January 26, 1924 and again Saint Petersburg from 1991 to the present.
- Winter Palace – Romanov imperial residence in Petrograd (now the Hermitage Museum) that was later the headquarters of the Russian Provisional Government. It was seized by the Bolsheviks on the night of 25–26 October [N.S. 7–8 November] 1917.
- Smolny Institute – former school for noblewomen, taken over as the headquarters of the Bolsheviks.
- Finland Station – Petrograd rail station where Vladimir Lenin arrived from exile on 3 April [N.S. 16 April] 1917.
- Petrograd Military District – military district.

== Organizations ==
=== Political ===
==== Governing assemblies ====
- Russian Provisional Government – government formed after the February Revolution and overthrown in the October Revolution.
- Provisional Council of the Russian Republic – advisory assembly, also known as the Pre-parliament, which convened on 7 October [N.S. 20 October] 1917 and was dissolved by the Bolsheviks on 25 October [N.S. 7 November].
- Petrograd Soviet – council of workers' and soldiers' deputies forming the Military Revolutionary Committee.
- Russian Constituent Assembly – a constituent assembly convened in the Russian Republic after the October Revolution and dissolved after a single session on 6 January [N.S. 19 January] 1918.
- Congress of Soviets of Russia – the governing body of Soviet Russia.
- All-Russian Central Executive Committee – standing body elected by the Congress of Soviets of Russia to act on its behalf between sessions.
- All-Russian Central Executive Committee of the Soviets of Workers' and Soldiers' Deputies – the committee elected by the first All-Russian Congress of Soviets, which met from 3 June [N.S. 16 June] 1917; dominated by Mensheviks and Socialist Revolutionaries and dissolved after the October Revolution.
- Council of People's Commissars of the Russian Soviet Federative Socialist Republic – the government created by the Second Congress of Soviets on 26 October [N.S. 8 November] 1917.
- Government of Vladimir Lenin – the administration formed after the Bolshevik seizure of power, which dissolved the Constituent Assembly and signed the Treaty of Brest-Litovsk.
- Lenin's First and Second Government – cabinets of people's commissars headed by Lenin from 26 October [N.S. 8 November] 1917.
- Committee for the Salvation of the Homeland and Revolution – anti-Bolshevik group formed in Petrograd on 25–26 October [N.S. 7–8 November] 1917 by members of the city council.
- Russian Soviet Federative Socialist Republic – the Russian state established by the Bolsheviks, replacing the Russian Republic created after the February Revolution.
- Labour Commune of Volga Germans – autonomous territory created by the Volga Germans in 1918 and reorganized as the Volga German Autonomous Soviet Socialist Republic in 1924.

==== Congresses and meetings ====
- Second All-Russian Congress of Soviets of Workers' and Soldiers' Deputies – congress that met at the Smolny Institute on 25–27 October [N.S. 7–9 November] 1917, and adopted the decrees on peace and land, and formed the Council of People's Commissars.
- Extraordinary All-Russia Congress Of Soviets Of Peasants' Deputies – congress that met in the weeks after the seizure of power, at which the Left SRs broke with the Right SRs, and moved toward a colalition with the Bolsheviks.
- Third All-Russian Congress of Workers', Soldiers' and Peasants Deputies' Soviets – met on 10–18 January [N.S. 23–31 January] 1918.
- Third All-Russia Congress of Soviets of Peasants' Deputies – met on 13 January [N.S. 26 January] 1918 and consolidated the soviets with the workers, soldiers, and peasants councils.

==== Political parties and movements ====
- Bolsheviks – radical faction of the Marxist Russian Social Democratic Labour Party, led by Vladimir Lenin, which split from the Mensheviks at the 2nd Congress of the Russian Social Democratic Labour Party in 1903. The Bolsheviks seized power in the October Revolution and was later renamed the Russian Communist Party.
- Mensheviks – moderate faction of the Russian Social Democratic Labour Party, which split from the Bolsheviks in 1903. Its leaders, such as Julius Martov and Pavel Axelrod, opposed Lenin's vision for the party.
- Socialist Revolutionary Party – agrarian socialists, supporters of democratic socialism, split in 1917 into "Left SRs" and "Right SRs".
- Left Socialist-Revolutionaries (the "Left SRs") – agrarian socialists who split from the Socialist Revolutionary Party over its support for the Russian Provisional Government. They later entered a coalition with the Bolsheviks after the October Revolution.
- Constitutional Democratic Party (the Kadets or K-Ds) – moderate party, opposed to both monarchist conservatives and radical socialists, they advocated for a Western-style constitutional monarchy and drew support from moderate conservatives and moderate socialists.
- Armenian Revolutionary Federation – Armenian nationalist and socialist party, founded in 1890.
- Ukrainian Socialist-Revolutionary Party – Ukrainian agrarian socialist party founded in April 1917.

=== Military ===
- Military Revolutionary Committee – the Bolshevik-led military councils.
- Petrograd Military Revolutionary Committee – armed committee of the Petrograd Soviet, set up on 16 October [N.S. 29 October] 1917, led the Bolshevik uprising in Petrograd.
- Moscow Military Revolutionary Committee – armed committee of the Moscow Soviet that led the Bolshevik uprising in Moscow.
- Bolshevik Military Organizations – the party's military organizations, active from 1905 to 1918.
- Red Guards (Russia) – Bolshevik revolutionary paramilitary organizations, absorbed into the Red Army in 1918.
- Central Committee of the Baltic Fleet – the elected committee of Baltic Fleet sailors, formed on 28–30 April [N.S. 11–13 May] 1917 under Pavel Dybenko and abolished on 31 January [N.S. 13 February] 1918.
- Political Directorate of the Soviet Army and Soviet Navy – the council that ran Bolshevik political agitation and organization in the armed forces.
- Red Army (originally the Workers' and Peasants' Red Army) – established in January 1918 and organized by Leon Trotsky as War Commissar to fight the forces collectively known as the White Army.
- White Army – collective name for the anti-Bolshevik armed groups, they ranged from monarchists to constitutional democrats.

=== Other organizations ===
- Vikzhel – the Executive Committee of the Railway Workers' Union, which advocated for a broad socialist coalition government after the October revolution and was dissolved by the Bolsheviks in March 1918.
- All-Russian Council for Workers' Control – body created under the decree on workers' control created shortly after the revolution, and later absorbed into the Supreme Soviet of the National Economy.
- Istpart – commission established in 1920 to collect and publish the history of the October Revolution and the Bolshevik party. It was merged into the Lenin Institute in 1928.

== People ==
=== Monarchists ===
- Nicholas II (1868–executed 1918) – the last Tsar.

=== Provisional Government ===
- Alexander Kerensky (1881–1970) – Minister-Chairman of the Provisional Government
- Nikolai Kishkin (1864–1930) – Kadet minister
- Mikhail Tereshchenko (1886–1956) – foreign minister
- Peter Palchinsky (1875–executed 1929) – deputy minister

=== Anti-Bolshevik commanders ===
- Georgy Polkovnikov (1883–executed 1918) – commander of the Petrograd Military District
- Pyotr Krasnov (1869–executed 1947) – Cossack general

=== Bolsheviks ===
- Vladimir Lenin (1870–1924) – founder of the Bolsheviks and chairman of the Council of People's Commissars
- Leon Trotsky (1879– assassinated 1940) – chairman of the Petrograd Soviet
- Joseph Stalin (1878–1953) – Central Committee member and commissar for nationalities
- Yakov Sverdlov (1885–1919) – chairman of the All-Russian Central Executive Committee
- Lev Kamenev (1883–executed 1936) – chairman of the Second Congress of Soviets
- Grigory Zinoviev (1883–executed 1936) – Central Committee member
- Nikolai Bukharin (1888–executed 1938) – editor of Pravda
- Alexei Rykov (1881–executed 1938) – commissar for internal affairs
- Viktor Nogin (1878–1924) – chairman of the Moscow Military Revolutionary Committee
- Vladimir Milyutin (1884–executed 1937) – commissar for agriculture
- Anatoly Lunacharsky (1875–1933) – commissar for education
- Grigori Sokolnikov (1888–1939) – Central Committee member
- Felix Dzerzhinsky (1877–1926) – member of the Military Revolutionary Committee
- Nikolai Podvoisky (1880–1948) – commissar for military affairs
- Vladimir Antonov-Ovseenko (1883–executed 1938) – secretary of the Military Revolutionary Committee
- Andrei Bubnov (1883–executed 1938) – commissar for railways
- Moisei Uritsky (1873–1918) – member of the Military Revolutionary Committee
- Nikolai Krylenko (1885–executed 1938) – commissar for war
- Vladimir Nevsky (1876–executed 1937) – Bolshevik military organizer in Petrograd
- Konstantin Eremeev (1874–1931) – Red Guard organizer
- Nikolai Muralov (1877–executed 1937) – chief commissar of the Moscow Military District
- Ivar Smilga (1892–executed 1937) – Bolshevik leader in Finland
- Pavel Dybenko (1889–executed 1938) – chairman of the Central Committee of the Baltic Fleet and naval commissar
- Fyodor Raskolnikov (1892–1939) – Kronstadt agitator
- Jēkabs Peterss (1886–executed 1938) – member of the Petrograd Military Revolutionary Committee
- Alexandra Kollontai (1872–1952) – commissar for social welfare

=== Socialist Revolutionaries ===
- Viktor Chernov (1873–1952) – SR leader

==== Left Socialist-Revolutionaries ====
- Pavel Lazimir (1891–1920) – chairman of the Military Revolutionary Committee
- Maria Spiridonova (1884–executed 1941) – Left SR leader
- Boris Kamkov (1885–executed 1938) – Left SR leader

=== Mensheviks ===
- Julius Martov (1873–1923) – Menshevik leader

=== Other people ===
- Abram Gots (1882–1940) – member of the Committee for the Salvation of the Homeland and Revolution
- Nikolai Avksentiev (1878–1943) – organizer of the Committee for the Salvation of the Homeland and Revolution

== Aftermath ==
- Murder of the Romanov family – the execution of Emperor Nicholas II, Empress Alexandra and their children Olga, Tatiana, Maria, Anastasia and Alexei, together with the household servants who had accompanied them to Yekaterinburg.
- Treaty of Brest-Litovsk – the separate peace with the Central Powers signed on 3 March 1918, which took Russia out of World War I.

== Publications ==
- Pravda – Bolshevik newspaper.
- Izvestia – newspaper of the Petrograd Soviet and then of the Central Executive Committee.
- Novaya Zhizn – Petrograd daily published by Mensheviks from April 1917 to July 1918.

=== Decrees and declarations ===
- Decree on Peace – decree adopted by the Second Congress of Soviets on 26 October [N.S. 8 November] 1917, proposing an immediate peace without annexations or indemnities.
- Decree on Land – decree adopted by the Second Congress of Soviets on 26 October [N.S. 8 November] 1917, abolishing private landownership and transferring the landed estates to the peasantry.
- Petrograd formula – the demand for a peace "without annexations or indemnities, on the basis of the self-determination of peoples", issued by the Petrograd Soviet in 1917.

== Art and literature ==
=== Non-fiction ===
- Ten Days That Shook the World – the American journalist John Reed's eyewitness account, published in 1919.

=== Literature ===
- The Twelve – Aleksandr Blok's long poem of 1918, written in the months just after the revolution.
- Doctor Zhivago – Boris Pasternak's novel, refused publication at home and first printed in Italy in 1957.

=== Films ===
- October: Ten Days That Shook the World – Sergei Eisenstein and Grigori Aleksandrov's silent film of 1928, commissioned for the tenth anniversary.
- The Great Dawn – Mikheil Chiaureli's 1938 treatment of Lenin and Stalin at the taking of the Winter Palace.
- The Vyborg Side – the last of Grigori Kozintsev and Leonid Trauberg's Maxim films, released in 1939.
- October Days – Sergei Vasilyev's 1958 drama of the Central Committee arguments that preceded the rising.

=== Music ===
- Symphony No. 2 – Dmitri Shostakovich's choral symphony "To October", written for the tenth anniversary in 1927.
- Symphony No. 12 – Shostakovich's "The Year 1917", first heard in Leningrad in 1961.

=== Art and monuments ===
- Winter Palace Taken – Vladimir Serov's canvas of 1954, showing a soldier and a Red Guard on the Jordan Staircase after the palace had fallen; in the Tretyakov Gallery.
- Monument to the Heroes of the Revolution – memorial in Novosibirsk, opened on 7 November 1922.

== Miscellaneous ==
- Commissars – the title carried by political officers in the Soviet forces and administration.
- Anarchists – a current that saw in 1917 the chance of a stateless society, worked alongside the Bolsheviks in October and was suppressed by them soon after.
- Smolny Institute of Noble Maidens – the girls' school that occupied the Smolny buildings before 1917.

== Bibliography ==
- Bibliography of the Russian Revolution and Civil War § October Revolution

The works below all cover the October Revolution and carry extensive bibliographies for further research.

- Smith, S. A. (2017). Russia in Revolution: An Empire in Crisis, 1890 to 1928. New York: Oxford University Press.
- Engelstein, L. (2017). Russia in Flames: War, Revolution, Civil War, 1914–1921. New York: Oxford University Press.
- Figes, O. (1996). A People's Tragedy: A History of the Russian Revolution. New York: Viking.
- McMeekin, S. (2017). The Russian Revolution: A New History. New York: Basic Books.
- Smele, J. (2016). The "Russian" Civil Wars, 1916–1926: Ten Years That Shook the World. New York: Oxford University Press. (Note: Contains an extensive 46 pp. bibliography of English and non-English works on the "Russian" Civil Wars.)

== See also ==
- Category:October Revolution
- Index of articles related to the Russian Revolution and Civil War
- Outline of the Russian Revolution and Civil War
- Outline of the February Revolution
- Bibliography of the Russian Revolution and Civil War
