= Nikolai Sergeevsky =

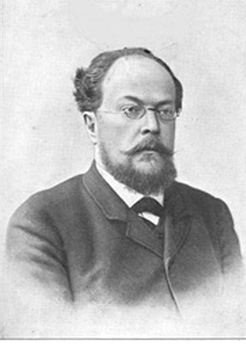
N.D. Sergeevsky

Nikolai Dmitrievich Sergeevsky (Russian: Никола́й Дми́триевич Сергеевский; 1849, Bolchino, Pskov Governorate – 1908) was a law professor and statesman from the Russian Empire.

== Biography ==
Graduate in law of St. Petersburg University; professor of Demidov Lyceum in Yaroslavl, and of criminal law in St. Petersburg University (1882), lecturer in the Military Law Academy.

Publisher and editor of Iuridicheskaia Letopis, 1890–1892; Head of the Section for the Codification of the Fundamental Laws of Finland (1893). Member of the Consultative Board in the Ministry of Justice and editor of Zhurnal Ministerstva Iustitsii (1894).

State Secretary of the Section for Codification of Laws of the Imperial Chancellery (1895).

== Works ==
- Sergeevskii, N. D. Finland : the question of autonomy and fundamental laws (1911)
