= Nikolai Kishkin =

- Николай Кишкин
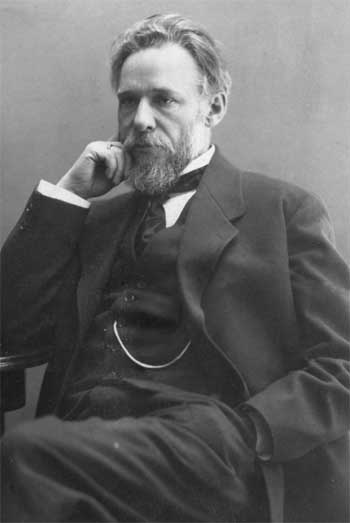
- Kishkin in 1914

Minister of State Charities
- In office 8 October – 8 November 1917
- Prime Minister: Alexander Kerensky
- Preceded by: Ivan Yefremov
- Succeeded by: Alexandra Kollontai (as people's commissar)

Personal details
- Born: 11 December [O.S. 29 November] 1864 Moscow, Russian Empire
- Died: 16 March 1930 (aged 65) Moscow, RSFSR, Soviet Union
- Party: Constitutional Democrat
- Education: Imperial Moscow University

Nikolai Mikhaylovich Kishkin (Russian: Николай Михайлович Кишкин; 11 December 1864 – 16 March 1930) was a physician and a Russian politician on the Central Committee of the Constitutional Democrat Party (Kadets). During World War I, he was Deputy Chief Representative of the All Russia Union of Cities. Following the February Revolution of 1917 he became a commissar of the Provisional Government in Moscow, being appointed Minister of Public Charities in the Kerensky government on 25 September (N.S.: 8 October) that year.

On 25 October, whilst the Bolshevik seizure of power was in progress he was appointed dictator by the cabinet meeting of the Provisional Government. Assuming this role at 4:00 pm, he immediately set about appointing assistants and replacing General Polkovnikov as commander of the Petrograd Military District, with General Jaques Bagratuni. The principal consequence of this was that a number of Polkovnikov colleagues immediately resigned or quietly watched events unfold from their windows.
