= Alexander Military Law Academy =

Coordinates: 59.9357°N 30.3054°E

Alexander Military Law Academy (Russian: Александровская военно-юридическая академия) (1867–1917) was an educational institution in Russian Empire that provided military law education for officers of Russian Army and Fleet. It was established in 1867 and named after his founder, Emperor Alexander II of Russia in 1908. The academy was situated in St. Petersburg by 96 Moika Embankment, along with many other institutions of military education.

Since 1878 it was reformed into a 3-year higher educational institution, with admittance to any of the three classes, depending on prior education of the admitted. Since 1880 officers from Serbian and Bulgarian Armies were admitted. About 1,000 officers graduated from the academy, as well as a small number or civil officials (which were admitted until 1882).

== Academy History ==
In 1866, by Auditor School, the two-year officers’ courses were established. In 1867, the courses were transformed into a Military Law Academy.

Since 1908, it received the name of Alexander in honour of Alexander the IIIrd. Officers of all types of military service in the rank up to the captain, who served in the ranks for at least 4 years, were admitted to the academy. Graduates received the right to occupy positions in the military judicial department. Since 1880, Serbian and Bulgarian officers also have studied at the academy. Totally, about 1,000 military lawyers graduated from Academy. It was closed in December 1917 after the unsuccessful Junker mutiny. It was located in Saint Petersburg on the Moika embankment, 96.
