= Vikzhel negotiations =

Failed negotiations among Russian socialist parties

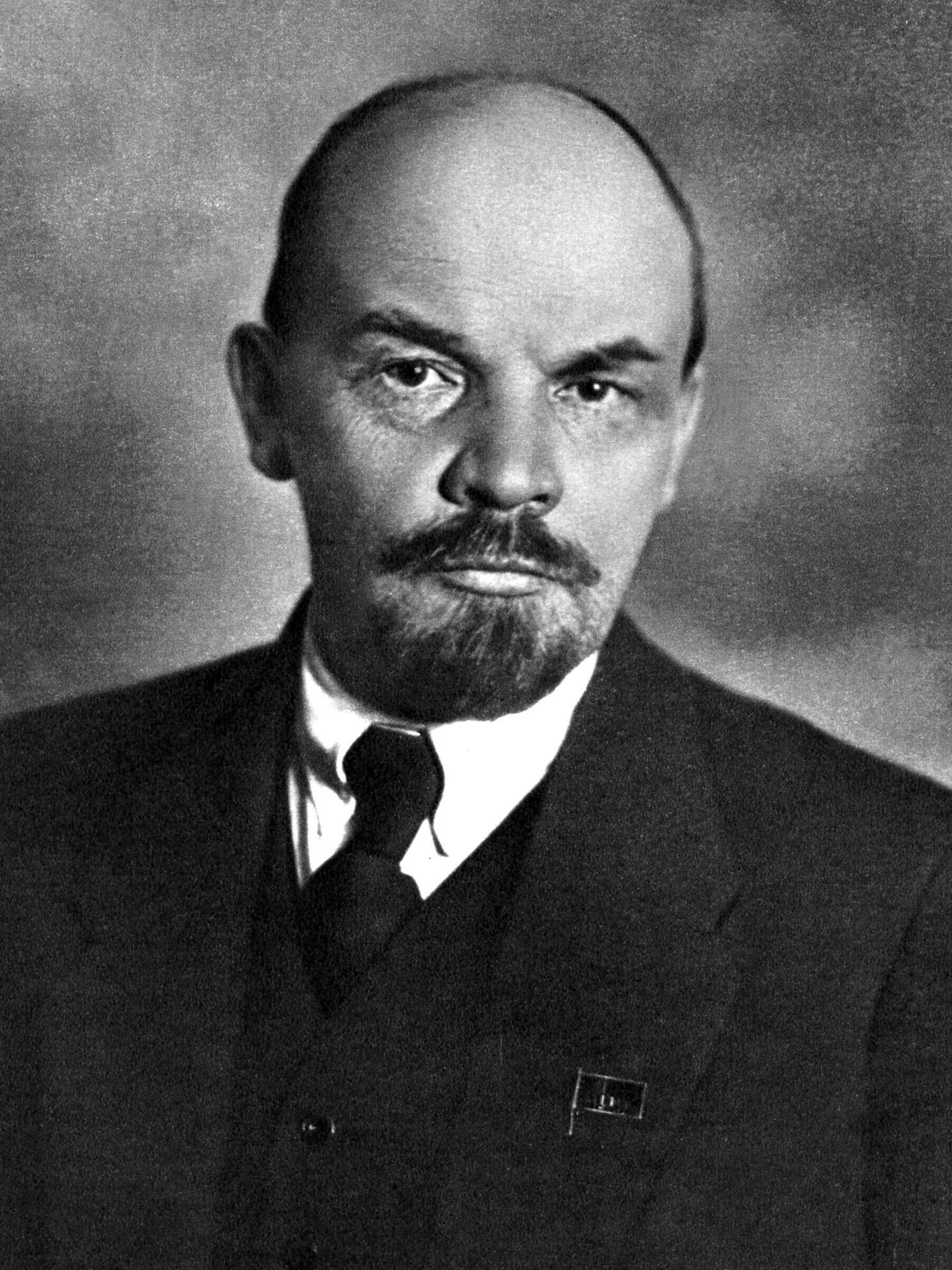
Vladimir Lenin, founder of the Soviet Union and leader of the Bolshevik party.

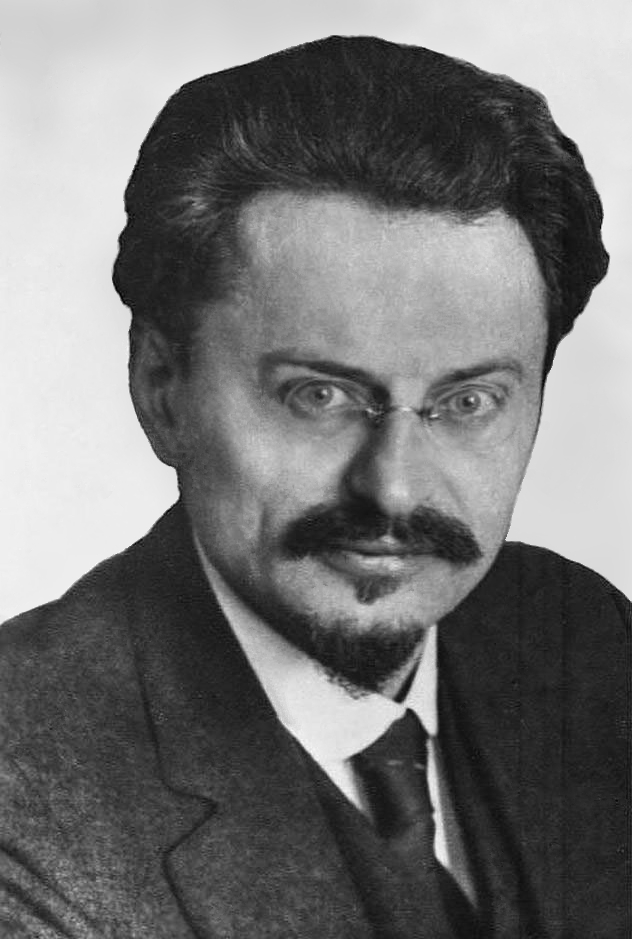
Leon Trotsky, founder of the Red Army and key figure in the October Revolution.

The Vikzhel negotiations were ultimately unsuccessful talks among Russian socialist parties, imposed by the All-Russian Executive Committee of the Railway Union (Vikzhel) with the aim of replacing the Sovnarkom, an exclusively Bolshevik government newly formed during the October Revolution, with a coalition of socialist forces.

Following the Bolshevik seizure of power during the October Revolution, their socialist political opponents resorted to arms. Vikzhel, which favored the formation of a coalition government of various socialist parties, forced them to begin negotiations for its creation. Vikzhel threatened to paralyze rail transport, which was essential for supplying cities and transporting the troops of both the Sovnarkom and its adversaries.

The attitude of the various parties varied according to the fortunes of the ongoing fighting, which Vikzhel had failed to stop. The more conservative currents of the Socialist Revolutionary Party (PSR) and the Mensheviks were initially intransigent and in favor of undoing the consequences of the October Revolution at the negotiating table, a possibility favored by the strength of the Bolshevik faction willing to compromise and the government's adverse military situation. Petrograd was threatened by the forces assembled by Kerensky and Moscow was still in dispute.

On the other hand, factions of all three parties —the PSR, the Left Socialist Revolutionaries (Left SRs) and the Mensheviks— vehemently advocated for the formation of a coalition. After several sessions, the parties reached a preliminary agreement which, however, was ultimately rejected by the majority of the Bolshevik Central Committee, once again under the control of the Leninist faction opposed to concessions to the moderate currents of the other formations. The Bolshevik victory in Moscow, the crushing of the Junker mutiny in the capital, and the failure of Kerensky's offensive against Petrograd hardened the Bolshevik position while moderating the demands of their socialist adversaries.

Lenin, with fundamental support from Trotsky and the increasing backing of the Bolshevik Central Committee, demanded a series of conditions unacceptable to the other side for the continuation of the talks. The other side responded with its own conditions, which were in turn rejected by the Sovnarkom. The efforts of moderate Bolsheviks to reach an intermediate agreement, which would not include all the conditions approved by their Central Committee, led Lenin to try to impose party discipline on them and to challenge them to take control. In response, the moderates resigned from their government and Central Committee posts, which did not serve to moderate Lenin's position. After several days, the Leninist faction's rejection of the opposition's conditions and the majority of the opposition's reluctance to accept those of the Bolsheviks led to the failure of the negotiations. Weeks later, however, the Left Socialist Revolutionaries, now split from the PSR, entered the government.

== Background ==
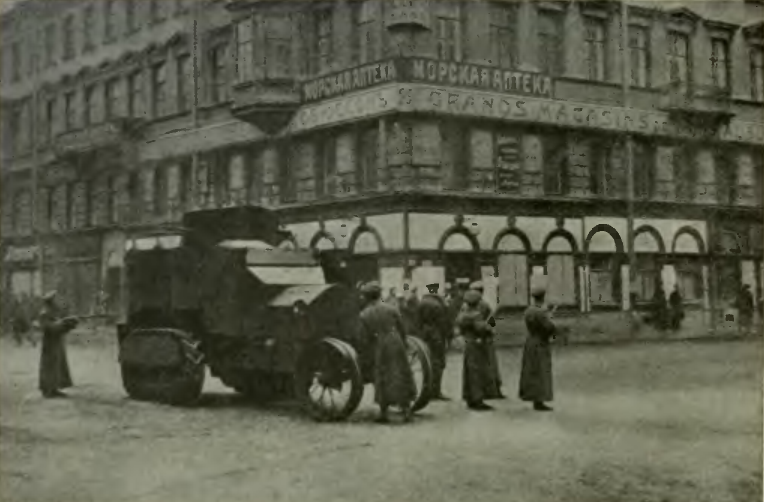
Troops favorable to the Bolsheviks during the October Revolution. Despite its rejection by the bulk of the Mensheviks and Socialist Revolutionaries, significant sectors of all three socialist parties still hoped for the formation of a coalition socialist government.

Faced with the Bolshevik seizure of power during the October Revolution —not in their own name, but in the name of the soviets— part of their socialist political adversaries decided to oppose them by armed force. Not even the Left Socialist Revolutionary wing, which had remained at the Second All-Russian Congress of Soviets after the walkout of the other parties, was willing to join the government without an agreement between those socialists who supported the October Revolution and those who rejected it. Supporters of an agreement among socialists —Menshevik-Internationalists, Left Socialist Revolutionaries, and the moderate Bolshevik current led by Kamenev and Zinoviev— began working to achieve the pact. The possibility of forming a coalition socialist government also had considerable popular support, reflected in the backing for its creation by the Petrograd Trade Union Council or the Vyborg Soviet.

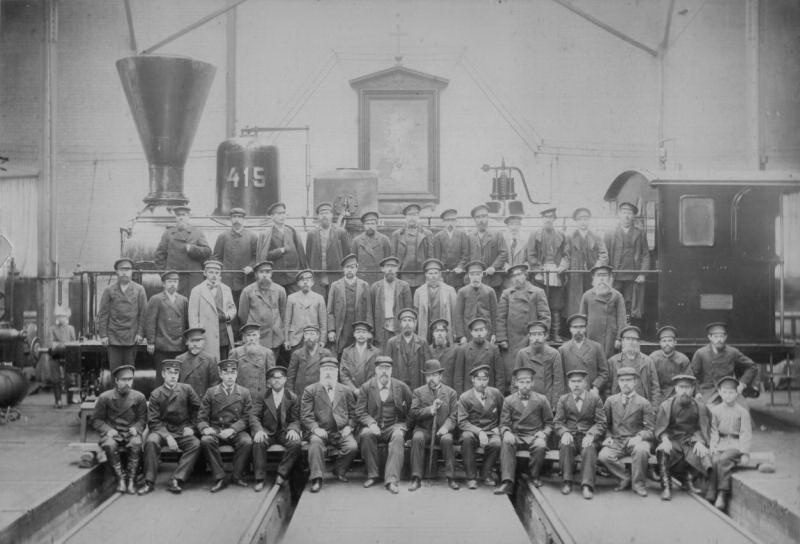
Russian railway workers. Their union's executive committee, Vikzhel, forced supporters and opponents of the October Revolution to negotiate forming a coalition socialist government by threatening to paralyze rail traffic in the country, essential for supplying cities and for military maneuvers between the two sides.

The majority of the Socialist Revolutionaries (PSR) refused to restore the overthrown Russian Provisional Government and its policy of coalition with the bourgeoisie, given its unpopularity. In Petrograd, Stankevich was alone in defending the previous cabinet, while in Moscow, the railway workers imposed on the party the acceptance of a new exclusively socialist government. Even so, the Central Committee continued to advocate for the removal of the Bolsheviks from power and the provisional return of Kerensky to hand power to a new socialist coalition cabinet that excluded Lenin's party. The party, despite lacking any real force, demanded the removal of the Bolsheviks.

The national railway workers' union decided not to side with any faction, but to mediate between the government's Military Revolutionary Committee (MRC) and the oppositionist Committee for the Salvation of the Motherland and Revolution, to try to force the warring parties to end the conflict and form a socialist coalition government. The union's power resided in its ability to paralyze communications through strikes; given that the meager supply of cities and troop movement depended on the railway network, the union's strike threat was serious. The executive committee essentially followed the policy of the Left Socialist Revolutionaries, the largest group on the committee, holding about a quarter of its approximately forty members. They wanted to remove the bourgeoisie from the government, end the war, and form a cabinet of all socialist forces in which none dominated the others.

On November 8 [O.S. October 26], Vikzhel moved from Moscow, where it was headquartered, to Petrograd and, after meeting with delegates from the Congress of Soviets, representatives of the Ministry of Transport, and moderate Bolshevik leaders, imposed a blockade on troop transport and proclaimed the calling of a strike for midnight on November 11 [O.S. October 29] if the Bolsheviks did not agree to negotiate. In the last session of the Second Congress held that same day, its representative had expressed opposition to the seizure of power by a single party, the Bolsheviks, and had called for the formation of a coalition of all socialist parties. To impose its will, Vikzhel had taken control of the railways. Any attempt to attack the railway workers would result in the end of supplies to the capital, Vikzhel's representative had indicated.

Three days later, clashes between supporters and opponents of the new government began in Moscow, initially unfavorable to the former. Fighting on the outskirts of Petrograd had also not ceased. The situation of the new government was precarious, not yet controlling Moscow and besieged in Petrograd, where on November 11 [O.S. October 29] the Junker mutiny occurred and which was being approached by the troops assembled by Kerensky.

On November 9 [O.S. October 27], both the government and the Committee for the Salvation of the Motherland and Revolution —controlled by the Socialist Revolutionaries and Mensheviks and opposed to the Bolshevik government— tried in vain to win Vikzhel's favor. The following day, despite the Menshevik Central Committee's refusal to deal with the Bolsheviks, its call to form a new government, and its demand for the surrender of the Military Revolutionary Committee, the Committee for Salvation agreed to form a new socialist government that would exclude the Bolsheviks. Riazanov, on behalf of the Bolsheviks, invited the railway workers to come to Smolny to begin negotiations. The parties thus accepted the union's demand to negotiate, but Vikzhel failed to also secure a ceasefire proclamation. Meanwhile, tensions increased between the Military Revolutionary Committee, defending the city against Kerensky, and Vikzhel, which was blocking troop movements.

== Beginning of the negotiations ==
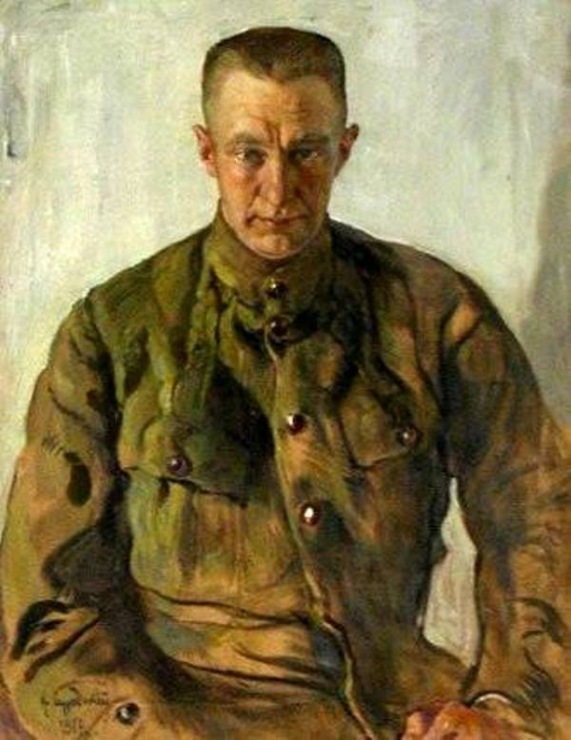
Kerensky, president of the deposed Provisional Government, tried in vain to retake Petrograd and refused to deal with the Bolsheviks while military operations favored him.

The talks began on the night of November 11 [O.S. October 29] at the headquarters of the Ministry of Transport, following the start of heavy fighting in Moscow and Kerensky's advance to Gatchina. Twenty-six delegates from the various socialist parties attended the session. The basis of the negotiations was Vikzhel's proposal to form a new socialist government encompassing everyone from the Bolsheviks to the Popular Socialists. The simultaneous ceasefire proposal was rejected by the more conservative socialists —who continued to demand the exclusion of the Bolsheviks from any future government— and by Kerensky.

The moderate Bolshevik current, led by Lev Kamenev, had secured the support of the party's Central Committee —from which Lenin, Trotsky, and Zinoviev were absent— to participate, with the intention of including in the government the parties that had left the sessions of the Second Congress of Soviets. Lenin and Trotsky were meeting with the Military Revolutionary Committee to coordinate the crushing of the Junker uprising and the defense of the capital against Kerensky. The Central Committee's motion had included the need to accept the resolutions of the Congress of Soviets, the responsibility of the new cabinet to the soviets, and the inclusion in it of all socialist parties as bases for negotiating with the adversaries. Kamenev wanted to secure the support of the moderate socialists and deny it to Kerensky. To this end, he was willing to retain in their posts on the All-Russian Central Executive Committee (Note: CEC or VTsIK in its Russian acronym, was the highest state body since the Second Congress of Soviets, roughly equivalent to a parliament.) the delegates who had withdrawn during the Congress. The course of the fighting, unfavorable to the Bolsheviks both in Moscow and on the outskirts of Petrograd between November 11 [O.S. October 29] and November 13 [O.S. October 31], favored the Bolshevik conciliatory attitude. At the plenary session of the All-Russian Central Executive Committee (CEC or VTsIK) on the same day, November 11 [O.S. October 29], Kamenev expressed his willingness to accept the exclusion of Lenin and Trotsky demanded by the other moderate socialist parties and to contemplate a government in which his party did not hold a majority.

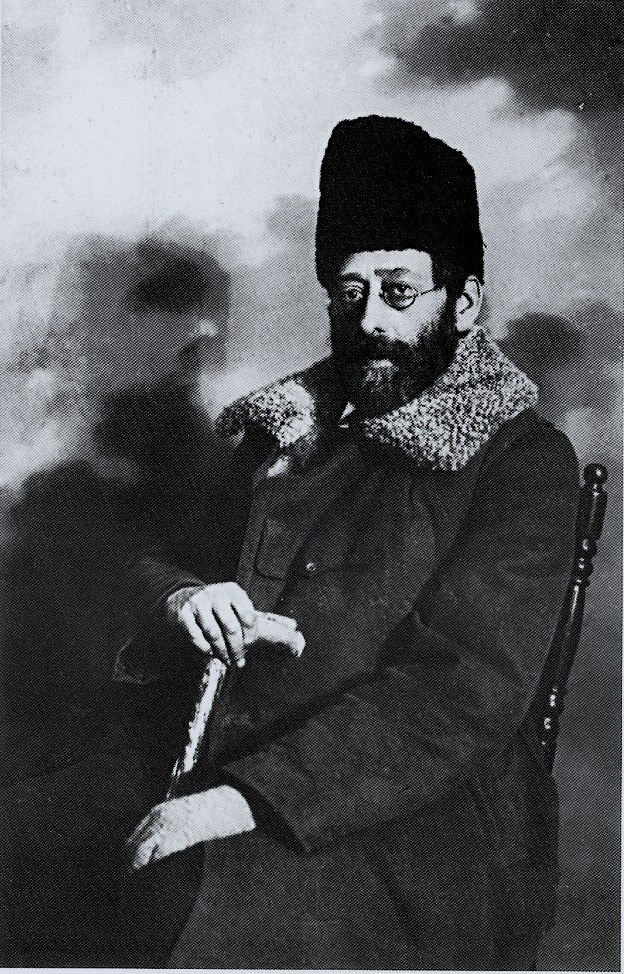
Martov, Menshevik leader, began to regain control of the party but did not achieve decisive support from his party for the negotiations and had to contend with a significant defensist faction, totally opposed to an agreement with the Bolsheviks.

The very weakness of the Sovnarkom that facilitated Bolshevik moderation hardened the stance of the socialist parties that had supported the Provisional Government overthrown in the October Revolution.

Gendelman, spokesman for the Socialist Revolutionaries, expressed willingness to end Kerensky's government and create a new exclusively socialist Council of Ministers, but without the Bolsheviks and only after their military defeat, and encouraged the railway workers to support Kerensky's military operations. Despite Gendelman's bellicose tone, the uprising in Petrograd encouraged by his party had failed that same day.

Martov wanted to channel the October Revolution and prevent a clash among socialists from facilitating counterrevolution. His desire to end the clashes among socialists peacefully was shared by other delegates in the talks. Eager to prevent their failure, he was initially singularly conciliatory towards the Bolsheviks in the first session. During the talks, he expressed opposition to the Sovnarkom's repressive measures, such as the closure of socialist publications, executions without trial, and other excesses of the Military Revolutionary Committee. In his opinion, the lack of agreement among socialists would lead to imminent civil war. Dan, also representing the Mensheviks, indicated that his party would only participate in the new cabinet if the Socialist Revolutionaries also joined. With a preliminary agreement between the parties, an inter-party committee was formed that began to finalize the agreement during the night.

The morning session of November 12 [O.S. October 30] was short: delegates heard a report on the negotiations with Kerensky and scheduled another meeting for the night. In the evening session, Martov demanded the abolition of the Military Revolutionary Committee's decree calling for the arrest and trial before a revolutionary tribunal of members of the Committee for Salvation, a demand accepted by Vikzhel. That morning, at a joint conference of Mensheviks and Socialist Revolutionaries, the two parties had agreed on a series of demands to present that night at the second round of negotiations: disarmament of the Red Guards, handing over control of the capital's garrison to the city council, and proclaiming an armistice. In return, they committed to ensuring that Kerensky's troops would not fight in the capital and that a new socialist government, excluding the Bolsheviks, would be formed. Vikzhel had forced the reluctant Socialist Revolutionaries to negotiate. In the evening session, the new Socialist Revolutionary representative, Rakitnikov, more left-leaning than Gendelman, admitted the participation of Bolshevik ministers in the new government, not as party representatives but in a personal capacity, but vetoed the inclusion of Lenin or Trotsky. The new government was also to be responsible to the Pre-parliament, which would be restored. The right wing of the PSR, like the Menshevik defensists, in any case, continued to refuse to govern alongside the Bolsheviks.

On November 13 [O.S. October 31], positions moved closer to Vikzhel's proposals —whose representatives were Left Socialist Revolutionaries—: the Bolsheviks became more conciliatory and stopped demanding 51% of the cabinet portfolios, the Right Socialist Revolutionaries offered to join a government without Lenin and Trotsky, and the Right Mensheviks expressed willingness to support the new government —even if it included Bolsheviks— although not to participate in it. The PSR also accepted the demise of the Provisional Government and abandoned its demand to revive the Pre-parliament. They demanded, however, the granting of seats to the peasant soviets and the dumas (city councils) in the new legislative body, which would have left the Bolsheviks in a minority. Kerensky's setbacks moderated the positions of the Mensheviks and Socialist Revolutionaries but, at the same time, hardened those of the Bolsheviks.

The majority of delegates approved the creation of the new body proposed by the Mensheviks and Socialist Revolutionaries. Despite the preliminary agreement, the parties also had to resolve important practical questions: whether the new government would be responsible to the CEC (or VTsIK) or to another body, the number of commissariats to be allocated to each party, and who would form the cabinet.

Although Martov and Dan managed to get the Menshevik Central Committee to endorse the negotiations and the formation of a new socialist coalition cabinet, the defensist faction generally continued to oppose any agreement with the Bolsheviks, demanding from them the restoration of abolished freedoms and the immediate convocation of the Constituent Assembly. Their position on what government should replace the Sovnarkom, however, was unclear: while some advocated the return of Kerensky, others preferred a new coalition not led by him, and others were even willing to reach an agreement with the Bolsheviks if they excluded Lenin and Trotsky from the future government.

== Apparent agreement ==
An inter-party commission resolved most disagreements in the session of November 13 [O.S. October 31]: the formation of a new legislative body, the "People's Council", was approved, in which not only the new CEC elected at the Second Congress would participate, but also the previous one, the dumas (city councils), the main trade unions, and the provincial soviets. This body was to be responsible for electing the new government, which was, however, already decided during the talks. In practice, this was almost a resurrection of the Pre-parliament dissolved during the October Revolution. The president of the new cabinet would be the Socialist Revolutionary Viktor Chernov and it would not include Lenin or Trotsky. The pact, reached after hours of heated debate, which reserved important ministries —Education, Industry and Trade, and possibly Labor, Interior, and Foreign Affairs— for the Bolsheviks and was achieved mainly through the agreement of the moderate Bolsheviks, the Left Socialist Revolutionaries, and the Menshevik-Internationalists, seemed final.

Kamenev committed to publishing it; Izvestia published an inaccurate version, omitting the list of ministers or the participation of the dumas in the new legislative body. Rabochi i soldat indicated that an agreement had been reached among the parties represented in the soviets.

== Failure ==
=== Bolshevik disagreements ===
Bolshevik currents

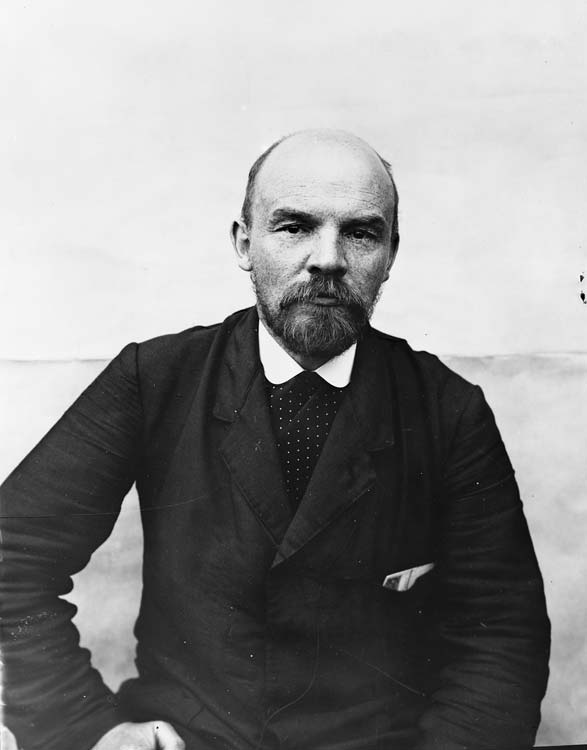
Lenin, the main Bolshevik leader, opposed an agreement with conservative socialist sectors and yielding the power obtained during the October Revolution, which he considered the germ of the imminent world revolution.

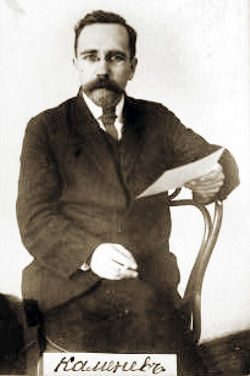
Lev Kamenev, opposed to the seizure of power in the October Revolution and to Lenin's assessment of the situation, advocated in vain for an agreement with the other socialist parties.

On November 14 [O.S. November 1], news arrived of the Bolshevik victory in Moscow and the withdrawal of Kerensky's forces from the outskirts of Petrograd, which eased military pressure on the government and, in the following days, led to a divergence of positions at the negotiating table. With military victory, the Bolsheviks' interest in negotiating with their adversaries —non-existent in Lenin's case— notably diminished. For their part, the Socialist Revolutionaries were also not participating with the intention of reaching an agreement. Both parties attended the negotiations compelled by the railway workers. The return of Lenin and Trotsky to the Central Committee sessions also favored the hardening of the Bolshevik negotiating position.

Lenin and Trotsky —the latter just returned from the fighting south of the capital against Kerensky— convinced that Kamenev had made excessive concessions, attacked the agreement in the lengthy Central Committee meeting on the afternoon and night of November 14 [O.S. November 1]. Lenin argued that including the dumas would be a concession to bourgeois forces and would end the assumption of power by the soviets approved at the Second Congress; he advocated an exclusively Bolshevik government. Convinced that the revolution in Russia would soon spread throughout the rest of Europe, he maintained that concessions to the moderate socialists would return governmental power to them and frustrate the world revolution. In a heated session, he advocated arresting Vikzhel if it resisted the government and challenged the conciliationist current of Kamenev to force a split in the party and take power if it obtained a majority —while threatening to seek the support of the sailors in that case—. Lunacharsky, in defense of the agreement, opposed excluding the dumas, elected by universal suffrage and which he considered necessary to guarantee state administration, as well as using force or terror to remain in power. He received support from Viktor Nogin, who criticized the absence of Mensheviks and Socialist Revolutionaries from the soviets, as this rendered them useless, and from David Riazanov, who feared that rejecting the pact would deprive them of the support of the Left Socialist Revolutionaries and invalidate the promise of a Soviet government. Trotsky, for his part, sided with Lenin and harshly attacked the moderates.

Although the moderates were willing to continue negotiations and try to modify the agreement reached, Lenin indicated that the talks should only continue as a stratagem to facilitate military operations against Kerensky, since he was convinced that the other socialist parties would not accept the soviets as the basis of national government. Trotsky, meanwhile, indicated that an agreement with the Mensheviks would only serve to complicate the Bolsheviks' governmental activities. Yakov Sverdlov suggested using an incident to end the negotiations. The final vote concluded with ten votes in favor of continuing dialogue with the socialist adversaries and four opposed. Despite this, the committee approved certain conditions, proposed by Lenin: acceptance of Soviet political power and of the Second Congress and its decrees, the government's responsibility to the CEC, the exclusion from the CEC of organizations that were not soviets, the inclusion of himself and Trotsky in the cabinet, and the fight against counterrevolutionary forces, including Kerensky. These minimum conditions were intended to demonstrate the impossibility —pointed out by Trotsky— of reaching an agreement with the moderates without at the same time destroying the possibility of an alliance with the Left Socialist Revolutionaries.

The Bolshevik position approved at the Central Committee meeting was presented shortly after that same night by V. Volodarsky, closer to Lenin's theses, to the CEC, to the disappointment of supporters of the agreement from other parties, who believed in the prospects of an immediate pact. The Bolshevik majority in the CEC ensured the approval of the motion proposed by Volodarsky, finally passed also with the votes of the Left Socialist Revolutionaries, who first tried in vain to present a more conciliatory alternative motion.

=== The withdrawal of the Socialist Revolutionaries ===
Faced with the reiteration of the Bolshevik demand that power reside solely in the soviets, the Socialist Revolutionary delegates withdrew from the talks, thereafter attending only as observers. In reality, the PSR had participated reluctantly in the negotiations, compelled by the railway workers; Kerensky had been receptive to Vikzhel's proposals only after the defeat at the Pulkovo Heights. Intransigent in the sessions, they had scarcely agreed to grant the Bolsheviks a part of the political power that they already fully enjoyed.

=== Menshevik disagreements ===
While Kamenev faced the need to try to convince his co-religionists to accept the dumas in the new parliament or for the Socialist Revolutionaries and Mensheviks to accept the conditions added by Lenin and approved by the Bolshevik Central Committee, the Menshevik supporters of the agreement simultaneously faced their own rivals within the party. The previous day, they had barely managed to pass a resolution to continue negotiating with the Bolsheviks by twelve votes to eleven. On the night of November 14 [O.S. November 1], the result was repeated, and the defensists decided to resign from the Central Committee, which would have unleashed a serious crisis between the party's two currents. To avoid this, the narrow internationalist majority decided to make concessions to the defensists. The Menshevik Central Committee responded the following day to the Bolshevik conditions with its own. These included the rejection of excluding the dumas and other democratic organizations from the new parliament —a concession to the defensists to try to secure their support—, the release of political prisoners arrested in the preceding days, an end to political terror and the restoration of political rights such as the right to strike, assembly, association, and freedom of the press, a ceasefire in the conflict with Krasnov and Kerensky, and the transfer of some troops to the dumas to prevent pogroms and looting.

=== New agreement, Bolshevik and Menshevik crisis ===
Lenin rejected these conditions and managed to pass, by a one-vote majority, a new resolution more intransigent than the previous one on November 15 [O.S. November 2]. The motion, vainly rejected by the moderates on the Central Committee, demanded his presence and Trotsky's in the government, and indicated that only the Sovnarkom's measures were compatible with the expansion of the Russian revolution throughout Europe. By demanding conditions unacceptable to the Mensheviks and Socialist Revolutionaries, he sought to derail the negotiations, without openly rejecting the original agreement. Kamenev, with dwindling support in the Bolshevik Central Committee, tried to unblock the negotiations by publicly presenting Lenin's second motion before the CEC; after protesting and allowing a recess, the opposition approved Kamenev's motion presented on behalf of the Bolshevik delegation. This included the admission of the dumas, trade unions, and representatives of the Congress of Peasants' Soviets and the army into the new parliament, the reservation of at least half the seats for the Bolsheviks, the inclusion of Lenin and Trotsky in the new government, and the cession of the Ministries of Interior, Labor, and Foreign Affairs to their party. In the early hours of November 16 [O.S. November 3], the opposition had accepted Kamenev's motion upon learning of Lenin's much greater demands.

The agreement in the VTsIK was a serious setback for Lenin's position, as the approved motion included the main Bolshevik demands in exchange for granting fifty seats to the dumas. The moderates hoped it would gain majority support from the Bolshevik and Menshevik Central Committees and the party rank and file. Lenin, furious, considering that the actions of a minority against an approved motion violated party discipline, reacted by interviewing all members of the Central Committee separately and proposing their signing of an ultimatum addressed to the moderates. Lenin demanded support for his positions expressed in the motion and the resignation of the opposition or their taking the reins of government and his own exclusion. Nine members signed Lenin's proposal. Finally, Lenin offered to convene an extraordinary congress to decide the party's position, a challenge the moderates did not accept.

For their part, the situation was similar in the Menshevik party: the defensists demanded a party conference after the defeat of their positions in the Central Committee. The two party currents clashed fiercely and tried to gain a majority at the extraordinary conference on November 16 [O.S. November 3]. They engaged in a bitter debate in which each presented itself as the true representative of Menshevism. With forces evenly matched, the final resolution did not clearly adopt the theses of either the supporters or opponents of an agreement; it timidly criticized the Central Committee's actions and vaguely recommended a change of attitude, without specifying which one should be adopted.

However, the proposal of the moderate Bolsheviks approved by the CEC proved unacceptable to the opposition, which expressed its rejection in the session of November 16 [O.S. November 3] before launching into criticism of Bolshevik repression and again demanding the formation of a new cabinet responsible to the "Provisional People's Council".

Given the continuation of political repression by the Military Revolutionary Committee, Martov and Dan proved unable to garner sufficient support from the Mensheviks and Socialist Revolutionaries to sustain the agreement. Thus, they demanded an end to the repression on November 17 [O.S. November 4] as a condition for continuing dialogue. The Mensheviks demanded an end to terror, the release of the bourgeois ministers from the Peter and Paul Fortress, and an end to hostilities —which Kerensky had already accepted—. This maneuver was intended to strengthen their position in the Central Committee and dispel doubts that they were yielding to Lenin. Kamenev reacted by demanding that the Military Revolutionary Committee cease its repression to allow negotiations to continue, in accordance with the motion approved by the Central Committee days earlier. The moderate faction opposed the terror, criticized its use by the Sovnarkom, and warned that it could lead to the failure of the revolution and the formation of a government not responsible to the people:

We stand for the formation of a socialist government that includes all socialist parties. We understand that there is only one alternative: the preservation of an exclusively Bolshevik government through political terror. This is the path chosen by the Council of People's Commissars. We cannot and do not wish to follow this path. We believe it will lead to the isolation of the masses from the direction of the country's political life and to the formation of an irresponsible government. It will lead to the destruction of the revolution and the country. We cannot take responsibility for these measures and therefore we resign from the Council of People's Commissars and so declare to the CEC.

— Nogin, Rykov, Milyutin, Teodorovich, Riazanov, Derbyshev, Arbuzov, Yurenev, Fyodorov, Larin, Shlyapnikov.
November 5 [O.S. October 23] 1917

Five members of the Central Committee —Kamenev, Zinoviev, Rykov, Nogin, and Milyutin— and four People's Commissars —Rykov, Nogin, Teodorovich, and Milyutin— resigned. Kamenev left the presidency of the VTsIK, which passed to Sverdlov. The resignations, accompanied by letters from Kamenev, Zinoviev, Rykov, Nogin, and Milyutin to various Bolshevik organizations, sought to involve the party rank and file in the position on the negotiations. The Left Socialist Revolutionaries, in protest against the measures of the Military Revolutionary Committee, resigned from it between November 17 [O.S. November 4] and November 18 [O.S. November 5].

Lenin's rejection of the Menshevik ultimatum, however, sufficed to end them. On November 18 [O.S. November 5], Vikzhel informed its members in Moscow of the failure of the negotiations and its return to the capital. At the session that night, the Bolsheviks and Left Socialist Revolutionaries did not appear, and the Mensheviks and Socialist Revolutionaries, convinced of the imminent disintegration of the Bolshevik party due to the resignations of the moderates and increasingly opposed to an agreement with them due to the repression of the Military Revolutionary Committee, appeared with no intention of reaching a deal. The last session took place on November 20 [O.S. November 7], and the Bolshevik representatives no longer attended. At that moment, they were approving in the CEC the permission for the Sovnarkom to govern by decree. The Leninist position had been gaining strength during the last few days among the capital's proletariat. Both the meeting of the Bolshevik Petersburg Committee and the delegates of the First Conference of Petrograd Workers or the Petrograd Trade Union Council —the latter two initially favorable to the positions of the moderate Bolsheviks— expressed their support for Lenin's position during the final days of the negotiations. Moreover, Vikzhel's strength was less than it appeared: the executive committee could not impose its criteria on all railway workers, and Bolshevik supporters abounded, especially among workshop workers and in Moscow.

== Conclusions ==
The Bolshevik division was joined by that of the Mensheviks, unable to maintain a coherent position given the great differences between their two main internal currents. The narrow internationalist majority of Martov and Dan could not accept the Bolshevik conditions, nor even those of the moderates, without suffering a split from the defensists.

For their part, the Socialist Revolutionaries also had no intention of reaching an agreement with Lenin's government and tried to use their participation merely to gain time and allow Kerensky to retake the capital thanks to troops from the front. Their most left-wing current, which soon after split from the party, failed to overcome the rejection by Lenin and Trotsky of sharing power with the moderate socialists, but eventually joined the government weeks later nonetheless. While the centrist Socialist Revolutionaries might have been able to reach an agreement with the moderate Bolsheviks, those opposed to the agreement in both formations made the pact impossible. The insistence of the Bolsheviks that the opposition accept a government based on the soviets, and the refusal of the Socialist Revolutionaries, who considered these bodies a class organization inferior to those elected by universal suffrage like the city councils, made an agreement impossible. For the PSR, the limit of its concessions would have been the formation of a temporary coalition government, subject to the authority of a body in which there would be parity of soviets and dumas and which would have ceded power to the Constituent Assembly. They flatly rejected the dictatorship of the proletariat and the Bolshevik demand for supremacy in the government.

Thus, in the three main parties participating in the negotiations, the opponents of the pact prevailed. This, together with the inability of the opposition to muster notable military support and the outcome of the fighting, allowed Lenin to remain in power at the head of an exclusively Bolshevik government —until the entry of the Left Socialist Revolutionaries in December— while approving a large number of measures without the participation of the theoretical legislative body, the CEC. The coalition between Bolsheviks and Left Socialist Revolutionaries lasted only a few months, as the latter left the government in March 1918 due to the signing of the peace with the Central Powers; by the summer of 1918, all political parties except the Communist Party —the new name of the Bolsheviks— had been banned.

== Bibliography ==
- Brovkin, Vladimir N. (1991). The Mensheviks after October: Socialist Opposition and the Rise of the Bolshevik Dictatorship. Cornell University Press. p. 400. ISBN 9780801499760.
- Carr, Edward Hallett (1966a). The Bolshevik Revolution 1917-1923 Volume One (PDF). Penguin. p. 448.
- — (1966). The Bolshevik Revolution 1917-1923 Volume Two. Penguin. p. 448. OCLC 855917686.
- Chamberlin, William Henry (1976). The Russian revolution, 1917-1918: from the overthrow of the czar to the assumption of power by the bolsheviks. Grosset & Dunlap. pp. 511. ISBN 9780448001883.
- Daniels, Robert Vincent (1997). Red October: the Bolshevik Revolution of 1917. Beacon Press. pp. 269. ISBN 9780807056455.
- Deutscher, Isaac (1997). The Prophet Armed: Trotsky, 1879-1921. Replica Books. p. 540. ISBN 9780735100145.
- Felstinsky, Yuri (1988). The Bolsheviks and the Left SRS, October 1917-July 1918 : toward a single-party dictatorship (Thesis). Rutgers University. OCLC 42033223.
- Getzler, Israel (1967). Martov: A political biography of a Russian Social Democrat. Cambridge University Press. p. 246. ISBN 0521526027.
- Melancon, Michael (1997). "The Left Socialist Revolutionaries and the Bolshevik Uprising". In Brovkin, Vladimir N. (ed.). The Bolsheviks in Russian Society: The Revolution and the Civil Wars. Yale University Press. p. 400. ISBN 9780300146349.
- Pethybridge, Roger William (1972). The spread of the Russian revolution; Essays on 1917. St. Martin's Press. pp. 238. ISBN 9780333132449.
- Rabinowitch, Alexander (1978). The Bolsheviks Come to Power: The Revolution of 1917 in Petrograd. W. W. Norton & Company. p. 393. ISBN 9780393008937.
- — (2007). The Bolsheviks in Power: The First Year of Soviet Rule in Petrograd. Indiana University Press. p. 520. ISBN 9780253349439.
- Radkey, Oliver H. (1963). The Sickle Under the Hammer: The Russian Socialist Revolutionaries in the Early Months of Soviet Rule. Columbia University Press. pp. 525. OCLC 422729.
- Schapiro, Leonard (1965). The Origin of the Communist Autocracy: Political Opposition in the Soviet State, First Phase, 1917-1922. Cambridge: Harvard University Press. p. 371. ISBN 9780674644519. Archived from the original on 19 June 2013 – via Questia.
