= Sergey Semyonovich Khabalov =

Russian general (1858–1924)

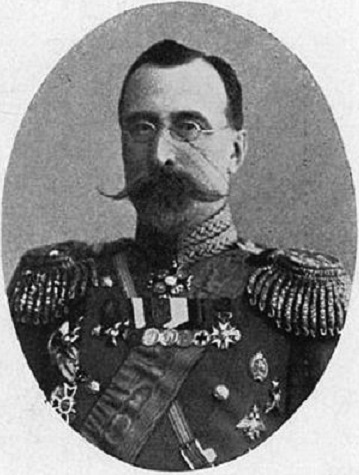
- General Sergey Khabalov
- Born: 21 April 1858; Russian Empire
- Died: 1924 (aged 65-66); Thessaloniki, Kingdom of Greece
- Military career
- Allegiance: Russian Empire
- Branch: Imperial Russian Army
- Service years: 1877–1917
- Rank: Lieutenant General
- Commands: Petrograd Military District (1916–1917)
- Conflicts: Russo-Turkish War; World War I; February Revolution
- Awards: See below

Sergey Semyonovich Khabalov (Russian: Сергей Семенович Хабалов; 3 May [O.S. 21 April] 1858 — 1924) was an Imperial Russian Army general of Ossetian origin and the commander of the Petrograd military district in 1917.

== Biography ==
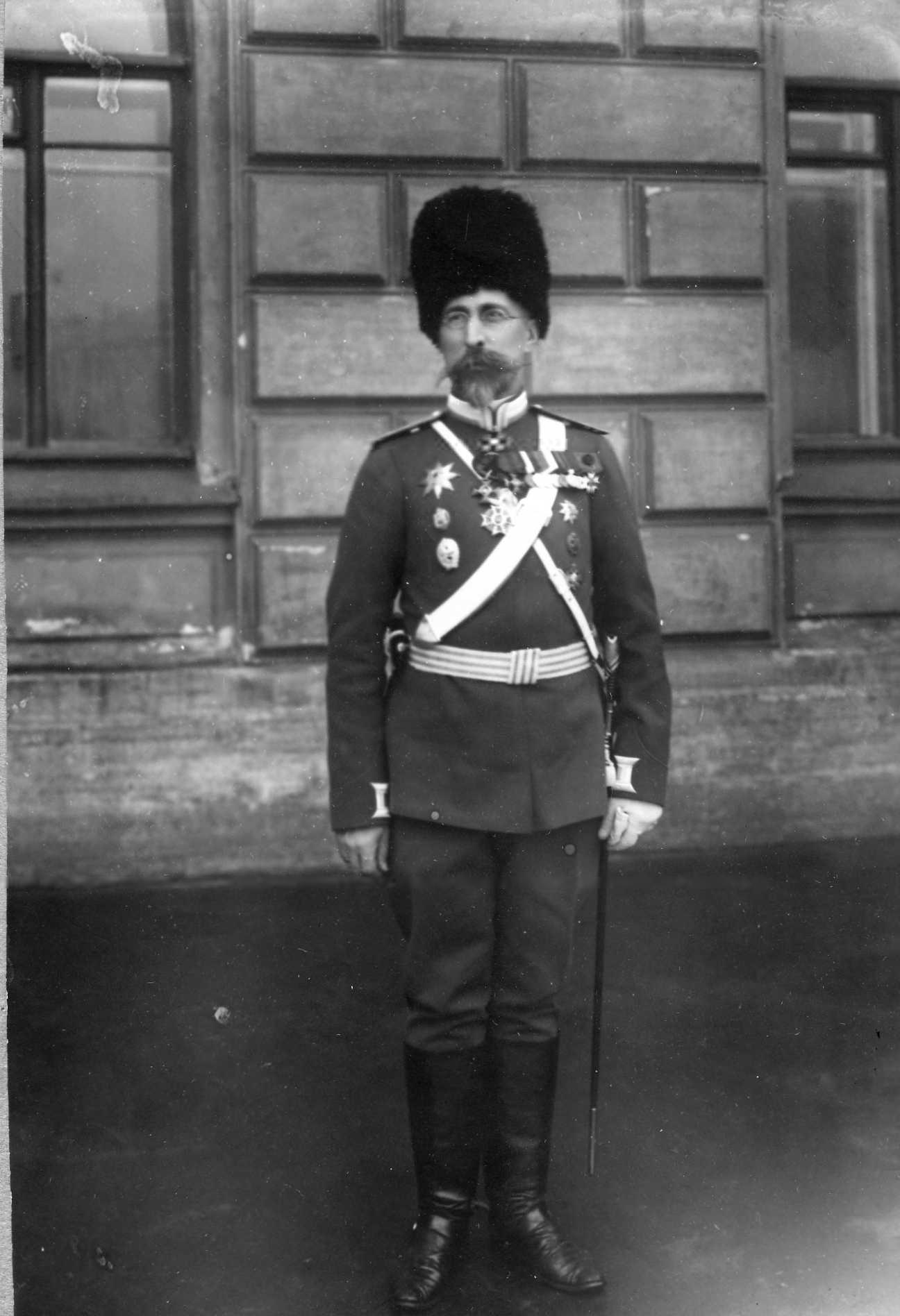
General Sergey Khabalov, c. 1914

Khabalov was born in the Russian Empire, and was of Ossetian origin. After He graduated from the Mikhailovskoye Artillery School in 1878, he participated in the Russo-Turkish War. In 1886, he graduated from the Nikolayev Academy of General Staff, after which he held several different positions. He served in the Imperial Guards from 1886–1900. From 1903 to 1914, he became the head of several military schools. From 1903 to 1905, Colonel Khabalov was the head of the Moscow Military School, from 1905 to 1914, was the head of the Pavlov Military School. In 1914, he was appointed military governor and commander of the Ural Oblast, as well as the ataman of the Ural Cossacks Host. In 1916, he was appointed chief officer of the Petrograd Military District, and commander in 1917.

=== February Revolution ===
On 13 June 1916, General Khabalov was recalled to the capital and during the February Revolution, on 24 February 1917, appointed as commander-in-chief of the Petrograd Military District, and was given full power. Most of the troops refused to obey him and Khabalov fully lost control of the army units. In The Red Wheel, March 1917, Aleksandr Solzhenitsyn considers him to be "incapable and overwhelmed". He was arrested on the 28th and imprisoned in the Peter and Paul fortress and in Summer questioned by the Extraordinary Commission of Inquiry for the Investigation of Illegal Acts by Ministers and Other Responsible Persons of the Czarist Regime.

=== Exile and death ===
In 1919 he went to the South of Russia. On 1 March 1920, he was evacuated from Novorossiysk to Thessaloniki. He died in Thessaloniki in an American hospital in 1924.

== Honours and awards ==
=== Domestic ===
- Order of St. Stanislaus, 3rd class (1883)
- Order of St. Anna, 3rd class (1887)
- Order of St. Stanislaus, 2nd class (1890)
- Order of St. Anna, 2nd class (1883)
- Order of St. Vladimir, 4th class (1895)
- Order of St. Vladimir, 3rd class (1901)
- Order of St. Stanislaus, 1st class (1906)
- Order of St. Anna, 1st class (8.11.1910)
- Order of St. Vladimir, 2nd class (1914)
- Order of the White Eagle (1916)

=== Foreign ===
- French Third Republic
  - Legion of Honour, Officer’s Cross (12.10.1897, France)
- Kingdom of Romania
  - Order of the Crown (15.2.?, Romania)
- Empire of Japan
  - Order of the Sacred Treasure, Grand Cordan Class (3.6.1914, Japan)
