= Yakov Bagratuni =

Armenian prince and general (1879–1943)

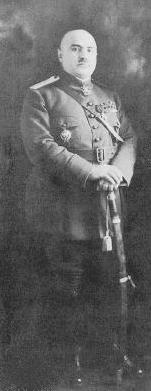
- Born: Yakov Gerasimovich Bagratuni; 25 August 1879; Akhaltsikhe, Tiflis Governorate, Russian Empire
- Died: 23 December 1943 (aged 64); Lostwithiel, United Kingdom
- Burial place: Brompton Cemetery
- Military career
- Allegiance: Russian Empire (1900–1917); Centrocaspian Dictatorship (1918); Republic of Armenia (1918–1920)
- Service years: 1900–1920
- Rank: Major general
- Commands: 1st Army Corps
- Conflicts: Russo-Japanese War; World War I; Armenian National Liberation Movement; July 26 Baku Coup d'état; Battle of Baku; Russian Civil War
- Awards: see below

Prince Yakov Gerasimovich Bagratuni (Armenian: Յակոբ Բագրատունի, Russian: Яков Герасимович Багратуни; 25 August 1879 – 23 December 1943) was a Russian and Armenian nobleman and military commander. He was a major general in the Imperial Russian Army. During World War I, he served under the Centro-Caspian Dictatorship and the First Republic of Armenia and later became the Ambassador of Armenia to Great Britain.

== Early life ==
Bagratuni was born on 25 August 1879 in Akhaltsikhe city, in Caucasus Viceroyalty (1801–1917) of the Russian Empire to a noble family. His family is descended from the Bagratuni dynasty of former kings of Armenia in the Middle Ages (885-1045). He graduated from the Tiflis gymnasium in 1898 with honors, from the Kiev Military School in 1900, and from the Nicholas General Staff Academy in 1907.

== Military career ==
Bagratuni served as an officer in Warsaw and successfully completed an important task in the intelligence of Persia. He became a Lieutenant in 1904 and that same year he entered the Academy of the General Staff, but in early 1905 his teaching was interrupted and he went to the front of the Russian-Japanese War. Bagratuni commanded a company in the 19th East Siberian Regiment. On 25 February 1905 in a battle near the village of Pooh, he was shot and wounded, but continued to command a company. For military merit he was awarded the Order of St. Anna 4th class with the inscription "For Bravery" and the Order of Saint Stanislaus 3rd class with Swords.

On 26 November 1908, he became Captain and Assistant Adjutant Main Staff of the Turkestan Military District. Bagratuni then led the 4th Intelligence Department of the district headquarters. According to his biographer, Academician Hrant Avetisyan, Bagratouni carried out secret military research and practical tasks in Mongolia, Tibet, Korea, Afghanistan, and Central Asia in Bukhara, Kashgar, Kermishe, Kushka, Merv. He uncovered a plot of Pan-Turkic emissaries in Tashkent and other cities of Turkestan. This feat was marked by his awarding the Order of St. Anna 3rd degree and he was promoted to Lieutenant colonel. Also for his services rendered, the Emir of Bukhara celebrated by granting him the Order of the Golden Star of Bukhara 3rd class.

=== First World War ===
At the beginning of the First World War, Bagratuni was a staff officer for assignments at the headquarters of the 1st Army Corps of Turkestan. In September 1914, he distinguished himself in battle in the Western Front in the area of Luka, for which he was awarded the Order of Saint Stanislaus 2nd class with Swords and Order of St. Vladimir 4th class with Swords. From October 1914 to January 1915, temporarily filled the post of Chief of Staff of the 1st Army Corps of Turkestan, and from January 1915 to November 1916 he was the Chief of Staff of the 76th Infantry Division, 2nd Turkestan Infantry Brigade, and 2nd Turkestan Infantry Artillery Brigade. Bagratuni was given the rank of Colonel on 6 December 1915, and for making the differences in the battles he awarded the Order of St. Vladimir 3rd class with Swords, Order of St. Anna 2nd class with Swords, and Order of St. George 4th class. On 22 November 1916, he became the commander of the 8th Turkestan Infantry Regiment.

=== Activities in 1917 ===
After the February Revolution, he was one of the supporters of democratic reforms in the army. He was elected a delegate to the All-Russian Congress of officers in Petrograd in May 1917 and since June 1917 he served in the office of the Minister of War of the Russian Provisional Government of Alexander Kerensky, his brother-in-law. Bagratuni became the Chief of Staff of the Petrograd Military District on 12 July 1917 and was promoted to major general on 30 August 1917.

He was one of the organizers of the creation of the Armenian military units in the Russian army. In August 1917, together with the continuation of his service in the post of Chief of Staff Military District, he was elected Armenian military commissioner and chairman of the Armenian military council, and actively engaged in the formation of the Armenian volunteer units.

On the eve of the coming to power of the Bolsheviks to take measures against troops loyal to the Provisional Government, the headquarters of the Northern Front ordered to send a special military unit to Petrograd. However, the Front Command did not carry out the order. As a result, Bagratuni managed to collect only small military force. On 7 November 1917, the newly appointed Dictator of the Provisional Government Nikolai Kishkin received authority to restore order in the city. He immediately removed the hesitant Colonel Georgy Polkovnikov from his post as commander in chief of the Petrograd Military District and replaced him with a more energetic General Jaques Bagratuni. However, he could not reverse the negative development of the situation and the Bolsheviks soon overran the district headquarters. He resigned and was arrested by the Bolsheviks in the Winter Palace. Bagratuni was imprisoned in the fortress until he was released on 15 December 1917. The next day, he again assumed the office of the Armenian military commissar.

=== Armenian general and diplomat ===
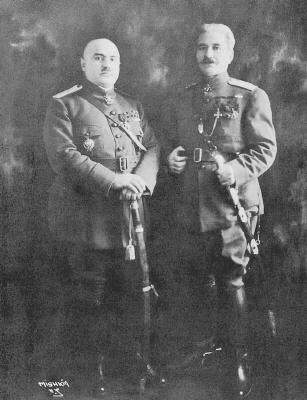
General Jaques Bagratuni and General Andranik Ozanian

Bagratuni continued to work on the formation of an army corps and sending troops to Armenia and the Caucasus from late 1917 to early 1918. He arrived in Baku on 7 March 1918 at the urging of revolutionary leader Vladimir Lenin to assist the Centrocaspian Dictatorship, headed by Stepan Shahumyan. On the night of March 15, he survived an assassination attempt on the street by three Turkish agents, which led to the amputation of one of his legs. Despite the severe wound, he took part in the fighting during the March Days and in the defense against the Turkish and Tatar combined forces in the summer. In early autumn 1918, he was appointed by the Centrocaspian Dictatorship as Minister of War. On September 15 at 11:00, the British, without warning, withdrew their troops, exposing entire sections, leading to the fall of the city to the Islamic Army of the Caucasus in the Battle of Baku. Anticipating the turn of events, Bagratouni took off 1,500 troops with 8,000 refugees on 16 September 1918 and left for Persia to Anzali Port. On the same day the Turks broke in Baku, the massacre to thousands of Armenians took place during the September Days, the last major massacre of World War I.

Upon return of the British troops in Baku on 18 November, Bagratuni traveled back to the Armenian National Council. He was also keenly interested in the Armenian defense in Zangezur and Nagorno-Karabakh led by General Andranik Ozanian. A letter sent by Bagratuni to General Andranik, along with money to help defend against the invading Turks in Zangezur, dated 12 December 1918, states: "I send you one million rubles, of which 400,000 should be allocated to the military, and the remaining 600,000 for assistance to refugees - local and from distant places."

In 1919, he was part of the delegation of Armenia to the Paris Peace Conference as an adviser. He was part of an Armenian military mission in August 1919 aimed at the United States for talks on cooperation in the defense sector. The mission arrived in New York City in November 1919. Bagratouni met with many American politicians and public figures, spoke at rallies, and insisted on helping Armenia and the official recognition of the First Republic of Armenia. On 3 January 1920, Bagratuni received Robert Lansing, the US Secretary of State. The Secretary of State gave a memorandum in which it was stated that the Armenians, in the presence of weapons and uniforms, on their own would return the Armenian territory left to the Turks under the Armistice of Mudros. Despite the fact that Armenia had already set up embassies in several countries, Lansing explained the US authorities couldn't provide military assistance to countries that are not officially recognized.

After completion of the mission, he returned to France in 1920 and was appointed Ambassador of Armenia to Britain, where he remained in exile. Bagratuni died on 23 December 1943 in Lostwithiel in Cornwall. After a funeral at the Armenian Church in London on 3 January 1944, he was buried at Brompton Cemetery.

== Personal life ==
Bagratuni was married to Lidia Kudoyarova, a daughter of an official in Tashkent. They got married on January 31, 1914, at Spaso-Preobrazhensky Military Cathedral in Tashkent.

== Awards ==
- (Russian Empire) Order of St. Anna, 4th class, "For Bravery" (1905)
- (Russian Empire) Order of Saint Stanislaus, 3rd class with Swords (1907)
- (Russian Empire) Order of St. Anna, 3rd class (1912)
- Order of the Golden Star of Bukhara, 3rd class (1914)
- (Russian Empire) Order of Saint Stanislaus, 2nd class with Swords (1914)
- (Russian Empire) Order of St. Vladimir, 4th class with Swords (1914)
- (Russian Empire) Order of St. Vladimir, 3rd class with Swords (1915)
- (Russian Empire) George Arms (1915)
- (Russian Empire) Order of St. Anna, 2nd class with Swords (1916)
- (Russian Empire) Order of St. George, 4th class (1917)
