= Kronstadt mutinies =

The naval fort of Kronstadt has been the site of several mutinies during the early 20th century, most notably in the context of the 1905 and 1917 Russian revolutions.

== 1905 Russian Revolution ==
=== 1905 ===
On 26 October [O.S.] 1905, a group of approximately 50 soldiers of the Second Kronstadt Infantry Battalion tried to present their demands and grievances to their regiment commander, Colonel Osipov. When Osipov refused to listen to the soldier's demands, the soldiers began rioting, which resulted in their arrest. As the soldiers were being led away, a crowd of sailors, soldiers and civilians attempted to help them and a guard opened fire, killing a sailor. Following this, the majority of the 13,000 sailors stationed at the Kronstadt naval base stormed the streets and engaged in looting and arson.

=== 1906 ===
In early 1906, a secret committee was formed by activists from the Socialist Revolutionary and Bolshevik parties among the sailors of Kronstadt, with the Socialist Revolutionaries dominating the committee. This committee led a failed uprising on 19 July [O.S.] 1906, during which resulted in the deaths of four officers, four sailors and one civilian.

== 1917 Russian Revolution ==
When news of the unrest in Petrograd reached the Kronstadt naval base, the majority of the sailors stationed there mutinied against their officers, beginning on the night of 28 February [O.S.] 1917. Over the course of the uprising, approximately 40 officers were killed by the mutineers, including the commander-in-chief of the naval base Admiral Robert Wiren.

== See also ==
- Junker mutiny
- Kronstadt rebellion
