= Georgy Polkovnikov =

Russian colonel (1883–1918)

Georgy Petrovich Polkovnikov
- Георгий Петрович Полковников
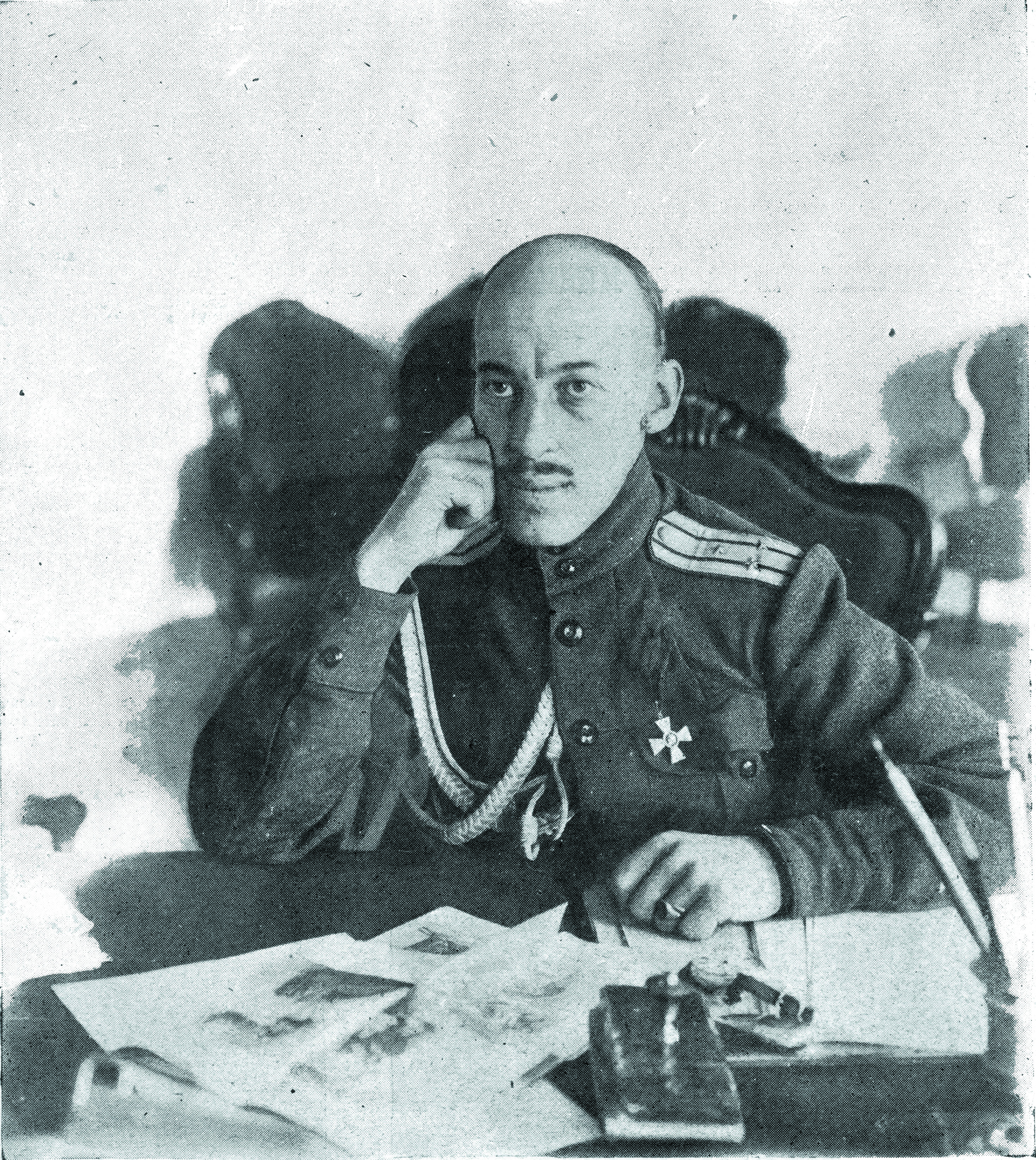
- Georgy Polkovnikov in 1917
- Born: March 7, 1883; Stanitsa Krivyanskaya, Don Host Oblast
- Died: 1918 (aged 34–35)
- Military career
- Allegiance: Russian Empire
- Service years: 1904–1917
- Rank: Colonel
- Commands: Petrograd Military District (September 17, 1917 – November 7, 1917)
- Conflicts: Russian–Japanese War; World War I Russian Civil War
- Awards: Saint George Weapon; Order of Saint George; Order of Saint Vladimir; Order of Saint Anna; Order of Saint Stanislaus

Georgy Petrovich Polkovnikov (Russian: Георгий Петрович Полковников; March 7, 1883 – March 1918) was a Russian military leader, commander–in–chief of the Petrograd Military District in September – October 1917, his last military rank was colonel.

== Biography ==
Born into the family of a Cossack officer. Graduated from the Mikhailovskoye Artillery School (1904). Member of the Russo-Japanese War. In 1912, he graduated from the Academy of the General Staff. After graduating from the academy, he commanded a hundred in the 12th Don Cossack Regiment.

During World War I, he served at the headquarters of the 11th Cavalry Division of the 5th Cavalry Corps, and then in the Ussuri Cavalry Division. On March 1, 1916, he was awarded the Order of Saint George, 4th Degree for the distinction in battles.

From February 1917 – Chief of Staff of the Ussuri Cavalry Division. Since July 1917, he commanded the 1st Amur Cossack Regiment of the 3rd Cavalry Corps of General Alexander Krymov.

During the Kornilov Revolt, together with the regiment, he took the side of the Provisional Government. With this in mind, on September 17, 1917, he was appointed commander–in–chief of the troops of the Petrograd Military District. From September 29, 1917, after the reassignment of the district directly to the commander of the Northern Front, he began to be called the chief of the district.

Before the October Uprising, he conducted negotiations with the Petrograd Military Revolutionary Committee on November 4–5. On November 7, 1917, on the eve of the uprising, he was removed by the Provisional Government from his post for "indecision" in the fight against the advancing revolution and replaced by the chief of staff, General Yakov Bagratuni.

On November 11, 1917, as the commander of the army of the Committee for the Salvation of the Motherland and the Revolution, he led the Cadet Action in Petrograd after he had developed his plan. The revolt was suppressed the next day, November 12, 1917, by the Bolsheviks, and Polkovnikov tried to move to the Don. In March 1918, he was arrested by the organs of Soviet power in the Zadonskaya Steppe and was shot by the verdict of the Revolutionary Tribunal.

== Opinions of contemporaries ==
Peter Krasnov:

Polkovnikov is a product of the new era. This is the type of officers who made a revolution for the sake of a career, flew like butterflies into a fire, and burned in it without a trace. <...> The 34–year–old colonel becomes the commander–in–chief of the most politically important district with almost 200,000 army. Here begins a rush between Kerensky and the Soviet and loyalty insofar as. The colonel helps the Bolsheviks create a movement against the government, but then leads the cadets against the Bolsheviks. He took on a lot of children's blood...

== Sources ==
- David Golinkov. Who Was the Organizer of the Junker Uprising in October 1917 // Questions of History – 1966 – No. 3
- Ivan Lutovinov. Elimination of the Kerensky–Krasnov Mutiny – Moscow, 1965
