= Vikzhel =

Russian revolutionary industrial union

The All-Russian Executive Committee of the Union of Railwaymen (Russian: Всероссийский исполнительный комитет железнодорожного профсоюза), commonly known in English by its Cyrillic acronym, Vikzhel, was the governing body of an industrial union established in revolutionary Russia during the summer of 1917. Inclined towards syndicalism and standing as one of the most radical Russian unions of the period, Vikzhel played a decisive role in stymying the attempted Kornilov coup in August 1917.

At the time of the October Revolution Vikzhel was the largest and best organized union in Russia. Simultaneously but independent of the Bolshevik Party's seizure of state power, Vikzhel would seize control of Russia's railways in the fall of 1917. Favoring a multi-party government, Vikzhel managed to leverage its position of strength through threat of a general transportation strike to force the Bolsheviks to add other socialist political parties to the previously all-Bolshevik government — a power play culminated by the provision of three ministerial portfolios to representatives of the Left Socialist Revolutionary Party.

Vikzhel's limited success in pushing the Bolsheviks towards compromise and moderation proved to be short-lived, however, as the fledgling Soviet government soon manufactured a split of the All-Russian Union of Railwaymen and establishment of a rival governing Executive Committee known as Vikzhedor. Supplanted by the new Bolshevik-friendly organization, Vikzhel was ultimately dissolved in March 1918 by decree of the governing Council of People's Commissars (Sovnarkom).

== History ==
=== Background ===
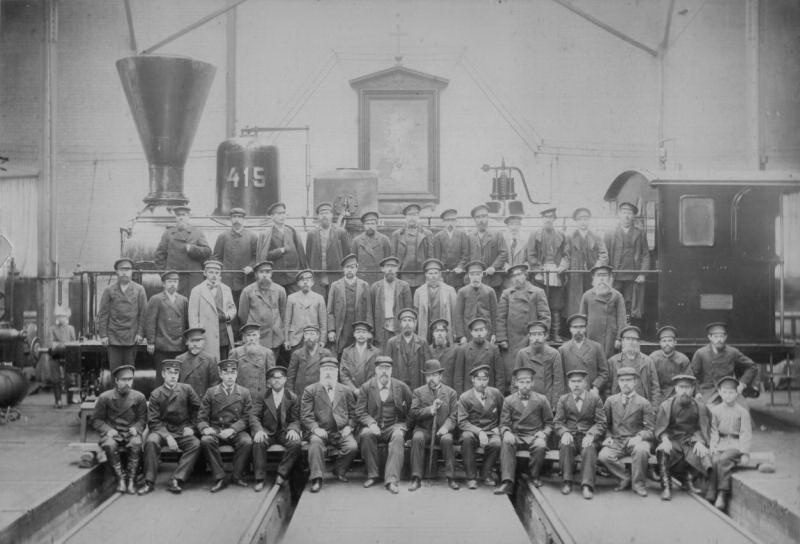
Russian railroaders from Ryabinsk, circa 1890.

During the Russian Revolution of 1905 a pioneering effort was made to organize Russian railway workers into an All-Russian Union of Railwaymen. This forerunner of the 1917 labor organization by the same name conducted a strike in October 1905 which had escalated into a general strike in St. Petersburg and Moscow, paving the way for formation of the short-lived St. Petersburg Soviet of Workers' Delegates.

The revolt against Tsarism soon collapsed, however, and the government of Tsar Nicholas II pushed back with a December 14 (O.S.) decree allowing railway lines to be placed under martial law. The lengthy decree provided for the summary arrest of workers failing to following the orders of railway authorities, backed by jail terms of up to three months and fines of up to 500 rubles without trial. Gatherings of railway workers were prohibited, with strikers subject to immediate dismissal and possible arrest. So-called "punitive expeditions" aboard armored trains were quickly dispatched to take action against organized strikers.

Some 150 railway strikers and bystanders were killed in massacres following the imposition of martial law. More than 59,000 railway workers were ultimately terminated from their jobs as a result of the repression in 1906 and 1907, although many of these ultimately regained employment elsewhere in the Russian railroad industry following defeat of the revolution. The Russian railway union was thus effectively crushed.

=== Establishment ===
Following the overthrow of Tsarism in the February Revolution of 1917, workers found no governmental obstacles to their self-organization into labor unions. Railway workers were in the front ranks of this effort, rapidly unionizing themselves as the All-Russian Union of Railwaymen at a convention held in Moscow on April 6, 1917 (O.S.). The 200 delegates to this gathering decided to establish themselves as a single industry-wide industrial union rather than as an alliance of specialized craft unions organizing workers based upon their specific tasks. A decentralized structure was agreed upon, which had the benefit of fostering local initiative but at the expense of united national action. The organizational conference set July 15, 1917 (O.S.) as the date for a formal First All-Russian Congress of Railwaymen to perfect its organizational form.

Some 500 delegates assembled in Moscow on July 15 for the convocation of the First Congress, with the left wing of the Socialist Revolutionary Party in clear numerical domination. This gathering elected a governing council, an All-Russian Executive Committee, to conduct the affairs of the railway union between conventions. A total of 40 people were elected to this All-Russian Executive Committee of the Union of Railwaymen, known by its acronym Vikzhel. Of these, just two were members of the Bolshevik Party — which remained at this juncture a radical anti-war opposition party to the Provisional Government headed by Alexander Kerensky. These were part of a left wing of 15, which included as well Left Socialist-Revolutionaries and Menshevik-Internationalists. The majority moderate faction included members of the Right Socialist Revolutionary, Menshevik, and Popular Socialist parties.

As the economic crisis of 1917 expanded and the country became more radical, Vikzhel likewise shifted to the left, with Left SR A.L. Malitskii assuming the chairmanship of the organization on September 15 (O.S.). Vikzhel remained far from lockstep with the waxing Bolshevik forces, however, with the union remaining committed to the essentially syndicalist principles of decentralization and workers' control in contrast to the hard centralism touted by the Bolsheviks. Vikzhel rapidly developed amidst the chaos into which the country had descended, establishing itself as the largest and best organized union in Russia by the fall of 1917.

=== Kornilov Affair ===
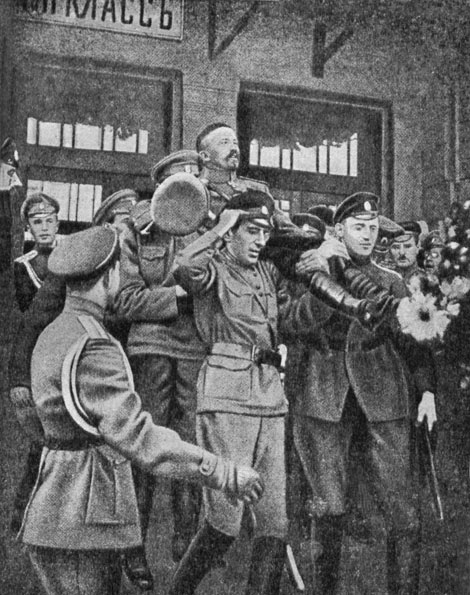
Gen. Lavr Kornilov (1870–1918) heroically riding upon the shoulders of his officers, July 1, 1917 (O.S.).

Alexander Kerensky (1881–1970), head of state of the Russian Provisional Government of 1917.

One of the most historically significant episodes involving Vikzhel occurred during the Kornilov affair of August 1917. The spontaneous street riots known as the July Days had fizzled and been suppressed, leading to a public discrediting of the Bolshevik Party that had belatedly supported such direct action and a turn in public opinion towards firm central government. A sense of despair filled the country, marked by daily reports of peasant lawlessness in the countryside, worker strikes in the cities, moves toward national separation in Finland and Ukraine, collapse of military discipline at the war front, chaos and violence in the streets, and a collapse of the economic system. Prime Minister Kerensky proved powerless to stave this escalating crisis, with his cabinet disunited on a single course of action and the strength of the Petrograd Soviet looming ominously over his shoulder, ready to call the masses into the streets in protest once more in the event of a repressive misstep.

A broad array of conservative forces, including business leaders and their All-Russian Union of Trade and Industry, gentry representatives organized in the Union of Landowners, and military officers of the Union of Officers and Union of Cossack Troops rapidly lost faith in the Kerensky government to find its way out of the crisis. The monarchist tradition instilled by centuries of Tsarist rule loomed strong, and a drumbeat grew among the right for an overthrow of the stumbling young republic in favor of military leadership over the nation and its economy. A consensus emerged among these rightist elements to tap General Lavr Kornilov, commander-in-chief of the Russian army for the role of plenipotentiary leader of the Russian nation. Moreover, Kornilov's public status among middle class society was momentarily high, enhanced by the short-lived military successes of the army's June offensive, with which he was credited.

Kornilov was dismissive of the February revolution and its move towards increased civilian control of the military and the creeping of political activity into army ranks. He sought instead a purge of the officer corps and the expansion of special courts and capital punishment as a mechanism to restore military discipline and saw the continued existence of the moderate socialist Kerensky government as a fetter upon the implementation of this agenda. Kerensky reciprocated these feelings of mistrust, seeing in Kornilov an ambitious reactionary intent upon overthrow of the revolution and establishment of a military dictatorship in its stead — a sentiment shared by a substantial number of radicalized workers, fearing a new campaign of state repression akin to that which followed the collapse of the 1905 uprising.

In August Kornilov prepared the ground for a political offensive, visiting Petrograd and putting forward a plan to put the Petrograd Military District — previously controlled by Kerensky's Ministry of War — under his own personal authority. He also visited Moscow, upstaging the tepid reception given to the arrival of government ministers to a formal state conference with a carefully orchestrated railway ceremony featuring a military honor guard, saber-wielding Turkmen guards, and a military band. An uneasy political dance followed between Kerensky and Kornilov, in which each attempted to use the other to bolster his own claim as supreme leader of a future Russian government.

Late in August (Old Style calendar) a concrete plot for a military coup was hatched for Kornilov by the Main Committee of the Union of Officers and the Republican Center and Military League, timed to coincide with the August 27 official celebration of the 6-month anniversary of the revolution. The festivities would be accompanied by street disorder, the plotters assumed, making plausible a declaration of martial law to restore order, under cloak of which a change in government could be made.

Kerensky learned of the plot shortly before its execution and on August 26 sought and obtained self-dissolution of the cabinet for subsequent "restructuring" and the granting of unlimited authority by the outgoing cabinet to deal with Kornilov's "treachery" as he saw fit. Kerensky proved unable to by himself to divert the movement of Kornilov's troops to the capital, however, his telegraphic advice that "Petrograd is completely calm and no insurrections are expected" falling upon deaf ears. On August 27, troops personally loyal to Kornilov boarded trains heading for the capital city. Although the 6-month celebration of the revolution came and went, Kornilov's plan for a military takeover moved forward, with stock prices on the Petrograd stock exchange rocketing upwards on August 28 in anticipation of a rapid victory.

It was here that Vikzhel played its historic role. On August 27, in conjunction with the celebration of the revolution, the Petrograd Soviet issued an emergency appeal to soldiers, telegraph operators, and railway workers to come to the defense of the revolution, declaring that orders of the military high command were to be ignored and the movement of counterrevolutionary troops stymied. That same day Vikzhel established a special committee dedicated to the military emergency created by Kornilov. Vikzhel sent telegrams up and down the railway network, demanding the stoppage of "suspicious telegrams" and the rapid transmission of information about the size and destination of any troop movements by rail. Railway workers were directed to delay and halt the movement of troops by any means necessary, up to and including sidetracking, abandoning their posts, blocking the right of way, and dismantling track.

Combined with the mobilization of soldiers and formation of Red Guards units of armed factory workers in the city of Petrograd, the delaying actions of the Russian railway workers to block troop movements — coordinated by Vikzhel — proved decisive. By the evening of August 29 the inadequacy of Kornilov's forces in the face of a newly united opposition had become apparent to all, and the coup's forces began to melt away. Delayed troops riding the rails were isolated and surrounded, the situation explained and illegal orders repudiated, and new vows of loyalty sworn to the revolutionary government.

=== October Revolution ===
With V.I. Ul'ianov (Lenin) and the Bolsheviks seized power in Petrograd and Moscow on October 25 (O.S.) (November 7), 1917, Vikzhel asserted itself as a rival nexus of power. As historian E. H. Carr observed:

"From the moment of the October revolution Vikzhel took over the administration of the railways on its own account and acted as an independent power. In short, it played the role of a mammoth factory committee exercising 'workers' control.' It recognized no political authority, and no interest other than the professional interest of the railwayman."

The two sides came into direct conflict for the first time on the day after the Bolshevik victory, at the second and last session of the 2nd All-Russian Congress of Soviets. It was there that Lev Kamenev announced the appointment of a new all-Bolshevik Council of People's Commissars (Sovnarkom) to head the country's executive and political functions. This information was met by a representative of Vikzhel who upon remonstration was allowed to read a written statement of Vikzhel in which the union expressed its "negative attitude to the seizure of power by any one political party" and called for the formation of "a revolutionary socialist government responsible to the plenipotentiary organ of the whole revolutionary democracy." Moreover, Vikzhel threatened that it and it alone would assume control of the country's railways and threatened to cut off supplies to the city of Petrograd should efforts at repression be made by the new government.

The Bolshevik authorities, struggling to maintain control of the city of Petrograd and still engaged in a fight to win control in Moscow, stood powerless to contest Vikzhel's ultimatum. Pressured by a threat of a general strike on the railroads, the Bolsheviks grudgingly entered into negotiations with other socialist parties with the object of establishing a multi-party government in accordance with Vikzel's demands.

For its part Vikzhel attempted to help establish a broad coalition against one-party Bolshevik rule and the inevitable civil war which was expected to follow, joining with representatives of moderate socialist political parties to form a group called the Committee to Save the Country and Revolution with a view to the successful launch of the multi-party Constituent Assembly and to achievement of a "democratic peace" in the ongoing war with the German empire.

=== Post-revolutionary discord ===
The October 28 (O.S.) general strike threat which put Bolshevik leaders into negotiations with other political parties did not generate an immediate agreement, however. Lenin and the Bolshevik Party stalled for two days as discord grew in the streets of Petrograd. Finally the decision was made by the Bolsheviks to enter discussions with the representatives of other parties and three days of nearly continuous negotiations at Vikzhel headquarters ensued. With Kamenev leading the Bolshevik side in these negotiations, the decision was reached for the creation of a new Council of People's Commissars featuring a non-Bolshevik majority.

The Bolshevik Party was deeply divided over the deal negotiated by Kamenev, with top party leaders Lenin and Leon Trotsky bitterly opposed to the surrender of control to other organizations. The majority of the governing Central Committee of the Bolshevik Party favored the continuation of negotiations, however, fearing overstepping what was possible and making a move which would alienate the party's core constituency of urban factory workers. Although power sharing negotiations were to be continued, the decision was made to harden the negotiating posture in an effort to drive out moderate elements from the discussions. Opponents of this hard line were threatened with expulsion for violation of party discipline if their resistance did not cease.

Vikzhel was again stalled by the Bolsheviks, who dodged a meeting scheduled for November 4 (17) and forced a rescheduling to November 6 (19), a meeting which again failed to come to an agreement on the size and structure of the division of state offices. Parties across the spectrum were alienated by the Bolsheviks' intransigence, with representatives of the Bund and Menshevik Party expressing the view that coalition government had become impossible.

Negotiations slowly slogged forward for more than two weeks, finally ending on November 15 (O.S.) (28), 1917 with the granting of three seats on Sovnarkom to members of the Left SR party. Somewhat surprisingly, this one-sided coalition of just two parties proved sufficient for Vikzhel's purposes, a concession sweetened with the granting of the post of People's Commissar of Communications to a former member of Vikzhel himself. Vikzhel seems to have put its faith in the forthcoming Constituent Assembly, elections for which has been held, and were willing to forgive a short-lived government with only the most limited non-Bolshevik participation in the belief that a more representative, non-Bolshevik government was in the offing.

The All-Russian Union of Railwaymen was at that time holding another national congress and it narrowly passed a vote of confidence in the Bolshevik government — a move taken by the Bolsheviks as an assertion of continued independent authority. The Bolsheviks, sensing a radical mood among the union's rank and file which was supportive of the Communist demand for a unified socialist government, went over Vikzhel's head, generating a split of left wing delegates to the congress. These bolters established a parallel organization, headed by a new executive body known as Vikzhedor.

=== Dissolution ===
Vikzhel was dissolved by a decree issued by the Council of People's Commissars (Sovnarkom) in March 26 1918.

== See also ==
- Vikzhel negotiations
