= Extraordinary All-Russia Congress Of Soviets Of Peasants' Deputies =

The Extraordinary All-Russia Congress Of Soviets Of Peasants' Deputies was held between November 10-25, 1917. The Congress was attended by a majority of Socialist-Revolutionaries and was the scene of a political struggle between Left Socialist-Revolutionaries (Left SRs) and Right Socialist-Revolutionaries. It facilitated the development of a closer working relationship between the Left SRs. Lenin delivered a speech on 18 November in which he outlined how alliance of the peasants and workers would provide a basis for an agreement between the Left Socialist-Revolutionaries and the Bolsheviks.
