= Third All-Russia Congress of Soviets of Peasants' Deputies =

The Third All-Russia Congress of Soviets of Peasants’ Deputies was held at the Smolny Institute, Petrograd on 26 January 1918 [O.S. 13 January 1918]. The Socialist Revolutionary Party (SRs) wanted to keep the Congress Peasants' Deputies separate from that of the Congress of Workers’ and Soldiers’ Deputies which was being run concurrently at the Tauride Palace, also in Petrograd. However, during the first session, the Bolshevik, Yakov Sverdlov, the Chairman of the All-Russian Central Executive Committee proposed a motion for the Congress to merge with that of the Third All-Russian Congress of Soviets of Workers’ and Soldiers’ Deputies. Despite opposition from the SRs and the Mensheviks, the motion was passed with the support Bolsheviks and the Left Socialist Revolutionaries, thereby transforming the two congresses into the Third All-Russian Congress of Workers', Soldiers' and Peasants Deputies' Soviets.
