= Kerensky–Krasnov uprising =

Attempted coup to reverse the October Revolution

- Part of the Russian Civil War
Date	8–13 November 1917 [O.S. 26–31 October]
Location	Petrograd Governorate
Result	Soviet Russia victory; Defeat of Kerensky

Belligerents
(Russian Socialist Federative Soviet Republic) Soviet Russia	(Russia) Russian Republic

Commanders and leaders
(Russian Socialist Federative Soviet Republic) Vladimir Lenin (Russian Socialist Federative Soviet Republic) Nikolai Krylenko (Russian Socialist Federative Soviet Republic) Vladimir Antonov-Ovseenko (Russian Socialist Federative Soviet Republic) Pavel Dybenko	(Russia) Alexander Kerensky (Russia) Pyotr Krasnov

Strength
~5,000 men	700 men (of which 600 cavalry); 12 cannons 1 armoured vehicle

The Kerensky–Krasnov uprising was an attempt by Alexander Kerensky to crush the October Revolution and regain power after the Bolsheviks overthrew his government in Petrograd. It took place between 8 and 13 November 1917 [O.S. 26 and 31 October].

Following the October Revolution, Kerensky fled Petrograd, which fell to the Bolshevik-controlled Petrograd Soviet and went to Pskov, the headquarters of the Northern Front command. He did not get the support of its commander, General Vladimir Cheremisov, who prevented his attempts to gather units to march on Petrograd, but he did get the support of General Pyotr Krasnov, who advanced on the capital with about 700 Cossacks. In Petrograd, opponents of the October Revolution were preparing a revolt that would coincide with the attack on the city by Kerensky's forces.

The Soviets had to improvise the defense of the hills south of the city and wait for the attack of Kerensky's troops, who, despite the efforts of the high command, received no reinforcements. The clash in the Pulkovo Heights ended with the withdrawal of the Cossacks after the Junker mutiny, which failed prematurely, and they did not receive the necessary support from other units to force the defences. Talks between the sides ended with Kerensky's flight, fearful of being handed over to the Soviets by his own soldiers, effectively ending attempts to restore the overthrown Russian Provisional Government.

== Background ==
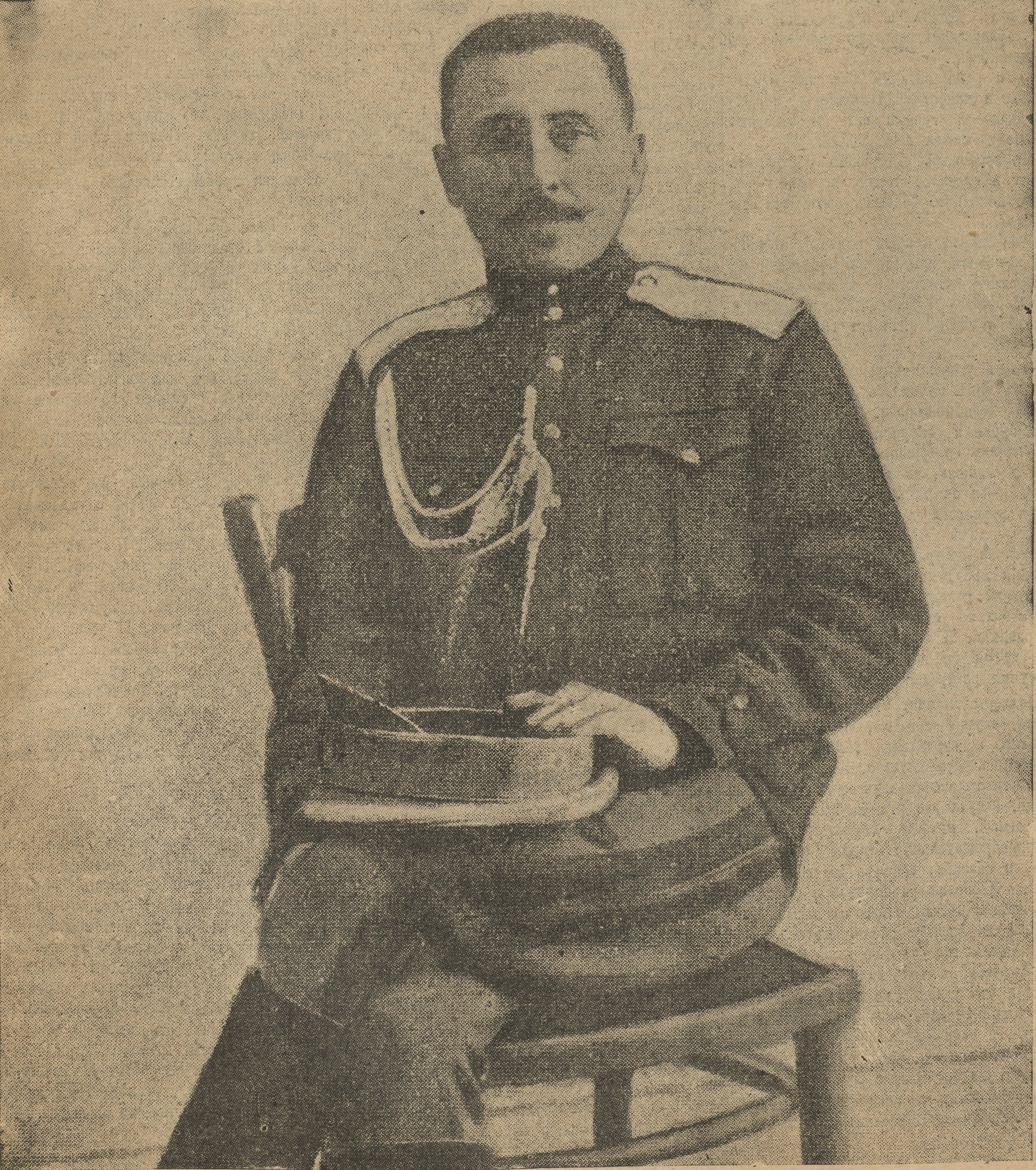
General Vladimir Cheremisov, commander of the Northern Front. An antagonist of Kerensky with pro-Bolshevik troops, Cheremisov hampered Kerensky's efforts to regain power

Alexander Kerensky, who had left Petrograd during the October Revolution, looked for troops that might come to the capital, but did not find them until he arrived to Pskov, where he arrived around 9 pm on 7 November [O.S. 25 October]. In the first town with troops near the capital, Gatchina, the soldiers were pro-Bolshevik, and Kerensky narrowly escaped arrest.

In Pskov was the headquarters of the Northern Front under the command of General Cheremisov; there Kerensky came into contact with General Pyotr Krasnov, commander of the 3rd Cavalry Corps, which participated in the Kornilov putsch. Together they gathered a Corps to march over the capital, despite the doubts of his commissar, who was suspicious of the reliability of some troops who were hostile to Kerensky. Krasnov, a monarchist officer, was not a great a supporter of Kerensky, but believed his claim that the majority of the army would support him against the Bolsheviks.

In turn, Cheremisov, whose troops were effectively under Bolshevik control and who had bad relations with Kerensky, had rescinded the orders to help the Provisional Government by sending him to Petrograd. Upon his arrival, I had informed him that he could not guarantee his safety if he remained in the city and that he had to leave immediately. Cheremisov refused to help the former prime minister. The local Military Revolutionary Committee controlled communications and transport and monitored the actions of the commanders. Cheremisov had also obstructed Kerensky's communications with the others. commanders of the front and communicated to the high command his appointment as commander-in-chief and the order to stop the march of troops on the capital, both false reports.

== Military operations ==
On the night of 8 November [O.S. 26 October], Kerensky was again on the outskirts of the capital with little over six hundred Cossacks — twelve and a half squads of sixty men, forming two regiments of the 1st Don Cossack Division — some cannons, an armored convoy and an armored car. The dispersion of the III Corps and the lack of support for Kerensky among the troops prevented the assembly of larger forces, and only those that were stationed in Ostrov marched towards the capital. Krasnov, however, was confident that his cossack troops would receive reinforcements. The few Cossacks crossed Pskov by train at full speed to avoid clashes with the troops occupying the station and continued towards Gatchina.

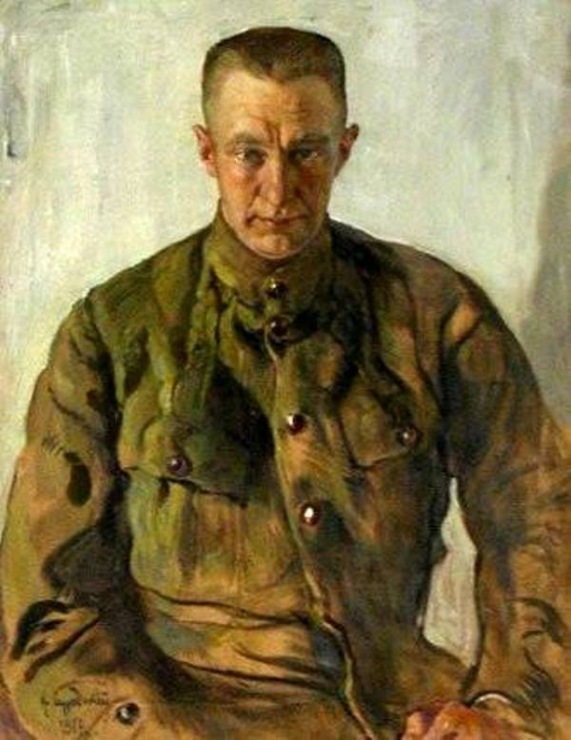
The overthrown president of the Russian Provisional Government, Alexander Kerensky, who tried, in vain, to regain control of Petrograd with the few Cossack troops who agreed to march against the city.

The next morning, troops took Gatchina without encountering resistance and prepared to assault the Bolshevik positions while awaiting reinforcements. Various circumstances, however, prevented the arrival of new forces to Kerensky: the neutrality of many officers in the conflict, such as the commander of the Northern Front, General Cheremisov, the refusal of the majority of the army to fight, the growing influence of the Bolsheviks in the troops and the reluctance of railway workers to collaborate in the operation. Cheremisov, with bad relations with Kerensky due to a previous personal offense, had ordered that none troops were sent to the capital the day before, declaring that the army should not mix in politics. Kerensky received only reinforcements from an armored convoy and a regiment from Luga. In Gatchina, only a few officers from the aviation school joined Krasnov's Cossacks; contributed a couple of planes and an armored car and dropped leaflets over the capital. After midnight on 10 November [O.S. 28 October], small forces, whose size was exaggerated by the government of Lenin who believed they were much larger, took the Tsarskoye Selo. Here the first fight took place; Krasnov, however, drove out the Red Guards with his light artillery. His advance, however, was slow due to lack of reinforcements, especially infantry. At Tsarskoye Selo, the great garrison — sixteen thousand men — who outnumbered Krasnov's forces twenty to one, declared his neutrality in the confrontation. In turn, the Bolshevik Revolutionary Military Committee prepared to defend the capital and sent forward the best troops it had in Petrograd. Red Guards, civilians and sailors joined the garrison units that departed south of the city to mount defenses. The command has been placed in the hands of Colonel Muraviov, to whom Chudnovsky was attached as a commissioner; Trotsky and Pavel Dybenko accompanied them to supervise the operation.

Meanwhile, in Petrograd, ex-ministers Mensheviks encouraged officials to oppose the new Bolshevik government, the Sovnarkom, through strikes, and supporters of the old government, coordinated by the Committee for the Salvation of the Homeland and Revolution, controlled by the Socialist Revolutionary Party (PSR), planned a revolt simultaneously with Kerensky's impending attack. The presidency of the dissolved Preparliament called for a revolt against the Lenin government. The chief military commissar of the deposed Provisional Government, Stankevich, left to meet with Kerensky in Gatchina to coordinate the revolt in the city and the advance of Kerensky's troops.

After the failure of the junker mutiny in Petrograd, which had to be precipitated when it was discovered, some members of the PSR Central Committee joined Kerensky after fleeing the capital. Krasnov's troops made no attempt to help the rebels in the capital. Avram Gots supported the search for infantry to reinforce the Cossacks on their march on the capital, both at the front and in the garrisons around the city, which had thousands of soldiers. At the front, the Mensheviks and Social Revolutionaries predominated in the unit committees, but not among the soldiers, who were increasingly close to the Bolsheviks. The army closest to the capital, the 12th, belonging to the Northern Front and with two pro-Bolshevik Latvian divisions selected, elected its council, which turned out to consist of supporters and opponents of the October Revolution; the few units sent to the capital refused to advance beyond Valka. The other two armies on the Northern Front, the 1st and 5th. º, were even more pro-Bolshevik and opposed to Kerensky's support. For their part, the Gatchina and Tsarskoye Selo garrisons had declared themselves neutral and did not support the attack by Kerensky to the capital. In the end, various efforts to obtain more troops, either from the front or from the nearby garrisons, proved fruitless.

On 12 November [O.S. 30 October], faced with reports of excesses in the capital after the crushing the revolt of the cadets, tried to advance from the Tsarskoye Selo against the entrenched Bolshevik forces, which were twenty times as numerous. Despite advancing easily against the Red Guards, the Cossacks found themselves in danger of being attacked on their flanks by the marines commanded by Dybenko. The Cossacks were repulsed in the Pulkovo Heights and had to evacuate Tsarskoye Selo and return to Gatchina to avoid being surrounded. The confrontation had been messy and bloody. The forces of Kerensky began to disperse in retreat and some of them fraternized with the Bolsheviks in hopes of returning home. Lack of support had sapped the morale of Kerensky's few Cossack troops.

By 14 November [O.S. 1 November], the situation had deteriorated to the point that Kerensky was in danger of being arrested by his own men and handed over to the Bolsheviks; the leaders of the Socialist Revolutionary Party forced him to flee dressed as a sailor. Kerensky's escape ended hopes of restoring the Provisional Government; after that the opponents of the October Revolution did not try to revive it, but to create a new alternative government to the Bolsheviks. The defeat of Kerensky, together with the Bolshevik victory in the heavy fighting in Moscow, temporarily secured the power of Lenin and his supporters; the capital was temporarily safe from military attack.

In turn, Krasnov was captured, but soon released after promising not to fight the Soviet authorities, a promise he quickly broke by becoming the leader of an anti-Bolshevik movement — the Don Republic.

== See also ==
- Vikzhel negotiations
