= Petersburg Military District =

Military district of the Russian Empire

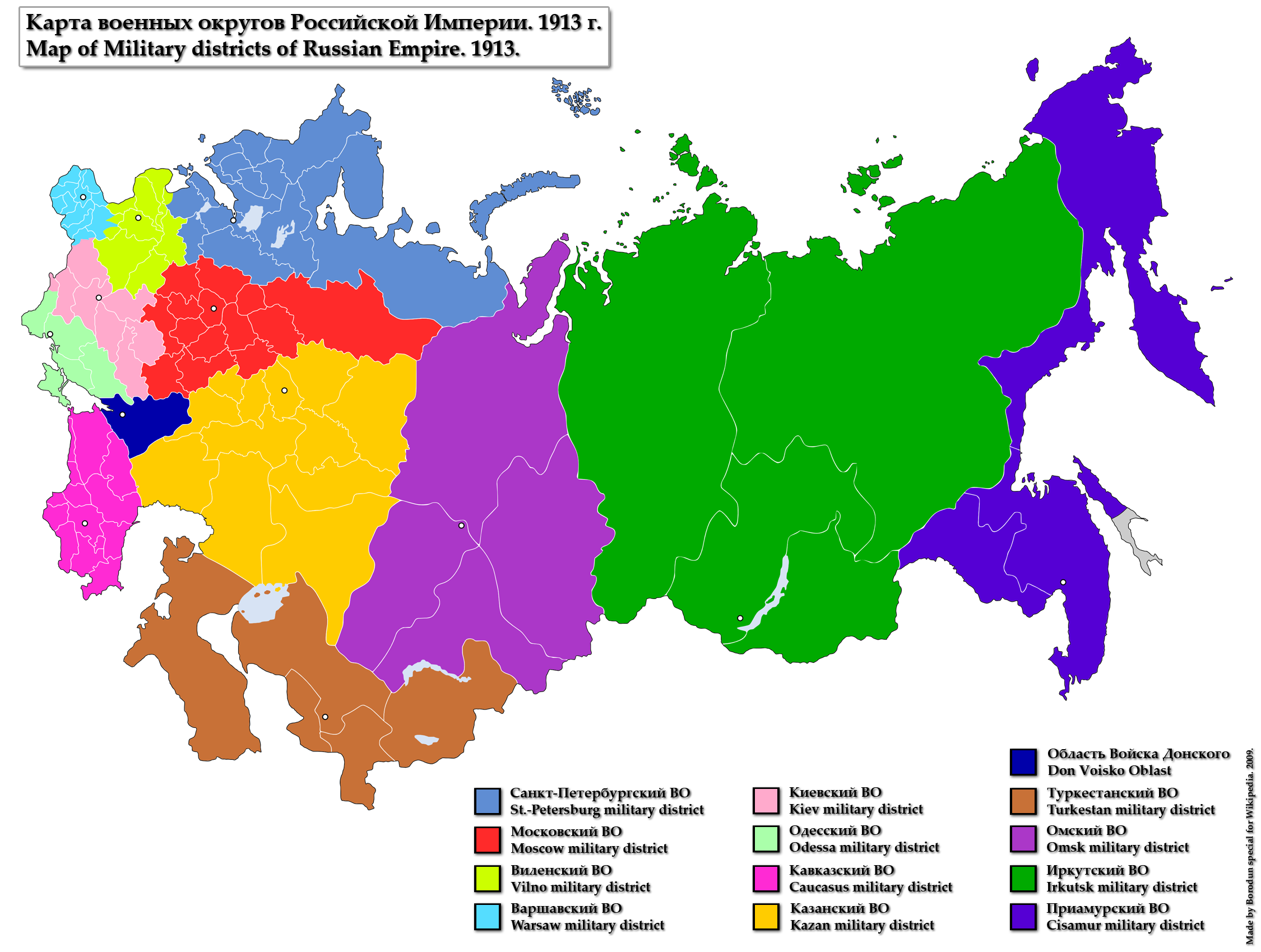
Military Districts of the Russian Empire, 1913

The Petersburg Military District (Russian: Питербургский военный округ), known as the Petrograd Military District from 1914, was a military district of the Russian Empire and Russian Republic.

== History ==
It was originally created in August 1864 by order of Dmitry Milyutin, the minister of war. The order, signed on 10 August (N.S. 22 August), established that "for local control of the Ground Armed Forces and military establishments, are formed [...] Military-regional administrations in the following ten military districts" of which one was Petersburg. The district's forces gained combat experience in the Russo-Turkish War of 1877–1878 and the Russo-Japanese War of 1904–1905. The Finnish Military District was merged into the Petersburg Military District in 1905.

By decision of Emperor Nicholas II on 24 August 1914, it was renamed the Petrograd Military District. Following the Bolshevik seizure of power, the Petrograd Military District of the Red Army was established in its place on 20 March 1918. On 6 September 1918, by order of the Revolutionary Military Council, it was again re-established. On 1 February 1924, by order of the Revolutionary Military Council of the Soviet Union, the Petrograd Military District was renamed the Leningrad Military District.

== Commander of the Saint Petersburg Military District ==
- 08.1864 - 04.1880 - Adjutant General, Engineer General, Grand Duke Nikolai Nikolaevich;
- 04.1880 - 03.1881 - General of Infantry, Tsarevich Grand Duke Alexander Alexandrovich (from 01/03/1881 Emperor Alexander III);
- 03.1881 - 10.1905 - Adjutant General, General of Infantry, Grand Duke Vladimir Alexandrovich;
- 10.1905 - 07.1914 - adjutant general, general of the cavalry, Grand Duke Nikolai Nikolaevich;
- 08.1914 - 11.1914 - General of Infantry Baron Nikolai Pavlovich von Asheberg (acting commander of the Petrograd Military District);
- 09.1915 - 06.1916 - engineer-general Prince Nikolai Evseevich Tumanov;
- 06.1916 - 02.1917 - Lieutenant General Sergey Semyonovich Khabalov;
- 02.1917 - 03.1917 - Adjutant General, General of Artillery Nikolai Iudovich Ivanov;
- 03.1917 - 04.1917 - Lieutenant General Lavr Kornilov;
- 04.1917 - 05.1917 - General of Infantry Evgeny Aleksandrovich Radkevich (temporarily);
- 05.1917 - 07.1917 - Major General Peter Polovtsov;
- 07.1917 - 08.1917 - Major General Oleg Petrovich Vasilkovsky;
- 08.1917 - 09.1917 - Lieutenant General Vladimir Vladimirovich Teplov;
- 09.1917 - 10.1917 - Colonel Georgy Polkovnikov;
- 10.1917 - 10.1917 : Major General Yakov Gerasimovich Bagratuni;.

== Disbandment ==
After the October Revolution by order of the Bolshevik head of the Military District Konstantin Eremeev, the old district was disbanded, and on March 20, 1918 on its basis, the Petrograd VO of the Red Army was created, headed by a collegium.
