= Committee for the Salvation of the Homeland and Revolution =

Counterrevolutionary organ in Petrograd (1917)

The All-Russian Committee for the Salvation of the Homeland and the Revolution (ACS), also known as the Committee to Save the Fatherland and the Revolution or the Committee for the Salvation of Russia and the Revolution, was a brief anti-Bolshevik organization created in Petrograd on the night of November 7–8, 1917.

Protesting the attacks on the Russian Provisional Government during the October Revolution, the centrist and right-wing factions of the Mensheviks and Socialist-Revolutionaries (SRs) walked out of the Second All-Russian Congress of Soviets of Workers' and Soldiers' Deputies. They met at the Petrograd City Duma to discuss the situation and decided to form the Committee for Salvation. The Menshevik Central Committee (CC) newspaper reported that the committee contained representatives from the city duma, the First CEC, the Peasant Congress Executive Committee, the factions that left the Second Soviet Congress, the Trade Union of Railway Workers, the SR CC, the Menshevik CC, the Pre-Parliament, and frontline organizations.

One of the first actions of the ACS was to publish a declaration titled "To the Citizens of Russia," stating that the committee is working to recreate the Provisional Government, called upon people to disobey the orders of Milrevcom, and ordered government employees to follow its orders. The committee was "largely an SR enterprise, for Mayor Shreider had taken the initiative in its formation, Avksentiev was its chairman, and Boris Flekkel, its acting director" and "was little more than a front behind which the SR's operated."

Most newspapers in Petrograd sided with the ACS against the new Bolshevik government, leading to many being raided and shut down by Milrevcom. The closures would quickly be endorsed by Sovnarkom in its "Decree on the Press", which stated any newspaper could be shut down if it called for "open resistance or insubordination to the Workers' and Peasants' Government", sowed "sedition through demonstrably slanderous distortion of facts", or instigated "actions of an obviously criminal, i.e. criminally punishable, nature". However, most newspapers that were shut down ended up getting re-established under new names.

The ACS, in coordination with the SR Military Commission, also covertly drew up plans for an armed insurrection in Petrograd that would coincide with a planned offensive from Kerensky and Krasnov. However, one day early, Milrevcom while detaining an ACS leader found a copy of the plans, and so the uprising happened earlier than planned; it was swiftly and brutally repressed with the street-fighting resulting in 200 casualties. The planned Kerensky-Krasnov offensive collapsed shortly thereafter. The failure of these attempts at armed resistance to the Bolsheviks, as well as a meeting with a delegation of Menshevik workers who saw the planned offensive as an attack on the Petrograd proletariat, led the centrist faction of the Mensheviks, led by Fyodor Dan, to move towards peaceful opposition, support for a coalition government including the Bolsheviks, and withdrawal from the ACS. However, the Menshevik-Defencists remained firmly supportive of armed militant resistance to the Bolsheviks government.

Following the failed insurrection, the committee stopped functioning and many of its members were involved in the formation of the Union for the Defense of the Constituent Assembly (UDCA). Following the Constituent Assembly's dissolution, it also ceased to function.

== See also ==
- Uprising of junkers in Petrograd
- Regional Committee in Protection of Revolution in Ukraine
