= Annensky =

Annensky, sometimes Annenskij, feminine: Annenskaya is a Russian surname originated in clergy, derived after Saint Anne. Notable people with the surname include:

- Alexandra Annenskaya, Russian translator and writer
- Innokenty Annensky, Russian poet, critic, scholar, and translator
- Isidor Annensky, Soviet screenwriter and film director
- Nikolai Annensky, Russian economist, statistician and politician

== See also ==
- 3724 Annenskij, an asteroid
