= Rabochaya Mysl =

Former Russian newspaper

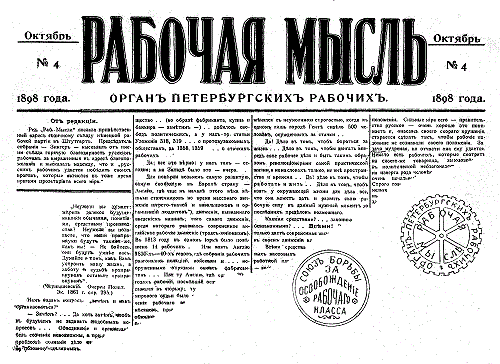
- Rabochaya Mysl, n. 4, october 1898
- Staff writers: Karl August Kok; Nikolaj Nikolaevich Lochov; Konstantin Michajlovich Tachtarev; Vladimir Pavlovich Ivanshin; Apollinariya Aleksandrovna Yakubova
- Founded: 1897
- Ceased publication: 1902
- Political alignment: Russian social democracy
- Language: Russian
- Country: Russian Empire

Rabochaya Mysl (Russian: Рабочая Mысль, Workers' Thought) was a Russian social-democrat newspaper and bearer of the Economist current.

Sixteen numbers were published in total. The first two numbers were released in Saint Petersburg in October and December 1897. In Berlin, the following nine issues were published, from 1898 to April 1901, followed by four other numbers released in Warsaw. The last number was published in December 1902, in Geneva.

The most influential editor was Konstantin Tachtarev (1871–1925). Other collaborators were Apollinariya Yakubova (1869–1917), Nikolai Lochov (1872–1948), Vladimir Ivanshin (1869–1904) and Karl August Kok.

== History ==
The founders of the newspaper were a group of Kolpino, an industrial suburb of Saint Petersburg, formed by the workers Jakov Andreev (1873–1927), the two Dulashev brothers, Efimov, Vlasov, Vetts, and by the employees Fel'dman, Vaneev and Ivanov. A group of workers from Obukhovo, a district of the capital, also joined the initiative. The workers of Kolpino had been formed politically at the school of some adherents of the Narodnaya Volya that resided there. After the newspaper's creation, they formed a circle called the Fight Organization, which some Obukhovo workers also joined.

Semenov, one of the latter, described a few years later the nature of the workers' organization: «The organization had to be purely manual, autonomous, independent of the intelligentsia" because they believed that the emancipation of the workers should be the exclusive task of the workers themselves, and the interference of intellectuals could "pollute the purity of the workers' movement".

Their propaganda and agitation did not touch on political but exclusively economic themes, simply because "we did not understand the political struggle and interpreted it in a trade-unionistic way". According to Semenov, they were unknowingly influenced from the so-called "legal Marxism" of Peter Struve and Mikhail Tugan-Baranovsky, which led them to Bernstein's revisionism and to the economism of Yekaterina Kuskova and Sergei Prokopovich.

On the characteristics of the circle and the newspaper, reported years after by Andreev:

Our newspaper looked like us. We organized ourselves spontaneously, independently of the social-democratic movement of the time. We had a practical approach without any theory [...] We were a confused group of militants jealous of their autonomy, and this confusion also surfaced in the first issue of Rabochaya Mysl; together with the revolutionary yearning, a petty-bourgeois approach was also nourished with regard to the means which, in our opinion, the workers had to use to defend their interests. Our life was disordered, our ideas were confused; all this was reflected in our articles.

— Jakov A. Andreev

An article in the first issue denounced the current weakness of the workers' movement, at the "mercy of tsarism" and unable to fight "against the despotism of capitalists and the government" until it was established in "a compact force, the conscious strength of autonomy of the working class". This force should have been achieved by means of a "workers' box", the only support that would have made the movement's activity possible.

At that point the worker could have assumed "the responsibility of his own destiny, taking it from the hands of his bosses". The columnist believed that politics always "economically follow the economy and that ultimately the limitations and constraints proper to politics are relaxed during this process", and from this consideration he deduced for the labor movement the primary need to conduct an economic struggle.

During 1896–1897, a long series of strikes forced the government to grant, on 16 June 1897, the law that lowered the duration of the working day to 11.5 hours. Commenting on those facts, the 7th issue of Rabochaya Mysl (July 1899) wrote that "a struggle of that kind, the struggle for the reduction of the working day, is a political struggle and constitutes an effective example of class consciousness".

Similar reductions in the politics of trade union struggles were theorized in other issues of the newspaper. In number 11 (April 1901) it was written to fight "above all for the freedom of strike, of association and assembly, for the individual liberties of speech and of press, since these freedoms will facilitate the increase of our wages and the reduction of the working day".

In order to conduct these battles, a political party was apparently not necessary, as it was not included among the means indicated in the 4th issue of the newspaper (October 1898) to "move the movement forward". Among the list of means were: strikes for wage increases and reductions in hours, «unions of secret workers and mutual aid», trade unions and workers' associations «structured according to the regulations of the Ministry of Interior», associations of consumers, educational and recreational centers, the union of fights for emancipation, journals and books «approved by the censorship» and even declarations printed in clandestine print shops.

Because of the criticism received by Vladimir Lenin and Georgi Plekhanov, in 1900, Konstantin Tachtarev proposed that Plekhanov take over the direction of the newspaper. Plekhanov subordinated his acceptance to the consent of Lenin, who declared himself against it. As he wrote to Apollinariya Yakubova, "the inevitable divergences, substantial and not secondary, with the positions of the editors of the Rabochaya Mysl would only bring confusion in the social-democratic movement".

Positions similar to those of Rabochaya Mysl were carried forward by the newspaper Rabocheye Delo (Russian: Рабочее Дело, The Workers' Cause), founded in Geneva in April 1899 as the organ of the Union of Russian Social Democrats Abroad. The latter newspaper ceased publication in February 1902, ten months before Rabochaya Mysl.

== Bibliography ==
- K. S. Semenov, Il primo anno dell'Organizzazione operaia pietroburghese, " Minuvšie Gody ", 12, 1908
- Jakov A. Andreev, Gli anni 1897 e 1898 a Kolpino, " Proletarskaja Revoljucija ", 2, 1923
- Vladimir Ivanovich Nevskij, Storia del Partito bolscevico, dalle origini al 1917, Milano, Pantarei, 2008 ISBN 978-88-86591-21-8
