= Yekaterina Kuskova =

Russian politician and journalist (1869–1958)

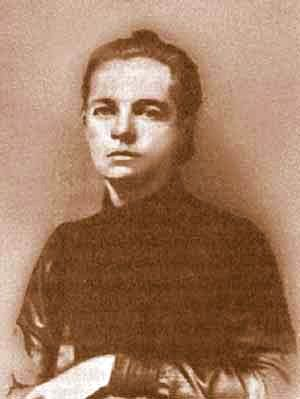
- Kuskova in the 1900s
- Born: November 23, 1869; Ufa, Russian Empire
- Died: December 22, 1958 (aged 89); Geneva, Switzerland

Yekaterina Dmitriyevna Kuskova (Russian: Екатери́на Дми́триевна Куско́ва; 1869–1958) was economist, journalist, and politician from the Russian Empire involved in founding both the Russian Social-Democratic Workers' Party (RSDRP) and the liberal Constitutional Democratic Party. She was an advocate of social reformism and opposed the Bolsheviks.

== Populism, Marxism and Revisionism ==
Kuskova was born in Ufa, in the Ufa Governorate of the Russian Empire. Her father was a school teacher. As a child, she moved to Samara and then to Saratov. In the 1880s, she became involved in the revolutionary movement. In 1890, she went to study in Moscow and participated in clandestine Narodnik circles. She was affiliated with the party of the 'People's Right' of Mark Natanson and met the future Socialist-Revolutionary leader Viktor Chernov. She was arrested in 1893 and exiled to Nizhni Novgorod (Gorki).

Then, she converted to Marxism and joined a group of Social-Democratic exiles that included her future husband, Sergei Prokopovich, whom she married in 1895. After being released, the couple moved to Germany in 1897. There, they met George Plekhanov and became active in the Union of Russian Social-Democrats Abroad. In 1898 they became members of the newly created RSDRP. However, by the late 1890s, Kuskova and Prokopovich had become increasingly doubtful about orthodox Marxism. Kuskova, in particular, became a proponent of Eduard Bernstein's Revisionism, which she championed in her famous and highly controversial 1899 article Credo, which was published without her knowledge by Vladimir Lenin.

Kuskova believed that the orthodox Marxist theory of the inevitable collapse of capitalism was wrong, that the development of capitalism in Russia was beneficial, and that capitalism could develop into socialism using gradual reform. She argued that the formation of the RSDRP was an "intellectual fiction", and explicitly called for a "democratic Marxism", which should transform its ambition to seize power into "an aspiration for transforming contemporary society in a democratic direction". These views were labeled 'Economism' by her critics (a somewhat vague term the orthodox Marxists applied to a number of different heresies, from revolutionary syndicalism to revisionism). These critics included George Plekhanov, Pavel Axelrod, V.I. Lenin, and many others. In the course of the controversy, Kuskova was expelled from the RSDRP. Her husband left the party as well. The Economism controversy also attracted attention from Western European socialists and became part of the larger battle between reformists and revolutionaries that raged in the late nineteenth century.

== Liberalism, reformism, and the Russian Revolutions ==
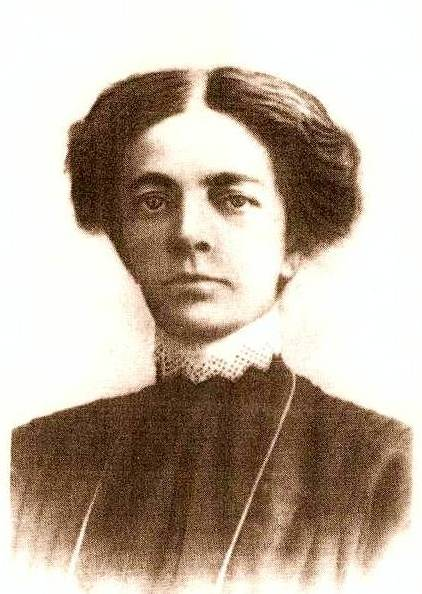
E.D. Kuskova

In 1904, Kuskova and Prokopovich became founding members of the liberal Union of Liberation, subsequently renamed the Constitutional-Democratic Party (KDP). The party demanded democratic political reforms and modest social reforms to benefit the working class. It united a number of former Marxists, notably P.B. Struve (who had written the RSDRP's first programme), and the philosophers N.A. Berdyaev and S.L. Frank, with a number of former Narodniks, such as A.V. Peshekhonov, N.F. Annensky and V.A. Myakotin, and with national liberals like P.N. Miliukov who had no socialist background at all. For some time, the ex-Marxists in the KDP maintained contact with the German Social Democrats and insisted that they were still socialists, but that Russia was not ripe for socialism and must first have a capitalist democracy.

Kuskova was one of the founders and editors of the journal Nasha Zhizn (Our Life), which became the official organ of the KDP. She became associated with Father Gapon, an Orthodox priest and social reformer who led the unarmed demonstration on Bloody Sunday, January 9, 1905 (OS), that sparked the Revolution of 1905. Because of her association with Gapon, Kuskova was briefly arrested. Upon her release, she helped organise the Union of Unions, one of the principal foci of liberal opposition to the régime. She was briefly a member of the Central Committee of the KDP, but soon resigned and left the KDP, because she disagreed with the conservative direction of its leader, Miliukov. In the 1910s Kuskova devoted herself to journalism, founding, editing, and contributing to several journals, such as Tovarich (Comrade) and Bez Zaglaviia (Without Title), which was closed down by the authorities. She contributed to Russkie Vedomosti (The Russian Gazette) as well. She advocated a reformist socialism, to the left of the KDP but incompatible with the Marxist orthodoxy of the RSDRP. Although she never attempted to rejoin the RSDRP, she maintained friendly relations with some of the Mensheviks, particularly the so-called 'Liquidators' who, in the 1910s, wanted to dissolve the illegal underground apparatus of the RSDRP and concentrate on legal work in trade unions and co-operatives. (Unions had been legalised in 1906.) Before the war, Kuskova was involved in the co-operative movement, in Freemasonry and in the struggle for women's rights. She was an early advocate of feminism in Russia. She was an active member of the irregular freemasonic lodge, the Grand Orient of Russia’s Peoples.

In 1914, Kuskova adopted a Defencist position. In 1917 she welcomed the February Revolution and supported the Provisional Government, which her husband at joined as Minister of Trade and Energy and then as Minister of Food. Kuskova launched the democratic socialist journal Vlasti Naroda (The People's Power), which united Defencist socialists from a variety of parties, including right-wing Mensheviks like Aleksandr Potresov, veteran Narodniks like Nikolai Tchaikovsky and right-wing SRs like Boris Savinkov. She was fiercely critical of the Bolsheviks' anti-war agitation but also condemned the Constitutional Democrats for their involvement in the Kornilov Affair.

She participated in the Democratic Conference and the Pre-Parliament, and she stood as a candidate for election to the Constituent Assembly. She opposed the Bolsheviks' October Revolution and denounced the Bolsheviks' suppression of the Constituent Assembly, but she did not support armed counter-revolution. She remained in Russia throughout the Civil War. In 1921, at the height of the famine that followed the civil war, Kuskova, Prokopovich and some of their old associates volunteered for the Public Committee for Famine Relief. Their efforts were tolerated as long as the situation was dire, but the Soviet government eventually accused the Committee of engaging in anti-Soviet propaganda. In November 1921 they were arrested and exiled to Vologda. In 1922, Kuskova and her husband were expelled from Soviet Russia, along with a number of other prominent liberals and social reformists.

== Final exile ==
Kuskova and Prokopovich first settled in Berlin, where they were active in various organisations supporting Russian political prisoners and published a number of anti-Bolshevik journals. In 1924 they moved to Prague, where Kuskova participated in forming the 'Republican Democratic Association with a number of exiled liberals. During the NEP Kuskova had hopes that the Soviet Union would reform itself and that she might one day be able to return, but these hopes were sharply criticised by old allies like Struve. In 1939, when Hitler invaded Prague, the couple moved to Geneva. Kuskova continued to write on economics, history and political matters. During the Second World War she again hoped that, once fascism was defeated, the Soviet Union, allied with the West, would permit democratic exiles to return. Again she was disappointed. She died in Geneva on December 22, 1958.

== Sources ==
- Shukman, H. (ed.), The Blackwell Encyclopedia of the Russian Revolution. Oxford: Blackwell, 1988.
- The Great Soviet Encyclopedia. Moscow, 1979. (This is a hostile source.)
- Bisha, R., Russian women, 1698–1917: Experience and Expression. An Anthology of Sources. Bloomington: Indiana UP, 2002, pp. 184 ff.
- Correspondence with B. Souvarine at the Hoover Institution Archives, Stanford University, Stanford, California.
- Kuskova, E.D., Der internationale Handelsmarkenerfolg aus Konsumentensicht Analyse am Beispiel von Deutschland und Russland. Südwestdeutscher Verlag für Hochschulschriften, 2009.
