= Arkady Gornfeld =

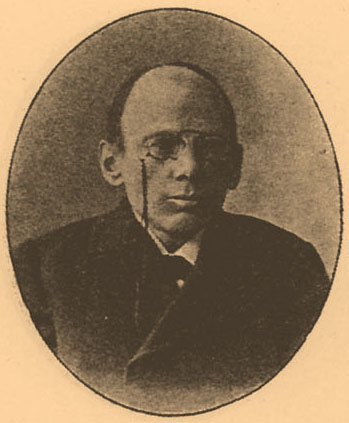
- Born: 30 August [O.S. 18 August] 1867; Sevastopol, Taurida Governorate, Russian Empire
- Died: 25 March 1941 (aged 73); Leningrad, USSR
- Occupations: translator, literary critic, essayist
- Writing career
- Literary movement: “Reasonable Maverick"

Arkady Georgievich Gornfeld (Russian: Арка́дий Гео́ргиевич Го́рнфельд, IPA: [ɐrˈkadʲɪj ɡʲɪˈorɡʲɪ(j)ɪvʲɪdʑ ˈɡornʲfʲɪlʲt]; 30 August [O.S. 18 August] 1867 – 25 March 1941) was a prominent Russian essayist, literary critic and translator, best known for a feud with dissident poet Osip Mandelstam.

== Life and work ==
Arkady G. Gornfeld was born in 1867 in Sevastopol, the son of a notary. After his childhood in Ukraine, he went on to study philology, literature and psychology at Kharkov University (Ukraine) and Berlin University. He then embarked on a career writing for various publications, including Russkoye Bogatstvo (Russian Wealth).

His books dealt with foreign and Russian literature, as well as music. In his assessment of Jewish-Russian literature, he argued that the shtetl writings so far had failed to reach the greatness of Tolstoy. He contributed to the Jewish Encyclopedia, which lists him as a counselor of law.

== Wrath of Lenin ==
In 1922, Lenin personally listed Gornfeld among a list of thinkers harmful to the Revolution, writing to his successor:

Comrade Stalin!

On the matter of deporting the Mensheviks, Popular Socialists, Kadets and the like from Russia, I would like to ask several questions in view of the fact that this operation, initiated before my leave, has not been completed to this day.

[...] Peshekhonov, Miakotin, Gorenfeld? [...] I think all of them should be deported. They are more harmful than any SR [moderate socialist], because more cunning.

But unlike 120 other intellectuals deported that summer under Lenin's orders, Gornfeld remained in the Soviet Union.

== Osip Mandelstam Feud ==
In 1916, Gornfeld published a translation of Till Eulenspiegel, a retelling of German fables by Charles De Coster. Several years later, the publisher Land and Factory assigned the dissident poet Osip Mandelstam the task of revising it.

A misunderstanding began when the publishing house, Land and Factory, failed to let Gornfeld know about the 1928 revision. Then, in a serious printing error, Gornfeld's name was left off the title page. Instead, Mandelstam's name was on Gornfeld's work.

The publishing house issued an apology. But Gornfeld had already concluded that Mandelstam purposely stole his work. He attacked the poet in a letter to the Red Evening Gazette, likening Mandelstam to a house guest who steals a fur coat from a hangar.

Mandelstam struck back, both at Gornfeld and the “trashy” translation industry, in his book The Fourth Prose, calling Gornfeld a sickly version of Georges Charles de Heeckeren d’Anthès, the killer of his fellow poet, Pushkin.

This paralytic d’Anthés, this uncle Monia from the Basseinaia Street . . . Uncle Gornfel'd, why did you decide to complain in the Birzhevka, that is, The Red Evening Gazette, in the Soviet year of 1929? You would have done better to weep in the clean Jewish literary waistcoat of Mr. Propper. You would have done better to relate your misfortune to the banker with sciatic nerve, kugel, and the tallith.

A bitter blow to Mandelstam's business and reputation, the “Eulenspiegel Affair” led Mandelstam to restyle himself an outlaw poet, rejected and persecuted by a corrupt literary establishment.

== Bibliography ==
«Forgotten writer "(Kushchevskaya, 1895);

"Criticism and lyricism" (1897);

"I. I. Dityatin" (1896, 2);

"Paul-Louis Courier" (1895);

"The torments of the Word" ("Collection of Russian Wealth", 1899);

"Memory of Herzen" (1900);

"Theory and practice of the study of literature" (1901);

"Russian women Nekrasov in a new light" (1904);

"Experimental Art" (1904);

"The Future of Art" (1908);

"S. Aksakov"

"Literature and heroism, etc."

"Books and People" (1908);

"In the West" (1910);

"On the interpretation of artistic works" (1912);

"On the Russian writers", v. 1 (1912);
