= Lokhoff =

Lokhoff is a surname. Notable people with the surname include:

- Nicolas Lokhoff (1872–1948), Russian painter-copyist and restorer
- Ton Lokhoff (born 1959), Dutch footballer and manager
