= Knipovich =

Knipovich (Russian: Книпович) is a Russian surname. Notable people with the surname include:

- Yevgeniya Knipovich (1898-1988), Soviet literary scholar and critic
- Lydia Knipovich (1857–1920), Russian-Finnish revolutionary
- Nikolai Knipovich (1862–1939), Russian marine zoologist
