= Sergei Prokopovich =

Russian economist, sociologist and politician

Sergei Nikolaevich Prokopovich (Russian: Серге́й Николаевич Прокопович; 1871–1955) was a Russian economist, sociologist, Revisionist Social-Democrat and later a liberal politician.

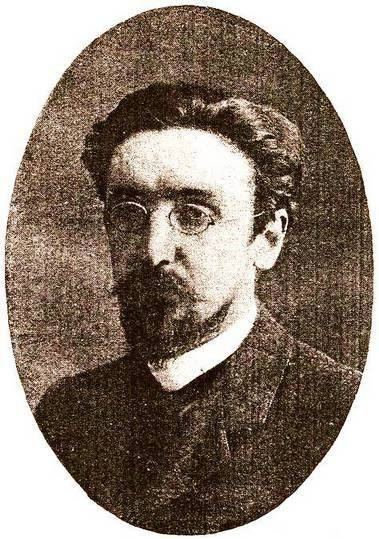
S.N. Prokopovich

== Life ==
Prokopovich was born into a noble family in Tsarskoe Selo in 1871. In the early 1890s he became involved in radical student politics and was at first attracted to populist ('narodnik') ideas, but by 1894 he had embraced Marxism. In 1895 he went to study in Western Europe, graduating from the University of Brussels in 1899. During that period Prokopovich joined the 'Union of Russian Social-Democrats Abroad', one of the groups from which the Russian Social-Democratic Workers' Party (RSDRP) emerged. Under the influence of the German Revisionist Social-Democrat Eduard Bernstein, the British Fabians, French Possibilism and the emerging Russian trade union movement, Prokopovich and his wife, E.D. Kuskova (1869–1958), moved away from 'orthodox' Marxism toward a position their critics (Georgi Plekhanov, Vladimir Lenin and others) criticised as 'Economism'. In fact, these critics used the term 'Economism' rather loosely and also applied it to revolutionary syndicalist currents within the Social-Democratic party. Peshekhonov's thesis was basically that, since the coming revolution would (according to 'orthodox' Marxism) be 'bourgeois-democratic, the struggle for political emancipation should be led by, and largely left to, the bourgeoisie, while the Russian working class should concentrate on organising itself economically and winning social and economic improvements.

The 'Economist' controversy in Russian Social-Democracy was quite vehement and in some ways foreshadowed the later split between Bolsheviks and Mensheviks (not all Mensheviks were former 'Economists', but many were). The dispute can also be seen as part of the controversy over Revisionism and Possibilism which raged in European Marxist parties around the turn of the century.

By 1899 Prokopovich and Kuskova had left the RSDRP. They became involved in organising Russia's nascent liberal movement. In 1904 they helped found the 'Union of Liberation' from which the Constitutional-Democratic Party (KDP) sprang, together with other former Marxists like P.B. Struve and 'Legal Populists' like A.V. Peshekhonov. From different points of departure, all had arrived at the conclusion that, in Russia's present state of history, the bourgeoisie should take the lead in the political struggle against tsarism. Prokopovich nevertheless continued to sympathize with the labour movement and, beginning in 1900, published several noteworthy studies on the labour movements of Russia and Western Europe. In 1901 he moved to Baku, where he immersed himself into organizing strikes among the Baku oil workers. It was here that he wrote the first part of his political novella Rodina i Mat ("Fatherland and Mother"), which was set in an idealized Russian past, in which peasants and workers held power. He was briefly arrested in 1903, but was released soon thereafter.

In 1904 Prokopovich co-founded the liberal newspaper Our Life (Nasha zhizň). During the Revolution of 1905 he was briefly arrested. He helped organise the 'Union of Unions' and briefly served on the central committee of the KDP. However, he was dissatisfied by the Great Russian national chauvinism of such colleagues as Pavel Miliukov, the romantic populism of people like Annensky, Peshekhonov and Miakotin and the party's scant interest in labour issues. He remained without party affiliation. During the next few years he wrote some novels and copious articles on economic and sociological topics. He and Kuskova also edited the journal Bez zaglaviia. In addition, they were active in the co-operative movement. During the First World War Prokopovich was a 'Defencist'.

In 1917 Prokopovich and Kuskova welcomed the February Revolution and re-joined the Menshevik Social-Democratic party. Prokopovich held several ministerial portfolios in the Alexander Kerensky government. He was an active member of the irregular freemasonic lodge, the Grand Orient of Russia’s Peoples. He opposed the October Revolution and briefly tried to lead an anti-Bolshevik government in Moscow. This was quickly dispersed. In 1921, Prokopovich devoted himself to famine relief. The contacts to American and Western European aid agencies he forged in this capacity were later held against him, and in 1922 he was expelled from the Soviet Union. In exile he published the journals, including Ekonomicheskii sbornik (Economic Review) and Russkii ekonomicheskii sbornik (Russian Economic Review). In 1939, as the Second World War broke out, Prokopovich and Kuskova moved to Switzerland, where he died in Geneve in 1955.

== Works ==
- K rabochemu voprosu v Rossii. St. Petersburg, 1905.
- Biudzhety peterburgskikh rabochikh. St. Petersburg, 1909.
- Agrarnyi krizis i meropriiatiiapravitel’stva. Moscow, 1912.
- Kooperativnoe dvizhenie v Rossii: Ego teoriia ipraktika, 2nd ed. Moscow, 1918.
