= Vulgar Marxism =

Pejorative term for interpretations of Marxism

Vulgar Marxism is a pejorative label used since the early 20th century to criticize interpretations of Marxism that oversimplify its core tenets. Critics use the term to refer to the belief that the economic base of society determines its superstructure in a mechanistic, one-sided way, and to a fatalistic interpretation of historical materialism as an automatic process independent of conscious human action. The term is most closely associated with the dominant theoretical positions of the Second International, particularly the "orthodox" Marxism of Karl Kautsky.

According to philosopher Richard Hudelson, the core of "vulgar Marxism" as it developed in the Second International was the conception of Marxism as a social science largely independent of philosophy. Its proponents sought to separate the scientific content of Marx's theories of capitalism and history from philosophical ontology or Hegelian dialectics. This approach was seen as compatible with the prevailing academic philosophies of the time, such as Neo-Kantianism and positivism. Historian of political thought David McLellan notes that this tendency towards simplification and rigidity transformed Marxism into a "dogmatic ideology" for mass movements, providing the "certainty of final victory" but entailing a growing distance from the nuances of Marx's original thought.

Following the political collapse of the Second International with the outbreak of World War I, this "vulgar Marxist" tradition came under heavy criticism from two new, influential currents of Marxist thought: Marxism–Leninism and Western Marxism. Both Vladimir Lenin and humanists like Georg Lukács and Karl Korsch argued that this philosophical simplification was a "vulgarization" that led directly to the political failures of the International. They charged it with being undialectical, fatalistic, and regressing to a pre-Marxist form of mechanical materialism. After these critiques, "vulgar Marxism" was almost universally rejected and became a subject of primarily historical interest. Hudelson argues that a similar approach, which treats Marxism as an empirical social science independent of a distinct philosophical method, has re-emerged in the late 20th century in the form of analytical Marxism.

== Etymology and definition ==
The term "vulgar Marxism" is a pejorative used by its critics. Its usage emerged in the period immediately following World War I, as thinkers like Karl Korsch, Georg Lukács, and Vladimir Lenin sought to explain the theoretical and political failings of the Marxism of the Second International. Korsch specifically used the term to describe the theories of the Second International, arguing that they had "descended to the level of 'vulgar Marxism'" by separating the economic base from the consciousness of the working class. In his 1923 work Marxism and Philosophy, Korsch described this period as one in which the dominant currents of Marxism were narrowed to the status of a positive social science, devoid of its original philosophical content:

Bourgeois professors of philosophy reassured each other that Marxism had no philosophical content of its own—and thought they were saying something important against it. Orthodox Marxists also reassured each other that their Marxism by its very nature had nothing to do with philosophy—and thought they were saying something important in favour of it. There was a third trend. ... It consisted of those "philosophizing socialists" of various kinds who saw their task as that of "supplementing" the Marxist system with ideas from Kulturphilosophie or with notions from Kant, Dietzgen or Mach, or other philosophies. Yet precisely because they thought that the Marxist system needed philosophical supplements, they made it quite clear that in their eyes too Marxism in itself lacked philosophical content.

— Karl Korsch, Marxism and Philosophy (1923)

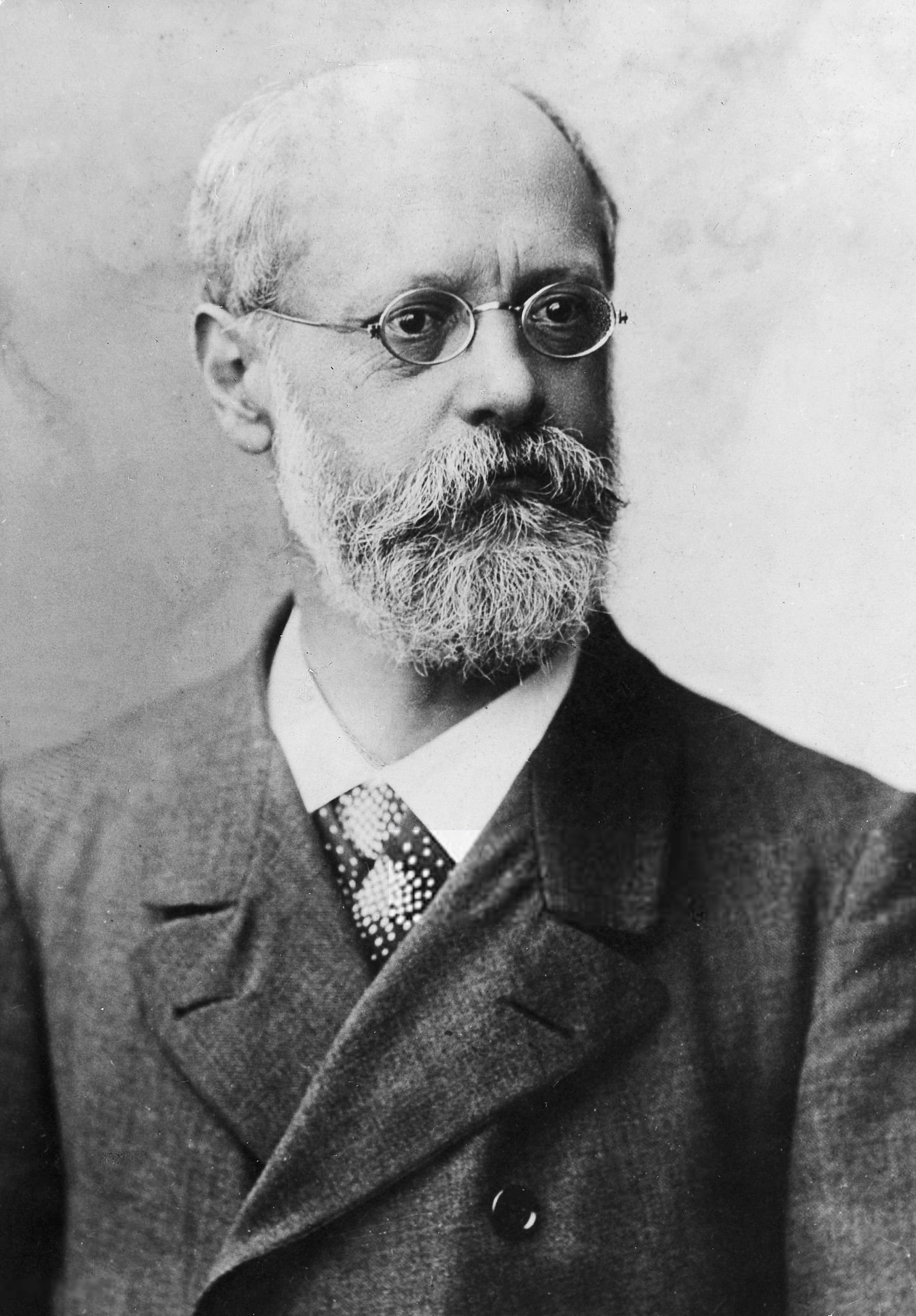
Karl Kautsky, the leading theorist of orthodox Marxism within the Second International. His view of Marxism as a social science independent of philosophy is considered a primary example of what critics later termed "vulgar Marxism".

Richard Hudelson identifies this shared view of Marxism as "social science, and not philosophy" as the common ground uniting the otherwise competing factions of the Second International, including the "orthodox" Marxism of Karl Kautsky, the revisionism of Eduard Bernstein, the Austro-Marxism of figures like Max Adler, and the empirio-critical Marxism of Alexander Bogdanov.

While the term targets the Second International, David McLellan suggests that the roots of this "vulgarization" can be traced to the later works of Friedrich Engels. Following Marx's death, Engels became the primary interpreter of Marxist theory. Influenced by the prestige of the natural sciences and Darwinism in the late 19th century, Engels sought to systematize Marxism into a "world view" rooted in a materialist conception of nature. In works such as Anti-Dühring, Engels applied dialectical laws to the physical universe (the "dialectics of nature"), a move which critics argue shifted Marxism from a theory of social praxis to a deterministic science of universal motion. This "scientific" systematization provided the intellectual foundation for the Second International's fatalistic belief in the inevitability of socialism.

Kevin B. Anderson traces this same tendency to Lenin's early works, which reflected a "positivist and scientistic" position with "basic elements common to orthodox Marxism at that time [which] Stalinism would vulgarise".

=== Core tenets ===
- Scientific socialism: The central tenet of vulgar Marxism was the understanding of Marx's primary contribution as a scientific theory of capitalism and history. Proponents saw Marx's work as "ordinary science," similar in nature and method to the theories of both the classical economists and the natural sciences. Kautsky, for example, viewed historical development as a "natural process" governed by laws independent of human will. On this view, the revolutionary nature of Marxist science was due not to a unique epistemology or philosophical method, but to the substantive implications of its scientific discoveries about the law-governed development of capitalist economies. Marxism was seen as a positive science capable of generating empirically testable explanations and predictions.
- Philosophical neutrality: In response to critiques of philosophical materialism from late 19th-century academic philosophy, theorists of the Second International tended to separate Marxism's scientific content from any particular philosophical foundation. While Kautsky defended dialectical materialism, he also held that Marxism's core scientific theories were compatible with other philosophical frameworks, such as positivism or Neo-Kantianism. This philosophical neutrality allowed various Marxist thinkers to attempt to ground Marx's social science in what they saw as more modern and defensible philosophical systems. The Austro-Marxists largely looked to Neo-Kantianism, while others, particularly in Russia, turned to the positivism of Ernst Mach. What united these different approaches was the conviction that the value of Marxism lay in its social science, which was seen as philosophically neutral.
- Economic determinism: Vulgar Marxism is often criticized for its adherence to a rigid economic determinism, sometimes referred to as "economism." However, Hudelson argues that this is a "straw man" characterization. The orthodox Marxists of the Second International, such as Kautsky and Georgi Plekhanov, did not deny the causal efficacy of ideas, morals, or politics in history. Rather, they held a more sophisticated "interactionist" version of economic determinism, in which ideas function as necessary links in the causal chain of historical development but are themselves understood as effects of economic causes. In this view, ideas are historically efficacious but also historically determined. Nevertheless, critics like Bernstein argued that this orthodoxy relied too heavily on the "inevitable collapse" of capitalism driven by purely economic forces, a view Kautsky maintained by arguing that economic systems function like natural organisms.

== Critiques ==
The political collapse of the Second International, which failed to prevent the outbreak of World War I when its member parties abandoned proletarian internationalism in favor of supporting their respective national governments, prompted a profound re-examination of its theoretical foundations. Critics from both the nascent Marxist–Leninist and Western Marxist traditions argued that this political disaster was the direct consequence of the philosophical errors of "vulgar Marxism".

=== Marxist–Leninist critique ===
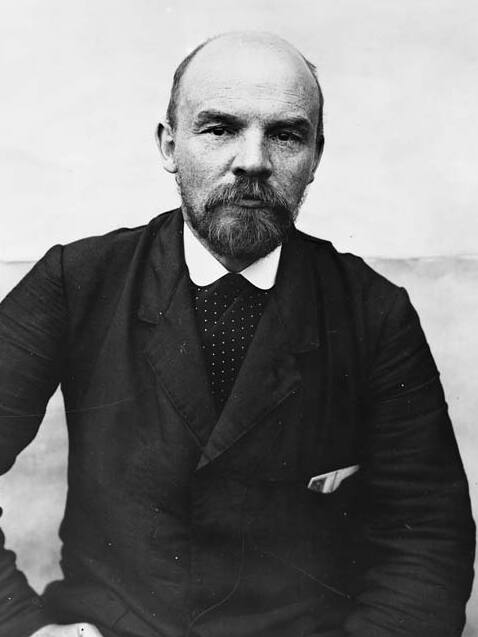
Vladimir Lenin

Vladimir Lenin argued that the Marxism of the Second International had been corrupted by bourgeois philosophy, particularly the positivism and Neo-Kantianism that were used to challenge philosophical materialism. In Materialism and Empirio-criticism (1909), he contended that these philosophical trends were merely warmed-over versions of subjective idealism that were incompatible with scientific realism. Lenin emphasized the importance of "partisan" philosophy, arguing that any concession to idealism in philosophy would inevitably lead to errors in political practice.

Following his study of Hegel in 1914, Lenin came to believe that the Second International's evolutionism was a betrayal of the "leaps" and "contradictions" inherent in true dialectical thought. A central aspect of Lenin's critique was the charge that vulgar Marxism was fundamentally "undialectical". In his critique of Kautsky's response to the Bolshevik Revolution, Lenin attributed Kautsky's political rigidity and inability to grasp the necessity of revolutionary tactics to an overly pedantic and rigid conception of historical laws, failing to understand what was "decisive in Marxism, namely, its revolutionary dialectics". This undialectical outlook, Lenin argued, abandoned the revolutionary potential of Marxism in favor of a gradualist evolutionism. For Leninists, this represented a regression to a pre-Marxist, "metaphysical" materialism that failed to grasp the dialectical nature of reality and was therefore incapable of guiding revolutionary political practice. Anderson sees in Lenin's studies of Hegel an implicit self-criticism of his earlier works like Materialism and Empirio-criticism.

=== Western Marxist critique ===
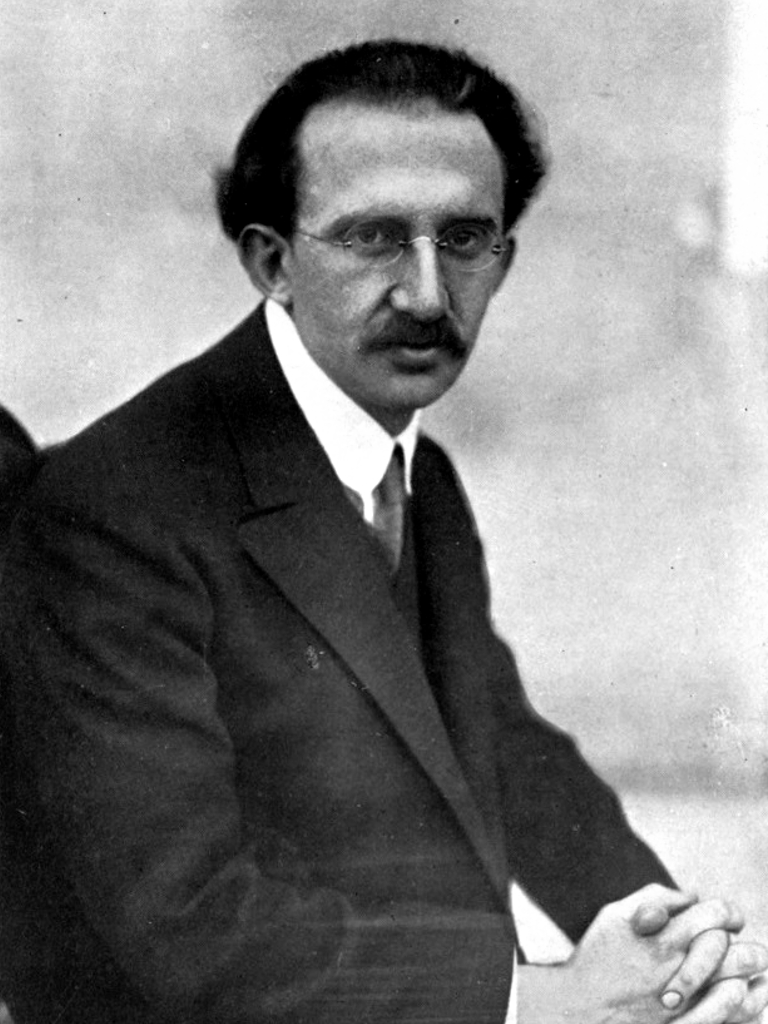
Georg Lukács

The Western (or humanistic) Marxist critique, first articulated in the early 1920s by Georg Lukács in History and Class Consciousness and Karl Korsch in Marxism and Philosophy (both 1923), also traced the political failure of the Second International to its philosophical deficiencies. Like Lenin, the humanists located the error in a regression from Hegelian dialectics, but their understanding of this error differed sharply from the Leninist view.

Lukács argued that the principal error of vulgar Marxism was its treatment of the historical process as an "objectivized" phenomenon governed by laws analogous to those of the natural sciences. He criticized the "scientism" of the Second International, noting that Engels' attempt to apply dialectics to nature resulted in a rigid interaction between subject and object that ignored the "vital interaction" of human consciousness. This, he claimed, was an "alienated form of consciousness" that misperceived the social world—a product of free human creation—as an independent reality constraining human freedom. Karl Korsch explicitly targeted the "vulgar-Marxism" of theorists like Rudolf Hilferding, arguing that their approach robbed Marxism of its "philosophical element" by treating it as a system of pure science devoid of revolutionary content. For Korsch, this theoretical abstraction led to a practical reformism that sought to modify capitalism rather than overthrow it.

The economic determinism of the Second International was seen as a form of fatalism that neglected the "subjective side" of history and the role of conscious human action (praxis). According to this critique, vulgar Marxism failed to grasp that what is essential to Marxism is its method, which comprehends society as a totality of interdependent parts, rather than any specific scientific claim. Later Western Marxists continued this line of attack; Jean-Paul Sartre, for example, criticized the deterministic Marxism of the French Communist Party as "lazy Marxism" for using dialectics as a dogma to force history into preconceived molds rather than exploring the specific realities of human experience.

== Later re-evaluation ==
Following the critiques from Marxist–Leninism and Western Marxism, the "scientific socialism" of the Second International was nearly universally rejected within Marxist philosophy. The literary critic Robert C. Tucker, writing in 1961, observed that "the old assumption that 'scientific socialism' is a scientific system of thought has tended more and more to give way to the notion that it is in essence a moralistic or religious system."

Richard Hudelson argues that a significant revival of interest in "scientific socialism" began in the late 1970s with the rise of analytical Marxism in English-language philosophy. He contends that analytical Marxism shares many core features with the Marxism of the Second International. Like its predecessor, analytical Marxism conceives of Marxism as a social science, is keen on employing contemporary methods from non-Marxist ("bourgeois") science and philosophy (such as rational choice theory), and is critical of Hegelian dialectics as "speculative metaphysics at its worst". It rejects the claim that Marxist social theory rests on a methodological foundation distinct from that of other sciences.

== See also ==
- Class reductionism – Political epithet
- Marxian economics – School of economic thought
- Naïve realism – Idea that the senses provide us with direct awareness of objects as they really are
- Vulgarity – Quality of being common, coarse, or unrefined
