= Popular Socialists (Russia) =

Labourist Popular-Socialist Party Трудовая народно-социалистическая партия
- Leader: Alexey Peshekhonov; Nikolai Annensky; Venedikt Miakotin
- Founded: 1906
- Dissolved: 1918
- Split from: Socialist Revolutionary Party
- Newspaper: Народное слово
- Ideology: Neo-Narodnichestvo; Popular socialism Agrarian socialism Democratic Socialism; Reformism
- Political position: Centre-left

Party flag

The Popular Socialist Party (Russian: Трудовая народно-социалистическая партия, romanized: Trudovaya Narodno-Sotsialisticheskaya Partiya, lit. 'Labourist Popular-Socialist Party') emerged in Russia in the early twentieth century.

== History ==
The roots of the Popular Socialist Party (NSP) lay in the 'Legal Populist' movement of the 1890s, and its founders looked upon N.K. Mikhailovsky and Alexander Herzen as ideological forerunners. The NSP was founded in 1906, by a number of dissidents from the Socialist-Revolutionary Party (SRs). They objected to the PSR's adoption of political terrorism and wanted to 'nationalize' the land (i.e., turn it over to the state), rather than 'socialize' it (i.e., make it common property of the peasantry), as the PSR proposed.

The Popular Socialists also wanted to indemnify landowners; the PSR did not. Furthermore, the Popular Socialists deplored the influence of Marxism on the leading ideologues of the PSR, such as V.M. Chernov. Leading members of the NSP were N.F. Annensky (1843–1912), V.A. Miakotin (1867–1937) and A.V. Peshekhonov (1867–1933). The latter was minister of agriculture in the Provisional Government of A.F. Kerensky during the Russian Revolution of 1917.

The Popular Socialists collaborated closely with the Trudoviks (Labour Group), Kerensky's party in the State Duma. After the February Revolution of 1917, the Popular Socialist Party merged with the Trudoviks and actively supported the Provisional Government, in which it was represented.

The Popular Socialists opposed the October Revolution. The party was dissolved during the Russian Civil War of 1918–1922.

The party's Russian name is sometimes translated as 'National Socialist Party', but this is misleading, since that label is usually associated with Hitler's National Socialist German Workers' Party (NSDAP). The Russian NSP was not antisemitic and advocated democracy and gradual reform.
