= Class reductionism =

Political epithet

Class reductionism is an epithet used to describe social theories that emphasize the role of the exploitation of labour along the lines of social classes in creating societal inequality, over all other social divisions and forms of oppression, such as racism or sexism. It is also used to describe political policies and strategies that prioritize broad economic reform to the exclusion of addressing issues facing specific minorities. The term is most commonly used in the context of Marxist theory and critiques thereof.

== Description ==
Class reductionism is disparagingly used to describe theoretical and political frameworks that prioritize the significance of class relations over all other societal hierarchies. The term is used to criticize theories, policies or strategies that neglect to directly address racism, sexism or other social oppressions in favor of broad economic policies that are targeted at addressing the working class as a whole. Critics of class reductionism claim that this approach sidelines people, particularly working-class people, who want to take up the fight against other oppressions more directly, and fragments political movements on the Left as a consequence. Class reductionism has been described as being opposed to identity politics and postmodernism. The term has also been used to describe Marxist theory as a whole.

Adolph Reed claims that class reductionism is a "myth", accusing those who use the term of instead engaging in "race reductionism".

== See also ==
- Economism
- Intersectionality
- Old Left
- Producerism
- Reductionism
- Welfare chauvinism
- Vulgar Marxism
