= Economism =

Ideology; term in Marxist discourse

Economism in Marxist usage means reducing the workers' movement to immediate economic demands—wages, hours, workplace conditions, trade-union bargaining—and treating broader political struggle for independent class power (e.g. a political party) as secondary, derivative, or unnecessary.

For Marx and Engels, this is an error because class struggle is not merely workplace bargaining or economic reforms: "every class struggle is a political struggle," and the proletariat's organization as a class becomes organization "into a political party."

In particular, "economism" was a movement in early Russian Social Democratic Labour Party whose position was that the workers' struggle must be only economical and not political.

Before World War I, the dominant ideological current within the socialist movement represented by the Second International was Orthodox Marxism, which shares many similarities with Economism, and is most closely associated with Karl Kautsky. The collapse of socialist international unity in 1914 diminished Kautsky's authority and created the conditions in which Lenin's interpretation of Marxism gained prominence.

== In Marxist analysis ==
=== Lenin ===
The term economism was described by Lenin as the tendency to tail spontaneous trade-union consciousness instead of raising workers to revolutionary socialist politics. In What Is To Be Done?, he says workers left to spontaneity develop "trade union consciousness"—combining in unions, fighting employers, and seeking labor legislation—while Communists must combat the reduction of the movement to that level.

In his criticism of economism, Lenin's view was that the political figure of the worker could not necessarily be inferred from the worker's social position. Under capitalism, the worker's labor power is commodified and sold in exchange for wages. While negotiating the sale of labor power is necessary for survival under capitalism, Lenin argued that participating in that negotiation did not guarantee a worker's political existence and in fact obscured the underlying political stakes.

Lenin used the term in his attacks on a trend in the early Russian Social Democratic Labour Party around the newspaper Rabochaya Mysl. Among the representatives of Russian economicism were Nikolai Lochoff, Yekaterina Kuskova, Alexander Martynov, Sergei Prokopovich, Konstantin Takhtarev and others.

=== Cultural Revolution ===
The charge of economism is frequently brought against revisionists by anti-revisionists when economics, instead of politics, is placed in command of society; and when primacy of the development of the productive forces is held over concerns for the nature and relations surrounding those productive forces.

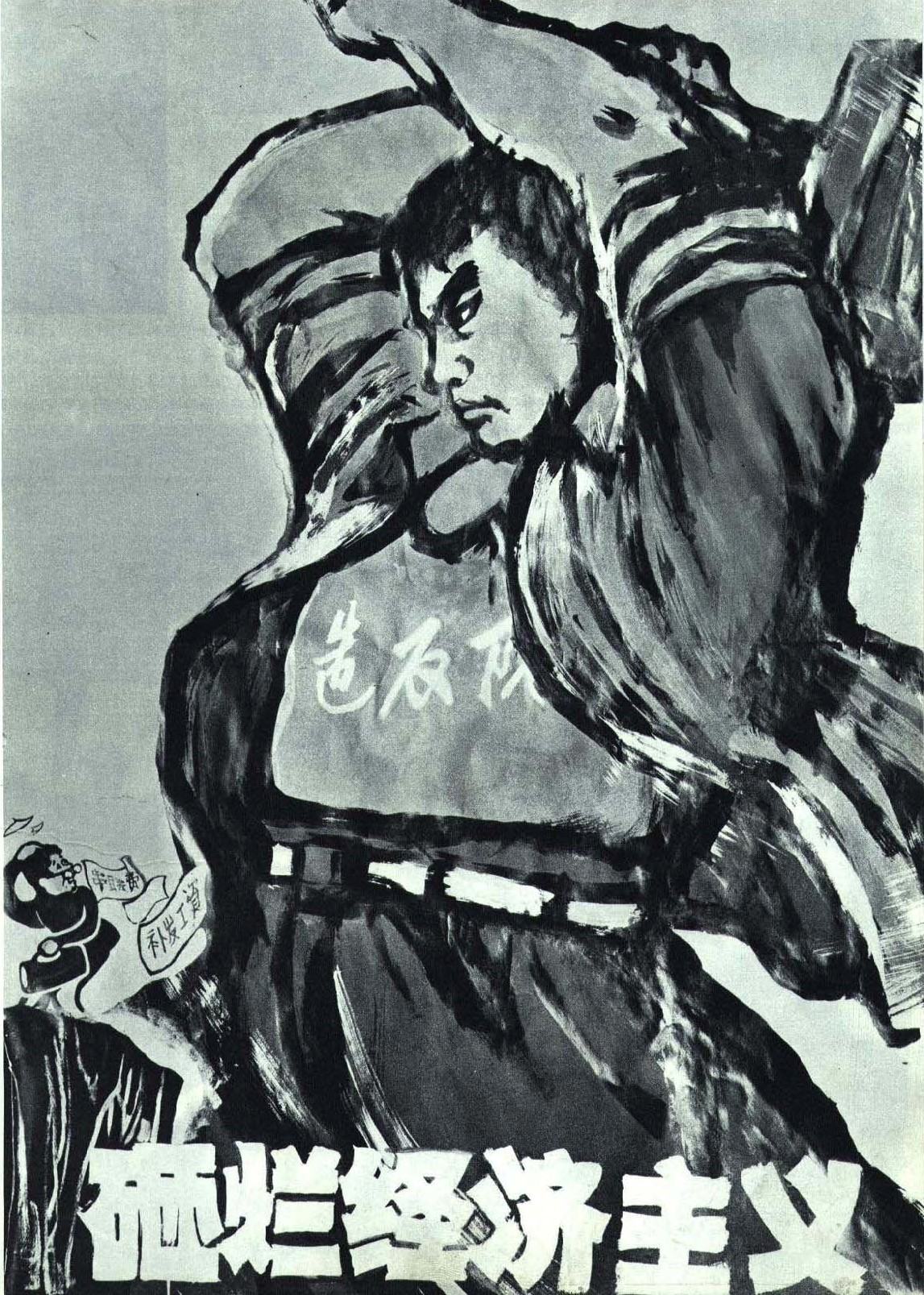
"Smashing Economism", 1967 Chinese propaganda poster

Economism became a familiar term in Chinese political discourse only during the Cultural Revolution. Mao Zedong criticized the material incentives of economism, arguing that production must be led by revolutionary politics and to reward productivity with money promoted the wrong values and was inconsistent with making factories a bastion of proletarian politics.

In particular, economism became the most important issue during the Shanghai People's commune. Although many historical narratives of the Cultural Revolution have described economism as an effort on the part of the Chinese Communist Party leadership to bribe workers into political passivity, more recent scholarship argues that those narratives are only "partially correct, at best." Academic Yiching Wu argues, for example, that although local bureaucrats were in fact willing to make economistic concessions to workers, they had no control over the eruption of worker grievances and demands. Instead, economistic demands during this period were rooted in worker's actual conditions and driven by factors including the deterioration of work conditions during the state-driven economic accumulation of the late 1950s, the weakness of Chinese trade unions, and the collapse of the economy during the Great Leap Forward.

=== Others ===
Robert M. Young used the term as a synonym to vulgar Marxism, which he defined as "the most orthodox [position in Marxism which] provides one-to-one correlations between the socio-economic base and the intellectual superstructure".

== Other uses ==
The term is often used to criticize economics as an ideology in which supply and demand are the only important factors in decisions and outstrip or permit ignoring all other factors. It is believed to be a side effect of neoclassical economics and blind faith in an "invisible hand" or laissez-faire means of making decisions, extended far beyond controlled and regulated markets and used to make political and military decisions. Conventional ethics would play no role in decisions under pure economism, except insofar as supply would be withheld, demand curtailed, by moral choices of individuals. Thus, critics of economism insist on political and other cultural dimensions in society.

Old Right social critic Albert Jay Nock used the term more broadly, denoting a moral and social philosophy "which interprets the whole sum of human life in terms of the production, acquisition, and distribution of wealth", adding: "I have sometimes thought that here may be the rock on which Western civilization will finally shatter itself. Economism can build a society which is rich, prosperous, powerful, even one which has a reasonably wide diffusion of material well-being. It can not build one which is lovely, one which has savor and depth, and which exercises the irresistible power of attraction that loveliness wields. Perhaps by the time economism has run its course the society it has built may be tired of itself, bored of its own hideousness, and may despairingly consent to annihilation, aware that it is too ugly to be let live any longer."

== See also ==
- Class reductionism
- Reformism
- Revisionism (Marxism)
- Right opposition
- Economic determinism
- Gross national happiness
- Vulgar Marxism – Pejorative term for interpretations of Marxism
- Kautskyism

== Bibliography ==
- John Ralston Saul (2005). The Collapse of Globalism.
- Richard Norgaard (2015). "The Church of Economism and Its Discontents". In Great Transition Initiative.
