= 3724 Annenskij =

Asteroid

Discovery
- Discovered by: L. Zhuravleva
- Discovery site: Crimean Astrophysical Obs.
- Discovery date: 23 December 1979

Designations
- Named after: Innokenty Annensky (Russian poet)
- Alternative designations: 1979 YN_{8} · 1933 XB; 1955 QQ · 1965 YM; 1969 RF_{2} · 1974 VM_{2} 1980 AE · 1985 DF_{1}
- Minor planet category: main-belt · (middle); Gefion

Orbital characteristics
- Epoch 23 March 2018 (JD 2458200.5)
- Uncertainty parameter 0
- Observation arc: 84.28 yr (30,783 d)
- Aphelion: 3.2198 AU
- Perihelion: 2.3123 AU
- Semi-major axis: 2.7660 AU
- Eccentricity: 0.1640
- Orbital period (sidereal): 4.60 yr (1,680 d)
- Mean anomaly: 176.15°
- Mean motion: 0° 12^{m} 51.48^{s} / day
- Inclination: 7.7351°
- Longitude of ascending node: 269.19°
- Argument of perihelion: 117.85°

Physical characteristics
- Mean diameter: 12.09±2.86 km 13.55±0.37 km 13.74±0.47 km 14.15±1.3 km 15.229±0.114 km 15.386±0.248 km
- Synodic rotation period: 3.969±0.001 h 3.974±0.002 h
- Geometric albedo: 0.1744±0.0145; 0.19±0.09; 0.2021 (derived); 0.2022±0.043; 0.227±0.013; 0.235±0.028
- Spectral type: S (family-based)
- Absolute magnitude (H): 11.47±0.33; 11.50; 11.60; 12.00

3724 Annenskij, provisional designation 1979 YN_{8}, is a stony Gefionian asteroid from the central regions of the asteroid belt, approximately 14 kilometers (9 miles) in diameter. It was discovered on 23 December 1979, by Soviet astronomer Lyudmila Zhuravleva at the Crimean Astrophysical Observatory in Nauchnij, on the Crimean peninsula. The S-type asteroid has a rotation period of 3.97 hours. It was named for Russian poet Innokenty Annensky.

== Orbit and classification ==
Annenskij is a member of the Gefion family (516), a large asteroid family in the intermediate asteroid belt, named after 1272 Gefion. It is also known as the Ceres or Minerva family.

It orbits the Sun in the central main-belt at a distance of 2.3–3.2 AU once every 4 years and 7 months (1,680 days; semi-major axis of 2.77 AU). Its orbit has an eccentricity of 0.16 and an inclination of 8° with respect to the ecliptic. The body's observation arc begins with its first observation as 1933 XB at Heidelberg Observatory in December 1933, or 46 years prior to its official discovery observation at Nauchnij.

== Physical characteristics ==
Based on its classification into the Gefion family, Annenskij is a stony S-type asteroid.

=== Rotation period ===
Two rotational lightcurves of Annenskij were obtained from photometric observations by Italian and French amateur astronomers Silvano Casulli, Laurent Bernasconi and Cyril Cavadore . Lightcurve analysis gave a rotation period of 3.969 and 3.974 hours with a brightness amplitude of 0.30 and 0.28 magnitude (U=3-/3).

=== Diameter and albedo ===
According to the surveys carried out by the Infrared Astronomical Satellite IRAS, the Japanese Akari satellite and the NEOWISE mission of NASA's Wide-field Infrared Survey Explorer, Annenskij measures between 12.09 and 15.386 kilometers in diameter and its surface has an albedo between 0.1744 and 0.235.

The Collaborative Asteroid Lightcurve Link derives an albedo of 0.2021 and a diameter of 14.15 kilometers based on an absolute magnitude of 11.6.

== Naming ==
This minor planet was named after Russian poet and writer Innokenty Annensky (1855–1909). The official naming citation was published by the Minor Planet Center on 4 June 1993 (M.P.C. 22246) with a correction on Annensky's date of death published on 4 February 1996 (M.P.C. 26439).
