= Apollinariya Yakubova =

Russian revolutionary (died 1913/1917)

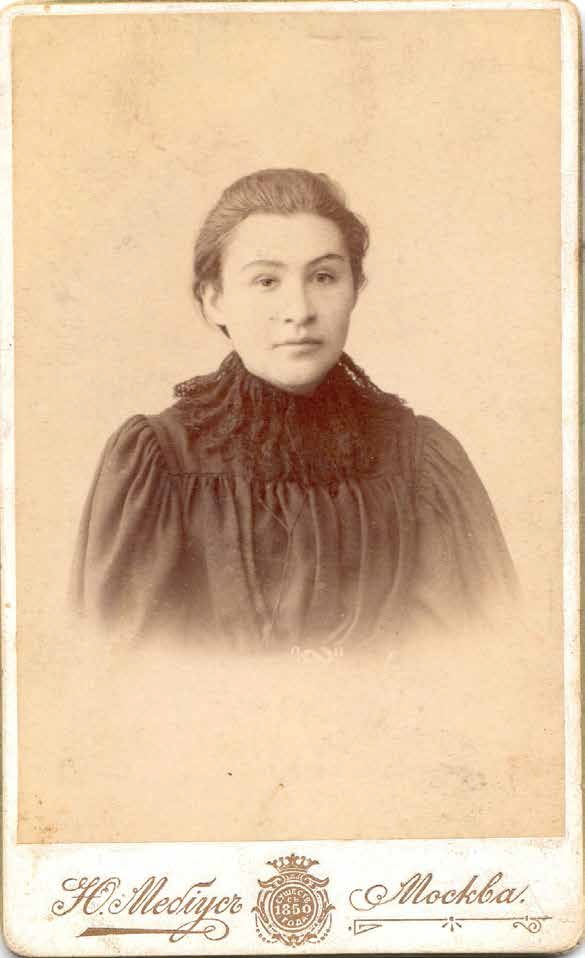
Yakubova in Moscow before her exile to Siberia, 1898.

Apollinariya Alexandrovna Yakubova^{α} (Russian: Аполлинария Александровна Якубова, died 1913 or 1917) was a Russian Marxist revolutionary and, with Vladimir Lenin, one of the founders of the League of Struggle for the Emancipation of the Working Class.

== Career ==
Yakubova was the daughter of a priest, and studied physics and mathematics in St. Petersburg. After escaping a prison camp in Siberia where she had been held for her revolutionary activity, Yakubova and her husband fled to London around 1900, where she was active in organizing debates on communist doctrine.

She became close friends with Lenin's wife Nadezhda Krupskaya and also associated closely with Lenin when he was in London, although the two eventually fell out over doctrinal disagreements. The American journalist Louis Fischer advanced, in 1964, the theory that she rejected a proposal of marriage by Lenin, and whether for this reason or another, she also earned the enmity of her former friend Krupskaya.

Yakubova returned to Russia with her husband in 1908, but what became of her then is unknown, and her date of death is variously given as 1913 or 1917. According to the historian Robert Henderson: "be it by decree of Lenin, or Krupskaya, or for some other entirely different reason, [Yakubova] appears to have been almost written out of history".

From 1909 to 1910, she lived seriously ill with tuberculosis at the cottage of L. M. Knipovich in Stirsudden, Finland, now Overski village in Leningrad Oblast, Russia.

Sources disagree on the year and location of her death. Some sources state that she died in 1913 in Vologda Oblast. Others state that she died in 1917 in Stirsudden, at N. M. Knipovich's cottage.

== Notes ==
^α Also romanized as Apollinaria Yakubova, or as Apollinariia Iakubova.
