= Venedikt Miakotin =

Russian historian and politician

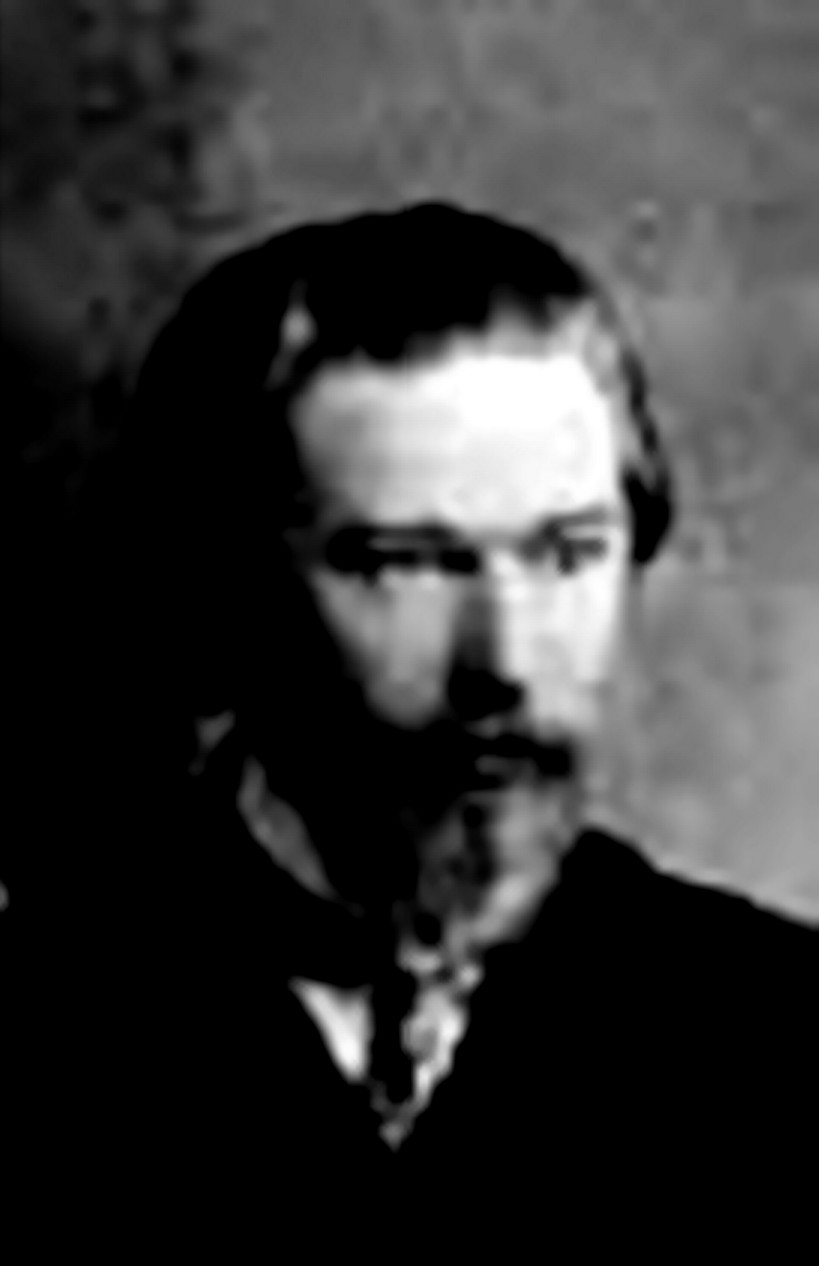
V.A. Miakotin in 1906

Venedikt Aleksandrovich Miakotin (Russian: Венеди́кт Алекса́ндрович Мяко́тин; 12 March 1867 – 5 October 1937) was a Russian historian and Narodnik politician.

== Biography ==
V. A. Miakotin was born in Gatchina, Saint Petersburg Governorate. Miakotin was educated at the Kronstadt gymnasium and the University of Saint Petersburg, where he studied history and philology. He subsequently became a professor of history at Saint Petersburg University. He also lectured at the Aleksandrovsky Lyceum and the Alexander Military Law Academy. During his student days, he was greatly influenced by narodnik writers like N.K. Mikhailovsky, and by French romantic historians. These influences he combined with detailed statistical information gathered by the zemstvo movement. In the 1890s Miakotin was associated with the 'Legal Populist' movement and contributed to the liberal journal Russkoe Bogatstvo (Russian Wealth), becoming a member of its editorial board in 1904. He collaborated closely with A.V. Peshekhonov and N.F. Annensky. Together with them and with former Marxists like P.B. Struve and S.N. Prokopovich, and liberal nationalists like P.N. Miliukov, Miakotin founded the 'Union of Liberation' in 1904, from which the Constitutional-Democratic Party emerged.

However, Miakotin, like other 'Legal Populists', also maintained contact with illegal circles and with the Socialist-Revolutionaries. He was involved in the liberal 'banquet campaign' of 1904 (modelled on the French oppositional banquets organised on the eve of the 1848 revolution) and was arrested several times. In 1905 he tried to mediate between striking workers and the authorities, but was unable to prevent the 'Bloody Sunday' massacre, which triggered the Revolution of 1905. During the Revolution, Miakotin helped organise the radical 'Union of Writers' and participated in the 'Union of Unions'. He also briefly joined the Socialist-Revolutionary Party but rejected its adoption of terrorism and the influence of Marxism on its leading theoreticians (V.M. Chernov, N.S. Rusanov et al.) In 1906, Miakotin belonged to the narodnik group which broke with the PSR and founded the Popular Socialist Party (NSP). He was elected to the First Duma in 1906 and collaborated closely with the Trudovik (Labour) group around A.F. Kerensky. He also helped edit the NSP's journal Narodnoe Slovo (The People's Word).

In 1914, Miakotin adopted a 'Defencist' position with regard to the First World War, although he had previously been sharply critical of official tsarist Great Russian nationalism and rejected imperialist war aims. He supported the February Revolution of 1917, became a member of the central committee of the NSP and helped merge it with the Trudoviki. He supported a liberal-socialist coalition of "all democratic forces" and a continuation of the war effort, long after this had ceased to be a popular position even among moderate socialists. Miakotin opposed the October Revolution and was one of the leaders of the anti-Bolshevik 'Union for the Revival of Russia'. In 1918 he went to southern Russia, was arrested and imprisoned. In 1922 he was expelled in perpetuity from the Soviet Union. Miakotin became a professor of history at the University of Sofia in 1928. He eventually settled in Prague and died there in 1937.

Miakotin wrote many works on Russian and Ukrainian history, including Istoriia na Rossiia (1936), Na zarie russkoǐ obshchestvennosti (1905) and Iz istorii russkago obshchestva (1902).
