= Innokenty Annensky =

Russian poet, critic and translator (1855–1909)

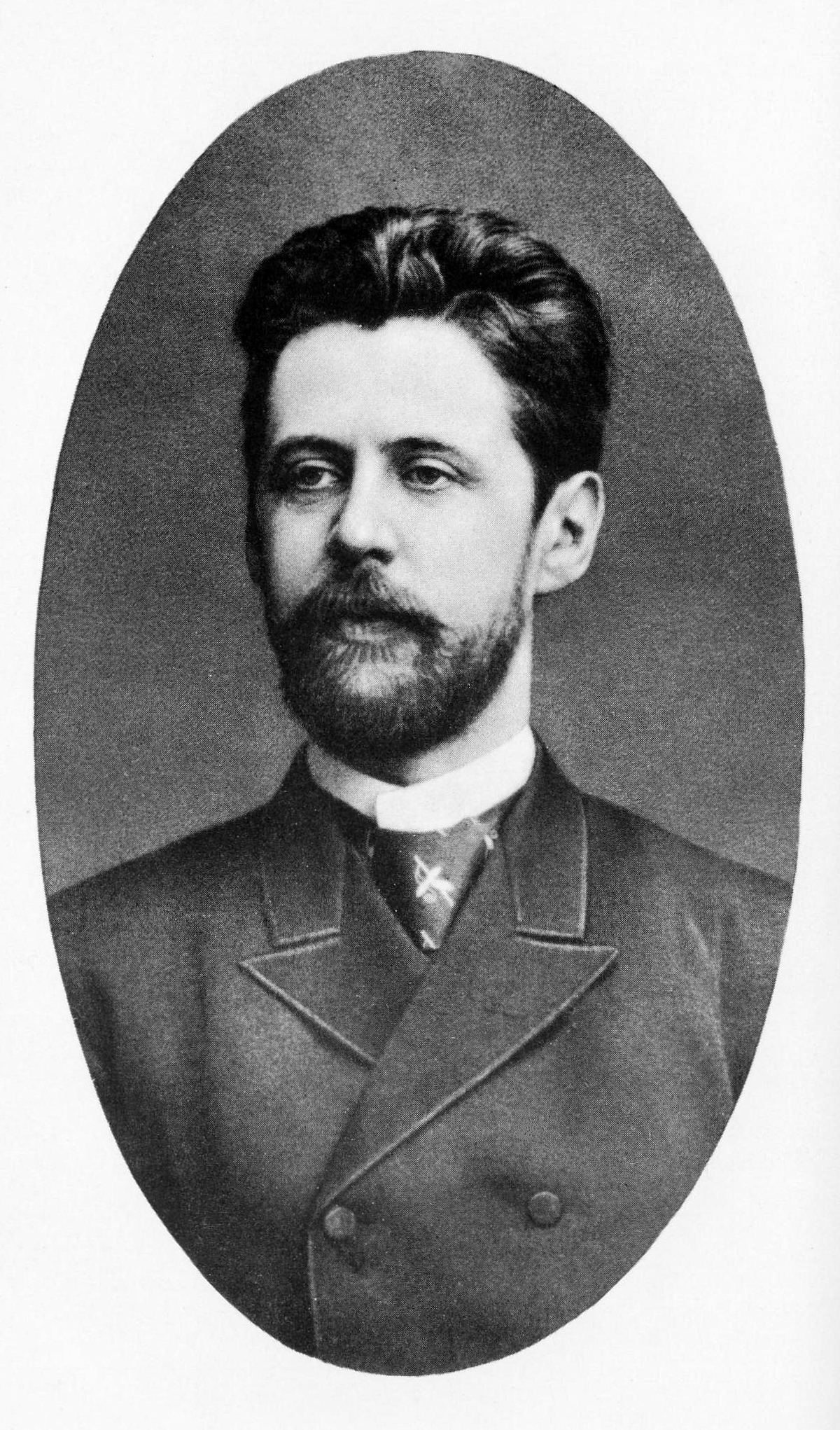
- Born: Innokenty Fyodorovich Annensky; 1 September [O.S. 20 August] 1855; Omsk, Russian Empire
- Died: 13 December [O.S. 30 November] 1909 (aged 54); Saint Petersburg, Russian Empire

Innokenty Fyodorovich Annensky (Russian: Инноке́нтий Фёдорович А́нненский, IPA: [ɪnɐˈkʲenʲtʲɪj ˈfʲɵdərəvʲɪtɕ ˈanʲɪnskʲɪj]; (1 September [O.S. 20 August] 1855, Omsk – 13 December [O.S. 30 November] 1909, Saint Petersburg) was a poet, critic, scholar, and translator, representative of the first wave of Russian Symbolism, although he was not well known for his poetry until after his death. In fact, Annensky never wrote professionally; he made little to no income from writing. Instead, he spent his career in academia as a full-time professor and administrator, translator of classic Greek works, and writer of essays and reviews. Despite this, Annensky is considered to be one of the most significant Russian poets from the early 20th century. Critics have cited Annensky's connection to French Symbolism and to the French poet Stéphane Mallarmé for their shared use of "associative symbolism." Annensky was considered to be an under-recognized or neglected poet, but he later gained recognition, particularly in the West, because a number of later Russian poets, such as Mandelstam, Akhmatova, Pasternak, and Mayakovsky, were inspired and influenced by his work.

== Biography ==
Annensky was born into the family of a public official in Omsk on 1 September [O.S. 20 August] 1855. In 1860, while still a child, he was taken to Saint Petersburg. Annensky lost his parents early on, and was raised in the family of his older brother, Nikolai Annensky, a prominent Narodnik and political activist.

In 1879, Annensky graduated from the philological department of St. Petersburg University, where he concentrated on Historical-comparative linguistics. He became a teacher, and taught classical languages and ancient literature studies in a gymnasium in Tsarskoe Selo. He served as the Director of this school from 1886 until his death in 1909. Nikolai Gumilev graduated from this school and called Annensky "the last of Tsarskoe Selo's swans."

Annensky was somewhat reluctant to publish his original poems and first gained fame with his translations of Euripides and the French Symbolists. From 1890 until his death in 1909, he translated all the works of Euripides from Ancient Greek . At the beginning of the 1900s, Annensky wrote a series of tragedies modelled after those of ancient Greece: Melanippe the Wise (1901), King Ixion (1902), Laodamia (1906), and Thamyris the Citharode (1913).

As a literary critic, Annensky published Book of Reflections and Second Book of Reflections on Russian and European novelists, poets, and playwrights. His essays were sometimes termed "critical prose" because of the artistic value of these texts. During his last months, Annensky worked as an editor of Sergei Makovsky's journal Apollon, in which he published some essays on poetry theory. Nikolai Gumilev valued these theoretical works very highly and considered Annensky to be the first true acmeist.

In literary history, Annensky is remembered primarily as a poet. He started writing poetry in the 1870s but did not publish it. He decided not to publish any works until he was 35, advice that was given by his older brother Nikolai. His first collection of poems, entitled Quiet Songs, was published in 1904 under the pseudonym Nik. T.-o (i.e., Никто, "No one" in Russian). Because Annensky was a director of a public school at the time, publishing this avant garde work under his real name would have been controversial. The book gained moderate praise from leading Symbolists, some of whom didn't suspect that Annensky was the author. Annensky's second book, The Cypress Chest (1910), is his best known collection of poetry. Many of his unpublished pieces were later edited and released posthumously in the 1920s by his son, Valentin Krivich.

On 13 December [O.S. 30 November] 1909, while heading to a meeting to discuss an unpublished essay about Euripides at the Society of Classical Philology, Annensky died from a heart attack at the Tsarskoe Selo railway station in Saint Petersburg.

== Poetic assessment ==
Annensky was interested in Symbolism, and he followed its growth in both Europe and Russia. This, combined with his knowledge of poetry, can be seen in his verses. Setchkarev, the author of the first critical study of Annensky, claims that Annensky was likely the "most pessimistic of the Russian Symbolists". Annensky saw life as a "wicked enchantment" and an unhappy nightmare that he knew would end in death. The specificities and unknowns of death raise questions within Symbolist poetry, and it has a particularly strong position in Annensky's poetry. He sensed that life was nothing without the inescapable concept of death and wrote often about symbols of life and time.

Shown below are the poems "October Myth" and "Tears Fall in My Heart" by Annensky and the French Symbolist Verlaine respectively. "October Myth" showcases Annensky's poetic style while taking inspiration from "Tears Fall in My Heart," displaying a contrast between Annensky's poetry and French Symbolism.

=== "October Myth" and "Tears Fall in My Heart" ===
Октябрьский миф

Мне тоскливо. Мне невмочь,
Я шаги слепого слышу:
Надо мною он всю ночь
Оступается о крышу.

И мои ль, не знаю, жгут
Сердце слёзы, или это
Те, которые бегут
У слепого без ответа,

Что бегут из мутных глаз
По щекам его поблёклым,
И в глухой полночный час
Растекаются по стёклам.

— Innokenty Annensky, The Cypress Chest, Published by Grif (1910), Moscow, Russia
Translation:

Il pleure dans mon cœur

Il pleure dans mon cœur
Comme il pleut sur la ville;
Quelle est cette langueur
Qui pénètre mon cœur?

Ô bruit doux de la pluie
Par terre et sur les toits!
Pour un cœur qui s’ennuie
Ô le bruit de la pluie!

Il pleure sans raison
Dans ce cœur qui s’écœure.
Quoi! nulle trahison? ...
Ce deuil est sans raison.

C’est bien la pire peine
De ne savoir pourquoi
Sans amour et sans haine,
Mon cœur a tant de peine.

— Paul Verlaine, Romances sans paroles, in Ariettes oubliées, no. 3, Sens, Typographie de Maurice L'Hermite (1874)

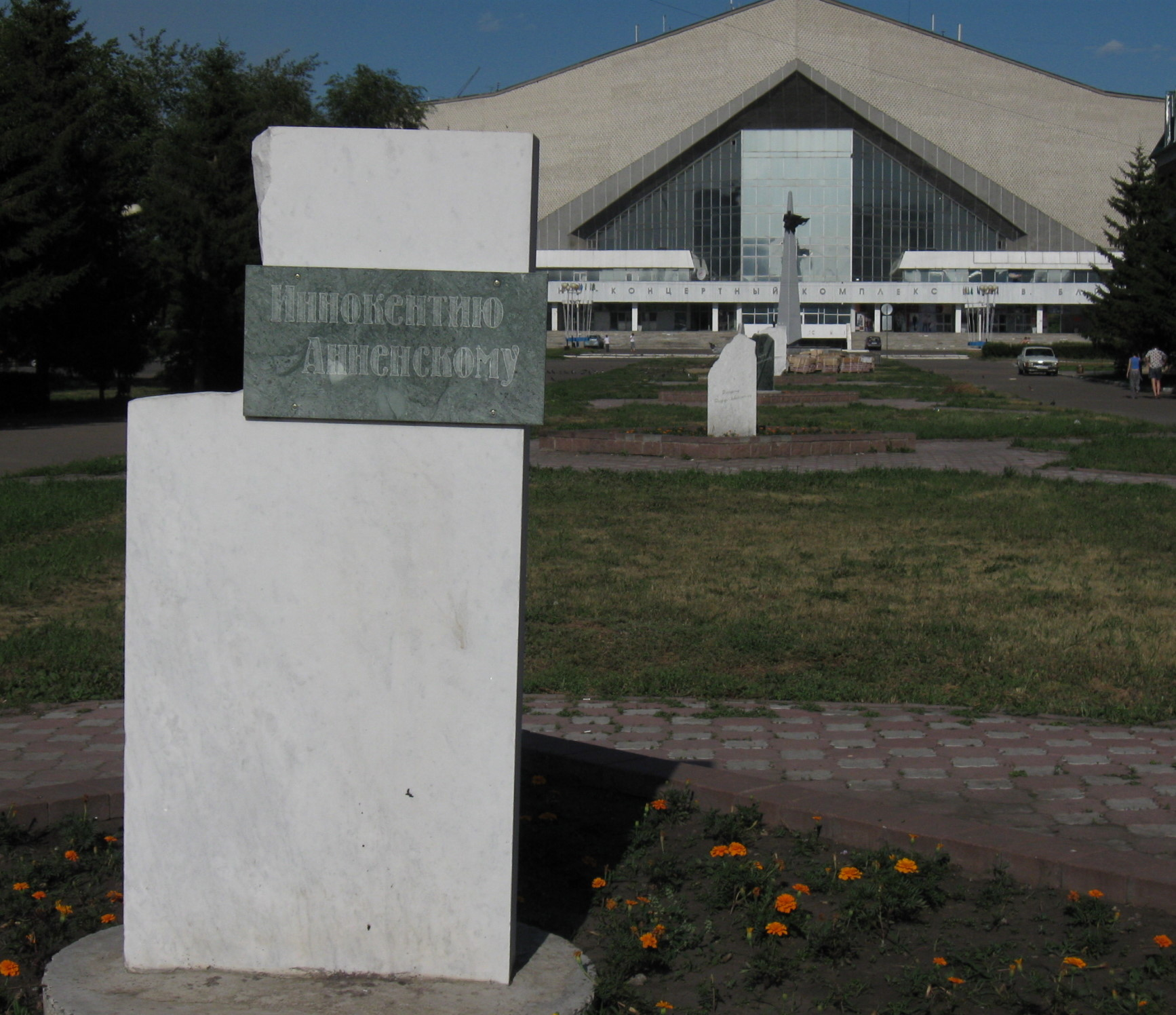
Memorial stone to Innokenty Annensky in Omsk, Russia

== Legacy ==
- Asteroid 3724 Annenskij, discovered by Soviet astronomer Lyudmila Zhuravlyova in 1979 was named in his honor.
- Memorial stone to Innokenty Annensky in Omsk, Russia (established in 2008).
