= Nicolas Lokhoff =

Russian painter (1872–1948)

- Николай Лохов
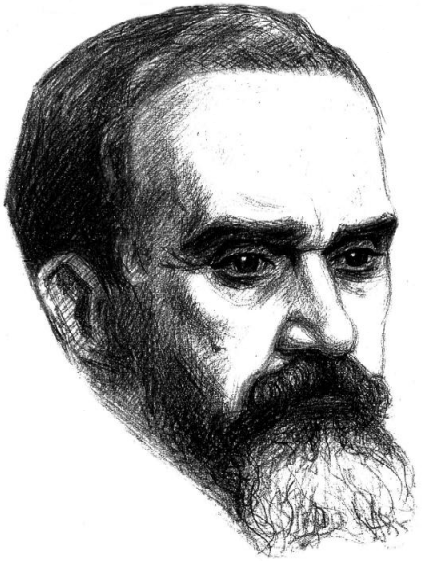
- Self-portrait of Nicolas Lokhoff (drawn in 1940s). Milan. Private collection.
- Born: 20 October 1872; Pskov, Russian Empire
- Died: 7 July 1948 (aged 75); Florence, Italy

Nicolas or Nicholas Lokhoff, also known as Nikolai Nikolaevich Lokhoff (Russian: Николай Николаевич Лохов, romanized: Nikolay Nikolayevich Lokhov; Italian: Nicola Lochoff; 20 October 1872 – 7 July 1948), was a Russian painter-copyist and restorer.

== Biography ==
Lokhoff was born into a merchant family. His father, Nikolai Nikolaevich Lokhov (Russian: Николай Николаевич Лохов; ? — 1902.02.25, Pskov, Mironositskoe cemetery), was a hereditary honorary citizen of the city of Pskov who traded in iron. In 1882 he entered the preparatory class of the Pskov Provincial Gymnasium, where, with interruptions due to illness, he studied until 1891. Then he transferred to the 8th Gymnasium of the Imperial Philanthropic Society in St. Petersburg, from which he graduated in 1893. In the same year he entered the Law Faculty of St. Petersburg University. In subsequent years, for various reasons, he was dismissed several times and was reinstated at the university. In March 1899 he was finally dismissed for participating in student unrest.

After expulsion from the university, Lokhov lived in Pskov, where he met Vladimir Lenin who was exiled there in 1900 (Lenin had no right to return to the capital after exile in Shushenskoye). On 13 October 1900 Lokhoff was sentenced to expulsion to the Astrakhan Governorate under police supervision for four years, but fled abroad. He lived in Switzerland, where he met again with Lenin. From 1899 to 1905 he was a member of the RSDLP, adjoined the wing of the Economists, and headed the foreign editorial office of the newspaper Rabochaya Mysl, which argued with Lenin's Iskra. In the newspaper he wrote articles under the pseudonym "Olkhin" (Russian: Ольхин). In 1901, he painted the famous drawing Social Pyramid. This image was repeated several times in print and became the basis for creating numerous images under the general title Pyramid of Capitalist System.

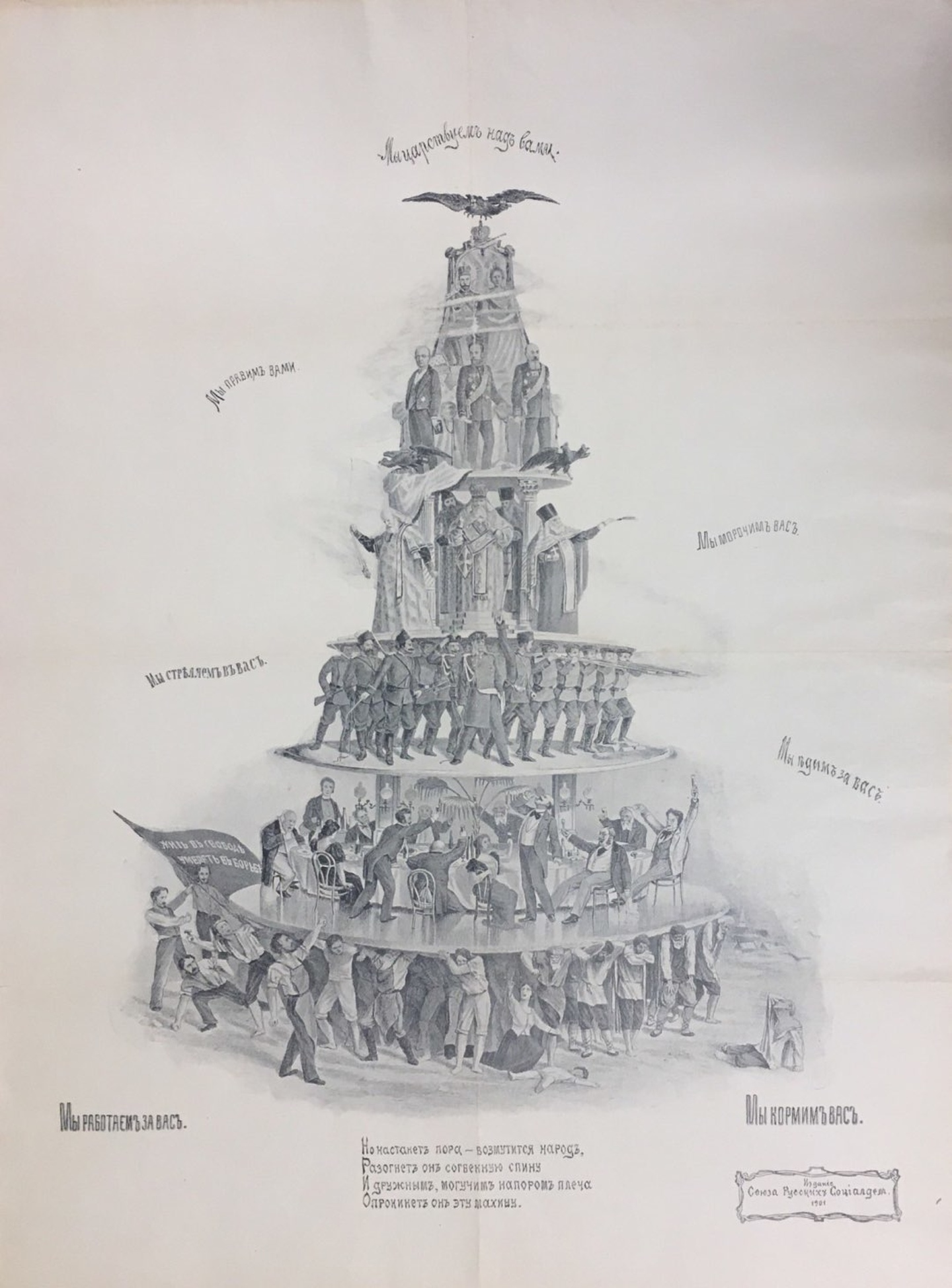
Nicholas Lokhoff. Social Pyramid, 1901. Signature under the image: «The time will come, people will be indignant They will straighten bent backs And with joint, mighty pressure of their shoulders They will overturn this colossus».

After the 2nd Congress of the Russian Social Democratic Labour Party in Brussels (1903), together with other Russian revolutionaries, he was expelled from Belgium, moved to London, and from there to Paris. He earned his living selling his paintings. In 1906 he returned to Russia. By that time, he became disillusioned with revolutionary ideas, withdrew from political activities and devoted himself to art. The main goal of life was the creation for Russia of a gallery of copies of frescoes and paintings by masters of the Italian Renaissance. The idea was supported by the director of the Moscow Museum of Fine Arts named after Alexander III, Ivan Vladimirovich Tsvetaev (the father of Marina Tsvetaeva). The financial support was provided by Vladimir Vasilievich Yakunchikov (the son of Vasily Ivanovich Yakunchikov) and the Society of Friends of the Idea of Lokhoff. The artist was given an advance payment for writing 70 copies and a manual for living abroad. In 1907, he left for Italy with his family and settled in Florence.

By this time he was married to Maria Mitrofanovna Sizareva (Russian: Мария Митрофановна Сизарева). The future spouses met in St. Petersburg as students, and became inseparable for their whole long life together. In the Florentine Russian colony, Maria Lokhoff took a prominent place, she was a churchwarden. In 1905, their son Boris was born in Paris; in 1915, their daughter Lydia was born in Florence. Lydia Nikolaevna Lokhoff, in her marriage as Cruciani, was engaged in translations from Russian into Italian. According to her texts, for example, the Florentine Opera and Ballet Theater Comunale staged the operas Mazeppa by Tchaikovsky and War and Peace by Prokofiev.

Having no artistic education, Lokhoff was self-taught, intuitively learning the secrets of art and personally experiencing them. His copies were notable for perfect accuracy, absolute fidelity to the original. He himself made the primer and paint according to old recipes, repeated the texture of the works, the nature of the stroke, the sequence of the layer and glazes, the personal techniques of the old masters.

During World War I, he was cut off from Russia, stopped receiving benefits, was in poverty, but continued to work, not forsaking the dream to send home a collection of his "works". In the 1920s, he began to work on restoration professionally and received orders from the Italian government. In particular, he restored the frescoes of Fra Angelico in the courtyard of the monastery of San Marco. In 1924–1925, as an expert on old Italian painting, he visited Paris several times. In 1927–1928 he sold several reproductions to museums and private collectors, but the paintings sold were necessarily repeated, taking care of the integrity of the collection. In the 1930s he painted landscapes of central Italy (about ten remained).

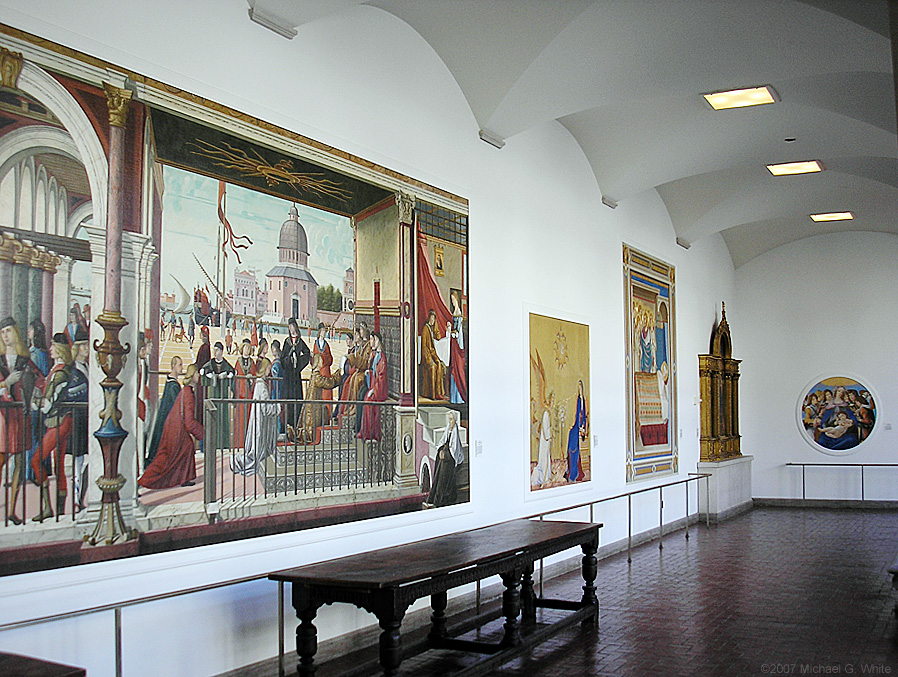
Works of Lochoff in the Nicholas Lochoff Cloister of the Frick Fine Arts Building, University of Pittsburgh

In the early 1920s Lokhoff established a relationship with the staff of the Fogg Art Museum at Harvard University. In several stages, the museum acquired three Florentine scenes from the maestro: Expulsion from the Garden of Eden by Masaccio, from the church del Carmine; Procession of the Magi (Benozzo Gozzoli), from the Palazzo Medici Riccardi; and Concert by Giorgione, from the Palazzo Pitti. Other American institutions that acquired works of Lokhoff included the Portland Art Museum in Oregon (portraits of the Duke and Duchess of Urbino by Piero della Francesca, from the Uffizi); St. Mark's School in Southborough (Triptych by Giovanni Bellini, from the Venetian dei Frari church); St. Paul's School in Concord, New Hampshire (Madonna and Two Saints by Pietro Lorenzetti, from the Basilica of St. Francis of Assisi), and others.

Nicholas Lokhoff died on 7 July 1948 and was buried in the so-called non-Catholic cemetery Allori.

The heirs of the artist through the embassy in Rome offered the USSR to purchase a collection of copies, but the Soviets refused. Then, with the assistance of art historian Bernard Berenson, 22 copies were purchased by Helen Clay Frick, daughter of American collector Henry Clay Frick, who eventually donated them to the University of Pittsburgh where they are currently displayed in the Nicholas Lochoff Cloister of the university's Frick Fine Arts Building. On 21 December 2017 a memorial plaque in his honor was erected on the building of the Pskov gymnasium, where the artist had studied.

== Gallery ==
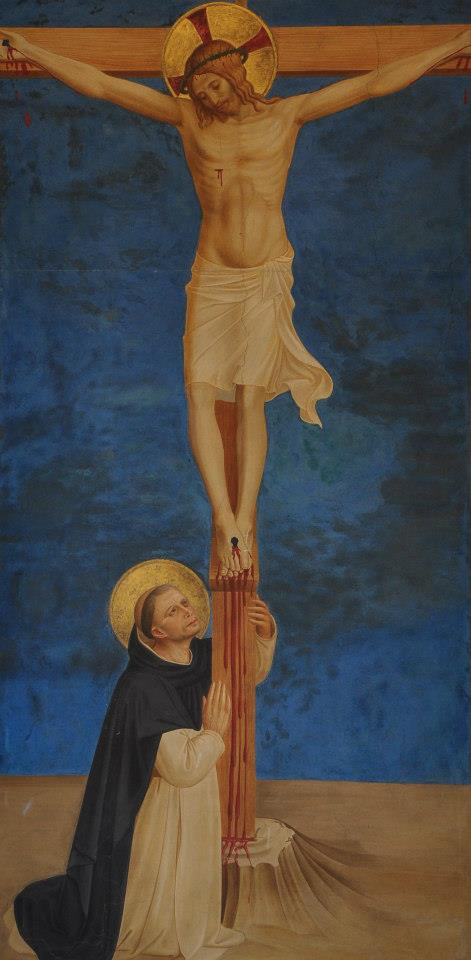
Nicolas Lokhoff. Copy of the picture. Crucifixion with Saint Dominic by Fra Angelico

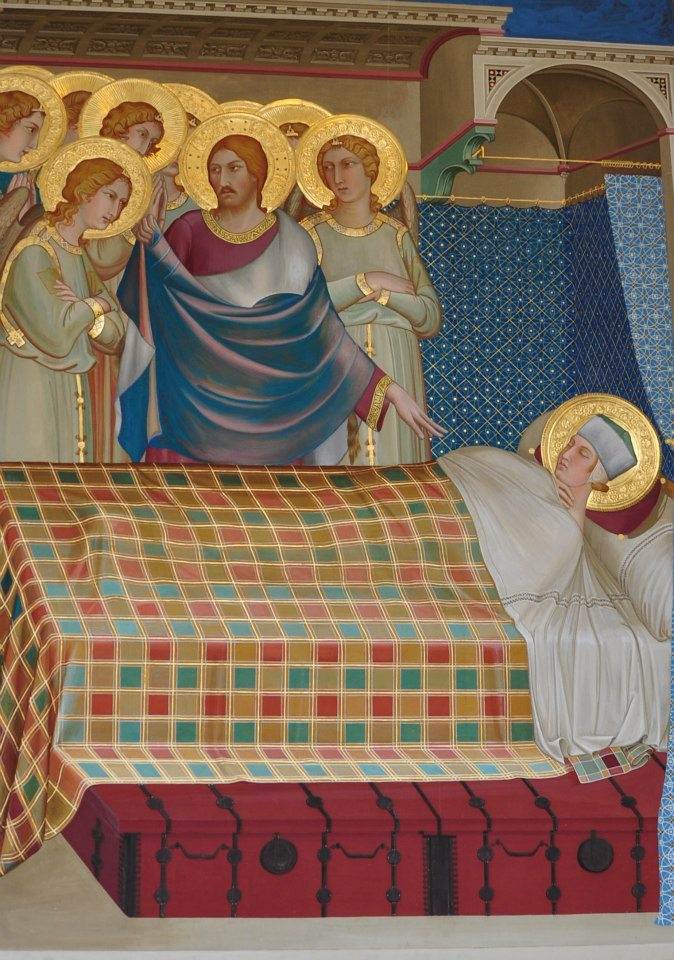
Nicolas Lokhoff. Copy of the picture: Apparition of Christ and Angels in Saint Martin's Dream by Simone Martini

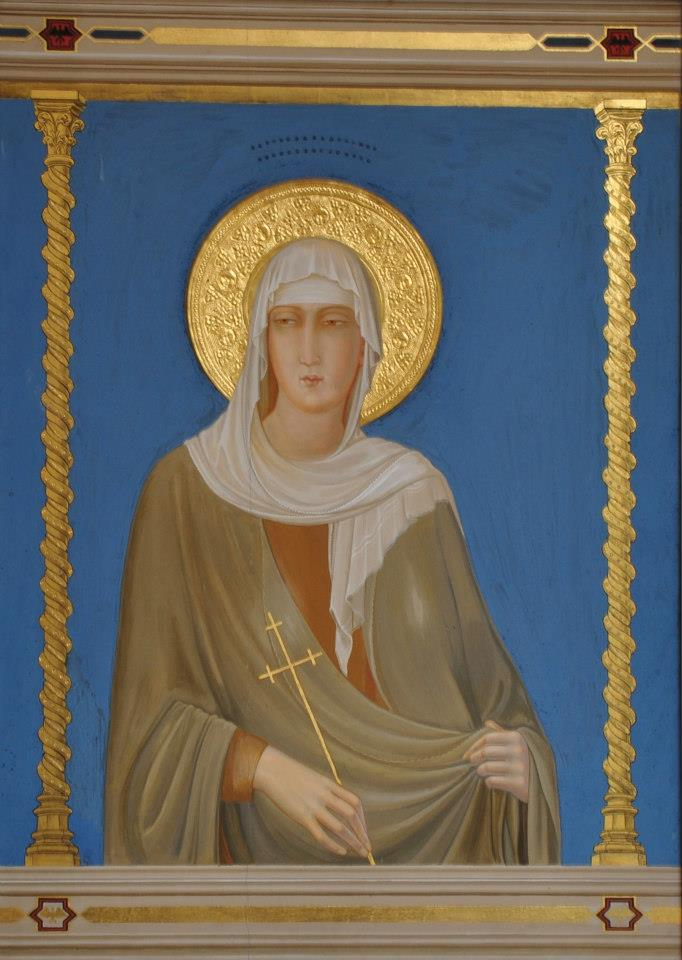
Nicolas Lokhoff. Copy of the picture: Saint Clare by Simone Martini

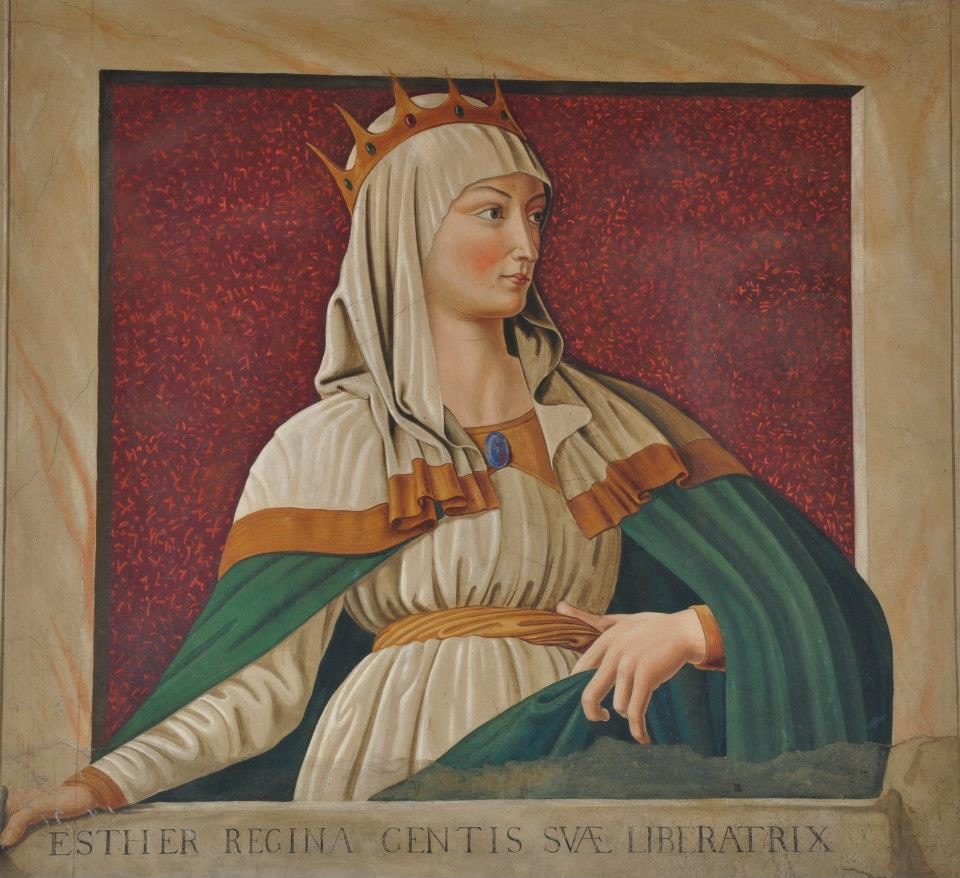
Nicolas Lokhoff. Copy of the picture: Queen Esther by Andrea del Castagno

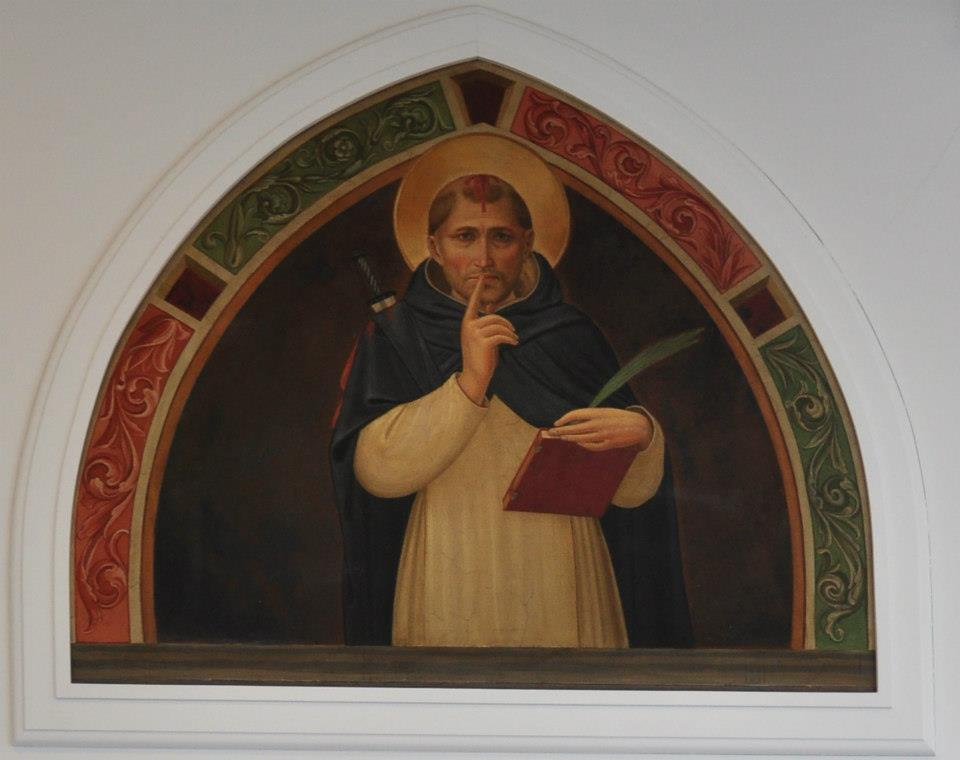
Nicolas Lokhoff. Copy of the picture: Peter Martyr Enjoins Silence by Fra Angelico

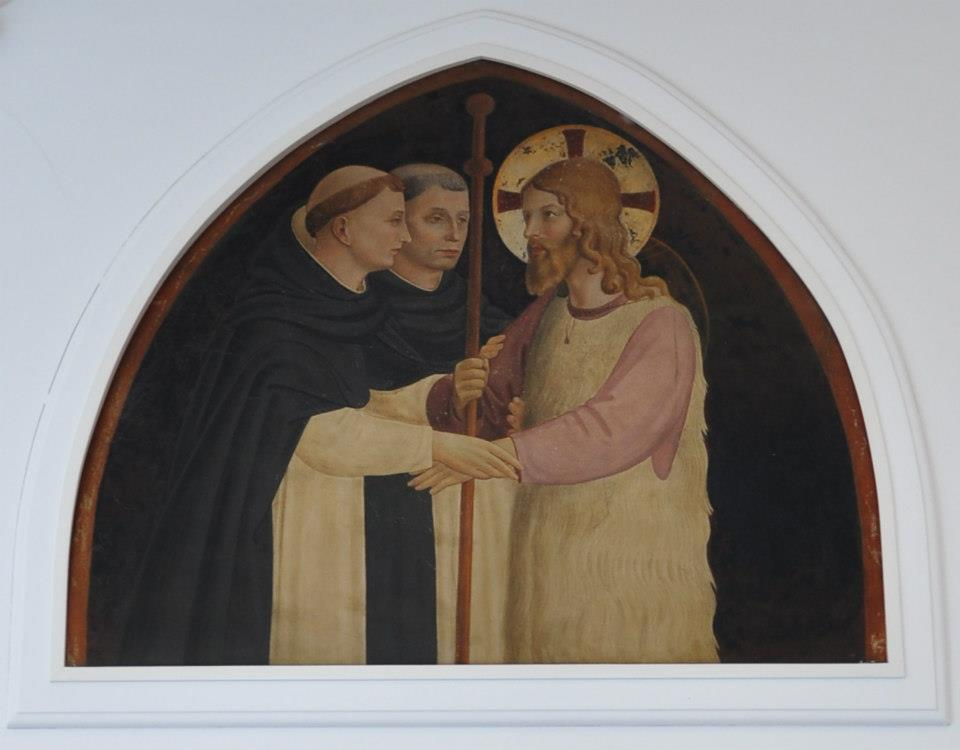
Nicolas Lokhoff. Copy of the picture: Christ as Pilgrim is Received by Two Dominicans by Fra Angelico

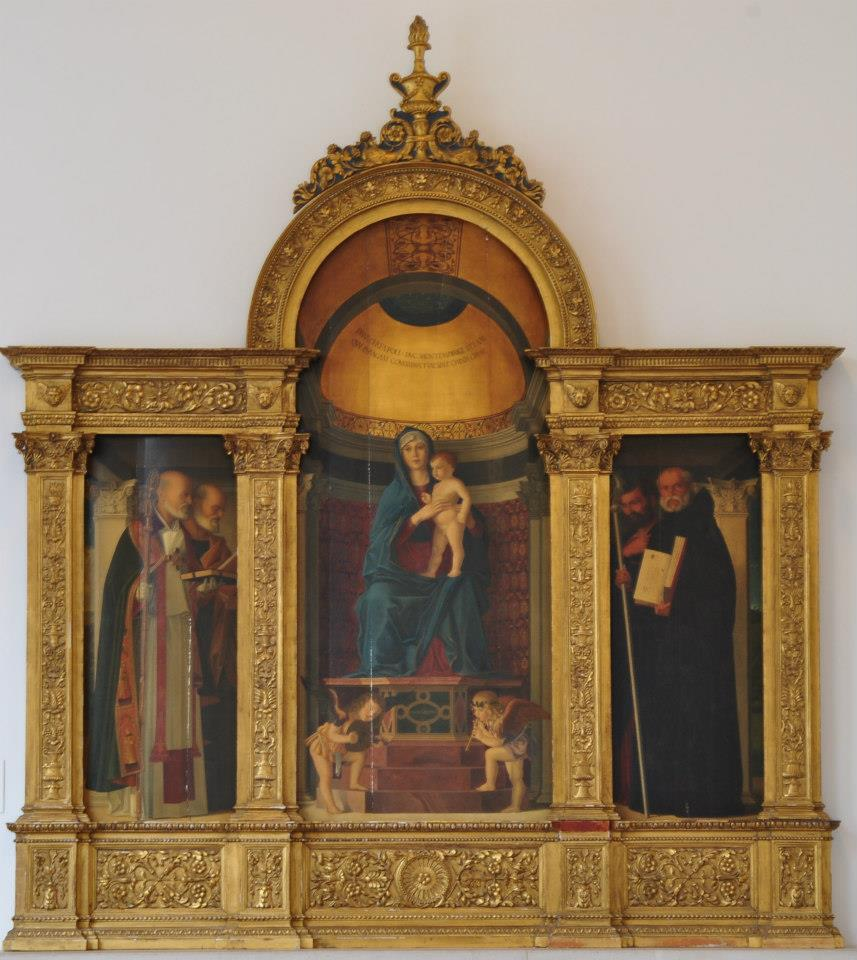
Nicolas Lokhoff. Copy of the picture: Madonna and Two Saints by Giovanni Bellini

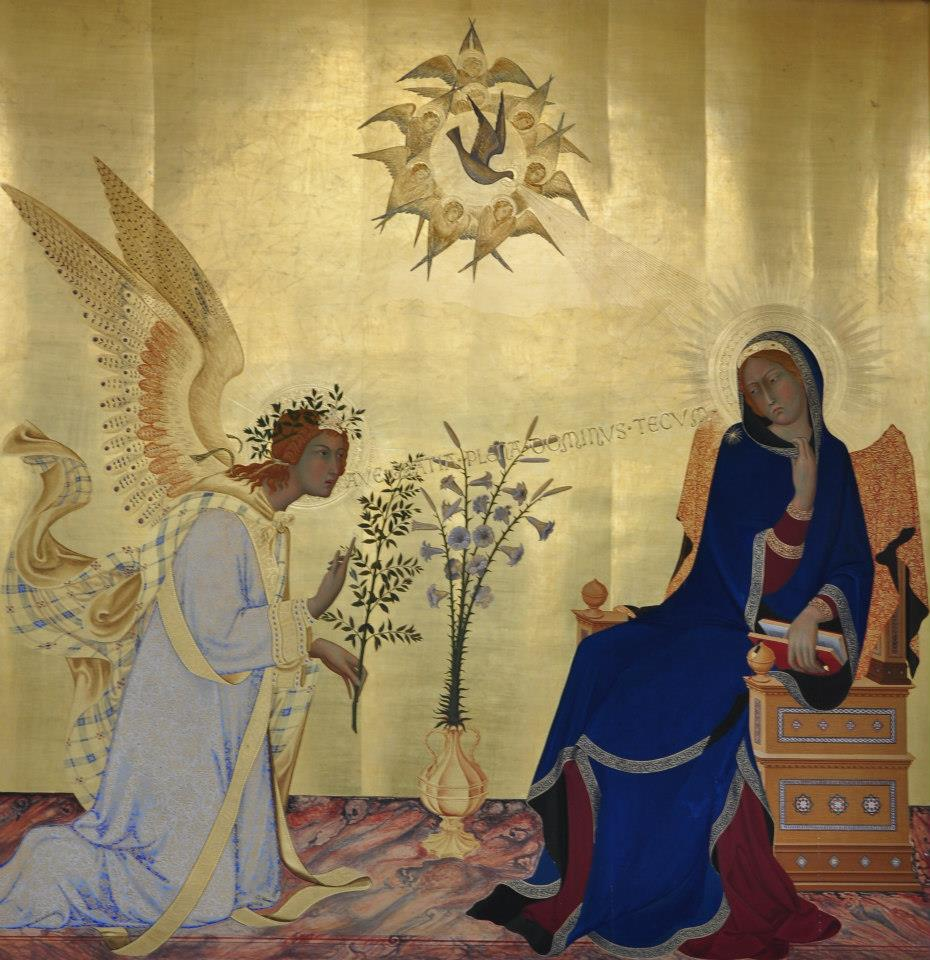
Nicolas Lokhoff. Copy of the picture: The Annunciation by Simone Martini

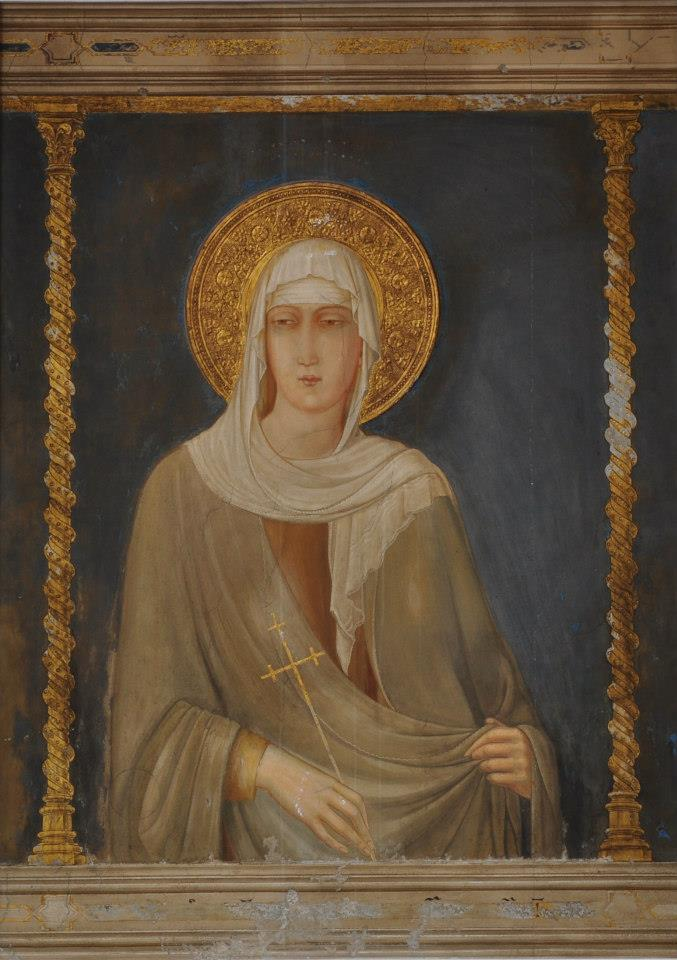
Nicolas Lokhoff. Copy of the picture: Saint Clare by Simone Martini

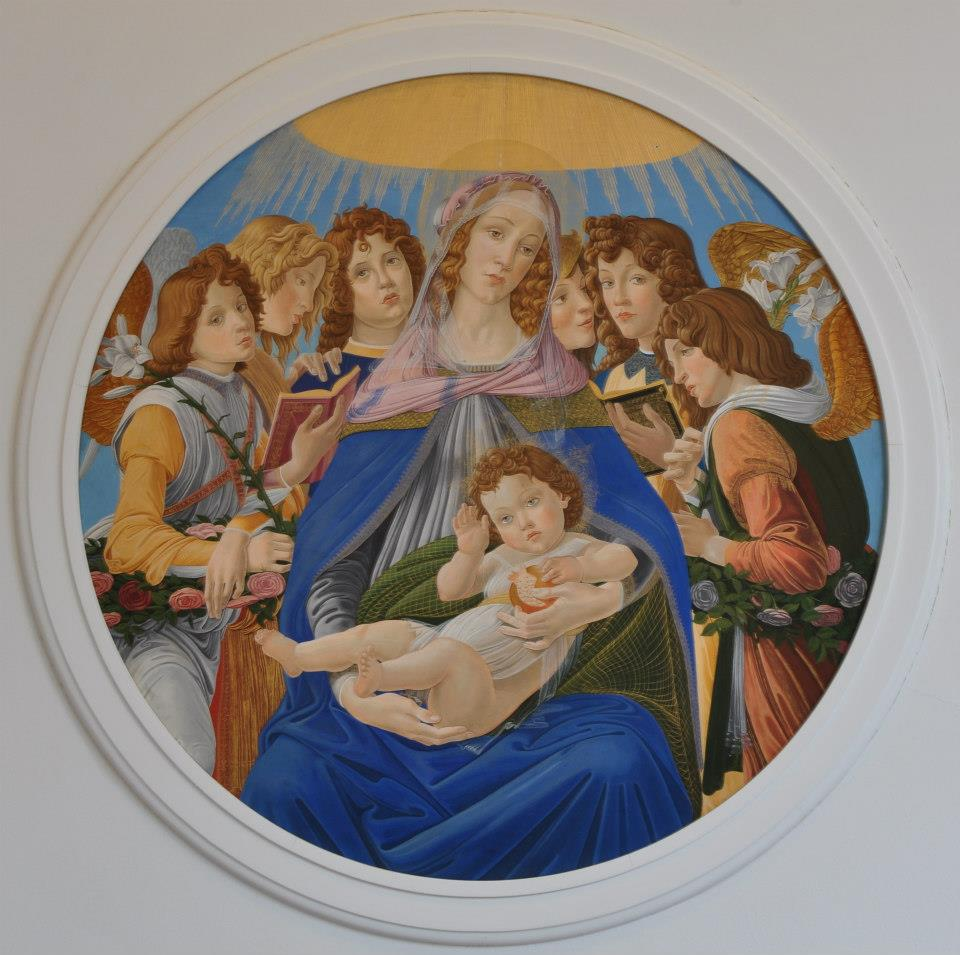
Nicolas Lokhoff. Copy of the picture: Madonna of the Pomegranate by Sandro Botticelli

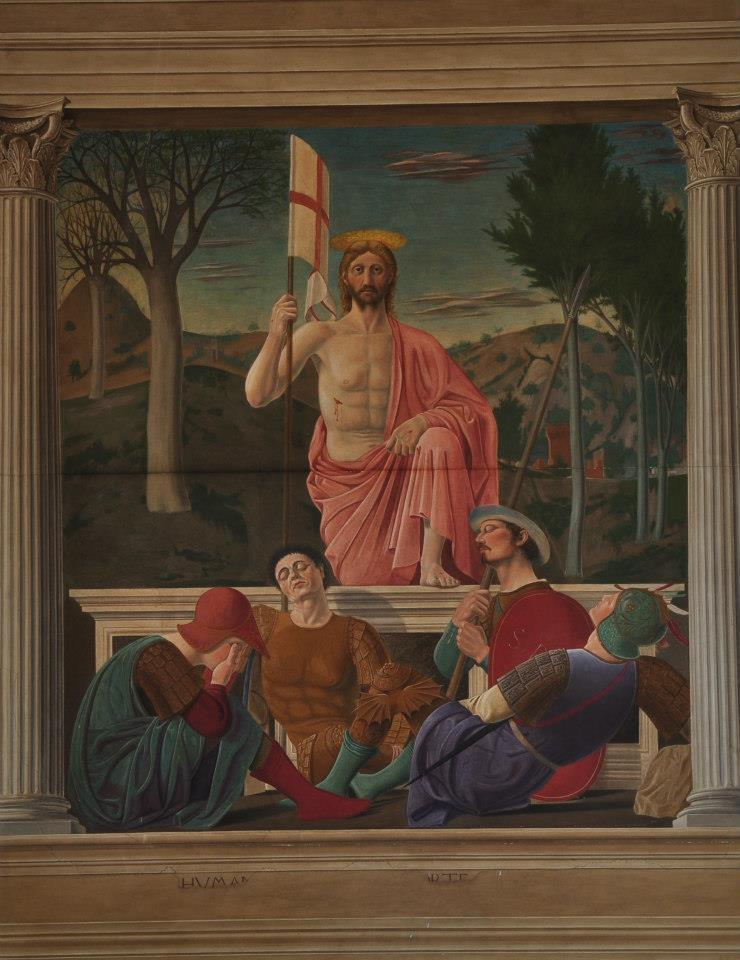
Nicolas Lokhoff. Copy of the picture: The Resurrection of Christ by Piero della Francesca

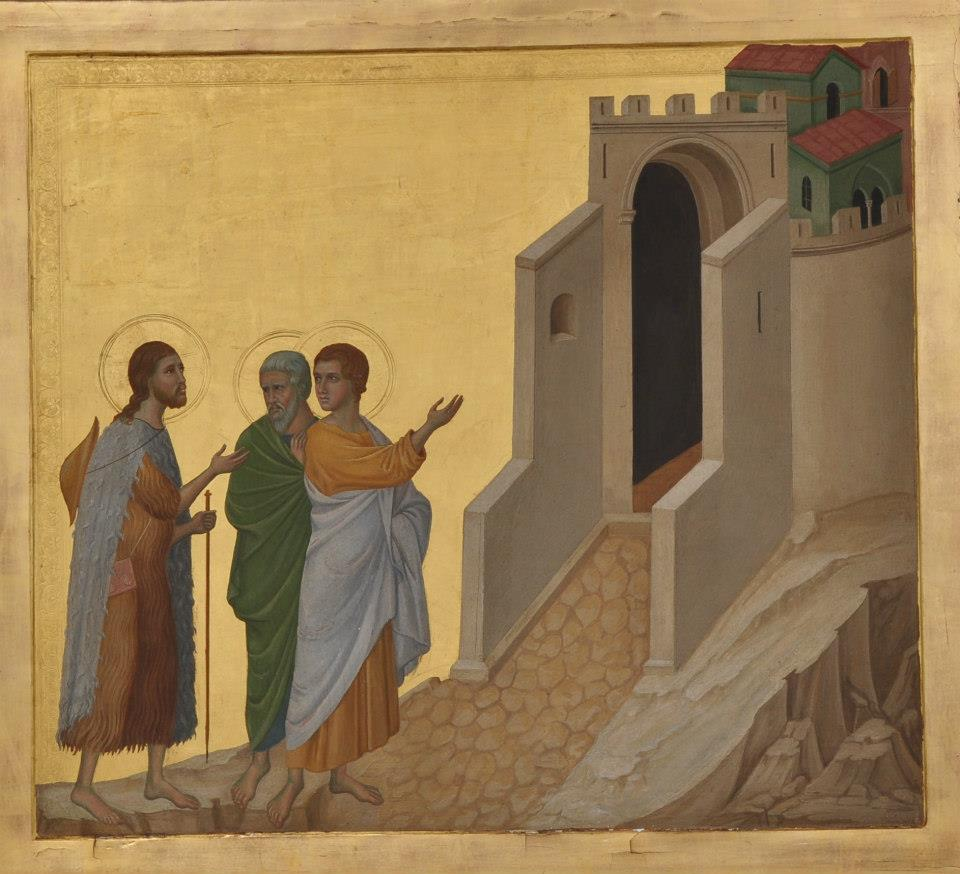
Nicolas Lokhoff. Copy of the picture: The Road to Emmaus by Duccio di Buoninsegna

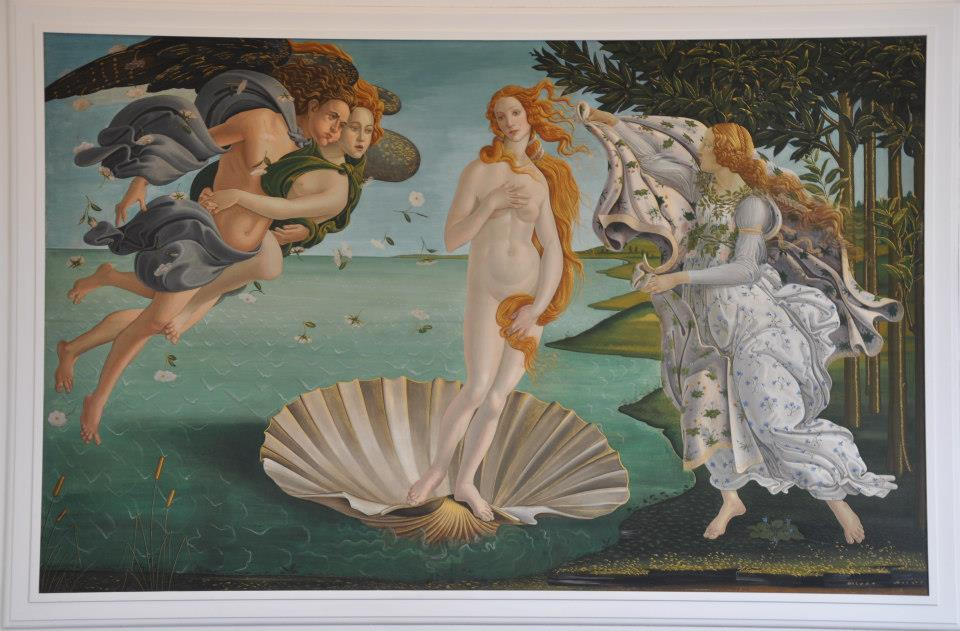
Nicolas Lokhoff. Copy of the picture: The Birth of Venus by Sandro Botticelli

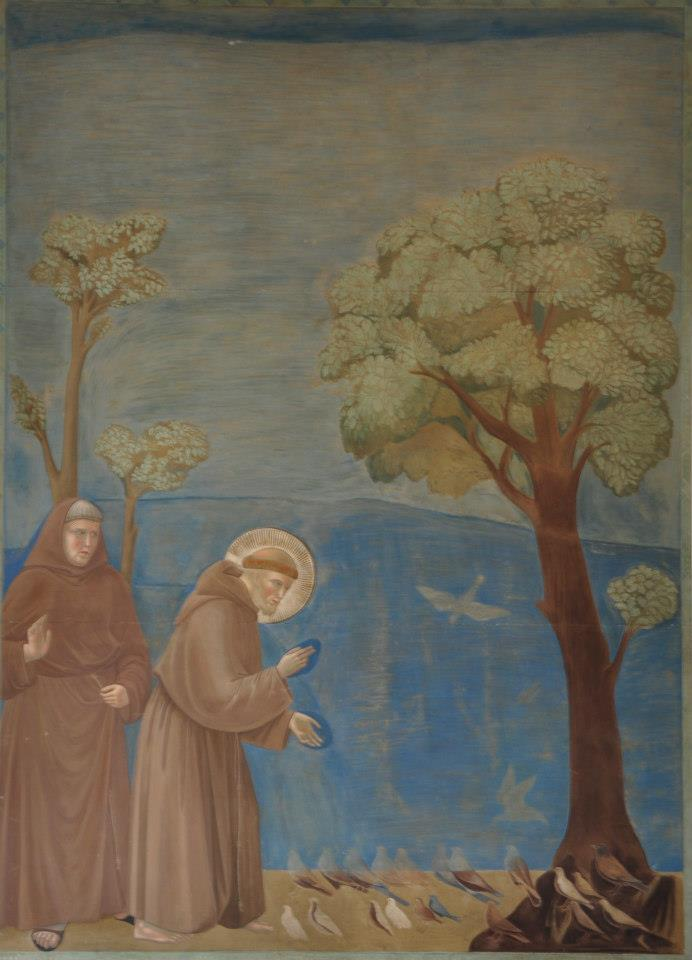
Nicolas Lokhoff. Copy of the picture. Saint Francis of Assisi Preaching to the Birds by Giotto

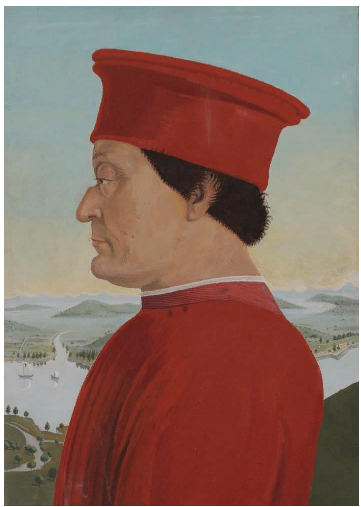
Nicolas Lokhoff. Copy of the picture: Federico da Montefeltro by Piero della Francesca

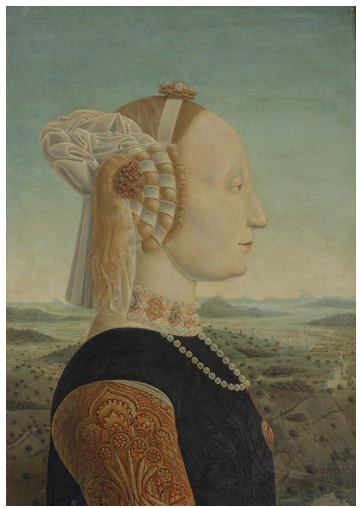
Nicolas Lokhoff. Copy of the picture: Battista Sforza by Piero della Francesca
