= Alexandra Annenskaya =

Russian translator and writer

- Александра Анненская
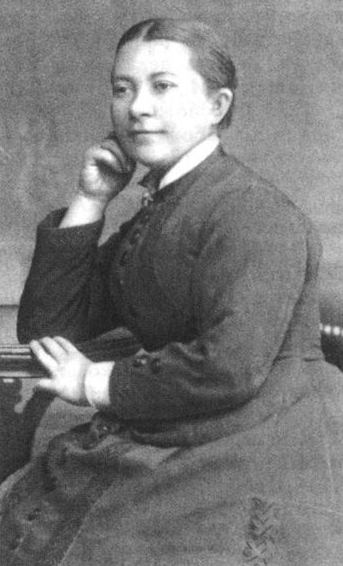
- Born: Alexandra Nikitichna Tkachyova; 11 July 1840 near Velikiye Luki, Pskov Governorate, Russian Empire
- Died: 19 May 1915 (aged 74); Petrograd, Russian Empire
- Spouse: Nikolai Annensky (m. 1866; died 1912)
- Writing career
- Genre: Young adult

Alexandra Nikitichna Annenskaya (Russian: Александра Никитична Анненская, née Tkachyova, Ткачёва; 11 July 1840 – 19 May 1915) was a Russian translator and writer who wrote feminist novels for young girls.

== Life ==
Annenskaya was born in a village in Pskov Governorate, her parents came from a noble but poor family. She began to write feminist novels for young girls. Her brother was the revolutionary writer Pyotr Tkachev who was to influence Lenin. The fatherless family moved to St Petersburg when she was eleven. She was approved as a teacher by Saint Petersburg University and she established a primary school in the 1860s. Meanwhile her brother was involved in student riots.

She married Nikolai Annensky in 1866.

He was arrested and she served time in exile with him. Meanwhile her first novel was The German Teacher and it was published in Family and School in 1871. She wrote more articles that were published in the journal up to 1886. Her most popular story may have been One's Own Way which features a young girl who finds her own purpose after she is forced to care for another younger child. Many of her stories had moral messages.

In 1873 she achieved success with a version of Robinson Crusoe, and she translated stories by Mark Twain, Ethel Voinich, Mary Ward and H. G. Wells. In the 1890s she took to biographies creating descriptions of the lives of people like Charles Dickens, George Sand and Gogol. She also described the exploits of explorers and role models like Michael Faraday, George Washington and Benjamin Franklin.

== Death ==
Annenskaya died in Saint Petersburg in 1915.
