= Nikolai Annensky =

Russian economist, statistician, writer and politician

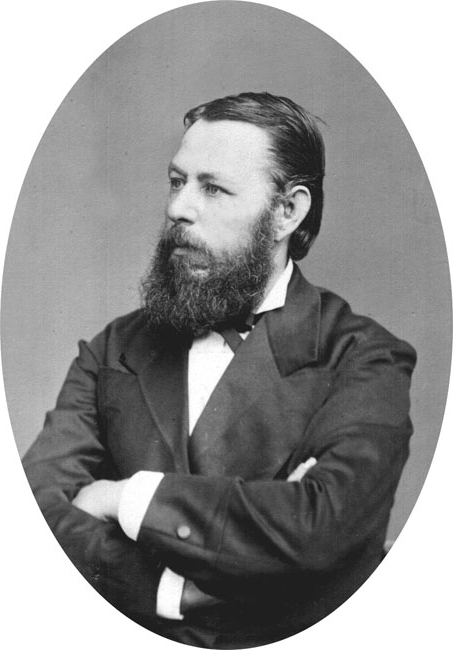
N.F. Annensky in the 1870s

Nikolai Feodorovich Annensky (Russian: Никола́й Фёдорович А́нненский; 12 March 1843 – 8 August 1912) was a Russian economist, statistician and politician. He was a member of the populist (narodnik) movement and the Socialist-Revolutionary Party before becoming one of the founders of the Russian Popular Socialist Party (NSP) in 1906.

== Biography ==
Annensky was born in St. Petersburg, Russia and attended the University there. When he was young, he lost both of his parents and had to care for his younger siblings, including the future Russian poet Innokenty Annensky. As a student, N.F. Annensky became involved in the revolutionary populist movement. He was also strongly influenced by the writings of N.K. Mikhailovsky. Like Mikhailovsky, Annensky rejected Marxism, which was just beginning to influence the Russian socialist movement, because it seemed to condemn the Russian peasantry to be sacrificed to the development of industrial capitalism. Instead, Annensky desired an agrarian socialism based on the peasant commune.

Annensky married the teacher and later children's writer Alexandra Nikitichna Annenskaya in 1866. They had no children, but they adopted Tatiana Bogdanovich who was their niece and who too would be a writer.

In 1869, Annensky was arrested, but later released, when the police were investigating a murder committed by the revolutionary Sergey Nechayev, whose associates included Alexandra's brother, Pyotr Tkachev.

In the 1870s and 80s, Annensky was a major representative of Legal Populism and contributed to such journals as Notes of the Fatherland (Otechestvennye Zapiski) and The Cause (Delo). At the same time, he kept in contact with illegal narodnik circles.

Annensky was arrested again in 1879, after an attempt on the life of the Tsar Alexander II by the revolutionary Alexander Soloviev, but was released after he had proved his innocence. In 1880, he was arrested for the third time, on the grounds of "political unreliability" and exiled to Tara, which at that time was in Tobolsk province, in Siberia. Released in 1883, he worked as a statistician in Kazan, and then as head of Nizhni Novgorod provincial zemstvo, in 1887-95. In 1893, he was involved in founding the People's Right party. In 1895, he became head of the statistical office of the city administration of St. Petersburg. At the same time, he joined the Free Economic Society and the radical St. Petersburg Writers Union. Annensky's work as a statistician enabled him to gather valuable information on the social conditions of workers and peasants in turn-of-the-century Russia.

In 1901, he was arrested and exiled again for participating in an anti-government demonstration. After his release, he lived in Finland, where he was involved in founding the Union of Liberation in 1903 with former Marxists P.B. Struve, S.N. Prokopovich and others. This became the nucleus of the Constitutional-Democratic Party; (Ka-Dets), tsarist Russia's main liberal party. However, Annensky also retained his connections with narodnik socialism and became involved in the Socialist-Revolutionary Party (PSR). He argued strenuously against the PSR's revival of political terrorism as a tactic and deplored the influence of Marxism on its leading theorists, such as V.M. Chernov.

On Bloody Sunday 22 January (O.S. 9 January 1905), Annensky was part of a delegation who presented a petition to Russia's Minister of the Interior, drafted by Father Georgy Gapon, while a huge peaceful crowd gathered in the streets. After police had fired on the crowd, triggering the Russian Revolution of 1905, Annensky was arrested again and held for three weeks in the Trubetskoy bastion. During the revolution, he helped organise the 'Union of Unions' and became its chairman. He also became editor of the liberal journal Russian Wealth (Russkoe Bogatstvo). This was initially sympathetic to the PSR, but became increasingly opposed to its use of terror. In 1906, Annensky and other populists in the tradition of Mikhailovsky, such as A.V. Peshekhonov and V.A. Miakotin, broke with the PSR and founded the 'Popular Socialist Party' (NSP). Though numerically small, this party played an important role in the tsarist Duma, where it collaborated with the liberal Ka-Dets and the Labour or Trudovik party of A.F. Kerensky. The Popular Socialists also played an important role in the Provisional Government of Kerensky following the February Revolution of 1917. Annensky did not live to see this; he died in 1912 in Kuokkala, Finland.

== Bibliography ==
- Shukman, H. (ed.), The Blackwell Encyclopedia of the Russian Revolution. Oxford, 1988.
- Hildermeier, M., Die Sozialrevolutionäre Partei Russlands. Cologne, 1978.
