= Lydia Knipovich =

Finnish-Russian revolutionary (1856–1920)

- Лидия Книпович
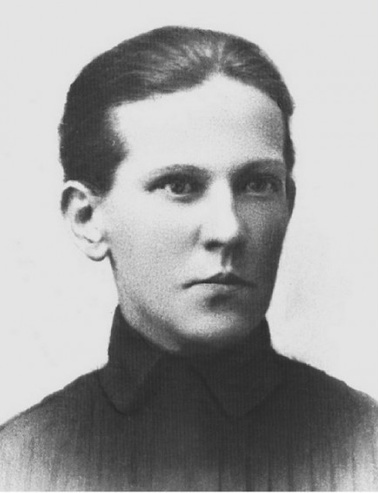
- Born: Lydia Mikhailovna Knipovich; 27 December 1856; Tuusula, Finland
- Died: 9 February 1920 (aged 63); Simferopol, Crimea, South Russia
- Political party: Russian Social Democratic Labour Party (Bolsheviks)
- Other political affiliations: Narodnaya Volya

Lydia Mikhailovna Knipovich (Russian: Лидия Михайловна Книпович; Finnish: Lidija Mihailovna Knipovitš; 1857–1920) was a Finnish-Russian revolutionary socialist. A member of Narodnaya Volya, she later joined the League of Struggle for the Emancipation of the Working Class and was arrested for illegally printing the group's publications. While in internal exile, she helped establish the socialist newspaper Iskra and joined the Bolshevik faction of the Russian Social Democratic Labour Party (RSDLP).

== Biography ==
Lydia Mikhailovna Knipovich was born in Finland, in 1857. In the late 1870s, she became a revolutionary socialist and joined the Narodnaya Volya organisation. From 1881 to 1882, she was a member of a socialist group in Helsinki, and in 1889, she moved to Saint Petersburg, where she began teaching and engaging in revolutionary activism.

Together with Nadezhda Krupskaya and Apollinariya Yakubova, she became a leader of the Saint Petersburg workers' movement during its early stages. She also became a close confindant of Vladimir Lenin. With them, she joined the League of Struggle for the Emancipation of the Working Class and clandestinely printed the group's publications.

In the summer of 1896, Knipovich was arrested and imprisoned for her revolutionary activities. According to Krupskaya, Knipovich had been given up by a typesetter she had worked with to print the group's publications. Knipovich requested that she be exiled to Ufa. She spent her years in internal exile in Astrakhan, Tver and Samara, where she remained active in the socialist movement, helping to establish the socialist newspaper Iskra. Knipovich was one of five women, out of twelve total contributors, who worked on the paper.

In 1905, Knipovich attended the Second Congress of the Russian Social Democratic Labour Party (RSDLP), where the party split into two factions. Knipovich herself joined Lenin's Bolshevik faction. She then moved to Odesa, where she was secretary of the local RSDLP committee and contributed to the publication Proletariat. In 1911, she was internally exiled to the Poltava Governorate and withdrew from political activity in 1914. After the Russian Revolution of 1917, she moved to Crimea, where she died in 1920.

== Bibliography ==
- Baev, Sergey. "КНИПОВИЧ Лидия Михайловна" [Knipovich Lydia Mikhailovna]. Нижегородская Биографическая Энциклопедия (in Russian).
- Hamilton-Dann, Mary (1998). Vladimir and Nadya: The Lenin Story. International Publishers. ISBN 9780717807123.
- Krupskaya, Nadezhda (1970) [1930]. Reminiscences of Lenin. Translated by Isaacs, Bernard. International Publishers.
- Pipes, Richard (1960). "Russian Marxism and Its Populist Background: The Late Nineteenth Century". The Russian Review. 19 (4): 316–337. JSTOR 126475.
- Young, James Peter (2008). Bolshevik Wives: A Study of Soviet Elite Society (PhD). Sydney University.
