= Alexey Peshekhonov =

Russian economist, publicist and statistician

- Алексей Пешехонов
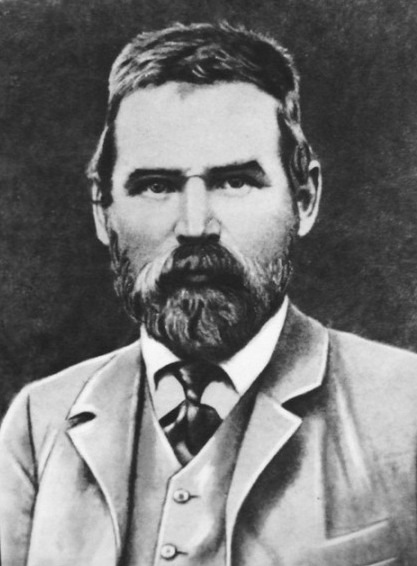

Personal details
- Born: 2 January 1867 [O.S. 21 December 1866] Chukavino Village, Staritsky Uyezd, Tver Province, Russian Empire
- Died: 3 April 1933 (aged 66) Riga, Latvia
- Citizenship: Russian Empire
- Party: Popular Socialists

Alexey Vasilyevich Peshekhonov (Russian: Алексе́й Васи́льевич Пешехо́нов; February 2, 1867 [O.S. January 21] – April 3, 1933) was a Russian economist, publicist, and statistician. He was a member of the Russian provisional government as a minister of food supplies for some months in the summer of 1917.

== Life ==
Peshekhonov was born in the Staritsky district of Tver. Enrolled early in a seminary for priests, he was expelled for political activity at age 17 in 1884, and seems to have had no further formal training. He was strongly influenced by the narodnik philosopher N.K. Mikhailovsky. After military service 1888 to 1891, he worked first as a village teacher and later as a statistician for the Tver and Orla zemstvo councils, then the Kaluga province zemstvo administration where he became head of the statistical service (1896-1898). During this period he published noted studies on rural life that earned him entry into employment as a journalist in St. Petersburg (1899). He was also during this period several times arrested for his political activities, imprisoned or banished from his place of residence.

Around the turn of the century, in addition to his journalism, Peshekhonov became increasingly active in the left-liberal political world - i.e., he was a co-founder in 1903 of the "Union of Liberation" (Soiuz osvobozhdeniia). He was also briefly a member of the Socialist-Revolutionary Party but objected to its use of terror. In 1906, he co-founded, with N.F. Annensky, V.A. Miakotin and others, the Popular Socialist Party (NSP). After the "Bloody Sunday" events of January 1905, he was locked up in the Peter and Paul Fortress, then banished until October of that year, and again arrested for several months in 1906. During the following years, Peshekhonov published several books on agrarian, economic and political issues.

In February 1917 Peshekhonov assumed leading roles as an NS delegate in the Petrograd Soviet of Worker's and Soldier's Deputies, with strong engagement on agrarian issues. He favoured co-operation of the Soviet with the (Kadet) Provisional Government, and in May 1917 joined the coalition government then formed as minister of food supplies. In October, he was deputy chairman of the pre-parliament council, and after the Bolshevik seizure of power joined the left-center opposition. In 1921 he played a leading role in organizing famine relief for Russia.

In the fall of 1922, Peshekhonov was included in the list of intellectuals to be exiled abroad by a Central Committee decree (although he does not seem to have travelled on the famous "Philosophers' ships" that took the bulk of them to Germany). In exile, he wrote extensively about the consequences of the revolution, particularly the idea of vlast, or state sovereignty, and critiqued the Bolsheviks:

With [the Bolshevik] takeover, they so to speak finished off any effect Russian state vlast: they decisively destroyed the army and swept off the face of the earth even those rudiments of a new state apparatus that the Provisional Government had tried to create. The country was thrown literally into anarchy. The Bolsheviks took even longer to re-establish the state apparatus than to recreate the army – and not because this task was so inherently difficult, but because they had no idea of how to go about it...But bit by bit they learned, and among them some talent even became evident...The state apparatus cannot yet be called complete [in 1922]: there is much that is clumsy, unnecessary, inexpedient, and even absurd.

Exiled against his will, more left-wing than most of his co-expellees, Peshekhonov unhappily pursued his economic and political studies in Berlin and Prague, but repeatedly applied for permission to return to the Soviet Union. This was never granted, but eventually he was given a post as a consultant to the Soviet Trade Mission in Riga, where he died in 1933. His remains were permitted to return and be buried in Leningrad.
