= Nasha Zhizn =

Daily liberal newspaper in St. Petersburg, Russia

Nasha Zhizn (Our Life) was a liberal daily newspaper published in St. Petersburg, Russia, from November 19, 1904, to July 24, 1906, with some intervals.
