= Nikolay Mikhaylovsky =

Russian literary critic, sociologist, writer and Narodnik theoretician

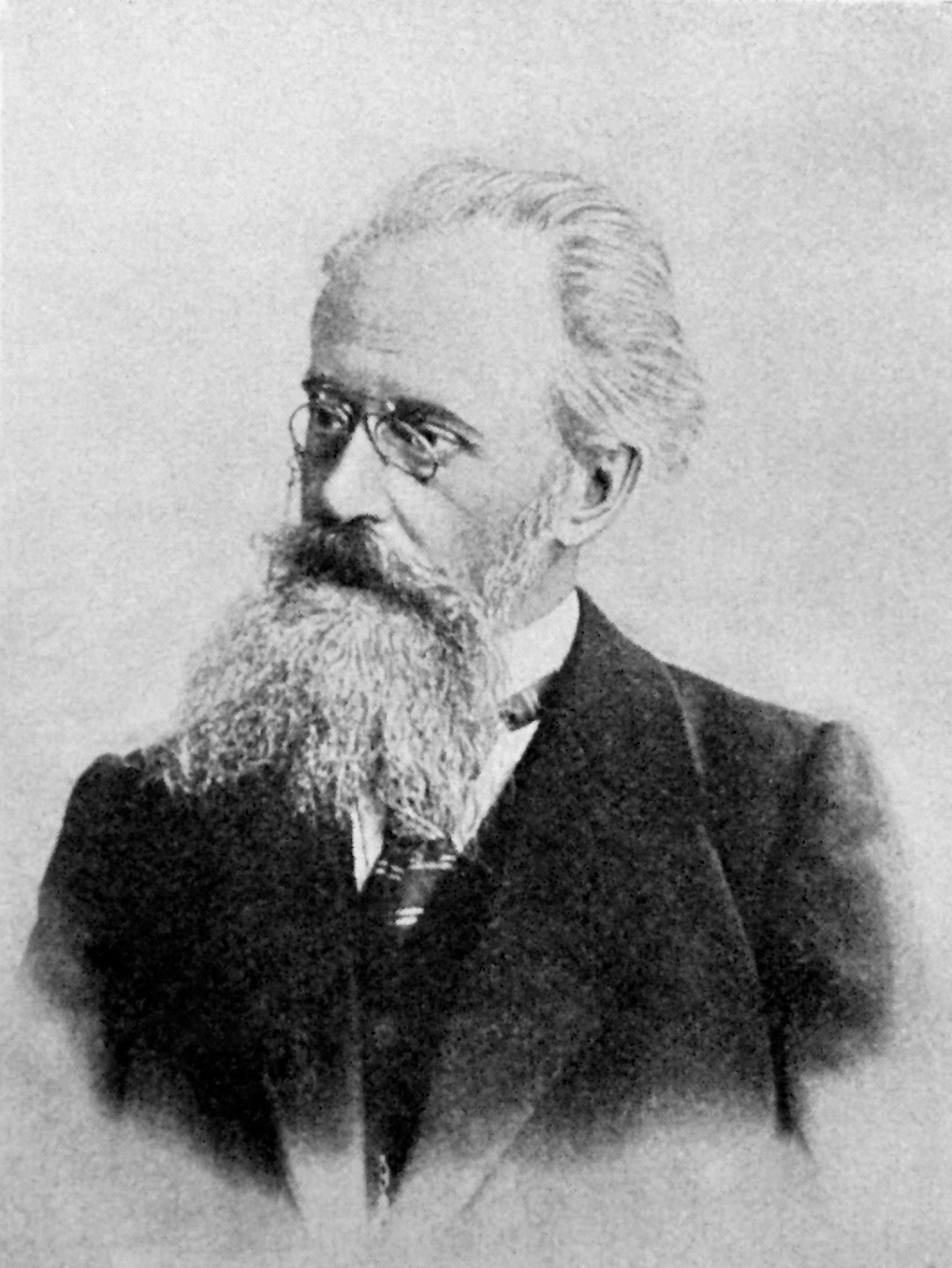
- Born: Nikolay Konstantinovich Mikhaylovsky; 27 November 1842; Meshchovsk, Russian Empire
- Died: 10 February 1904 (aged 61); Saint Petersburg, Russian Empire
- Occupations: Literary critic, sociologist, writer

Nikolay Konstantinovich Mikhaylovsky (Russian: Никола́й Константи́нович Михайло́вский; 27 November [O.S. 15 November] 1842 – 10 February [O.S. 28 January] 1904) was a Russian literary critic, sociologist, writer on public affairs, and one of the theoreticians of the Narodniki movement.

== Biography ==
The school of thinkers he belonged to became famous in the Russian Empire in the 1870s and 1880s as exponents of political and economic reforms. He contributed to Otechestvennye Zapiski from 1869 until its suppression in 1884. He became co-editor of Severny Vestnik in 1873, and from 1890 until his death in 1904 served as co-editor of Russkoye Bogatstvo ("Russian Treasure") with Vladimir Korolenko. His collected writings were published in 1913.

== Thought ==
=== Social philosophy ===
In his works, Mikhaylovsky developed the idea of the relationship between the hero and the masses (crowd). Contrary to the ideas popular among revolutionary-minded people of the late 19th-early 20th centuries that an individual having strong character or talent is able to fulfil incredible things and even change of the course of history, in the articles "Heroes and Crowd" (1882) and others, Mikhaylovsky presents a new theory and shows that an individual does not necessarily mean an outstanding individual, but any individual who by chance finds himself within certain circumstances in the lead or just ahead of the crowd. Mikhaylovsky emphasizes that at definite moments an individual can give substantial strength to a crowd (through his emotions and actions), and so the whole event can acquire a special power. Thus, the role of an individual depends on its psychological influence is reinforced by mass perception.

Mikhaylovsky was one of the radical thinkers who were 'acutely conscious of their wealth and privilege', as the psychological inspiration of the revolution was guilt, writing: 'We have come to realise that our awareness of the universal truth could only have been reached at the cost of the age-old suffering of the people. We are the people's debtors and this debt weighs down on our conscience.'

Mikhaylovsky regarded the historical process as a progression of social environment differentiation, eventually leading to the emergence of individuality. The struggle for individuality was seen as a matter of environment adapting to personality, in contrast to the Darwinist notion of struggle for existence, in which an individual adapts to the environment. Criticizing Darwinists for the transference of biological laws onto societal development, Mikhailovsky thought it necessary to expand Darwinism with 1) Karl Ernst von Baer's law, in compliance with which organisms develop from the simple to the complex, and 2) the solidarity principle, at the base of which lies simple cooperation. Mikhaylovsky saw the utmost criterion of social progress in obtaining the ideal of a perfect, harmoniously developed person. If simple cooperation is a social union of equals with similar interests and functions and "solidarity" as the main attribute of the society in question, in the case of complex cooperation there exists a highly developed division of labor whose major attribute is the "struggle" of interrelated groups. In his view, a society might reach an advanced stage of development and yet belong to the lower type of organization, as, for instance, was the case with European capitalism based on division of labor and complex cooperation. Hence Mikhaylovsky concluded that peasant Russia lagged behind the capitalist West according to the stage of development, but surpassed it if judged by the type of organization. Furthermore, like the majority of nineteenth-century Russian thinkers, he attached particular significance to the obshchina (traditional peasant community), a unique trait distinguishing Russia from other countries.

== See also ==
- Two-stage theory
