= Ivane Gomarteli =

Georgian physician (1875–1938)

- ივანე გომართელი
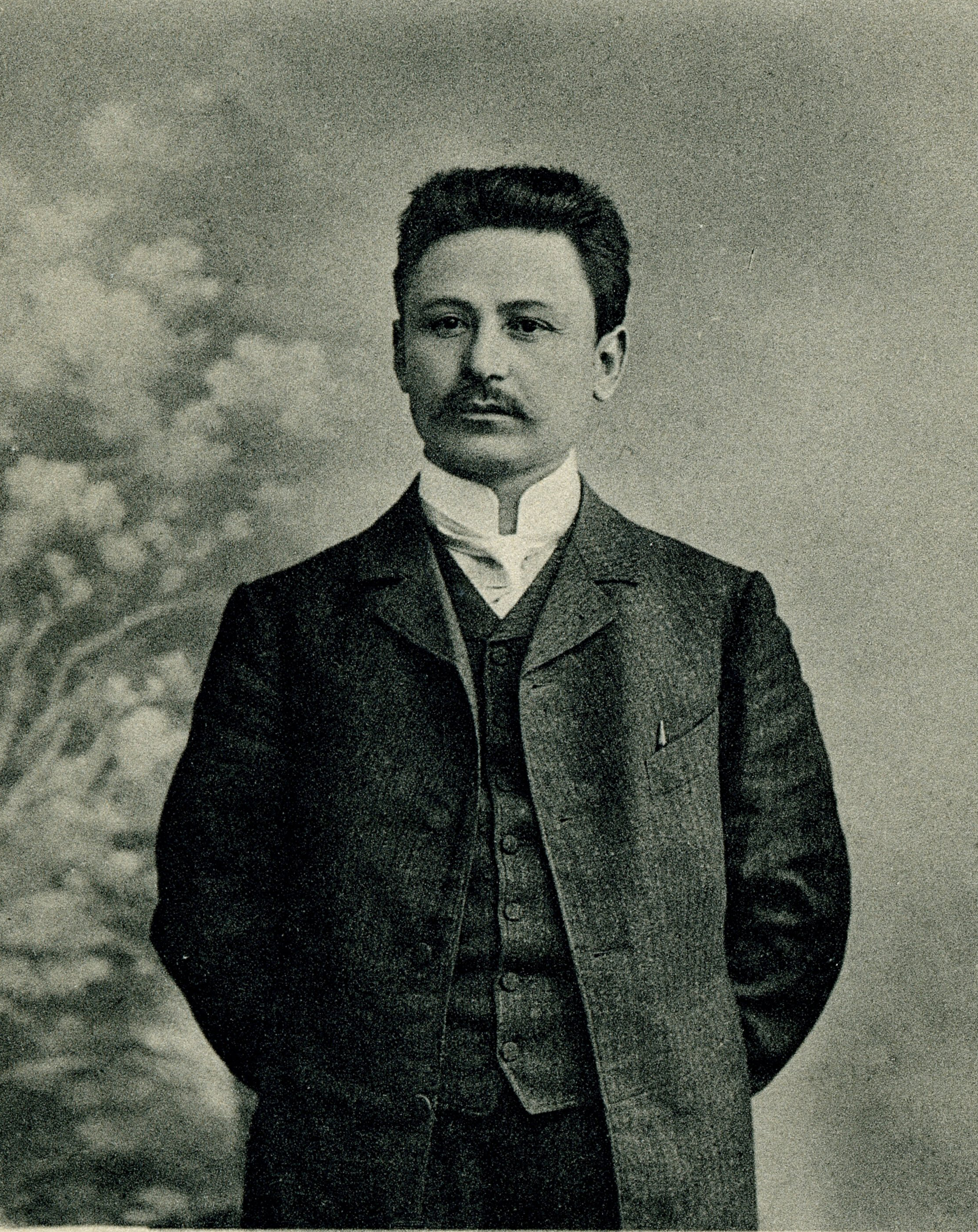
- Photographic portrait (1906)
- Born: October 2, 1875; Village of Gorisa
- Died: April 19, 1938 (aged 62)
- Education: Moscow University
- Occupations: Physician, political figure

Ivane Gomarteli (Georgian: ივანე გომართელი) (October 2, 1875 – April 19, 1938) was a Georgian physician, political figure, and author involved in the social-democratic movement early in the 20th century.

== Life ==
Gomarteli was born in the village of Gorisa in the western Georgian province of Imereti, then part of the Kutais Governorate of the Russian Empire. After graduating from the Medical Faculty of Moscow University in 1899, Gomarteli practiced medicine in his homeland. Around the same time he joined the Russian Social-Democratic Labour Party and later adhered to its Menshevik wing. He regularly published medical articles, political commentary and literary criticism in the Georgian press and authored prose fiction. In 1906, he was elected to the 1st State Duma of the Russian Empire, representing the Kutais Governorate. When the Duma was dissolved, Gomarteli was imprisoned for three months for signing the Vyborg Manifesto. In 1907, he moved to work in Tiflis. By 1913, he had distanced himself from the Mensheviks, criticizing their subservience to the Russian Social Democratic Party on the national question and, like the fellow Menshevik journalist Vladimir Darchiashvili, supported the idea of territorial autonomy for Georgia.

After Georgia became independent following the Russian Revolution of 1917, Gomarteli was elected to the Georgian National Council and then to the Constituent Assembly of Georgia. After the Soviet takeover of Georgia in 1921, he retired from politics. Most of his work thereafter was as a physician and literary critic. He is buried at the Vake cemetery in Tbilisi.
