= Sachkhere =

Sachkhere საჩხერე
- Town
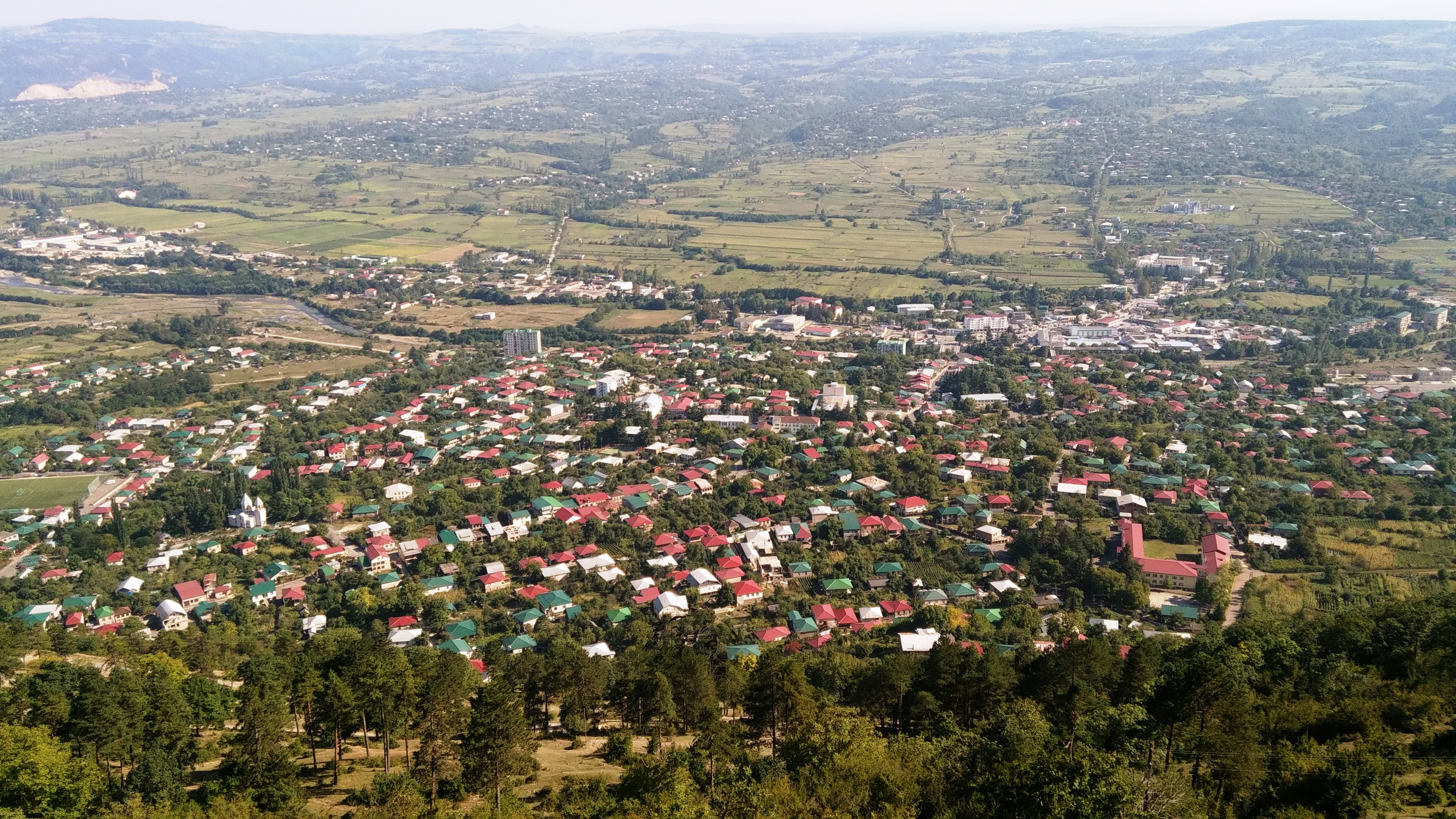
- Sachkhere from Modinakhe fortress
- Interactive map of Sachkhere
- Location within Georgia Location within Imereti
- Coordinates: 42°20′20″N 43°24′14″E
- Country: Georgia
- Region: Imereti
- Municipality: Sachkhere
- Elevation: 500 m (1,600 ft)

Population (2024)
  - Total: 5,329
- Time zone: UTC+4 (Georgian Time)
- Area code: +995 435

Sachkhere (Georgian: საჩხერე [s̪ät͡ʃʰχe̞ɾe̞]) is a town at the northern edge of the Imereti Province in Western Georgia. It is the center of the Sachkhere Municipality.

Farming is a major contributor to the economy of Sachkhere. Alva LLC estimates that there are 4,000 small and medium-sized farms and ranches in the region, supported by a program of technical assistance sponsored by USAID and administered by the Farmer-to-Farmer program of CNFA.

== History ==
From the end of the 15th century, much land in the region was owned by the noble Tsereteli family.

By the 19th century, Sachkhere had become a very diverse settlement with a sizable community of Georgian Jews. According to official statistics published by the administration of the viceroy, in 1880 the total population of 1,034 people was composed of the following religious groups: 628 Georgian Jews, 206 Orthodox Christians (presumably mostly Georgians), and 200 Gregorian Armenians.

Some Georgian Jews had moved to Sachkhere from the city of Kutaisi. Prior to the end of serfdom implemented in Kutaisi Governorate from 1865 as part of the Russian Empire's Emancipation reform (1861), many Sachkhere Jews had been serfs on the lands of the Tsereteli family.

In 1878, 9 Georgian Jews were arrested in Sachkhere for the alleged killing of a Christian girl from the neighbouring village of Perevisa in Shorapani uezd. A classic case of blood libel, they were falsely accused of abducting the girl and extracting her blood for purportedly Jewish religious rituals. In March 1879, the case was heard at the Kutaisi Circuit Court, which had been established in early 1868 as one of several new courts in the South Caucasus created by Tsar Alexander II.'s Judicial Reform. During the trial, the defence lawyers Petr Aleksandrov, Lev Kupernik and Moisei Kikodze convinced the judges that the accusations against the Jewish men were mostly based on false testimony. All of the accused were acquitted. The previous year Aleksandrov had already defended the Russian revolutionary Vera Zasulich at a highly publicised jury trial in St Petersburg, which had also resulted in an acquittal.

== Science ==
The microbiologist George Eliava (1892–1937) was born in Sachkhere.

== Sport ==
Though small, Sachkhere is famous for having produced two Olympic weightlifting champions - Lasha Talakhadze and Giorgi Asanidze.

== Climate ==
Climate data for Sachkere (1991–2020)
Month	Jan	Feb	Mar	Apr	May	Jun	Jul	Aug	Sep	Oct	Nov	Dec	Year
Record high °C (°F)	20.0 (68.0)	21.6 (70.9)	26.0 (78.8)	33.5 (92.3)	39.5 (103.1)	38.5 (101.3)	41.9 (107.4)	41.5 (106.7)	39.0 (102.2)	35.0 (95.0)	29.5 (85.1)	23.0 (73.4)	41.9 (107.4)
Mean daily maximum °C (°F)	7.3 (45.1)	9.1 (48.4)	13.1 (55.6)	18.6 (65.5)	23.2 (73.8)	26.7 (80.1)	29.5 (85.1)	30.8 (87.4)	26.5 (79.7)	20.9 (69.6)	14.4 (57.9)	8.9 (48.0)	19.1 (66.4)
Mean daily minimum °C (°F)	−2.0 (28.4)	−1.6 (29.1)	2.2 (36.0)	6.4 (43.5)	11.6 (52.9)	15.5 (59.9)	18.5 (65.3)	18.4 (65.1)	14.0 (57.2)	8.3 (46.9)	2.6 (36.7)	−0.9 (30.4)	7.8 (46.0)
Record low °C (°F)	−17.0 (1.4)	−16.8 (1.8)	−9.5 (14.9)	−5.7 (21.7)	0.2 (32.4)	2.3 (36.1)	8.3 (46.9)	9.5 (49.1)	1.8 (35.2)	−3.2 (26.2)	−9.5 (14.9)	−20.0 (−4.0)	−20.0 (−4.0)
Average precipitation mm (inches)	74.7 (2.94)	68.3 (2.69)	84.0 (3.31)	80.8 (3.18)	91.7 (3.61)	94.1 (3.70)	74.2 (2.92)	67.5 (2.66)	82.0 (3.23)	103.4 (4.07)	86.2 (3.39)	83.9 (3.30)	990.8 (39.01)
Average precipitation days (≥ 1.0 mm)	10.5	10.1	12.2	11.1	11.9	11.9	10.6	7.5	8.6	9.8	9.7	10.1	124.0
Source: NOAA

== See also ==
- Sachkhere Mountain Training School
- Imereti
