= Abram Gots =

Russian revolutionary (1882–1940)

- Абра́м Гоц
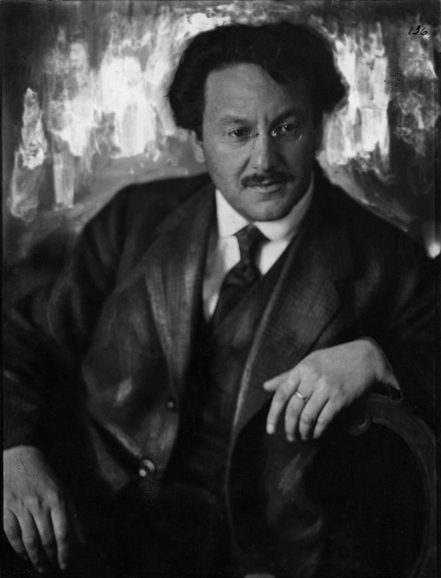
- Gots around the time of the Trial of the Socialist Revolutionaries, 1922

Member of the Russian Constituent Assembly
- In office 25 November 1917 – 20 January 1918
- Preceded by: Constituency established
- Succeeded by: Constituency abolished
- Constituency: Penza

Personal details
- Born: 1882 Moscow, Russia
- Died: August 4, 1940 (aged 57–58) Nizhny Ingash, Soviet Union
- Party: Socialist-Revolutionary Party
- Relatives: Mikhail Gots (brother)

Abram Rafailovich Gots (Russian: Абра́м Рафаи́лович Гоц; 1882 – 4 August 1940) was a Russian Socialist-Revolutionary leader, active in the Revolutions of 1905 and 1917.

== Biography ==
=== Early years ===
Abram Gots came from a wealthy Jewish family in Moscow. His older brother was Mikhail Gots (1866–1906), a revolutionary active in the populist ('narodnik') movement and instrumental in organising the Socialist-Revolutionary Party (PSR). Abram Gots studied at various universities in Germany, becoming one of the 'Heidelberg SRs', like his friends Nikolai Avksentiev, Vladimir Zenzinov, Vadim Rudnev and Ilya Fondaminsky. These SRs were influenced by Marxism and Neo-Kantian philosophy as well as by the older Russian populist tradition. (That was also true of Victor Chernov, the party's chief theoretician.)

=== Political activity ===
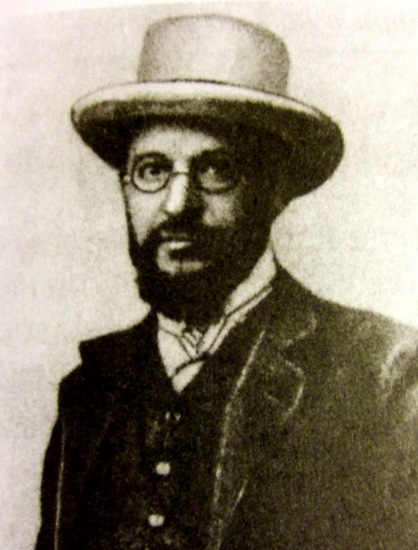
Gots c. 1900s

Gots participated in the Russian Revolution of 1905 and for a time served in the Combat Organisation of the PSR, which was responsible for acts of `political terror' and 'expropriations'. In 1906, Abram's brother Mikhail died. In 1907, Gots was arrested and sentenced to hard labour in Siberia. He was in Siberia when World War I broke out and initially joined the anti-war, 'Internationalist' faction of the PSR and participated in the Siberian Zimmerwaldists. Freed by the February Revolution of 1917, he returned to Petrograd and became a leading member of the Petrograd soviet. He also served as chairman of the All-Russian Central Executive Committee, which was elected by the First All-Russian Congress of Soviets of Workers’ and Soldiers’ Deputies in June 1917. He now supported a 'Revolutionary Defencist' position, supporting war in defence of the revolution but not for imperialistic aims. This brought him closer to the right wing of the PSR and led him into conflict with the SR 'Internationalists' around Chernov and Mark Natanson. Gots also collaborated with Menshevik leaders in the soviet, particularly Fyodor Dan, Mikhail Liber and Irakli Tsereteli.

Gots opposed the October Revolution and tried to organize armed resistance to the Bolsheviks. He was a member of the anti-Bolshevik 'Committee for the Salvation of the Homeland and Revolution'. When Admiral Kolchak overthrew the coalition 'Directorate', Gots sided with those SRs who suspended military action against the Bolsheviks, for fear of aiding the anti-democratic counter-revolution.

=== Trial of the Socialist Revolutionaries ===
In 1920, Gots and 33 other SR leaders were arrested. He was the main defendant at the 1922 Moscow Trial of Socialist Revolutionaries, sometimes described as the first 'show trial' in Soviet Russia. The trial became a cause celèbre among Western socialists. Theodor Liebknecht, brother of the assassinated German Spartacist leader Karl, acted as a lawyer for the defense; the venerable anarchist Peter Kropotkin appealed personally to Vladimir Lenin to spare the lives of the defendants, Karl Kautsky wrote impassioned pamphlets about the trial and American trade unionists demonstrated for the release of the SRs. The Bolsheviks countered with massive demonstrations and courtroom disruptions demanding the death penalty. In the end, Gots and eleven of his co-defendants were sentenced to death, but the sentences were suspended and the SRs were kept as 'hostages'.

=== Later years ===
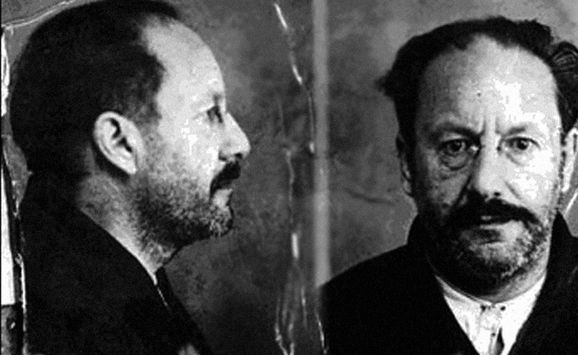
Gots's prison mugshot, 1937

After a period of imprisonment Gots was deported to Alma-Ata, where he worked in industry. He was re-arrested there during the Great Terror of 1937. On June 20, 1939, the Military Collegium of the Supreme Soviet sentenced Gots to a term of 25 years of deprivation of freedom. Gots would not survive this term, dying under the harsh conditions of the Gulag in 1940.

== Bibliography ==
- The Great Soviet Encyclopedia. Moscow, 1979.
- Shukman, H. (ed.), The Blackwell Encyclopedia of the Russian Revolution. Oxford, 1988.
- W. Woitinsky, The Twelve Who are to Die: The Trial of the Social Revolutionists in Moscow. Berlin: Delegation of the Party of Social-Revolutionists, 1922.
