= ACDI/VOCA =

International development nonprofit organization based in Washington, DC, USA

- Founded: May 12, 1963; 63 years ago
- Tax ID no.: 52-0811461
- Legal status: 501(c)(3) nonprofit organization
- Headquarters: Washington, D.C., United States
- Coordinates: 38.8969206°N 77.0103424°W
- Methods: Catalyzing investment, climate smart agriculture, empowerment & resilience, institutional strengthening, market systems
- Chair: Deborah Atwood
- President, Chief Executive Officer: Charles “CJ” Hall
- Subsidiaries: Tanager(USA), MCA Bai Tushum (Kyrgyzstan), KMF Demeu (Kazakhstan), Sakhalin Small Enterprise Development Foundation (Russia), Frontiers (Kyrgyzstan), Kredaqro (Azerbaijan)
- Revenue: $135,227,229 (2017)
- Expenses: $134,695,815 (2013)
- Employees: 1,270 (2017)
- Volunteers: 200-300 (2017)
- Website: www.acdivoca.org

ACDI/VOCA is an international development nonprofit organization based in Washington, D.C., United States, that fosters broad-based economic growth, increased living standards, and community development. Incorporated in 1965, ACDI/VOCA's mission is to promote economic opportunities for cooperatives, enterprises and communities through the innovative application of sound business practice. ACDI/VOCA has worked in 148 countries since 1963. Total revenues for ACDI/VOCA and its affiliates are approximately $154 million. ACDI/VOCA employs approximately 1,270 people in the US and overseas.

== History ==
Agricultural Cooperative Development International

ACDI (Agricultural Cooperative Development International) was formed in 1966 by major U.S. farm cooperatives. Its principal objective was to provide expertise and support to cooperative enterprises in developing countries.

In 1967, ACDI helped found Indian Farmers Fertiliser Cooperative (IFFCO), India's largest fertilizer company, re-established cooperative banking in Poland, and set up large business-oriented farmer organizations in East Africa, including the cooperative unions in Sidama and Yirgachefe, Ethiopia, that enabled direct export of coffee from those regions. IFFCO is still a member of ACDI.

Volunteers in Overseas Cooperative Assistance

VOCA (Volunteers in Overseas Cooperative Assistance) was established in 1970 to provide volunteer assistance in developing countries. In 1985 VOCA was the first implementer of the USAID-funded Farmer-to-Farmer program. Volunteers have included bank presidents, coffee roasters, grain storage specialists and business magnates. After the fall of the Soviet Union, a substantial number of assignments were carried out in Central and Eastern Europe and the Newly Independent States, in many cases providing entrepreneurs there with exposure to the dynamics of the private sector and modern commercial operations.

In 1997 the two organizations merged to form ACDI/VOCA. The merger combined ACDI's long-term development approaches and VOCA's people-to-people volunteer activities. Formerly the acronym stood for the combination of the two entities (Agricultural Cooperative Development International/Volunteers in Overseas Cooperative Assistance), but today its legal name is solely the acronym. The organization's programming currently revolves around value chain approaches to enterprise development, self-sustaining financial services development, farmer organization, agribusiness development, self-help community development, and food aid, among other competencies. The organization sends hundreds of U.S. volunteer experts overseas each year on short-term assignments.

== Focus areas ==
ACDI/VOCA works in five main areas:

- Catalyzing investment
- Climate-smart agriculture
- Empowerment & resilience
- Institutional strengthening
- Market systems

== Funding ==
ACDI/VOCA receives funding from various donors, including United States Agency for International Development, United States Department of Agriculture, Millennium Challenge Corporation, Department for International Development, United States African Development Foundation (USADF), the World Bank, United Nations Development Programme, the European Bank for Reconstruction and Development, the Asian Development Bank, African Union Commission, Swedish International Development Cooperation Agency (SIDA), Bill & Melinda Gates Foundation, and other development funders. ACDI/VOCA also partners with private sector corporations.
