= Modinakhe fortress =

Ruined Georgian fortress in Sachkhere, Georgia

- მოდინახე ციხე
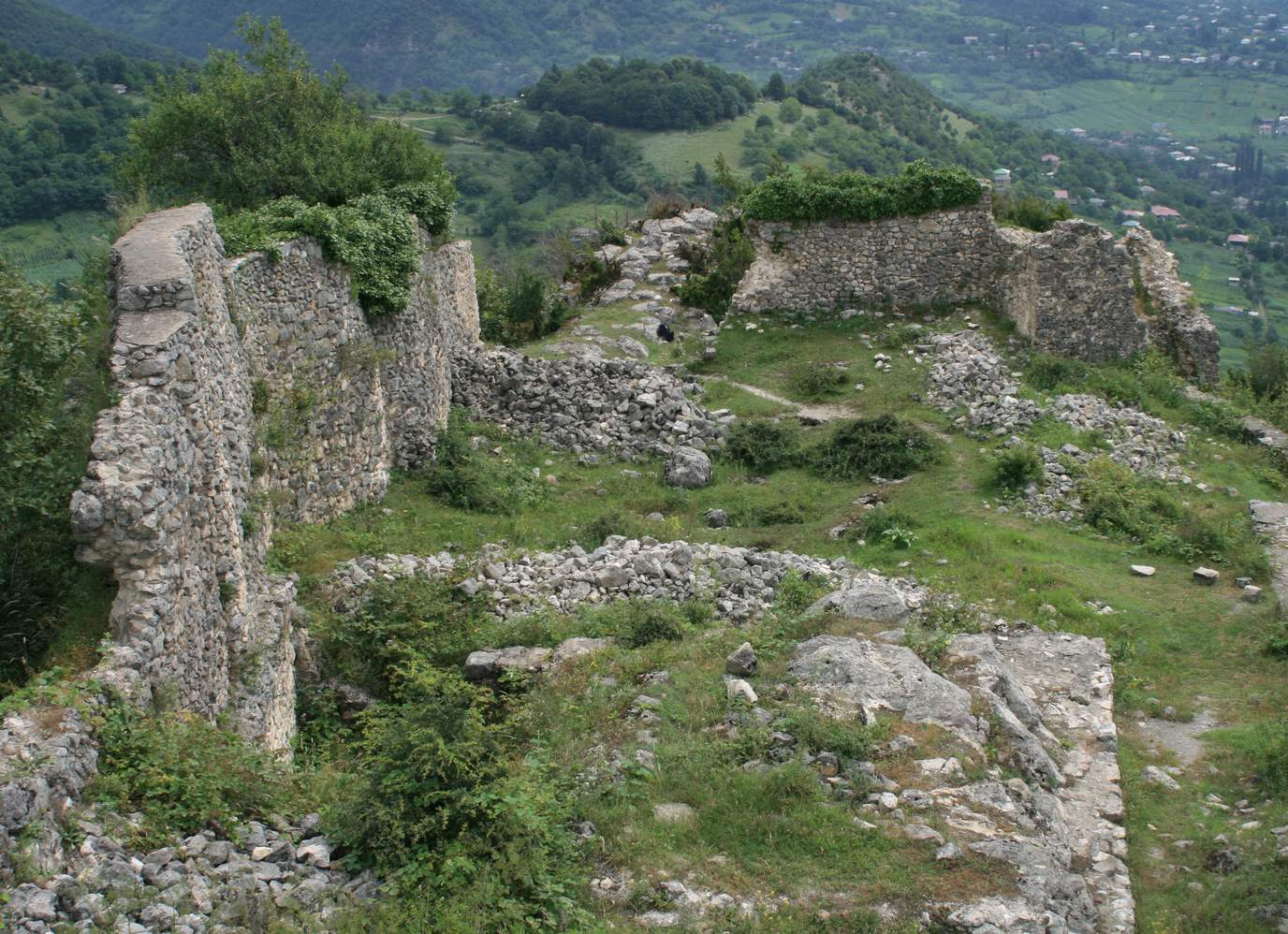
- Modinakhe fortress

- Location within Imereti Location within Georgia
- Interactive map of Modinakhe fortress
- Location: Sachkhere, Sachkhere Municipality, Imereti, Georgia
- Coordinates: 42°20′56″N 43°24′08″E
- Type: Cyclopean fortress

Modinakhe (Georgian: მოდინახე, romanized: modinakhe [mo̞d̪in̪äχe̞]) is a Georgian fortress located high on the mountain in the city of Sachkhere in Imereti, Georgia. It is currently in ruins.

== History ==
The exact date of its construction is unknown. For a long time, the Modinahe fortress served as a residence for the princes Tsereteli, until it was captured by the Russian army in 1810 in the course of Russian conquest of the Caucasus. After that, it was abandoned, and in 1991 it was badly damaged by an earthquake, today there is large debris off the walls in the lower part of the mountain. The fortress is interesting as an observation platform and as a historical place.

Fortress name "Modi-nakhe", which means "to go and see", corresponds to the impregnable position of the castle, to which the enemy stands and looks at Modinahe (Ibn Arabshah mentioned a certain fortress in Georgia, called "Come, look, returns").

== Literature ==
- Nadiradze J., Archaeological monuments of the Kvirili Gorge, Tb., 1975;
- Soselia O., From the History of Feudal Georgia to Western Georgia, Tb., 1966;
- Beradze T., Nadiradze J., The Georgian Soviet Encyclopedia, vol. 7, p. 61, Tb., 1984.
