= Giorgi Tsereteli =

Giorgi Tsereteli may refer to:

- Giorgi Tsereteli (orientalist) (1904–1973), Georgian orientalist
- Giorgi Tsereteli (writer) (1842–1900), Georgian writer
- Gigi Tsereteli (born 1964), Georgian politician
