= Irakli Tsereteli =

Georgian politician (1881–1959)

- ირაკლი წერეთელი Ираклий Церетели
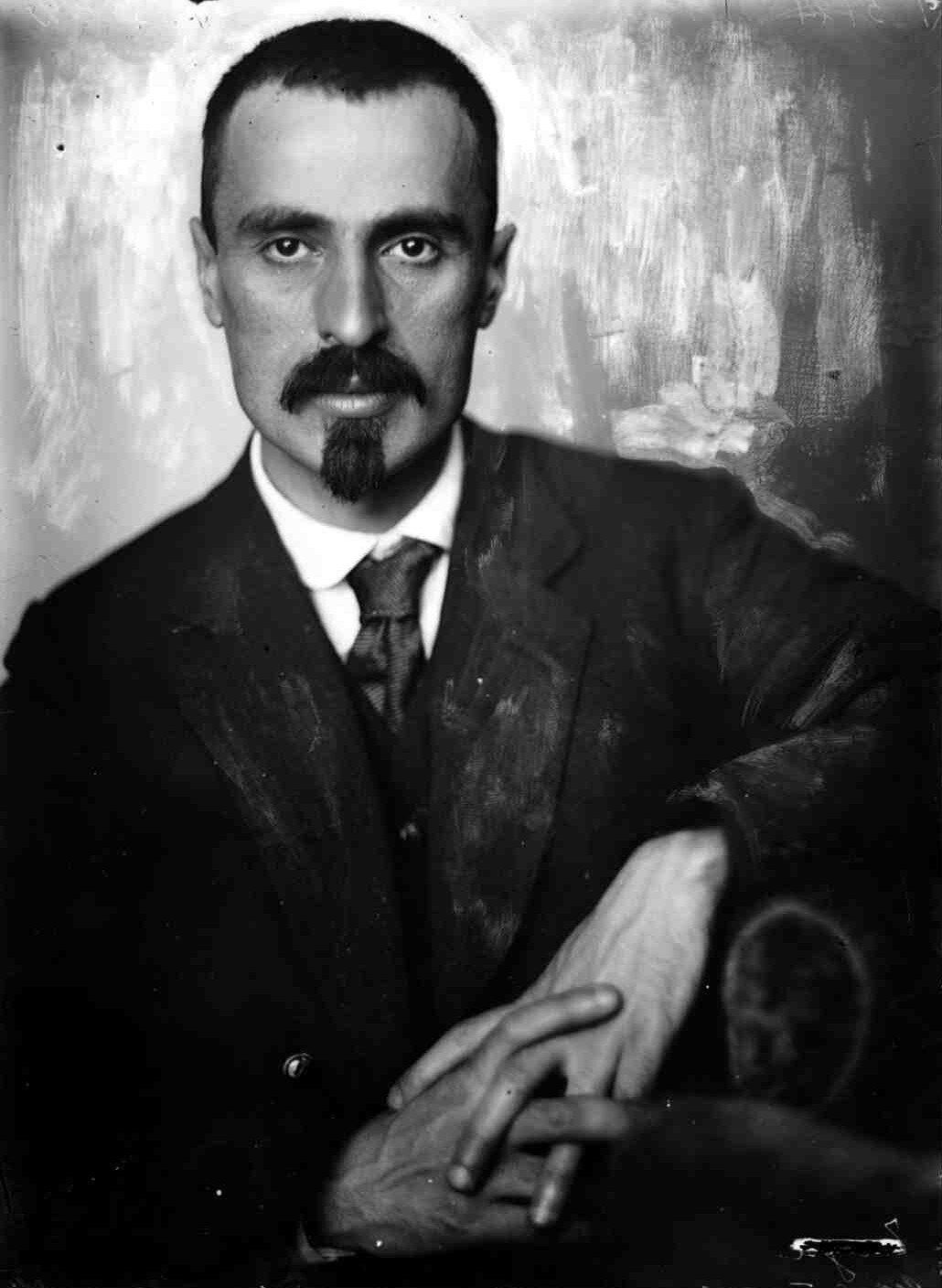
- Tsereteli in 1917

Minister of the Interior of the Russian Provisional Government
- In office 23 July 1917 – 6 August 1917
- Prime Minister: Alexander Kerensky
- Preceded by: Georgy Lvov
- Succeeded by: Nikolai Avksentiev

Minister of Post and Telegraph of the Russian Provisional Government
- In office 5 May 1917 – 25 July 1917
- Prime Minister: Georgy Lvov
- Preceded by: Position established
- Succeeded by: Alexei Nikitin

Member of the Russian Constituent Assembly
- In office 25 November 1917 – 20 January 1918 (Note: The Constituent Assembly was declared dissolved by the Bolshevik-Left SR Soviet government, rendering the end the term served.)
- Preceded by: Constituency established
- Succeeded by: Constituency abolished
- Constituency: Transcaucasus

Member of the Russian State Duma
- In office 20 February 1907 – 1 November 1907
- Preceded by: Multi-member district
- Succeeded by: Multi-member district
- Constituency: Kutais Governorate

Personal details
- Born: Irakli Giorgis dze Tsereteli; 2 December 1881 Gorisa, Kutais Governorate, Russian Empire
- Died: 20 May 1959 (aged 77) New York City, U.S.
- Resting place: Leuville Cemetery; Paris, France
- Party: Russian Social Democratic Labour Party (Mensheviks); Social Democratic Party of Georgia

Irakli Tsereteli (Note: Georgian: ირაკლი გიორგის ძე წერეთელი, Irakli Giorgis dze Tsereteli Russian: Ираклий Георгиевич Церетели, Irakliy Georgievich Tsereteli) (2 December [O.S. 20 November] 1881 – 20 May 1959) was a Georgian politician and a leading spokesman of the Social Democratic Party of Georgia and later Russian Social Democratic Labour Party (RSDLP) during the era of the Russian Revolutions.

Tsereteli was born and raised in Georgia when it was part of the Russian Empire. A member of the Menshevik faction of the RSDLP, Tsereteli was elected to the Duma in 1907, where he gained fame for his oratorical skill. Shortly after entering the Duma, Tsereteli was arrested and charged with conspiracy to overthrow the Tsarist government, and exiled to Siberia. A dedicated Social Democrat who believed in the Menshevik ideology, Tsereteli was one of the leading figures of the movement in Russia. In 1915, during his Siberian exile, Tsereteli formed what would become known as Siberian Zimmerwaldism, which advocated for the role of the Second International in ending the war. He also developed the idea of "Revolutionary Defensism", the concept of a defensive war which only allowed for the defence of territory, and argued it was not being utilized.

Returning to the government in the aftermath of the 1917 February Revolution, he took up a leading position in the Petrograd Soviet and accepted a position in the Russian Provisional Government as Minister of Post and Telegraph, and briefly as Minister of the Interior. Concerned that political fragmentation would lead to a civil war in Russia, Tsereteli strived to broker compromises between the various leftist factions in the Russian Revolution and was the force behind efforts to work together with the middle classes, to no avail. Renowned for his speaking ability, Tsereteli gained appreciation for his ability in this regard, giving impassioned speeches in the Duma and in the Petrograd Soviet.

After the Bolsheviks seized power of the Russian government during the October Revolution, Tsereteli returned to Georgia. He worked as a diplomat at the Paris Peace Conference, where he lobbied for international recognition and assistance for the newly independent Democratic Republic of Georgia; meaningful assistance largely failed to materialize before the Bolshevik-led Red Army invaded in 1921. An avowed internationalist, Tsereteli grew increasingly distant from the Georgian Mensheviks who gradually adopted more nationalist tendencies. He spent the rest of his life in exile, mainly in France, working with socialist organisations and writing on socialism, and died in New York City in 1959.

== Early life ==
=== Early years and education ===
Tsereteli was born on 2 December [O.S. 20 November] 1881 in Gorisa, Kutais Governorate, in the Russian Empire (now in Imereti, Georgia), to a Georgian Orthodox Christian family, the third child of Giorgi Tsereteli, a radical writer from the noble Tsereteli family, and Olympiada Nikoladze, the sister of the journalist Niko Nikoladze. Tsereteli had one sister, Eliko, and brother, Levan. Both Giorgi and Niko were members of the meore dasi (მეორე დასი; Georgian for "second group"), a group of Georgian populists and socialists, and they greatly influenced Irakli's outlook. Tsereteli grew up in nearby Kutaisi and spent the summers at his family's estate in Gorisa; from a young age he noticed the inequality between his family and their servants and the local peasants, and desired to fix the imbalance.

When he was three, Tsereteli's mother died, so he and his siblings were sent to live with two aunts in Kutaisi, while Giorgi moved to Tiflis (now Tbilisi), the administrative centre of the Caucasus, occasionally visiting the children. Tsereteli would later move to Tiflis and attend a gymnasium. While there, he lived with his father who had since married Anastasia Tumanishvili, a Georgian writer and educator. Tsereteli's biographer W.H. Roobol suggests that due to Tsereteli's reserve towards Tumanova, Giorgi's influence over his son declined: "In any event, Giorgi Tsereteli was unable to imbue his son Irakli with his patriotic ideals." Nikoladze's views, which were more cautious against Georgian nationalism, also likely played a part in Tsereteli's shifting ideals. At the gymnasium Tsereteli distanced himself from Christianity, questioning death and its meaning, and was introduced to the writings of the British naturalist and biologist Charles Darwin, which also factored into his move away from religion. He completed his schooling in 1900, the same year as his father's death, and moved to Moscow to study law.

=== Entry into politics and arrests ===
Soon after arriving in Moscow, Tsereteli became embroiled in the student protests that broke out that year; how involved he initially was is unclear, with the only certainty being he was not yet a Marxist. It was during these protests that Tsereteli first gained fame as a speaker, and he eventually became a leading figure in the student movement. He was arrested in the spring of 1901 and after a brief detention was allowed to return to Georgia. Though he had been arrested, he was allowed to return to Moscow in the autumn of 1901 to write his exams. There had been relative quiet in the universities until that point, but it again erupted into protests; this time Tsereteli took a leading role, and was regarded as one of the most important figures of the Moscow student movement.

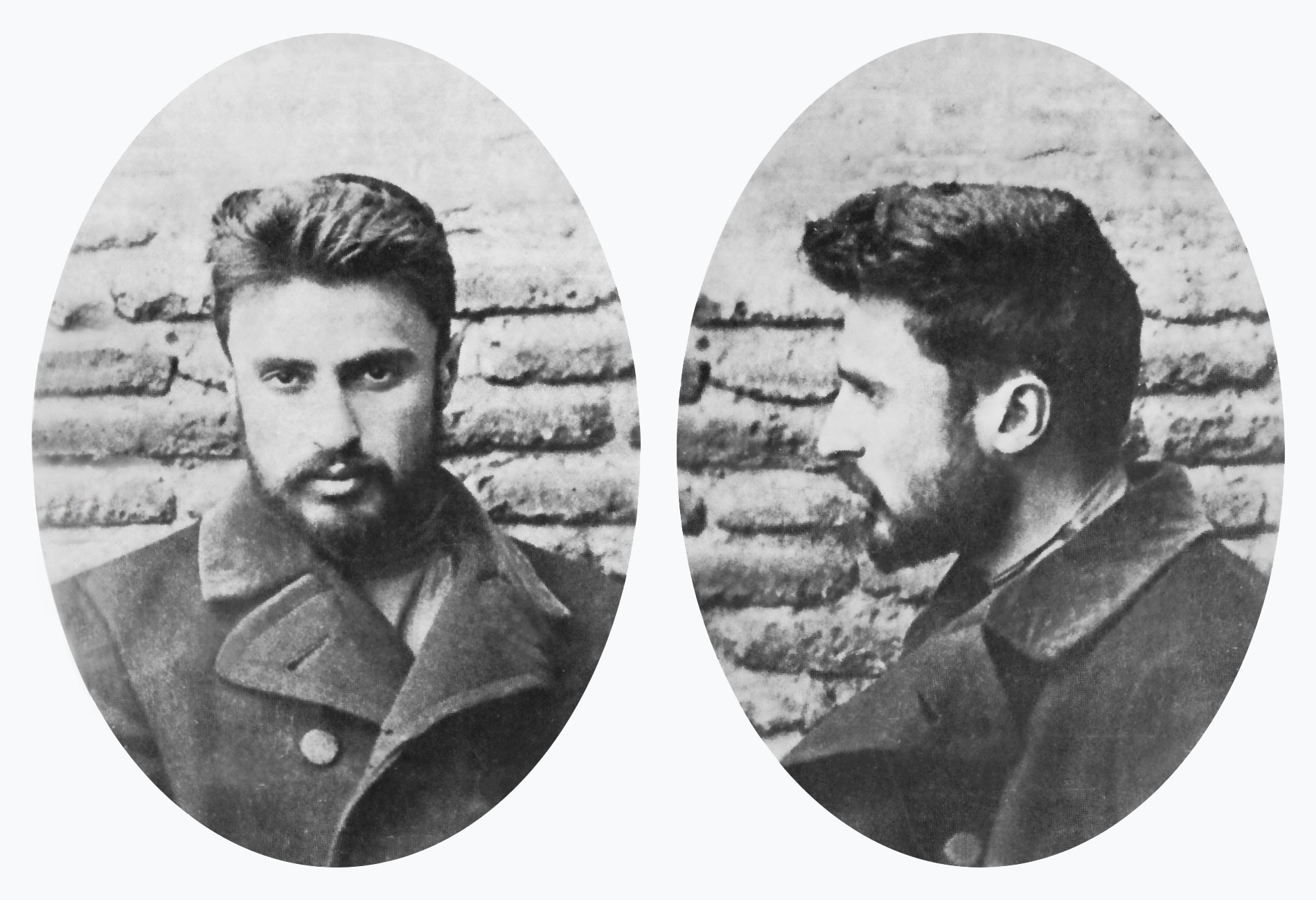
Photographs of Tsereteli taken in the Metekhi prison in Tiflis, 1904

At a meeting of student protesters on 9 February 1902 Tsereteli was arrested; considered one of the most radical leaders, he was one of two students given a sentence of five years' exile in Siberia, the longest sentence given to the protesting students. Though the government quickly backtracked and offered him the chance to serve it in Georgia, Tsereteli refused, seeing it as a pardon and considering "its acceptance as being in conflict with [his] views", as he explained in a letter. This refusal, which was publicised with other exiles, cited social democracy as advocated by the Russian Social Democratic Labour Party (RSDLP), and effectively confirmed Tsereteli's support for the ideology by this point. After declining the offer to return to Georgia, Tsereteli arrived in the village of Tulun in early 1902, located about 400 kilometres (250 mi) from Irkutsk, Siberia's administrative centre. However, by late summer he was permitted to move to Irkutsk. It was during this exile that Tsereteli became familiar with the Russian Social Democrats, particularly Marxism; Tsereteli read Vladimir Lenin's What Is To Be Done?, though he disliked the view Lenin espoused. Indeed, the RSDLP would split into two main factions in 1903 over factional differences.

On his release from exile Tsereteli returned to Georgia and aligned himself with the RSDLP's Georgian branch, later known as the Georgian Mensheviks, the minority faction within the party. He also began working as an editor for his father's former publication, Kvali (კვალი; Trace), writing most of their leading articles. However, in January 1904 he was again arrested, and spent two months in the Metekhi prison in Tiflis. Two months later Kvali was banned. Tsereteli was allowed to leave Georgia, likely due to the influence of his uncle, and he moved to Berlin to resume his law studies, spending 18 months in Europe. Suffering from a form of haemophilia, Tsereteli became seriously ill in the autumn of 1905, but was unable to quickly return home for rest as the 1905 Revolution broke out in the Russian Empire. It was only in May 1906 that he returned to Georgia.

=== Second Duma ===
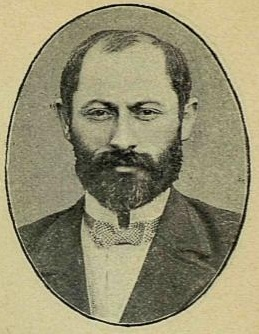
Noe Zhordania, like Tsereteli a Georgian Menshevik. Though the two disagreed on many topics, Zhordania encouraged Tsereteli to stand for election in 1907, later stating it was the "only time that Irakli ever listened to me."

Tsereteli remained in Georgia throughout the summer of 1906 recovering from his illness, and was not politically active. Even so, he was invited to stand as the Social Democratic candidate for the Russian legislative elections in January 1907, representing the Kutais Governorate, his home region. He was encouraged to do so by a fellow Georgian Menshevik, Noe Zhordania, with whom Tsereteli later became a political opponent, disagreeing on nearly every topic. Zhordania would later recall in his memoirs "that this was the only time that Irakli ever listened to me." All seven seats in Georgia were won by the Social Democrats.

Despite being the youngest member of the Imperial Duma—at 25, the minimum age required for membership—Tsereteli took a leading role. He immediately gained recognition as a great orator. In particular he was noted for three speeches in which he outlined the Social Democrats' views and heavily criticised the government. The first speech, which opened with him stating that the "government has fettered the nation in the chains of a state emergency, which imprisons its best sons, reduces the people to beggary and fritters away the pennies collected for the hungry and destitute. Today, there spoke to us the old feudal Russia, personified by the government." It went on to call for the opposition not to work with the government regarding the agrarian reforms of Prime Minister Pyotr Stolypin, stopping just short of calling for an armed insurrection.

The speech gained Tsereteli immediate respect among his peers. He strived to unite the opposition parties, though he faced considerable opposition both from the Kadets, a liberal group who had previously opposed the government but were now more amicable to them, and the Bolsheviks, the larger faction within the RSDLP, who worked to discredit the Mensheviks in the Duma. He sought out an alliance with the other leftist factions, namely the Socialist Revolutionary Party and the Trudoviks, a splinter group from the Socialist Revolutionaries. Stolypin grew increasingly tired of the opposition from the Social Democrats, and feared that his reforms would not be passed.

== Arrest and Siberian exile ==
=== Arrest ===
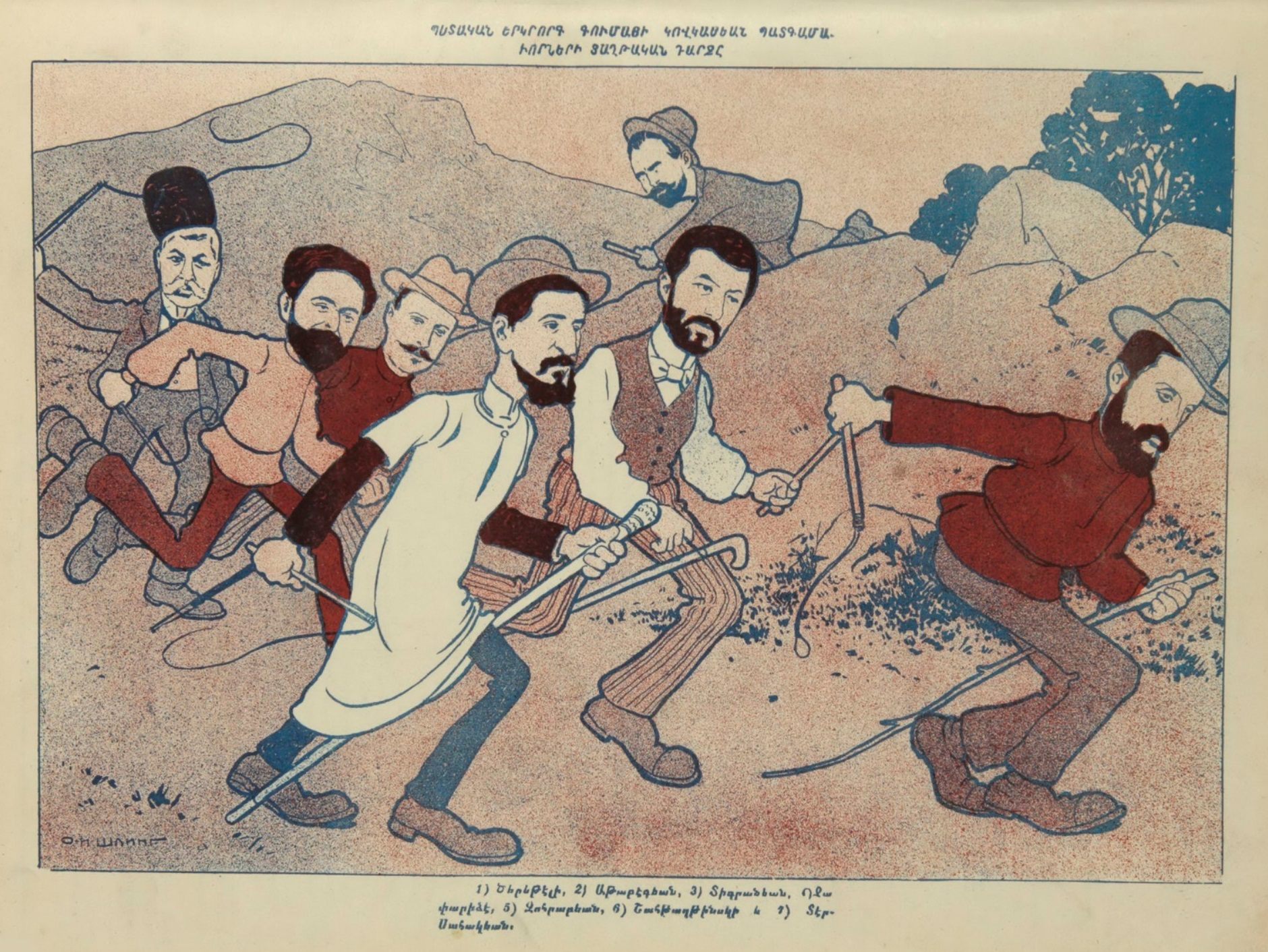
"The victorious return of the Caucasian deputies of the State Duma of the Second Convocation," cartoon from the Armenian satirical magazine Khatabala. Tsereteli is depicted third from left in the red shirt.

The Duma was dissolved on 2 June 1907 and shortly after midnight on 3 June the government arrested several of the Social Democrats, including Tsereteli. They were charged with trying to overthrow the government; this was a fabrication of the government that allowed Stolypin to have them expelled from the Duma, leaving it free to implement his policies. Tsereteli was convicted in November, and sentenced to five years' hard labour, though on account of his poor health it was commuted to time in prison. The first year of his prison term was spent in St. Petersburg, and in the winter of 1908–1909 Tsereteli was moved to Nikolayev in southern Ukraine; after four years in Nikolayev he was again moved, sent to the Alexandrovsky Central Prison in Irkutsk. In the autumn of 1913 Tsereteli was permitted to move to Usolye, a village about 70 kilometres (43 mi) from Irkutsk and easily accessible owing to its location on a branch line of the Trans-Siberian Railway.

Tsereteli would later reflect fondly on this period of exile: there were several other exiles in the region, and in the summers they would meet in Usolye, which had a favourable climate. On occasion Tsereteli was also able to visit Irkutsk, engaging in political talks. Both Bolsheviks and Mensheviks were involved in these discussions, and engaged with each other cordially, leading Tsereteli to believe the two factions could eventually reunite. This was in stark contrast to the situation outside Siberia, where the two factions had been increasingly distancing themselves.

=== Siberian Zimmerwaldism ===
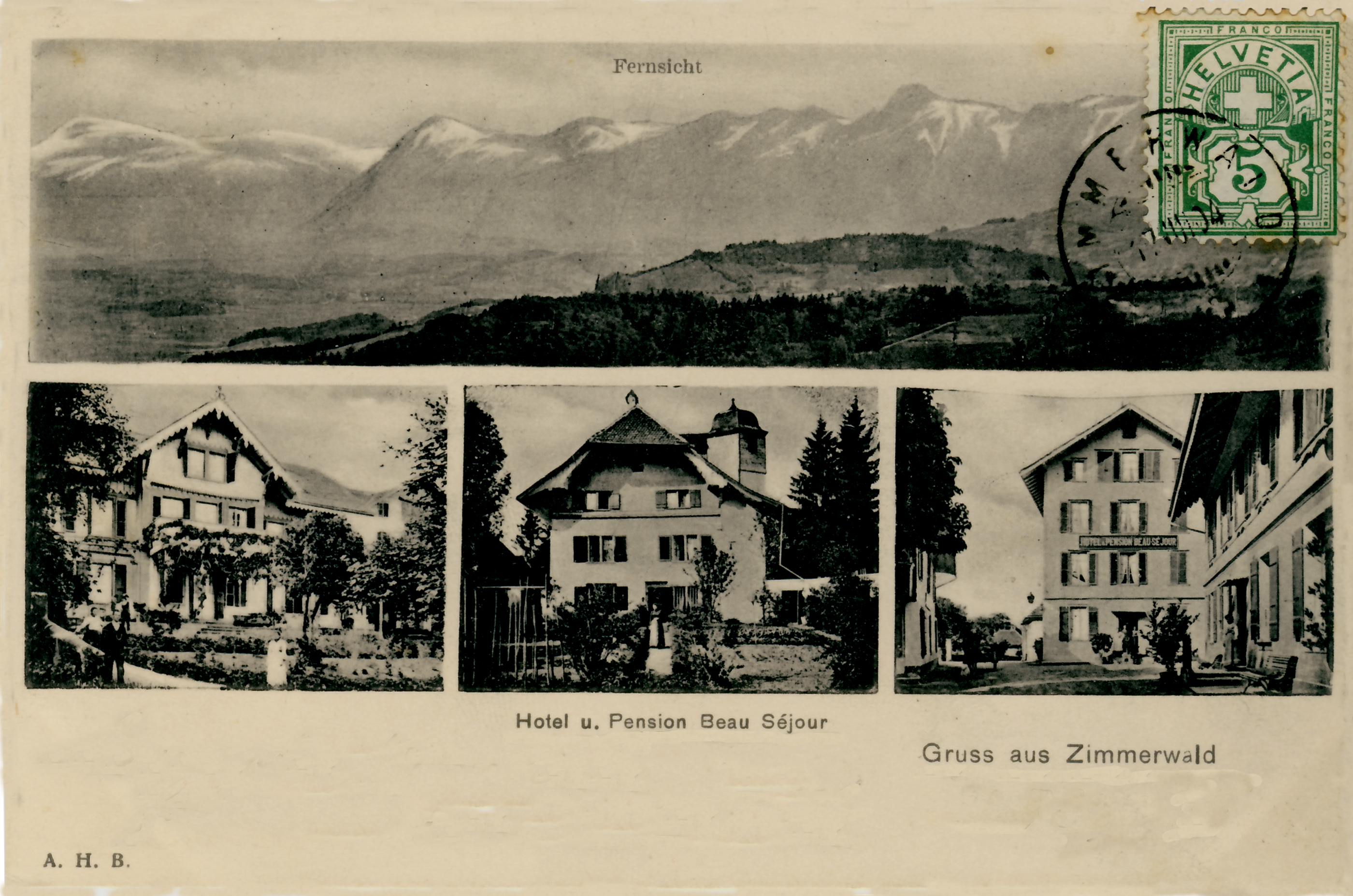
The Hotel Beau Séjour, site of the Zimmerwald conference, in 1904

The outbreak of the First World War in August 1914 was not of much interest to Tsereteli initially. However, much like the rest of the population in the region he regularly read updates in the newspapers, and tried to ascertain what type of opposition to the war was occurring internationally; though most mentions of opposition movements was censored, Tsereteli concluded that something had to exist, and felt that the Second International, a Paris-based organization of socialist and labour parties, could play some role in ending the war. Tsereteli also engaged in discussion with other Social Democrats in the Irkutsk region on his views towards the war; they would all publish their thoughts in journals, Tsereteli including his ideas in a journal that he edited, Siberian Journal (Сибирский Журнал, in Russian), later replaced by the Siberian Review (Сибирское Обозрение). This group would later be referred to as the Siberian Zimmerwaldists, a reference to the 1915 Zimmerwald Conference of international socialist groups.

At its root, Siberian Zimmerwaldism was based on the ideals of a branch of socialists who were opposed to the war and wanted to restore the Second International. The Second International had fractured upon the outbreak of the war as the various socialist groups differed on policy towards the war: many had abandoned the International in favour of defence of their countries (the so-called "Defensists"), while the "Minority" was split between the extreme left (led by Lenin), which advocated for class warfare, and the more mainstream view that sought to use the International; as such they were known as the "Internationalists". It was this latter group that the Siberian Zimmerwaldists were related to. Through his editorship of the journals, Tsereteli both became a mentor to other Siberian Zimmerwaldists and influenced the group's stance on the war despite writing just three articles, making it difficult to fully understand his position.

The first of Tsereteli's wartime articles, titled "The International and the War" ("Интернационал и Война") looked at how the differing socialist groups reacted to the war. He agreed with the majority Internationalist view, which had stated that the war was not totally inevitable, and that the International had thus been trying to limit the threat of war. He further argued that the International was not strong enough to call a general strike, as the proletariat was too weak to overthrow capitalism, and it would only hurt the movement. Tsereteli also criticised the Defensists, stating that while there could be such a thing as a just defence, "not one of the warring powers except Belgium [was] conducting a defensive war." That socialist leaders in Germany, France, and the United Kingdom had supported their respective governments in the war effort was also unacceptable to Tsereteli, though he explained that it "could not distort the historical path of the proletariat".

The second article Tsereteli wrote, "Democracy in Russia at War" ("Демократия среди воюющей России") was largely a response to the leading Russian "Defensists", namely Georgi Plekhanov and Alexander Potresov, and refuted their argument. He stated that all of the warring states were guilty and none could be victorious. His third article, "For Two Years" ("За два года"), looked at how the war had evolved, and how bourgeois nationalism had encompassed the conflict. He called the conflict an "imperialist struggle over spheres of influence", largely conforming to the view of the International, though also stating his support for the idea of self-defence. Publication of more articles was halted by the authorities, but the articles Tsereteli did write had a considerable impact, and helped keep him relevant even while in exile.

== February Revolution and aftermath ==
=== Petrograd Soviet ===
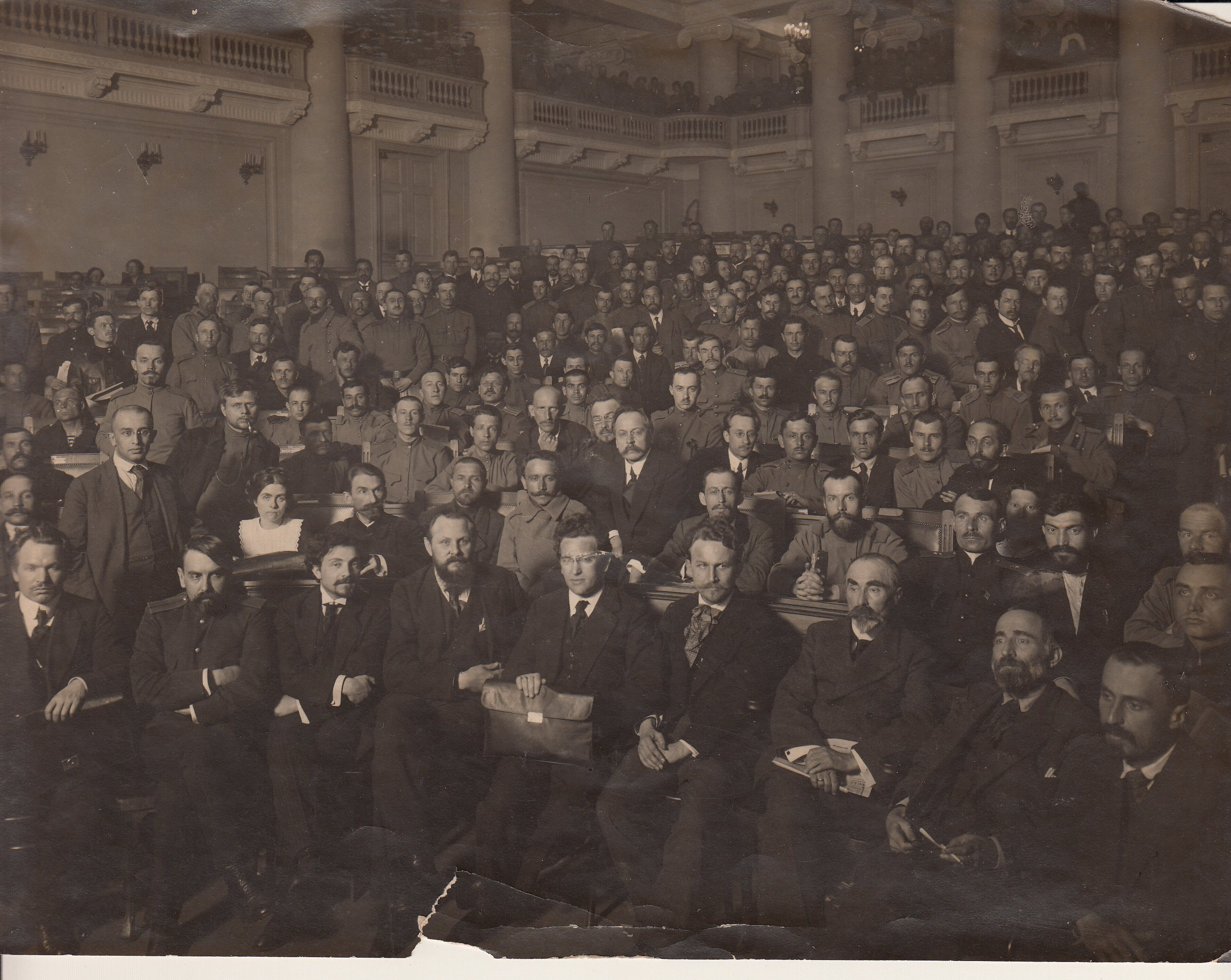
Members of the Petrograd Soviet in 1917. Tsereteli is seated in the front row, far right.

News of the February Revolution, the mass protests that led to the overthrow of the Tsar and ended the Russian Empire, began on 23 February 1917; news of it first arrived in Irkutsk on 2 March and reached Usolye that evening; Tsereteli left for Irkutsk the following morning. Several people, including Tsereteli, arrested the regional governor and declared Irkutsk a free city. A committee consisting of important social groups was formed to run the city, while a soviet (council) of soldiers was simultaneously created. Tsereteli took a leading role in this committee, though the work took a considerable toll on his health and after ten days he stepped down as he began to vomit blood. His family and friends suggested he return to Georgia, though Tsereteli instead decided to travel to Petrograd (the name St. Petersburg had adopted at the start of the war), arriving there on 19 or 20 March.

Tsereteli was the first of the major exiled politicians to arrive in Petrograd after the revolution, and thus was welcomed by a large crowd at the train station. Immediately, Tsereteli went to the Petrograd Soviet and gave a speech in support of the revolution, but warned members that it was too early to implement socialist policies. At the time of his arrival, there was no clear leadership of the country, with both the Petrograd Soviet and the Provisional Government claiming authority. The Soviet, composed of representatives of workers and soldiers, enjoyed popular support, though it was not regarded as a government. In contrast, the Provisional Government claimed it was the legitimate governmental successor to the Russian Empire, but did not have the support of the people. Each thus needed the other to legitimize their claim. This system, later dubbed "dual power", was highly inefficient, though neither side wanted to upset the balance lest they lose their power.

Due to his former membership in the Duma, Tsereteli was appointed to the Soviet on 21 March in an advisory role. At his first meeting he argued that Russia should strive to defend itself, calling defence "one of the fundamentals of the revolution". He stated that both the country and the revolution had to be defended from the German Empire, but also that the Soviet should pressure the Provisional Government to negotiate a peace, one that recognized self-determination and did not include annexation. This policy would soon be given the name "Revolutionary Defensism". Tsereteli led the Soviet side in negotiations with the Provisional Government to have the no-annexation policy adopted, in the process showing that he had effectively become a leader within the Soviet. Tsereteli was not seeking an increased role for himself, nor did he want the Soviet to become a power-base, but simply a representative body of the workers and soldiers.

=== Minister in the Provisional Government ===
The April Crisis – a series of demonstrations against Russia's continued participation in the war and a note to the Allied powers affirming that Russia was still interested in annexing Constantinople – nearly led to the downfall of the Provisional Government, and it survived mainly due to negotiations with the Soviet to form a coalition. The coalition was unpopular among many of the Mensheviks, Tsereteli included, but they realized that without the support of the Soviet the Provisional Government was unlikely to survive another threat like the April Crisis, thereby ending the Revolution, so they supported it. Though the socialists could have dominated the newly formed cabinet, Tsereteli cautioned that this would only hurt their cause, so they only took six of the fifteen cabinet posts.

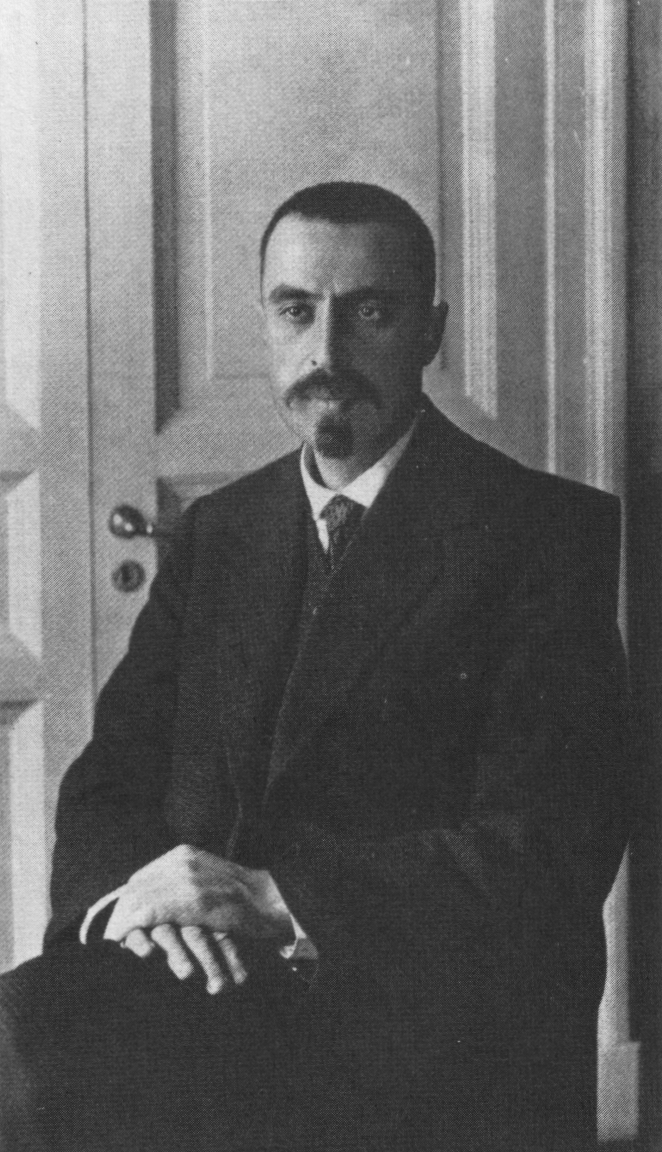
Tsereteli as Minister of Post and Telegraph, 1917

Tsereteli was given the position of Minister of Post and Telegraph, an office created just so he could be in the cabinet. Reluctant to join the government, Tsereteli only did so in hopes of avoiding the dissolution of the Provisional Government and the outbreak of civil war. He did little in his role as minister, which he held until August 1917, and kept his focus on the Soviet, leaving the actual administration to others. In his memoirs, Tsereteli never mentioned his time as minister, and the only notable action he took in the position was an attempt to increase the pay of post office employees. Even so, Tsereteli's position in the cabinet was aimed at allowing him to serve as a liaison between the Provisional Government and Soviet. He also realized that, as a member of the cabinet, he could "exercise real influence upon the government, since the government and the middle classes which back it are greatly impressed by the power of the Soviet". Despite his relatively unimportant ministerial post, Tsereteli was regarded as a major figure by his peers: Viktor Chernov called him the "Minister of General Affairs", while Nikolai Sukhanov referred to him as the "Commissar of the Government in the Soviet". Highly valued by the Prime Minister, Georgy Lvov, Tsereteli was part of the "inner cabinet" that held the real power in the Provisional Government. He would later express support for the cabinet, as long as it benefited the Revolution.

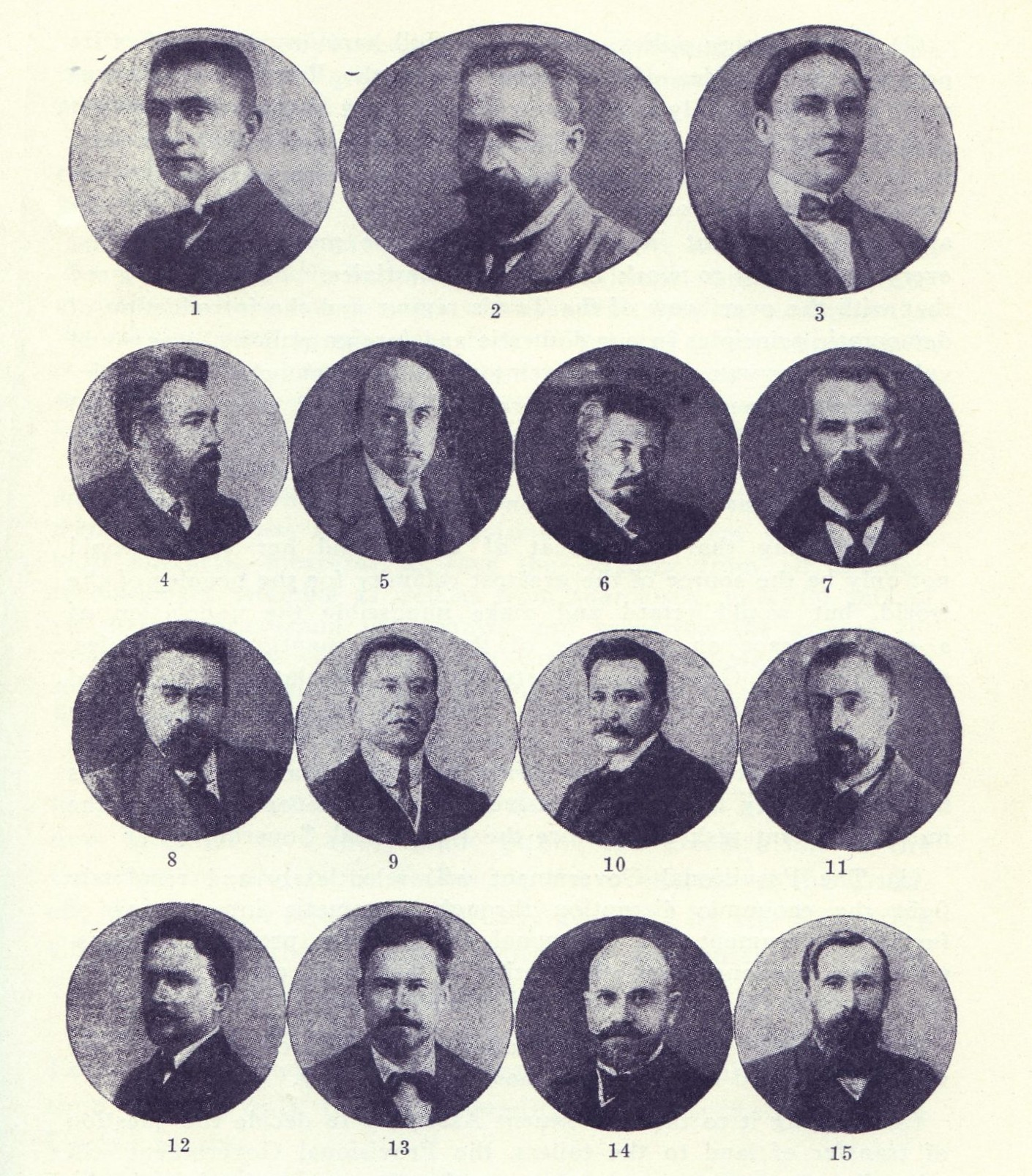
The second cabinet of the Russian Provisional Government. Tsereteli (third row, far right; number 11) served as Minister of the Interior for two weeks before a new cabinet was formed.

Lvov resigned as prime minister on 2 July 1917, after disagreements within the cabinet regarding the status of the Ukrainian People's Republic, which was in control of Ukraine. Tsereteli had travelled to Kiev with a party representing the Provisional Government to negotiate a means to ensure defence of Russia while respecting Ukrainian self-determination. The outcome saw the Ukrainians allow the Russians to continue to defend their territory, while granting increased autonomy, a move opposed by many in the cabinet. This came at the same time as the July Days, a major demonstration that broke out in Petrograd, and threatened the Provisional Government. The Provisional Government was able to withstand the threat, and Alexander Kerensky took over as prime minister. Though Tsereteli opposed Kerensky, seeing him as the force behind Lvov's resignation, he had little option but to consent to the move.

Tsereteli was appointed Minister of the Interior, serving for two weeks until a new cabinet could be formed. Despite his senior ranking in the Soviet, Tsereteli was passed over for the post of prime minister, ostensibly because of his position; the coalition wanted reform and felt that influence from the Soviet would prevent that. However, with Kerensky frequently absent, Tsereteli served as the de facto Prime Minister, and tried to implement some domestic reforms and restore order throughout the country. Upon his return, Kerenskey was given a mandate to form a new cabinet, though Tsereteli declined a position in it, wanting instead to focus his efforts in the Soviet. He used his influence to force Kerensky to release Leon Trotsky, imprisoned in the aftermath of the July Days; Tsereteli needed Trotsky and the Bolsheviks to support the socialist movement in the Soviet against the Kadets. This had the opposite effect, as Trotsky quickly proceeded to orchestrate a Bolshevik takeover of the Soviet, expelling Tsereteli.

=== October Revolution ===
Removed from his post in the Soviet and suffering from tuberculosis, Tsereteli decided to move into semi-retirement. At the end of September 1917, he returned to Georgia, his first visit there in ten years. Roobol believed that Tsereteli only left because he was confident that the new Kerensky government was secure enough to last until the Constituent Assembly could meet. Though the Bolsheviks now had control of the Soviet, Tseretli was dismissive of them as a threat to the Provisional Government; while he expected them to try and seize power, he expected them to only last "two or three weeks".

Tsereteli stayed in Georgia for about a month, returning to Petrograd after the Bolsheviks seized control in the October Revolution. Seen as a threat due to his position as a leading Menshevik and a delegate for the upcoming Constituent Assembly, Tsereteli had a warrant for his arrest issued on 17 December. He defied the authorities and stayed in Petrograd for the only meeting of the Constituent Assembly, which took place on 5 January 1918. Speaking to the body, he attacked the Bolsheviks, accusing them of failing to do anything constructive, and stifling any criticism against their policies. The assembly was dissolved by the Bolshevik regime after its lone meeting. Now fearing arrest, Tserteli returned to Georgia, which had broken away from Russian control during the Revolutions.

== Return to Georgia ==
=== Georgian independence ===
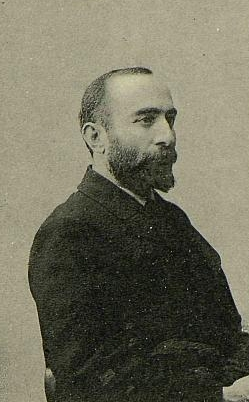
Nikolay Chkheidze, a fellow Georgian, served as President of the Petrograd Soviet and later accompanied Tsereteli to the Paris Peace Conference.

Back in Georgia, Tsereteli delivered a speech on 23 February 1918 at the Transcaucasian Centre of Soviets, reporting on the events in Russia. He warned the delegates of the problems dual power had caused, and that the soviet would have to surrender its power to a legislative body. This was established as the "Seim", a de facto parliament created the same day. A member of this new body, Tsereteli took up a leading role in helping defend the Transcaucasus, which included Armenia, Azerbaijan, and Georgia, from the approaching forces of the Ottoman Empire. He strongly denounced the Treaty of Brest-Litovsk, which was signed between the Bolshevik government and the Central Powers to end Russia's involvement in the war, as it would have meant ceding important Transcaucasian territories to the Ottoman, such as the Black Sea port city of Batumi. In response to this the Transcaucasus declared war against the Ottoman Empire on 14 April.

The tripartite Transcaucasian Democratic Federative Republic was formed on 22 April, though due to the ongoing invasion by the Ottoman Empire and the lack of unity among the three groups, it was immediately in a precarious position. The Georgians, afraid for their own country and future, began negotiating with Germany for protection against the Ottomans, which would come in the form of an independent state. On 26 May Tsereteli gave a speech to the Seim stating that from the start the Transcaucasian Republic had been unable to operate due to its people not being unified. On the same day, the Georgian leadership declared an independent state, the Democratic Republic of Georgia. This was followed two days later by Azerbaijan and, finally, Armenia, dissolving the Transcaucasian Republic.

Within the new Georgian state Tsereteli took up a seat in the Constituent Assembly, which was elected in February 1919. However, he did not play a major role in the Georgian government, instead helping out more in an advisory role. That he supported what was essentially a nationalist state contradicted his earlier internationalist stance, though Roobol suggested that Tsereteli "wanted a state which would be more than a Georgian national state", and championed the causes of the ethnic minorities within Georgia. Even so, he was no longer able to exercise much political influence, and faded into the background.

=== Paris Peace Conference and Europe ===
In 1919, Tsereteli and Nikolay Chkheidze were asked to lead a Georgian delegation to the Paris Peace Conference; the two were asked to attend on account of their contacts in Europe, and as neither had a major role in the Georgian government they could leave Georgia for an extended period. They faced considerable difficulties there, as many of the delegates were unfamiliar with the situation in Georgia, so both Tsereteli and Chkheidze gave several newspaper interviews expressing that Georgia was only interested in gaining de jure recognition of its independence. Tsereteli subsequently visited London to help their cause. While he did not make much of an impact with the British government, the Georgian government was de facto recognized on 10 January 1920, mainly because the British wanted allies in the region in case the Bolsheviks allied with the Turks and took over the region.

His diplomatic efforts a success, Tsereteli returned to advocating socialism. In the summer of 1920 he represented the Georgian Social Democratic Party at a Labour and Socialist International conference in Switzerland and promoted the success of Georgia as a socialist state. He also proved instrumental in helping Karl Kautsky, a leading Marxist theoretician, arrive in Georgia in August 1920 to research a book on the country. However, his health problems returned, and Tsereteli was ordered by a doctor to rest in December of that year.

== Exile and later life ==
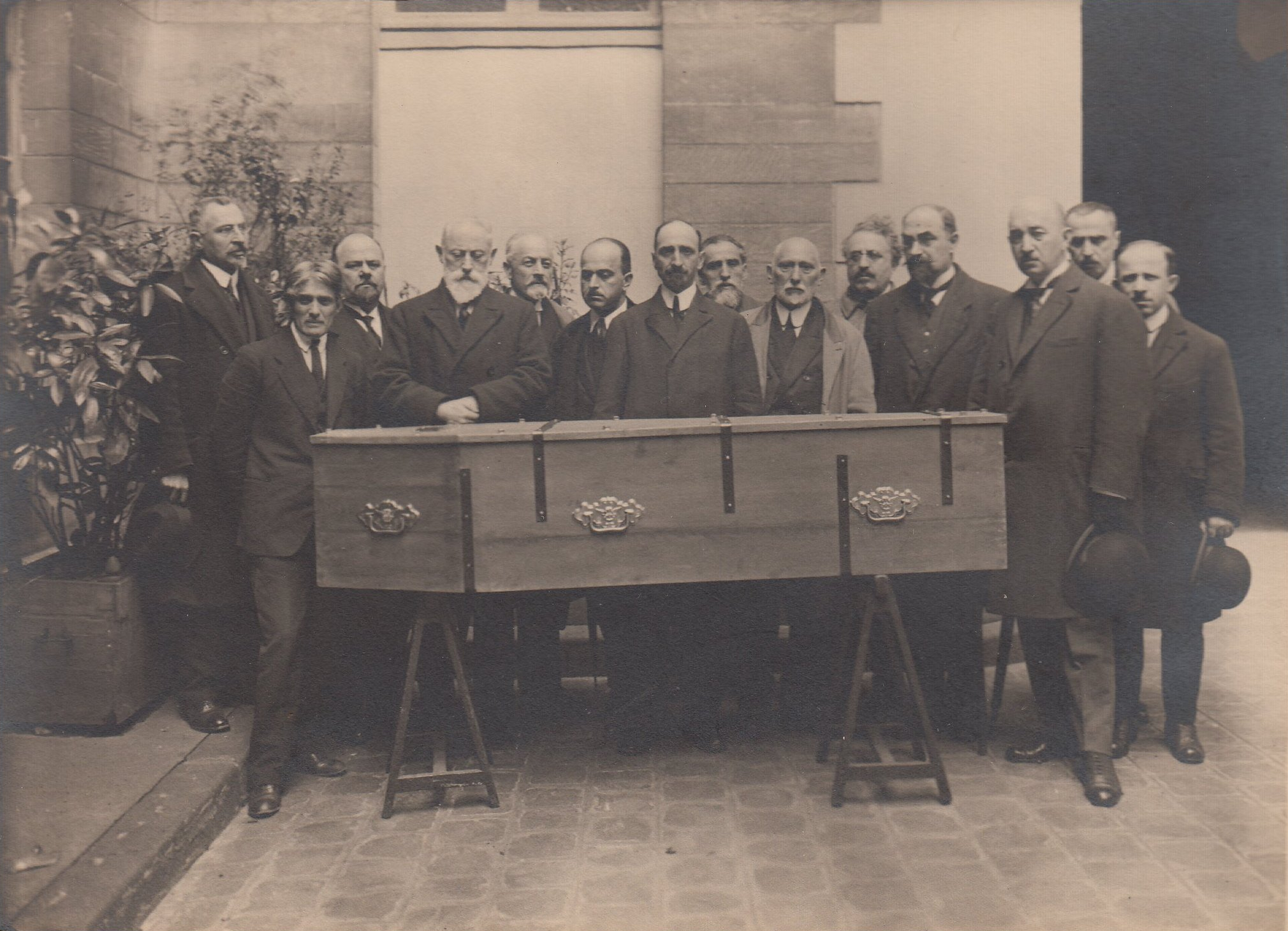
Georgian politicians surrounding the coffin of Nikolay Chkheidze in Paris, 15 June 1926. Tsereteli stands second from right.

Tsereteli was recovering in France when he heard about the Red Army invasion of Georgia and subsequent Bolshevik takeover in February 1921. The news had a detrimental impact on his health, and he retired to a French village for the summer. He also worried about his Nikoladze aunts, as they had lost considerable amounts of money with the Bolshevik occupation. When his health improved in October, Tsereteli moved to Paris, joining the Georgian government-in-exile. In exile he lived frugally, and quickly grew tired of residing in France, enjoying any opportunity to travel. The suicide of Chkheidze in 1926 had a profound impact on Tsereteli, and it exacerbated his distaste for exile.

After retiring from émigré political life in 1930, Tsereteli resumed his law studies, which he had never completed in his youth, finishing in 1932, and worked in Paris as a lawyer. He also helped edit fellow Menshevik Pavel Axelrod's works after the latter's death in 1928. Initially working with Fedor Dan, whom he had met during his Siberian exile, Tsereteli and Dan clashed as the latter had become more pro-Bolshevik, and Dan ultimately left the project over their dispute. Tsereteli would later be aided in this work by his friend and fellow socialist Vladimir Voitinsky, and the project was published in Germany in 1932.

Highly indignant about what he called the "platonic attitude" of the Western socialist parties towards Georgia and their inadequate support to the beleaguered country, Tsereteli continued to regard Bolshevism as the cause of the troubles, but believed that the Bolshevik regime would not survive long. He continued to attend International's conferences in Europe, trying to get the organization to adopt a stronger anti-Bolshevik stance, though with limited success. He attended the Conference of the Three Internationals in Berlin, at which the issue of Georgia was a major topic. By 1928, as the inner conflicts of the Bolsheviks ended, it became apparent to Tsereteli that they would not so easily be removed from power, and his hopes of returning to Georgia faded.

Tsereteli gradually distanced himself from his fellow Georgian exiles, and opposed both the liberal nationalist Zurab Avalishvili and the social democrat Noe Zhordania; all three wrote extensively abroad on Georgian politics. Tsereteli accepted the principle of the fight for Georgia's independence, but rejected the view of Zhordania and other Georgian émigrés that the Bolshevik domination was effectively identical to Russian domination. Furthermore, he insisted on close cooperation between the Russian and Georgian anti-Bolshevik socialists, but did not agree with any cooperation with Georgian nationalists. This led to Tsereteli's isolation among fellow émigrés and he largely withdrew from political activity. Invited to join Voitinsky in the United States, Tsereteli waited until after the Second World War ended to do so, finally moving in 1948. Columbia University asked him to finish writing his memoirs, which he continued to work on until his death due to cancer in New York City on 20 May 1959. In 1973, he was reburied at the Leuville Cemetery near Paris.

== Political views ==
Throughout his life Tsereteli remained a committed internationalist, adopting this view during his first exile in Siberia. He felt that if the population of the Russian Empire were united, and not divided along ethnic or national lines, socialist policies could be implemented. His views were heavily influenced by the writings of Pavel Axelrod, whom Tsereteli considered his most important teacher. After reading Lenin's What Is To Be Done? in 1902, he came to oppose Lenin's Marxist views. Tsereteli never deviated from his internationalist stance, which eventually led to conflict with other Georgian Mensheviks, who became far more nationalist throughout the 1920s.

Upon the outbreak of the First World War, Tsereteli, still exiled in Siberia, formulated a policy that allowed for the continuation of the war, in contrast to the more mainstream socialist goals of pressuring governments to end the conflict. This policy, expressed in three articles written by Tsereteli, would become known as "Siberian Zimmerwaldism", in reference to the Zimmerwald Conference of 1915 that first saw the socialist views of the war put forth. Siberian Zimmerwaldism allowed for, under certain circumstances, a defensive war, though Tsereteli argued that only Belgium fitted these criteria, as the other warring states were fighting offensively. Though he edited the journal that published the Siberian Zimmerwaldist views, Tsereteli only wrote three articles during the war, making it difficult to fully comprehend his views at the time.

== Legacy ==
During his political career, Tsereteli was highly regarded by his peers, though he has since faded into relative obscurity. His leading role in the Petrograd Soviet led Lenin to refer to Tsereteli as "the conscience of the Revolution". Trotsky also paid tribute to him as "a splendid speaker whose moral authority had a strong appeal" adding: "He was the only one of my opponents to be taken seriously, but, as is often the case in history, it took a revolution to prove that Tsereteli was not a revolutionary." Lvov would later call him "the only true statesman in the Soviet". However, his refusal to perceive the Bolsheviks as a serious threat, even as late as October 1917, ultimately helped them lead the October Revolution. As Georgi Plekhanov, a contemporary Marxist and revolutionary, stated: "Tsereteli and his friends without themselves knowing or desiring it, have been preparing the road for Lenin."

Tsereteli quickly faded from prominence in histories of the era. Rex A. Wade, one of the preeminent historians of the Russian Revolution, noted that Tsereteli "was not as flamboyant as Kerensky or as well known to foreigners as Miliukov, and therefore has not attracted as much attention as either in Western writings". Roobol concluded that "it was [his] prestige rather than the force of his arguments which won over the doubters". Roobol also described Tsereteli's career as "a rapid rise, a short period of generally recognized leadership and a rather more gradual slide into political isolation".

== Bibliography ==
- Ascher, Abraham (2001), P. A. Stolypin: The Search for Stability in Late Imperial Russia, Stanford, California: Stanford University Press, ISBN 978-0-80-474547-5
- Basil, John D. (1983), The Mensheviks In The Revolution of 1917, Columbus, Ohio: Slavica Publishers, ISBN 978-0-89-357109-2
- Ferro, Marc (1972), The Russian Revolution of February 1917, translated by Richards, J.L., London: Routledge & Kegan Paul, ISBN 978-0-13-784579-8
- Figes, Orlando (1996), A People's Tragedy: A History of the Russian Revolution, New York City: Viking, ISBN 978-0-14-024364-2
- Galil y Garcia, Ziva (Autumn 1982), "The Origins of Revolutionary Defensism: I. G. Tsereteli and the "Siberian Zimmerwaldists."", Slavic Review, 41 (3): 454–476, doi:10.2307/2497019, JSTOR 2497019, S2CID 251376107
- González, John A. (2017), An Intellectual Biography of N.A. Rozhkov: Life in a Bell Jar, Leiden, The Netherlands: Brill, ISBN 978-9-00-432850-1
- Jones, Stephen F. (2005), Socialism in Georgian Colors: The European Road to Social Democracy 1883–1917, Cambridge, Massachusetts: Harvard University Press, ISBN 978-0-67-401902-7
- Kazemzadeh, Firuz (1951), The Struggle for Transcaucasia (1917–1921), New York City: Philosophical Library, ISBN 978-0-95-600040-8
- Kindersley, R.K. (January 1979), "Some Russian Losers", Soviet Studies, 31 (1): 132–140, doi:10.1080/09668137908411230
- McCauley, Martin (1997), Who's Who in Russia since 1900, London: Routledge, ISBN 978-0-415-13898-7
- Merridale, Catherine (2017), Lenin on the Train, New York City: Metropolitan Books, ISBN 978-1-62-779301-8
- Rabinowitch, Alexander (1968), Prelude to Revolution: The Petrograd Bolsheviks and the July 1917 Uprising, Bloomington, Indiana: Indiana University Press, ISBN 978-0-25-320661-9
- Rabinowitch, Alexander (1976), The Bolsheviks Come to Power: The Revolution of 1917 in Petrograd, New York City: W.W. Norton & Company, ISBN 978-0-7453-2269-8
- Rabinowitch, Alexander (2007), The Bolsheviks in Power: The First Year of Soviet Rule in Petrograd, Bloomington, Indiana: Indiana University Press, ISBN 978-0-25-334943-9
- Rayfield, Donald (2012), Edge of Empires: A History of Georgia, London: Reaktion Books, ISBN 978-1-78-023030-6
- Roobol, W.H. (1976), Tsereteli – A Democrat in the Russian Revolution: A Political Biography, translated by Hyams, Philip; Richards, Lynne, The Hague: Martinus Nijhoff, ISBN 978-9-40-101044-3
- Suny, Ronald Grigor (1994), The Making of the Georgian Nation (Second ed.), Bloomington, Indiana: Indiana University Press, ISBN 978-0-25-320915-3
- Trotsky, Leon (1965), The History of the Russian Revolution, translated by Eastman, Max, London: Victor Gollancz, ISBN 978-1-93-185945-5
- Tsereteli, I.G. (1963), Воспоминания о Февральской революции, 2 книги (Memories of the February Revolution, 2 Volumes) (in Russian), Paris: La Haye
- Wade, Rex A. (December 1967), "Irakli Tsereteli and Siberian Zimmerwaldism", The Journal of Modern History, 39 (4): 425–431, doi:10.1086/240123, S2CID 143632362
- Wade, Rex A. (2017), The Russian Revolution, 1917 (Third ed.), Cambridge, United Kingdom: Cambridge University Press, ISBN 978-1-10-757125-9
- Wade, Rex A. (1969), The Russian Search for Peace, February – October 1917, Stanford, California: Stanford University Press, ISBN 978-0-80-470707-7
- Zhordaniya, Noy (1968), Моя Жизнь (My Life) (in Russian), translated by Zhordaniya, Inny, Stanford, California: The Hoover Institution on War, Revolution and Peace, Stanford University, ISBN 978-0-81-794031-7
