= High Atlas Foundation =

- Abbreviation: HAF
- Formation: 2000
- Type: 501(c)(3) nonprofit organization
- Headquarters: Morocco
- Members: Moroccan; American
- President and Co-Founder: Yossef Ben-Meir
- Website: highatlasfoundation.org

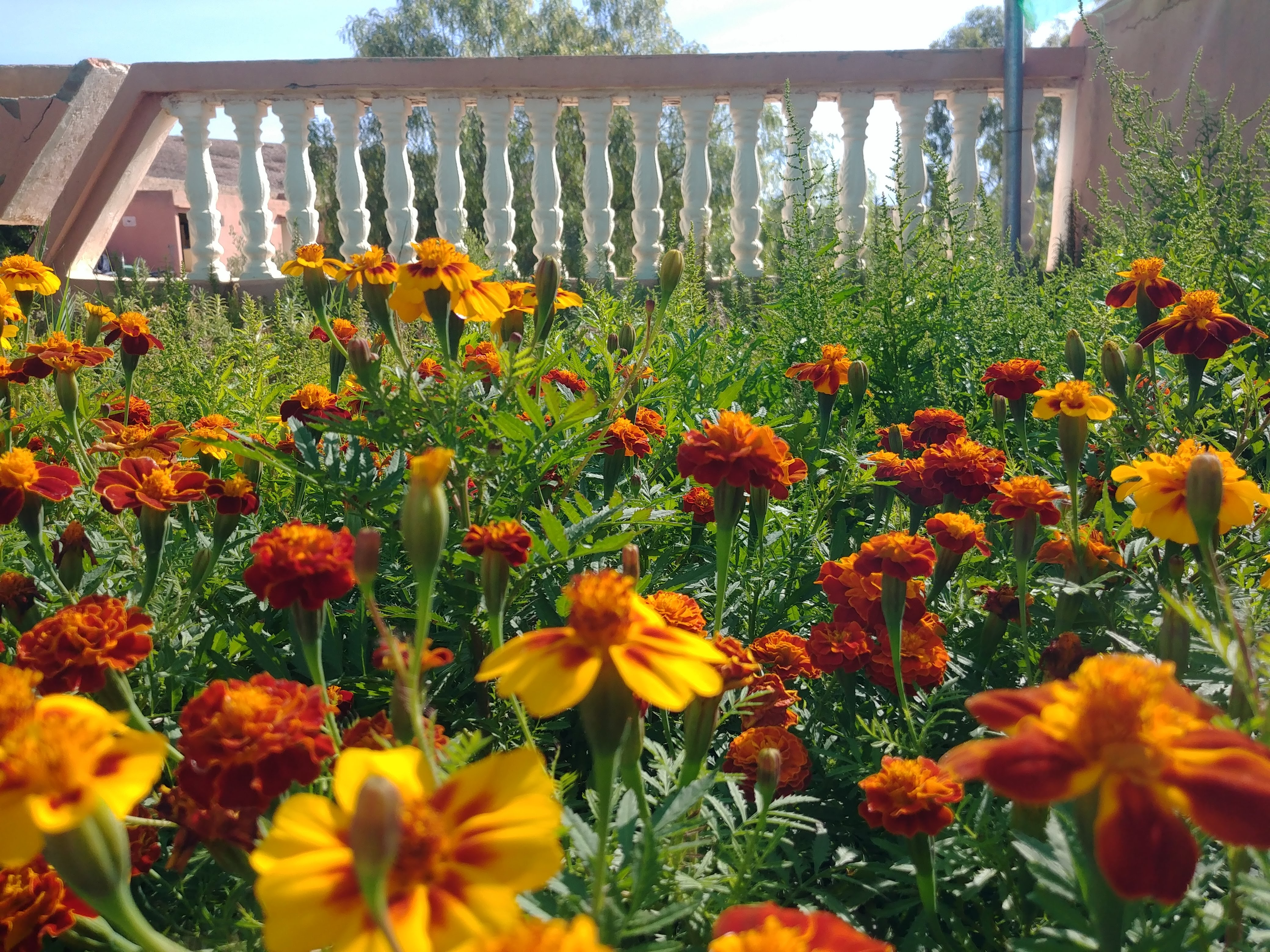

Headquartered in Morocco, the High Atlas Foundation (HAF) (Arabic: مؤسسة الأطلس الكبير; Tamazight: ⵜⴰⵎⵔⵙⵍⵜ ⵏ ⵡⴰⵟⵍⴰⵙ ⴰⵎⵇⵇⵔⴰⵏ) is a nonprofit organization that promotes community-designed initiatives for sustainable agriculture, women’s and youth empowerment, education, health, and capacity-building in Morocco.

Founded in 2000 by former Peace Corps volunteers, HAF is an American and Moroccan team that works in partnership with government and non-government agencies. HAF has held consultancy status with the United Nations Economic and Social Council since 2011.

== History ==
HAF was founded by Yossef Ben-Meir and other former Peace Corps volunteers in 2000 and began implementing projects in Morocco in 2003. Ben-Meir serves as President and oversees an international Board of Directors.

HAF received its first project funds from then-U.S. Ambassador to Morocco, Margaret D. Tutwiler, in 2003, to begin planting organic fruit trees as cash crops for disadvantaged local communities and to help stop soil erosion with the participation of the United States Agency for International Development (USAID) and other agriculture experts. The project set a precedent for Embassy discretionary funding from which HAF benefited further in later years. By 2014, HAF had planted one million fruit-bearing trees for the benefit of local communities, and went on to launch its "one billion tree campaign", planting 10,000 trees in eight Moroccan provinces in a single day toward addressing rural poverty, deforestation and soil erosion. HAF hosts an annual nationwide tree-planting event in Morocco on the third Thursday of January in observance of Dr. Martin Luther King Jr. Day. By 2016, the organization was able to plant one-two million fruit seeds and saplings annually in 15 Moroccan provinces.

Since 2008, HAF has held partnerships with national and international agencies and institutions through the support of His Majesty King Mohammed VI, Hassan II University, the High Commission of Waters and Forests, the Office Cherifien des Phosphates (OCP), and more. Through its partnerships, HAF trains facilitators in the participatory approach to community development, facilitates design of priority local projects, and supports implementation of those projects in fruit tree agriculture, clean drinking water, women and youth enterprises, and technical and managerial workshops. University students from Morocco and abroad volunteer with HAF to help plant trees and bring clean drinking water to remote villages through these partnerships.

Starting in 2011, HAF has held special Consultative Status at the United Nations Economic and Social Council. Through this access, HAF has participated in shaping the U.N.’s Sustainable Development Goals and negotiations on climate change relevant to both development and the environment in Morocco and, in 2013, participated in the Sixth Session of the United Nations General Assembly Open Working Group on Sustainable Development Goals, outlining how these can be implemented and achieved with global partners while also highlighting the challenges of countries in similar situations. HAF was represented at the United Nations Youth Climate Summit in New York City in 2019 for young leaders driving climate change solutions.

HAF was the SEED Africa award winner in sustainable agriculture in 2013 for helping the Moroccan farmers certify and sell organic walnuts and almonds produced in the High Atlas Mountains. All profits after cost were reinvested into community projects promoting entrepreneurship and fruit and nut tree growth through training and instruction.

A 2017–2018 HAF-sponsored assessment of crop biodiversity in Morocco uncovered the loss of local crop varieties and genotypes. In response to the immediate need to preserve local crops, their wild relatives, and wild medicinal plants, HAF worked toward the creation of a Seed Bank. The number of nurseries and number of seeds planted, and tree saplings delivered and planted increased significantly in 2018 with four new nurseries through HAF’s partnership with Morocco’s High Commission of Water and Forests and Ecosia, a social business based in Berlin.

In partnership with the U.S. Department of State and the Rural Family Society, HAF supported the project Realizing Sustainable Agriculture through Methods for Irrigation and Agriculture (MIRRA) in Azraq, Jordan, in 2019–2020, providing an integrated sustainable packaged solution to the challenges faced by farmers there: depletion and salinization of groundwater, salinization of soil, climate change, increased desertification, wetland loss, and decreased production of livestock.

HAF partnered with the University of Central Florida (Orlando) and The Hollings Center for International Dialogue (Washington, DC) in 2019 to conduct field work in the High Atlas Mountains that revealed the role of civil society in achieving the United Nations' 17 Sustainable Development Goals (2015) for eliminating poverty, conserving forests, and addressing climate change. HAF has also helped the indigenous Amazigh people organize into local collectives, cooperatives, and associations to achieve those goals, especially as it pertains to water and drought.

The December 2019 issue of Consumer Reports included HAF on its list of "Most Effective Charities" being rated among the most highly impactful.

HAF opened its twelfth tree nursery near Ouarzazate, Morocco, in 2020 as part of its House of Life project, growing almond, walnut, cherry, fig, pomegranate, and carob, and donating the majority of the early trees to 5,000 farming families and 2,000 public schools.

HAF further expanded its reach in 2021–2022 with more nurseries and projects in multiple additional Moroccan regions, and by 2023 was able to annually plant and distribute millions of trees with tens of thousands of farmers and hundreds of schools. Farming families benefit directly from receiving trees that increase their agricultural revenue and pay for their children's schooling materials and transportation costs.

In response to the September 2023 earthquake in Morocco's High Atlas Mountains, HAF added to its community project implementation activities to provide urgently needed food, water, shelter, and supplies to those who lost their homes, and it implemented restoration and new water infrastructure projects for both drinking and irrigation. Content for its empowerment workshops was adjusted to provide for psycho-social well-being of those who were traumatized by the destruction.

== Programs ==
=== Agriculture ===
HAF works with Moroccan communities to plant fruit trees of different varieties, including carob, walnut, pomegranate, cherry, fig, argan, date palm, and certified organic walnuts and almonds among others, while facilitating entrepreneurship and training for local farmers. After covering production costs, proceeds are reinvested in community projects that reduce chemical pesticide use through organic farming practices and capture hundreds of tons of carbon dioxide each year. HAF maintains nurseries all over Morocco, and for spreading the variety of seeds and trees around the nation, it has been called the "Johnny Appleseed of Morocco".

=== Women's empowerment ===
Moroccan women plan and implement development projects through HAF's "Imagine" workshops for empowerment, blending self-discovery activities with building women’s cooperatives. They identify and design projects that directly involve and benefit them, build feelings of self-worth, and recognize their right to socio-economic growth. HAF-supported women’s cooperatives develop value-added products that fund schools and other services in their communities, creating more stable local economies through community ownership.

Due to rural women's lack of educational opportunities and illiteracy, information access, and awareness of the rights granted them in the Moudawana (the Moroccan family code law ratified in 2004), HAF integrated a Rights-Based Approach (RBA) into the women’s empowerment training. HAF implemented a Family Literacy program for nearly 1,000 women and their preschool-age children in two Moroccan regions from 2021–2023 through funding from the European Commission.

=== Youth ===
HAF's "Safe Space" meetings allow youth to identify and implement projects that directly impact their needs as a response to their high unemployment and low political participation. HAF’s Oummat Salaam Initiative provides mentorship and agricultural skills-building for unemployed youth and youth inmates, with integration exercises for participation in community development.

=== Water ===
HAF raises funding for regional initiatives that deliver clean drinking water to remote villages in Morocco, creating jobs and protecting the environment. HAF has coordinated the efforts of international programs and local suppliers to construct pipeline systems, solar-energy pumps, and water tanks where needed so that women and children do not have to walk great distances daily for access to water for drinking, cooking, washing, and subsistence farming.

=== Capacity-building ===
HAF facilitates capacity-building in Moroccan communities through participatory planning, project management, and adaptive management of natural resources. HAF fosters capacity-building skills, involving villagers in every phase, entrusting them with decision-making authority to become agents of change, and promoting gender parity for women and girls.

=== Culture ===
The Moroccan ideal of multiculturalism is based on Morocco’s national identity of coexistence among Christians, Muslims, and Jews, and between Arabs and the indigenous Amazigh in the Maghreb and Andalusia, and it ties cultural protection to development, diversity, and reduced socio-economic divides. To that end, HAF works with its partners and the Ministry of Culture, the Ministry of Interior, and Association Mimouna on cultural preservation projects, such as protecting Jewish cemeteries left behind by the Moroccan Jewish diaspora, community mapping in the Mellah of Marrakech, and reviving an abandoned French Catholic monastery. In Essaouira, HAF has worked to restore a Franciscan church to preserve the role of Christianity in Moroccan culture and to make it a place for public meetings and education.

== Partners ==
HAF's nurseries use land lent in kind from donors, such as the Department of Waters and Forests, the Ministry of Youth and Sports, and the Moroccan Jewish community, and international partners such as Ecosia (a Berlin-based social business) to plant more than one million seeds each year.

HAF created the House of Life project in 2012 with HA3 (the High Atlas Agricultural and Artisanal social enterprise), endorsed by the Kingdom of Morocco and the Clinton Global Initiative (CGI), to form Muslim-Jewish collaboration with agriculture as a bridge between development needs and cultural history. This farm-to-table process, made possible with the no-cost loan of land next to Jewish burial sites, established organic tree and plant nurseries to benefit neighboring Muslim farming communities so that they could transition from subsistence farming and develop the local and national economy through fair-trade prices for organically-grown products and revenue reinvestment. A House of Life nursery in Akrich (Al Haouz Province) in the Marrakech-Safi region, is adjacent to the seven-hundred-year-old tomb of Jewish saint Rabbi Raphael HaCohen. A partnership with CGI Commitment to Action and an agreement to plant one million trees on the land bordering Jewish burial sites in the Azilal, Essaouira, and Ouarzazate provinces for the benefit of disadvantaged local Muslim farmers was initiated as a result of a 2016 planting and distribution ceremony at the Akrich nursery with dignitaries that included the Honorable Dwight Lamar Bush (then-U. S. Ambassador), giving farming families and local schools a chance to end food insecurity, with active collaboration from the Jewish and Muslim communities. The Moroccan government encourages such projects to promote the country’s Jewish heritage, especially to encourage the return of two million Moroccan Jews in the diaspora. HAF has engaged in a partnership with the Ambassadors Fund for Cultural Preservation through the U.S. Embassy in Rabat and the Essaouira-Mogador Association to maintain and preserve Muslim, Jewish, and Christian cemeteries in Essaouira.

Another partnership with the village of Ouaouizerth through the U.S. Bureau of Oceans and International Environmental and Scientific Affairs (OES) established a nursery growing almonds and olives in 2013, dedicated to the memory of former Peace Corps volunteer and U.S. Ambassador to Libya, J. Christopher Stevens. HAF’s partner, Ecosia, provides continued financial support to the nursery. In addition, a partnership agreement with the Ministry of National Education and Vocational Training in 2016 fostered environmental education in schools and created nurseries for planting trees at those schools.

The U.S. Agency for International Development (USAID) Farmer-to-Farmer program has supplied technical agricultural assistance to local people in developing countries through American volunteers who help establish, expand, and maintain nurseries in HAF’s community-based initiatives. In conjunction with these volunteers, HAF established a nursery in the village of Tassa Ouirgane in 2017 with funding from the United Nations Development Program (UNDP), improving irrigation, controlling erosion, adding a solar pump, and storing water for growing olives, walnuts, peaches, and plums in the nursery.

Students at University Sidi Mohamed Ben Abdellah (USMBA) in Fez, Morocco, determined in 2018 that a law clinic was needed there for the increasing number of refugees and those seeking asylum. HAF began implementing the student-run Clinique Juridique de la Faculté de Droit (CJFD) in 2020, with funding from the United States Middle East Partnership Initiative (MEPI) of the U.S. State Department and the National Endowment for Democracy to provide free legal aid to migrants, promote human rights, and assist with social integration. During the COVID-19 crisis, the clinic offered pro bono legal aid in particular to refugees, migrants, victims of human trafficking, women, and youth. HAF works with several international universities to provide service opportunities for student volunteers, such as the Global Scholars Program at the University of Michigan and the Penn International Impact Consulting (PIIC) program of the University of Pennsylvania.

HAF worked with Siemens Gamesa Renewable Energy in 2020 to distribute food, hygiene products, and clothing to thousands of Moroccans impacted by COVID-19. HAF collaboratively distributed thousands of almond and walnut trees to 500 most vulnerable households for better income and diet. HAF has also established partnerships with Association Mimouna, Crédit Agricole du Maroc Foundation, FRÉ Skincare, Empowerment Institute, INDH (National Initiative for Human Development), National Endowment for Democracy (NED), and PUR Project.
