= Siberian Zimmerwaldists =

The Siberian Zimmerwaldists were a political grouping which emerged in 1915 in Siberia amongst political exiles in Irkutsk. The Siberian Zimmerwaldists got their name from the Zimmerwald Conference, though they existed as a cohesive group prior to that conference, which occurred in September 1915. The exact origins of the name are unclear, though Rex A. Wade suggests it may have been created by Nikolai Sukhanov. They consisted of two principal currents: social democrats—whether Bolshevik, Menshevik, or unaligned—and Internationalist Socialist Revolutionaries grouped around Avram Gots. Irakli Tsereteli, a Georgian Social Democrat exiled in Siberia, took up a leading role within the movement, editing the journal produced by the group and serving as a mentor for several of the members.

At its heart Siberian Zimmerwaldism was based on the ideals of the branch of socialists who were opposed to the war and wanted to restore the Second International, which had fractured upon the outbreak of the war as the various socialist groups differed on policy towards the war: many had abandoned the International in favour of defence of their countries (the so-called "Majority"), while the "Minority" was split between the extreme left (led by Vladimir Lenin), which advocated class warfare, and the more mainstream view that sought to use the International; as such they were known as the "Internationalists", to which the Siberian Zimmerwaldists were related.

== Bibliography ==
- Galil y Garcia, Ziva (Autumn 1982), "The Origins of Revolutionary Defensism: I. G. Tsereteli and the 'Siberian Zimmerwaldists'", Slavic Review, 41 (3): 454–476, doi:10.2307/2497019
- Roobol, W. H. (1976), Tsereteli – A Democrat in the Russian Revolution: A Political Biography, translated by Hyams, Philip; Richards, Lynne, The Hague: Martinus Nijhoff
- Wade, Rex A. (December 1967), "Irakli Tsereteli and Siberian Zimmerwaldism", The Journal of Modern History, 39 (4): 425–431, doi:10.1086/240123
