= Perevi =

Perevi პერევი
- Location of Perevi in Georgia
- Coordinates: 42°22′09″N 43°36′05″E
- Country: Georgia
- Mkhare: Imereti
- Municipality: Sachkhere
- Elevation: 2,490 ft (760 m)

Population (2014)
  - Total: 564
- Time zone: UTC+4 (Georgian Time)
- Area code: +995

Perevi (Georgian: პერევი) is a village, located in the Chali Community of the Sachkhere Municipality of the Imereti region of Georgia.

== Russo-Georgian War ==
From 2008 to 2010 it was occupied by Russia as part of the Russo-Georgian War.

On the 18th of October 2010, Russian troops withdrew from the village. According to Russian Deputy Foreign Minister Grigory Karasin, the withdrawal was an action of goodwill.
