= Penza electoral district =

Constituency of the Russian Republic

Penza
- Former Civilian constituency for the All-Russian Constituent Assembly
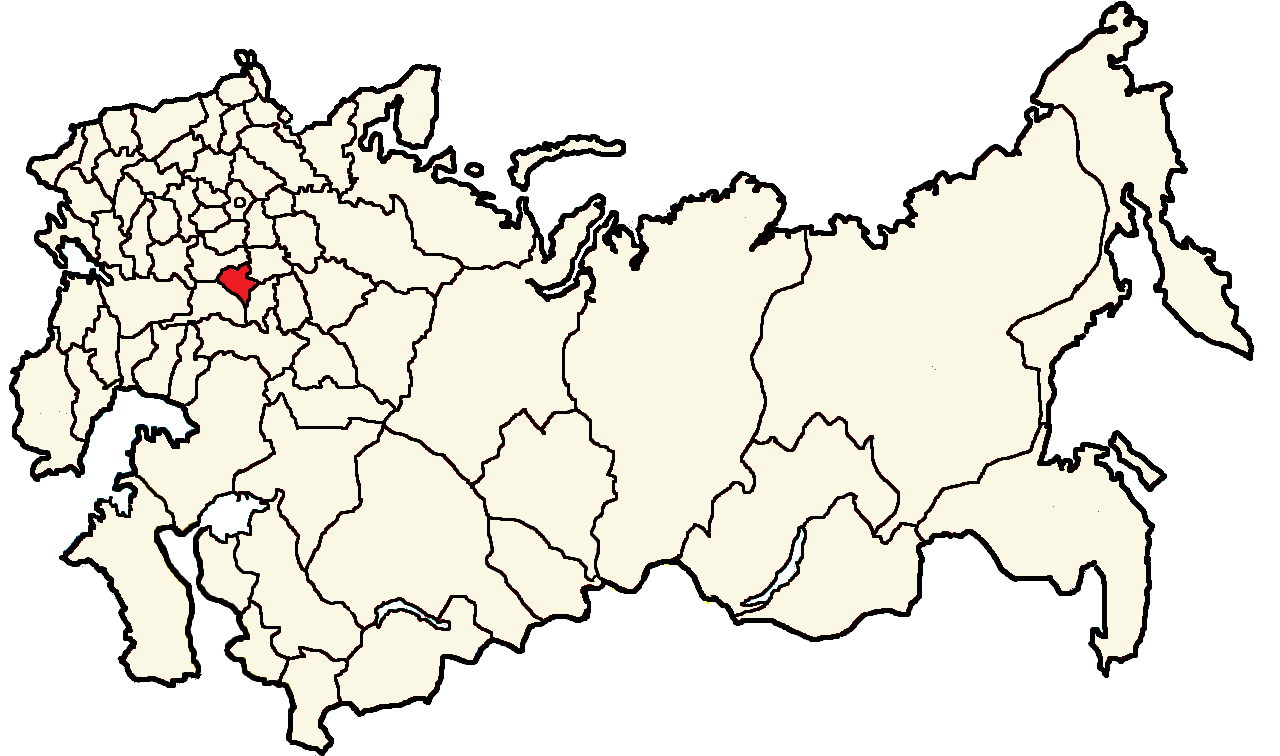

Former constituency
- Created: 1917
- Abolished: 1918
- Number of members: 9
- Number of Uyezd Electoral Commissions: 10
- Number of Urban Electoral Commissions: 1
- Number of Parishes: 231

The Penza electoral district (Russian: Пензенский избирательный округ) was a constituency created for the 1917 Russian Constituent Assembly election.

The electoral district covered the Penza Governorate. 5 out of 11 submitted candidate lists were disqualified (and some additional lists submitted their lists too late to register). In Penza town there were 49,741 eligible voters, out of whom 17,583 voted (35%).

== Results ==
Penza
Party	Vote	%
List 4 - Socialist-Revolutionaries	517,226	81.29
List 5 - Bolsheviks- Menshevik-Internationalists	54,731	8.60
List 3 - National Bloc (Ukrainians, Muslims, Poles and Lithuanians)	29,821	4.69
List 1 - Kadets	25,407	3.99
List 2 - Mensheviks-Bund	4,726	0.74
List 6 - Popular Socialists	4,336	0.68
Total:	636,247	

Deputies Elected
Avksentiev	SR
Boldov	SR
Fedorovich	SR
Gots	SR
Konogov	SR
Kostin	SR
Leutnov	SR
Prokhorov	SR
Tsyngovatov	SR
