= Meore Dasi =

Late-19th-century Georgian liberal intelligentsia

Second Group მეორე დასი
- Founders: Giorgi Tsereteli and Petre Umikashvili
- Founded: 1869
- Dissolved: 1892
- Preceded by: First Group
- Succeeded by: Third Group
- Ideology: Liberalism
- Political position: Centre to centre-left

Meore Dasi (Georgian: მეორე დასი; "Second Group") was the name for a group of Georgian liberal intelligentsia that existed in the latter part of the 19th century, when Georgia was part of the Russian Empire. Founded in 1869 by Giorgi Tsereteli and Petre Umikashvili, it was a contrast to the Pirveli dasi (პირველი დასი; "First Group") that was based around Ilia Chavchavadze and was one of the first Georgian nationalist groups to exist.

Responding to the new economic and political currents in European life, the meore dasi members, such as Tsereteli, Niko Nikoladze, and Sergei Meskhi, were more radical than their predecessors in engaging in journalism, urban politics, and business, and according to historian Ronald Grigor Suny they were "the first group of Georgian intellectuals to become involved primarily in the urban and economic life in Georgia.

They were supplanted by the Mesame Dasi (მესამე დასი, "Third Group"), which was composed mainly of Georgian social democrats.
