= Gorisa =

Gorisa გორისა
- Location within Georgia
- Coordinates: 42°16′43″N 43°26′14″E
- Country: Georgia
- Mkhare: Imereti
- District: Sachkhere
- Elevation: 820 m (2,690 ft)

Population (2014)
  - Total: 1,087
- Time zone: UTC+4 (Georgian Time)

Gorisa (Georgian: გორისა) is a village in the Sachkhere Municipality of Imereti in western Georgia. It is the birthplace of Giorgi Tsereteli, a Georgian writer of the 19th century, and his son, Irakli Tsereteli, a leading Georgian Menshevik.
