= Cultivating New Frontiers in Agriculture =

U.S.-based international development nonprofit

Cultivating New Frontiers in Agriculture (CNFA) is a non-profit international development organization based in Washington, DC. CNFA's mission is to increase and sustain rural incomes in less developed areas of the world by assisting farmers and rural entrepreneurs. CNFA works in Eastern Europe, the Caucasus, South and Central Asia, Africa, the Near and Middle East and the Caribbean to improve agricultural economies by:

- Strengthening market linkages
- Building input supply networks
- Promoting enterprise growth and development
- Enabling agribusiness financing
- Improving processing and marketing

CNFA receives funding from a variety of donors, including USAID, USDA, the Millennium Challenge Corporation, and the Rockefeller Foundation.

== History ==
CNFA was founded in 1985 as the Citizens Network for Foreign Affairs.

The Citizens Network's National Policy Roundtable Programs was focused on expanding grassroots dialogue on the U.S. stake in global economic growth to include women, minorities, farmers, agribusinesses and small- and medium- size companies.

In 1993, CNFA began the Food Systems Restructuring Program, using USAID funds to bring about agricultural reform in the NIS (Post-Soviet states), and sent out its first international volunteers to Russia and Ukraine.

Having shifted its focus from fostering dialogue to using public funds to promote international development, the Citizens Network for Foreign Affairs legally changed its name to CNFA in September 2007.

== Current programs ==
CNFA is active in the following countries:

- Afghanistan
- Angola
- Azerbaijan
- Belarus
- Burkina Faso
- Ethiopia
- Georgia
- Ghana
- Haiti
- Kenya
- Malawi
- Mali
- Moldova
- Mozambique
- Niger
- Nigeria
- Pakistan
- Tanzania
- Tajikistan
- Uganda
- Uzbekistan

== See also ==
- Farmer to Farmer
