= Vladimir Darchiashvili =

Vladimir "Lado" Darchiashvili (Georgian: ვლადიმერ [ლადო] დარჩიაშვილი; 1872 – 7 May 1916) was a Georgian journalist and politician involved with the social democratic movement early in the 1900s.

Darchiashvili was born in the eastern province of Kakheti, then under the Russian rule. He received his early education at the Tiflis theological seminary from where he was expelled for reading prohibited literature. From 1898 to 1905 he studied at Paris and Brussels. Returning to Georgia, Darchiashvili wrote for local opposition press and emerged as the leader of the right-leaning social-democrats. On the pages of his newspapers, alioni (Dawn) and chveni kvali (Our Furrow) established in 1908, he criticized Georgian social democracy's subservience to the Russian Social Democratic Labour Party (RSDLP) on the national question and demanded, like the rival Social-Federalist Party, national autonomy for Georgia within a cantonal system in the Caucasus, though remaining orthodox Menshevik on all other questions. He went to Germany in 1914, but was interned by the German authorities during World War I and died in captivity.
