= Giorgi Tsereteli (writer) =

Georgian writer (1842–1900)

- გიორგი წერეთელი
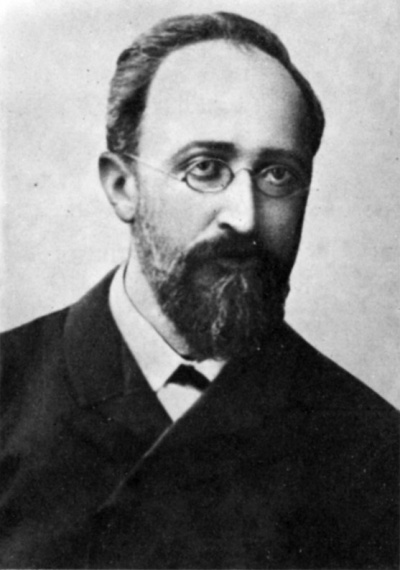
- Born: 14 May 1842; Gorisa, Georgia-Imeretia Governorate, Russian Empire
- Died: 12 January 1900 (aged 57); Tiflis, Tiflis Governorate, Russian Empire
- Education: Saint Petersburg State University
- Occupation: Writer
- Spouse: Olympiada Nikoladze
- Children: 3 (Eliko, Levan, Irakli)
- Writing career
- Language: Georgian

Giorgi Tsereteli (Georgian: გიორგი წერეთლი; 14 May 1842 – 12 January 1900) was a Georgian writer, and the father of Irakli Tsereteli, a leading figure in the Georgian Mensheviks. In 1869 he helped form meore dasi, a group of Georgian intellectuals dedicated to liberal ideas.
