= Ouaouizert =

- Town
- Location within Morocco
- Coordinates: 32°9′31″N 6°21′18″W
- Country: Morocco
- Region: Béni Mellal-Khénifra
- Province: Béni Mellal
- Time zone: UTC+0 (GMT)

Ouaouizert, also Ouaouizaght or Ouaouizeght, is a town in Béni Mellal Province, Béni Mellal-Khénifra, Morocco. According to the 2004 census it has a population of 8,940.
