= Sachkhere Municipality =

Coordinates: 42°20′43″N 43°25′10″E

Sachkhere Municipality საჩხერის მუნიციპალიტეტი
- Municipality
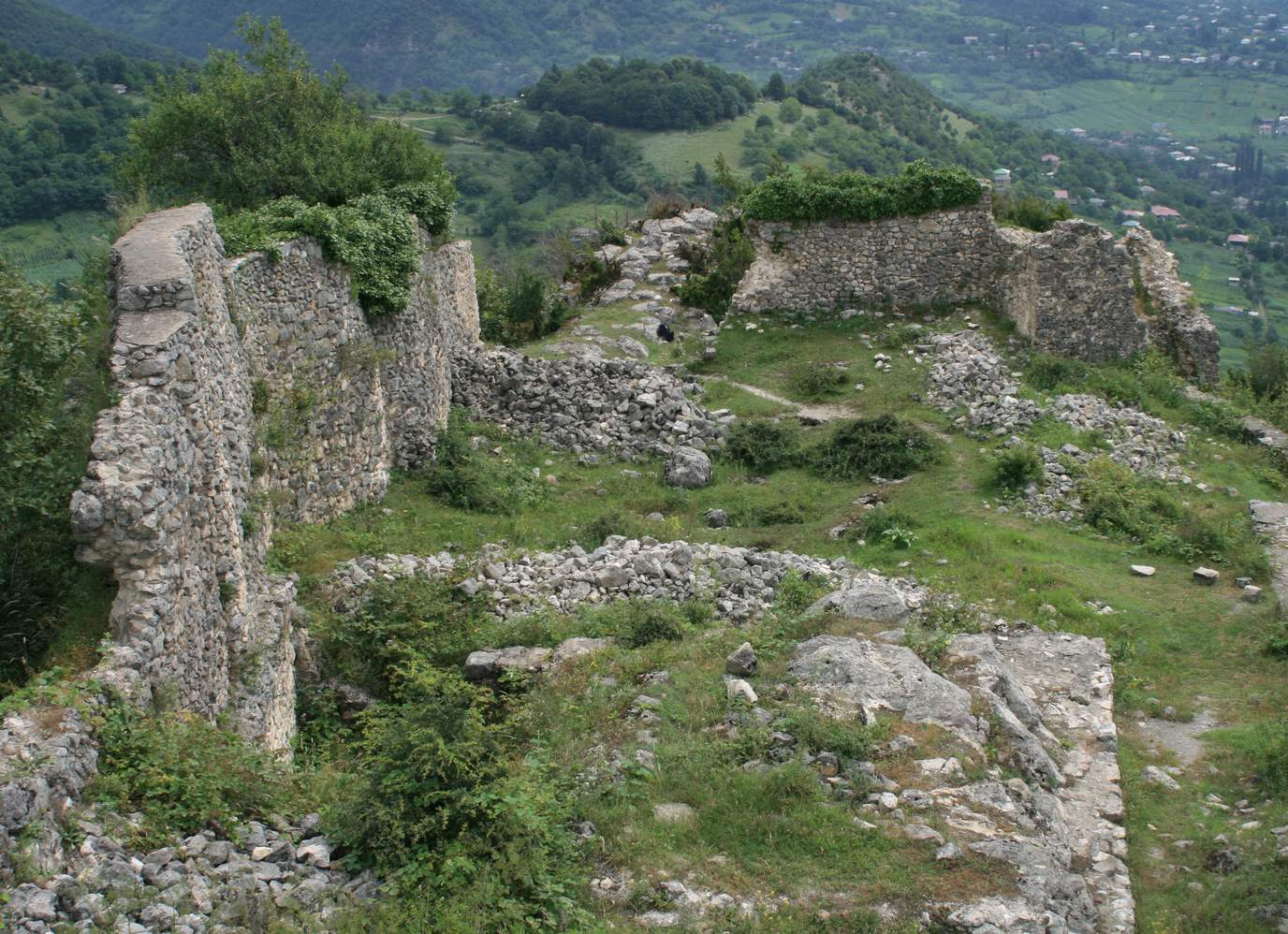
- Modinakhe fortress

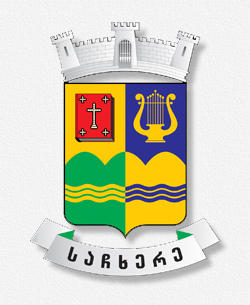
- Flag Seal

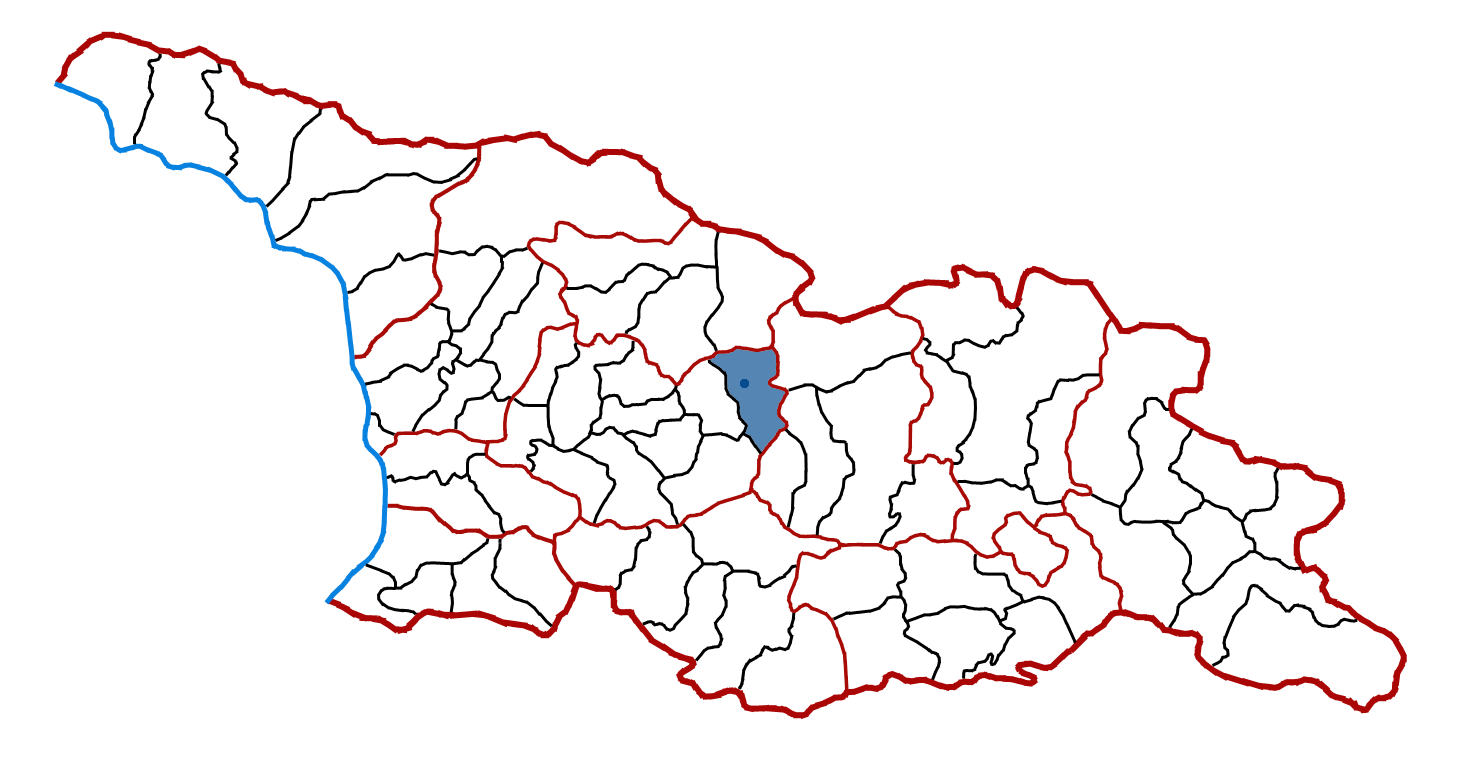
- Location of the municipality within Georgia
- Country: Georgia
- Region: Imereti
- Capital: Sachkhere

Government
  - Type: Mayor–Council
  - Mayor: Levan Ivanashvili (GD)
  - Municipal Assembly: 33 members: • Georgian Dream (30); • UNM (2); • For Georgia (1)

Area
  - Total: 973 km^{2} (376 sq mi)

Population (2014)
  - Total: 37.775

Population by ethnicity
  - Georgians: 99.8 %
  - Russians: 0.1 %
  - Others: 0.1 %
- Time zone: UTC+4 (Georgian Standard Time)

Sachkhere (Georgian: საჩხერის მუნიციპალიტეტი, romanized: sachkheris munitsip'alit'et'i) is a district of Georgia, in the region of Imereti. Its main town is Sachkhere. From the north, the municipality of Sachkhere is boarded by Oni and Ambrolauri Municipality, from the east – java and Kareli, from south – Khashuri and Kharagauli and from the west by Chiatura Municipality.

== Settlements ==
Rank	Settlement	Population
1	Sachkhere	6,140
2	Chorvila	1,451
3	Gorisa	1,087
4	Perevi	564

== Politics ==
Sachkhere Municipal Assembly (Georgian: საჩხერის საკრებულო, Sachkheris Sakrebulo) is a representative body in Sachkhere Municipality, consisting of 33 members and elected every four years. The last election was held in October 2021.

Party	2017	2021	Current Municipal Assembly
Georgian Dream	26	30	
United National Movement	1	2	
For Georgia		1	
European Georgia	1		
Alliance of Patriots	1		
Total	29	33	

== Gallery ==
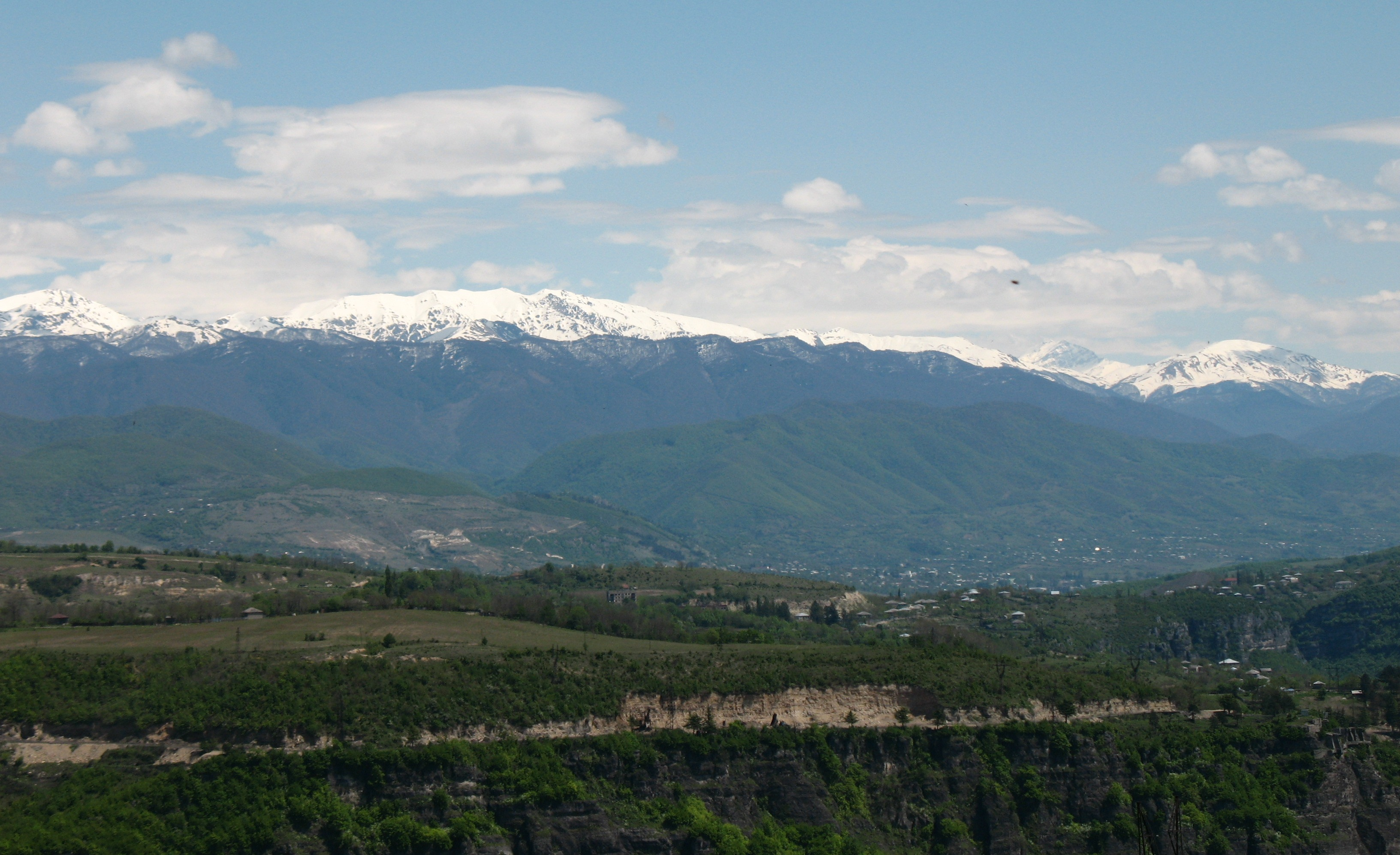

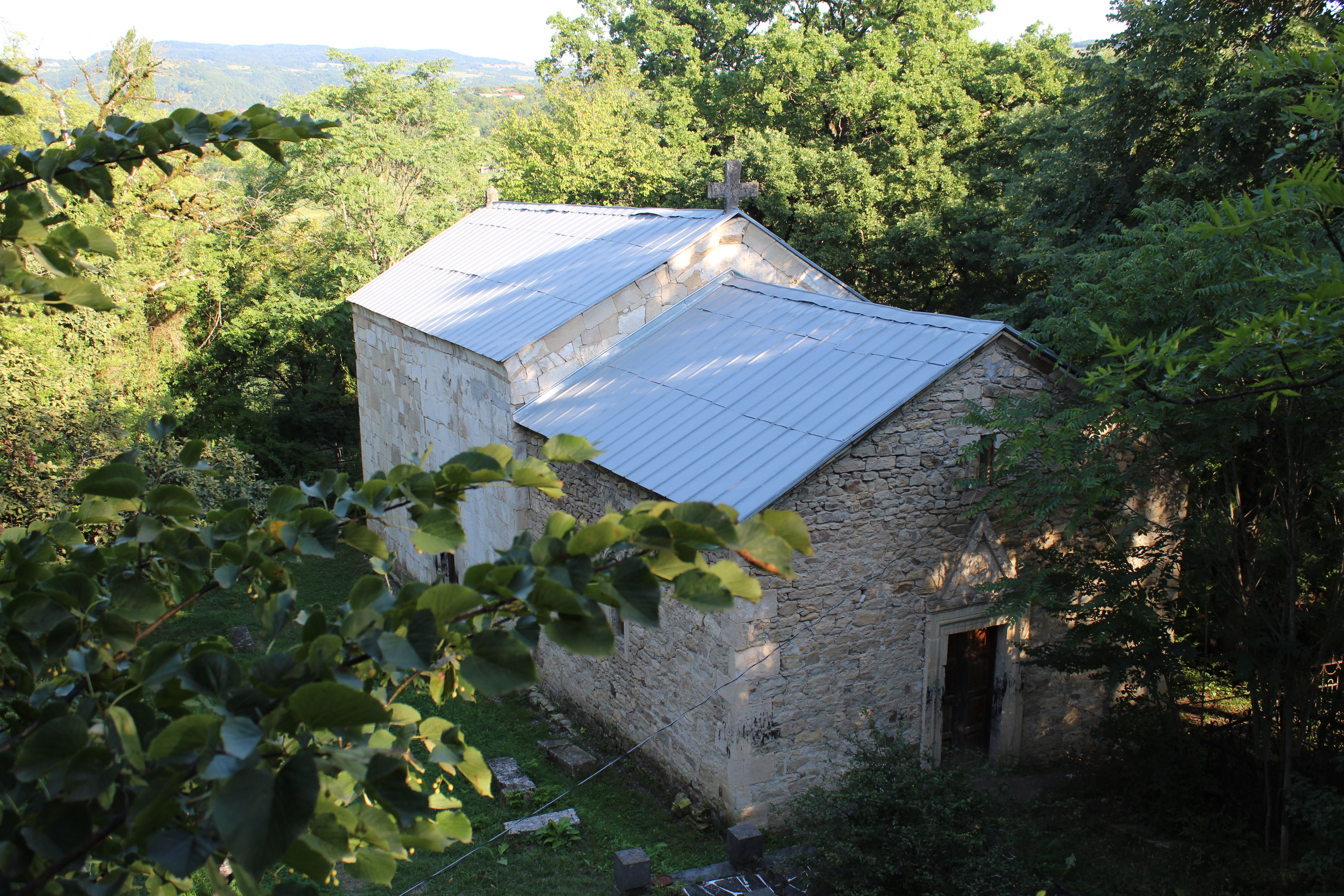

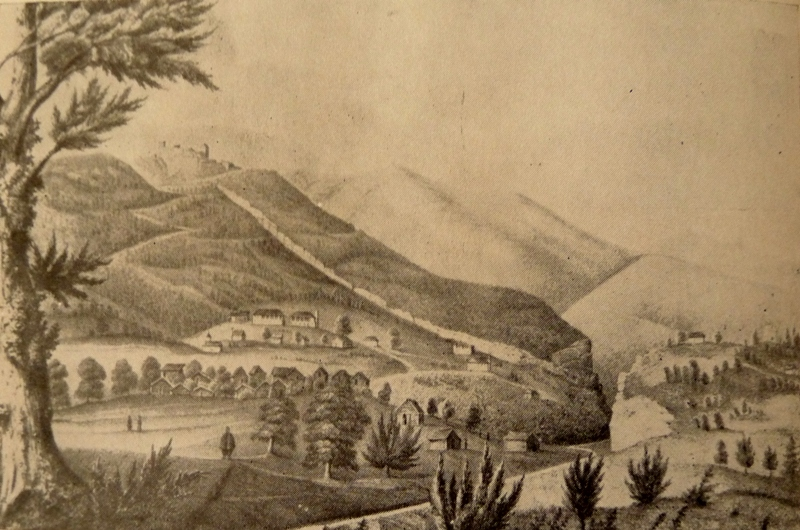

== See also ==
- List of municipalities in Georgia (country)
