= Rex A. Wade =

American historian and author (1936–2026)

- Born: Rex Arvin Wade; October 9, 1936; Piedmont, Kansas, U.S.
- Died: August 16, 2026 (aged 89)
- Occupations: Historian; author

Rex Arvin Wade (October 9, 1936 – August 16, 2026) was an American historian and author who wrote extensively about the 1917 Russian Revolution. He taught courses in Russian and Soviet history at George Mason University from 1986 until his death in 2026.

== Life and career ==
Rex Arvin Wade was born in Piedmont, Kansas, on October 9, 1936. He taught at Wisconsin State University, LaCrosse from 1963 to 1968, the University of Hawaiʻi from 1968 to 1986, and as visiting professor at the University of North Carolina, University of Nebraska–Lincoln, and Portland State University, before joining the George Mason faculty in 1986.

He authored numerous books on the subject of the 1917 February and October Revolutions, among which include:

- The Russian Search for Peace, 1917 (1969);
- Red Guards and Workers' Militias in the Russian Revolution (1984);
- The Russian Revolution, 1917 (2000);
- The Bolshevik Revolution and Russian Civil War (2001).
- Revolutionary Russia: New Approaches to the Russian Revolution of 1917 (2004).

Wade co-edited Politics and Society in Provincial Russia: Saratov, 1590–1917 (1989), and edited Documents of Soviet History (Vol. I, 1991; Vol. II, 1992, Vol. III, 1994).

He retired in 2006 but he was planning a book, The Long Revolution: Russia 1880–1930.

Wade died on August 16, 2026, at the age of 89.
