= Farmer to Farmer =

Program funded by the US Agency for International Development

The Farmer-to-Farmer (F2F) Program is funded by the United States Agency for International Development through the US Farm Bill to assist developing countries, middle-income countries, and emerging markets around the world to increase farm production and incomes. It promotes sustainable economic growth, food security and agricultural development worldwide. Volunteer technical assistance from US farmers, agribusinesses, cooperatives, and universities helps developing countries to improve productivity, access new markets, build local capacity, combat climate change and conserve environmental and natural resources. Farmer-to-Farmer also aims to increase the American public's understanding of international development issues and programs and international understanding of the US and US development programs.

Volunteers work on a wide range of activities to provide assistance requested by host organizations such as: private farmers, cooperatives, community groups, credit institutions, extension services, input supply firms, agribusinesses, and others. This people-to-people exchange promotes international goodwill, understanding of US foreign assistance programs, and private involvement in development activities.

== History ==
The Farmer-to-Farmer Worldwide Program was initially authorized by Congress in the 1985 Farm Bill and funded through Title V of Public Law 480. The 2014 Farm Bill designated the F2F Program as the "John Ogonowski and Doug Bereuter Farmer-to-Farmer Program." John Ogonowski was the pilot of one of the planes that crashed into the World Trade Center on September 11, 2001; the project's name honors his extensive work with immigrant Southeast Asian farmers using his land in rural Massachusetts. Retired Congressman Doug Bereuter was the initial sponsor of the program.

The Farmer-to-Farmer Program celebrated its 35th anniversary in 2020. More than 19,000 volunteers have served since 1985, assisting over 135 million people worldwide.

CNFA staff Nick Richie and Esborne Baraza speak to rice farmers at the Ahero rice project, 2005

== Volunteers ==
Farmer-to-Farmer volunteers are American farmers and agriculture experts dedicated to improving the world. Farmer-to-Farmer volunteers donate their time and expertise to provide technical skills to farmers in the developing world. Local F2F offices identify and work with hosts to design short-term, demand-driven assignments, provide logistics and translation services as needed, and follow up on implementation of volunteer recommendations. Farmer-to-Farmer volunteers serve across the globe, completing assignments involving technology transfer, business planning, organizational strengthening, marketing, and environmental conservation.

== Results ==
In the five-year program cycle running from 2013–2018, volunteers assisted their host organizations to increase annual sales by over $442 million and raise annual incomes by $75 million. The program leveraged volunteer time contributions worth over $28 million toward development efforts and mobilized $40 million from assisted local host organizations. The F2F Program trained approximately 163,000 people during this program cycle, and 41% of all individuals trained were women. Since program initiation, over 19,000 volunteer assignments have been completed in more than 115 countries.

== 2018-2023 program ==
USAID awarded cooperative agreements to eight organizations for implementation of the core F2F volunteer programs for international agricultural development for 2018-2023. The program extended services to 37 core countries, providing more than 3,000 volunteer technical assistance assignments averaging three weeks each. An additional Agricultural Volunteer Opportunity Project (AVOP) will fund volunteer activities with new implementing organizations and special activities. The eight program implementing organizations will work closely with overseas USAID missions and local partner organizations, supporting a variety of development programs aimed at reducing poverty and stimulating sustainable and broad-based economic growth. The core program agreements allow USAID country programs to provide additional funding for agricultural development projects using F2F volunteers.

Major areas of program focus are: horticulture, dairy and livestock, staple food crops, producer organization development, financial services, marketing and processing, agricultural education and training, and natural resources management.

=== Agricultural Volunteer Opportunity Project ===
Farmer-to-Farmer includes an Agricultural Volunteer Opportunity Project (AVOP) to test new approaches for use of volunteers, draw from non-traditional volunteer sources, develop capacity of non-traditional volunteer organizations, and address niche agricultural sector problems. Special projects are implemented by voluntary technical assistance organizations as sub-awards. Each sub-award is a full F2F program in a specific country or thematic area that helps to develop the capacity of the implementing organization to carry out larger-scale volunteer programs. Program oversight, mentoring, training, and program visits provided ensure sub-grant implementers are successful. AVOP also supports F2F core implementing partners through knowledge management and capacity development activities.

=== Countries with projects ===
ACDI VOCA

- Armenia – Food Safety; Rural Enterprise Development
- Georgia – Food Safety; Rural Enterprise Development
- Kyrgyzstan – Rural Enterprise Development; Agricultural Education and Training
- Tajikistan – Rural Enterprise Development

Catholic Relief Services

- Benin – Cashew, Soybeans
- Ethiopia – Livestock; Crops
- Nepal – Livestock; Crops
- Rwanda – Horticulture; Maize
- Timor-Leste – Modernizing Agriculture
- Uganda – Livestock; Agribusiness Development; Agricultural Education

CNFA

- Madagascar – Horticulture; Rice; Livestock; Aquaculture
- Malawi – Horticulture; Aquaculture; Legumes
- Moldova – Organic Agriculture; Livestock/Dairy
- Mozambique – Horticulture; Poultry; Service Sub-Sector
- Zambia – Horticulture; Legumes; Aquaculture
- Zimbabwe – Horticulture; Livestock/Dairy; Legumes

IESC

- Kenya – Access to Finance
- Sri Lanka – Access to Finance
- Tanzania – Access to Finance

Land O'Lakes Venture37

- Bangladesh – Food Safety and Quality
- Egypt – Food Safety and Quality
- Lebanon – Food Safety and Quality

NCBA CLUSA

- Ecuador – Coffee; Cacao
- Honduras – Coffee
- Peru – Coffee; Cacao

Partners of the Americas

- Colombia – Rural Enterprise Development
- Dominican Republic – Youth Development in Agriculture; Rural Adaptation and Resilience
- Guatemala – Rural Enterprise Development; Horticulture
- Guyana – Rural Enterprise Development; Horticulture
- Jamaica – Horticulture
- Myanmar – Agroforestry

Winrock International

- Ghana – Postharvest Strengthening
- Guinea – Agricultural Education and Training; Rural Livelihood Development
- Mali – Rural Livelihood Development
- Nigeria – Agricultural Education and Training
- Senegal – Agricultural Education and Training; Postharvest Strengthening

AVOP Sub-Awards

- Burkina Faso – Implemented by Browse and Grass Growers Cooperative: Livelihood Development
- Cambodia – Implemented by the University of Tennessee: Sustainable Intensification
- Morocco – Implemented by High Atlas Foundation: Sustainable Agriculture
- Philippines – Implemented by Grameen Foundation: Coconut
- Trinidad and Tobago – Implemented by Purdue University: Extension
