= St. Petersburg Workmen's Petition to the Tsar =

Petition of St. Petersburg workers and priest Georgy Gapon to the tsar

The St. Petersburg Workmen's Petition to the Tsar (January 22, 1905)
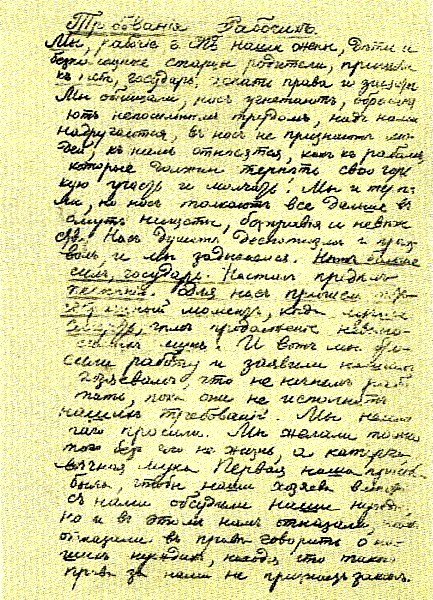
- Created: 6-8 January 1905
- Author: Georgy Gapon
- Signatories: Assembly of Russian factory workmen of St. Petersburg
- Purpose: Limiting the power of government officials, introduction of popular representation

The St. Petersburg Workmen's Petition to the Tsar is a historical document and petition with which St. Petersburg workers, led by the priest Georgy Gapon, marched to Tsar Nicholas II on Bloody Sunday, January 9 (22), 1905. The petition was made up on January 5–8, 1905 by Georgy Gapon and a group of workers — leaders of the "Assembly of Russian Factory Workmen of St. Petersburg" (hereinafter — "Sobranie") with the participation of representatives of the democratic intelligentsia. The petition contained a number of demands, some of them political, some of them economic. The main demands of the petition were the removal of officials' power and popular representation in the form of a constituent assembly on the basis of universal, direct, secret and equal suffrage. The other demands of the petition were divided into three parts: "Measures against the ignorance and powerlessness of the Russian people", "Measures against the poverty of the people", and "Measures against the oppression of capital over labor". There were seventeen demands in total. The political demands of the petition, which proposed to limit the tsarist autocracy, were considered "impertinent" by the government, which therefore dispersed the workers' protests.

== Background ==
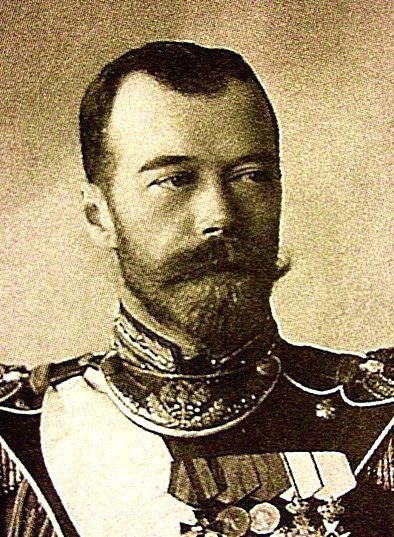
Emperor Nicholas II

The practice of petitioning the authorities dates back to ancient times. In the Middle Ages, such petitions were often called by the Latin word "petition", which later entered the Russian language. In Russia, such petitions were traditionally called "Chelobitnaya" (from the expression "to beat the earth with the forehead" — to give an earthly bow). In the 16-17th centuries the practice of sending petitions to the authorities became widespread. For their consideration in the Russian kingdom was created a special order. According to the historian N. P. Pavlov-Silvansky, the petition of January 9, 1905 had as its prototype the "mundane" petitions of the 17th century.

It was the priest Georgy Gapon who had the idea of petitioning the Tsar about the people's needs. Grigory Gapon, a graduate of the St. Petersburg Theological Academy, had been the head of the largest legal workers' organization, the "Assembly of Russian Factory Workmen of St. Petersburg" since 1903. Created under the auspices of the St. Petersburg city government and police department, the Sobranie was designed to unite workers for education and mutual aid, thus weakening the influence of revolutionary propaganda on them. However, deprived of proper control by the authorities, the Sobranie soon deviated from its goals. At workers' meetings, they began to openly discuss not only ways to improve their daily lives, but also ways for workers to fight for their rights. Among these ways were strikes, walkouts and more radical methods.

The idea of petitioning the tsar was first expressed by G. Gapon in early 1904. In his memoirs he recalled that this idea was inspired by conversations with E. A. Naryshkina, a lady-in-waiting at the court of Tsar Nicholas II. According to her, Nicholas II was a kind and honest man, but he lacked firmness of character. In his imagination, Gapon created the image of an ideal tsar who had no opportunity to show himself, but from whom alone one could expect to save Russia. Gapon wrote: "I thought, that when the moment came, he would show himself in his true light, listen to his people, and make them happy". According to Menshevik A. A. Sukhov, as early as March 1904 Gapon was eagerly developing his idea in meetings with workers. "The people are hindered by the officials, " Gapon said, "and with the tsar the people will agree. Only it is necessary to achieve it not by force, but by petition, in the old-fashioned way". At about the same time, he expressed the idea of appealing to the tsar collectively, "the whole world". "It is necessary for all of us to ask," he said at a meeting of workers. - We will go peacefully, and we will be heard".

== The March "Program of Five" ==
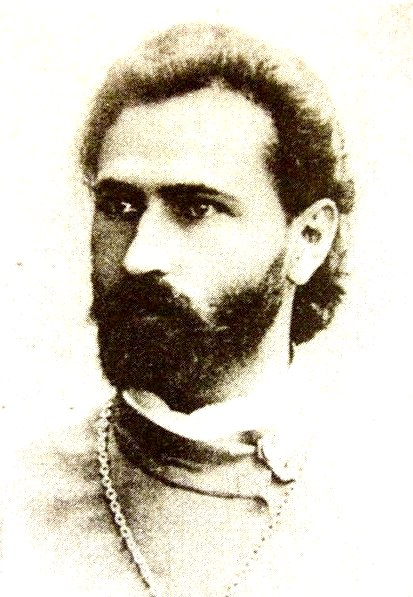
Priest Georgy Gapon

The first draft of the petition was written by Gapon in March 1904 and is known in historical literature as the "Program of Five". By the end of 1903, Gapon had already established relations with an influential group of workers from Vasilievsky Island, known as the "Karelin group". Many of them had come through Social Democratic circles, but had tactical differences with the Social Democratic Party. In an effort to attract workers to work in his "Sobranie," Gapon convinced them that the purpose of the "Sobranie" was the real struggle of the workers for their rights. However, the workers were greatly confused by Gapon's connection with the police department, and they could not overcome their distrust of the mysterious priest for a long time. In order to find out Gapon's political face, the workers invited him to express his views directly. "Why don't you comrades help?" — Gapon would often ask them, to which the workers would reply: "Georgy Apollonovich, who are you, tell us and maybe we could be your comrades, because so far we know nothing about you".

In March 1904, Gapon gathered four workers in his apartment, and after taking their word to keep the subject of discussion secret, he outlined his program to them. The workers who took part in this meeting were A. E. Karelin, D. V. Kuzin, I. V. Vasiliev, and N. M. Varnashyov. According to the story of I. I. Pavlov, Karelin once again asked Gapon to reveal his cards. "Yes, finally, tell us, Father Georgy, who you are and what you are. What is your program and tactics, and where and why are you leading us?" — "Who and what I am," Gapon objected, "I have already told you, but where and why I am leading you ... here, look," and Gapon threw on the table a paper written in red ink, listing point by point the needs of the working people. This was the draft of the petition of 1905, and at that time it was considered the program of the leading circle of the Sobranie. The draft contained three groups of demands: I. Measures against the ignorance and powerlessness of the Russian people; II. Measures against the poverty of the people; and III. Measures against the oppression of capital over labor, — and subsequently formed the whole of the first edition of the Gapon Petition.

After familiarizing themselves with the text of the program, the workers came to the conclusion that it was acceptable to them. "We were astonished," recalled A. E. Karelin. — After all, I was still a Bolshevik, I had not broken with the party, I was helping it, cleaning it up; Kuzin was a Menshevik. Varnashyov and Vasiliev, although they were nonpartisans, were honest, loyal, good, understanding people. And here we all saw that what Gapon wrote was broader than the Social-Democrats. Here we realized that Gapon was an honest man, and we believed him". N. M. Varnashyov added in his memoirs that "for none of those gathered was the program a surprise, because Gapon was partly forced by them to develop it". Asked by the workers how he intended to make his program public, Gapon replied that he did not intend do so, but first intended to expand the activities of his "Sobranie" to include as many people as possible. With thousands and tens of thousands of people in its ranks, the "Assembly" will become such a force that both the capitalists and the government will have to reckon with it. If an economic strike arose on the basis of general discontent, it would then be possible to make political demands on the government. The workmen accepted the plan.

After this incident, Gapon was able to overcome the distrust of the radical workers, and they agreed to help him. After Karelin and his comrades joined the ranks of "Sobranie", they agitated among the masses to join Gapon's society, and their numbers began to grow. At the same time, the "Karelians" continued to make sure that Gapon did not deviate from the planned program and reminded him of his commitments at every opportunity.

== Zemstvo petition campaign ==
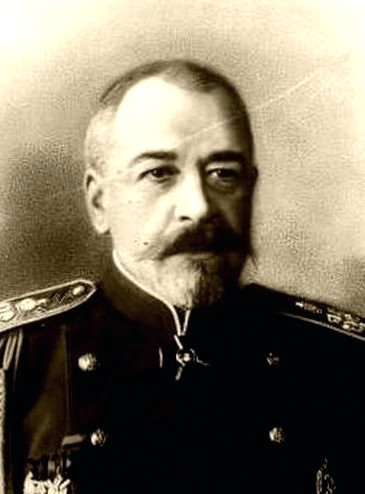
Minister of the Interior Pyotr Svyatopolk-Mirsky

In the fall of 1904, with the appointment of P. D. Svyatopolk-Mirsky as Minister of Internal Affairs, a political awakening began in the country, which became known as the "Svyatopolk-Mirsky Spring". During this period, the activities of liberal forces, demanding the restriction of autocracy and the introduction of the constitution, intensified. At the head of the liberal opposition stood the "Union of Liberation", created in 1903, which united a wide range of intellectuals and zemstvo workers. On the initiative of the Union of Liberation, a large-scale campaign of zemstvo petitions was launched in November 1904. Zemstvo and other public institutions addressed the highest authorities with petitions or resolutions calling for the introduction of political freedoms and popular representation in the country. An example of such a resolution was the Resolution of the Zemstvo Congress held in St. Petersburg on November 6–9, 1904. Due to the relaxation of censorship allowed by the government, the texts of Zemstvo petitions penetrated into the press and became the subject of public discussion. The general political upsurge began to affect the mood of the workers. "In our circles, everything was listened to, and everything that was going on worried us a lot, — recalled one of the workers. — Some fresh air turned our heads, and one meeting succeeded another". In Gapon's entourage began to talk about the need for the workers to join the common voice of all Russia.

In the same month, the leaders of the St. Petersburg Union of Liberation established contact with the leadership of the Assembly of Russian Factory Workers. In early November 1904, a group of representatives of the Union of Liberation met with Georgy Gapon and the Sobranie leadership. The meeting was attended by E. D. Kuskova, S. N. Prokopovich, V. Y. Yakovlev-Bogucharsky, and two others. They suggested that Gapon and his workers join the general campaign and petition the authorities with a petition similar to that of the representatives of the zemstvo. Gapon enthusiastically embraced the idea and promised to use all his influence to push it through at the workers' meetings. At the same time, Gapon and his colleagues insisted on submitting their own special workers' petition. The workers had a strong desire "to offer their own, from the base," recalled A. E. Karelin, a participant in the meeting. During the meeting, the "liberationists," reviewing the charter of Gapon's "assembly," drew attention to some of its dubious paragraphs. In response, Gapon declared "that the charter was only a screen, that the real program of the society was different, and asked the workers to bring a resolution of a political nature that they had worked out. This was the "Program of the Five" of March. "Even then," recalled one of the participants in the meeting, "it was clear that these resolutions coincided with those of the intellectuals". After familiarizing themselves with Gapon's program, the "liberationists" stressed the pertinence of such a petition. "Well, it's a something, it'll cause a lot of noise and be a great upsurge," said Prokopovich, "but only you will be arrested. — "Well then!" — replied the workers.

On November 28, 1904, a meeting of the department heads of the Gapon Society was held at which Gapon proposed the idea of a workers' petition. The meeting was to adopt the "Program of Five" as a petition or resolution for a public statement of workers' demands. The participants of the meeting were asked to weigh the seriousness of the step to be taken and the responsibility to be assumed, and in case of "non-sympathy" to calmly step aside and give their word of honor to remain silent. At the end of the meeting it was decided to draw up a working petition, the form and content of which was left to Gapon's discretion. The chairman of the meeting, N. M. Varnashyov, in his memoirs calls this event "a conspiracy to speak". After this meeting, the leaders of the "Sobranie" agitated the masses for a speech with political demands. "We deafly introduced the idea of speaking with a petition at every meeting, in every department," — recalled A. E. Karelin. At the workers' meetings the zemstvo petitions printed in the newspapers began to be read and discussed, and the leaders of the "Sobranie" gave them an interpretation, connecting the political demands with the economic needs of the workers.

== Fight for the petition submission ==
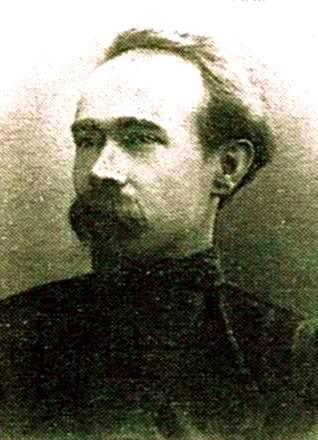
A workman Aleksei Karelin

In December 1904, the leadership of the "Sobranie" discussed the issue of petitioning. A part of the leadership, led by Gapon, seeing the possible failure of the campaign of zemstvo petitions, began to postpone the petition for the future. D. V. Kuzin and N. M. Varnashyov joined him. Gapon was sure that submitting a petition that was not supported by a mass uprising would only lead to the closure of the "Sobranie" and the arrest of its leaders. In conversations with workers, he declared that the petition was "a dead matter, condemned to death in advance" and called supporters of immediate petitioning "stenographers". As an alternative, Gapon proposed to expand the activities of the Sobranie, extending its influence to other cities, and only then to make his demands. He originally planned the speech to coincide with the expected fall of Port Arthur but later moved it to February 19, the anniversary of the emancipation of the peasants under Alexander II.

Opposing Gapon, another part of the leadership, led by A. E. Karelin and I. V. Vasiliev, insisted on a quick petition. They were joined by the internal "opposition" to Gapon in the "Sobranie", represented by Karelin's group, and by workers who had a more radical way of thinking. This group of workers was actively supported by the intellectuals of the Union of Liberation. One of the propagandists of the idea of a petition was the assistant lawyer I. M. Finkel, who lectured on the labor question in the Sobranie. As a non-partisan, Finkel was associated with the St. Petersburg Mensheviks and the left wing of the Union of Liberation, and in his speeches he told the workers: "Zemtsy, lawyers and other public figures write and submit petitions with their demands, while the workers remain indifferent. If they do not do this, others who have received something in response to their demands will not remember the workers, and they will be left with nothing".

Concerned about Finkel's growing influence, Gapon demanded that he and other intellectuals be removed from the meetings of the Sobranie leadership circle, and in conversations with the workers began to turn them against the intelligentsia. "The intellectuals are shouting only because of the fact that to seize power, and after and sit on our neck and on the muzhik, — Gapon convinced them. — It will be worse than autocracy". In response, the supporters of the petition decided to act in their own way. According to the memoirs of I. I. Pavlov, the opposition formed a group. Pavlov and the opposition formed a conspiracy to "topple Gapon from his pedestal as the 'leader of the workers'". It was decided that if Gapon refused to speak with the petition, the opposition would go to speak without him. The conflict in the leadership of the "Sobranie" escalated to the extreme, but was stopped by the events connected with the Putilov strike.

== Workers' economic demands ==
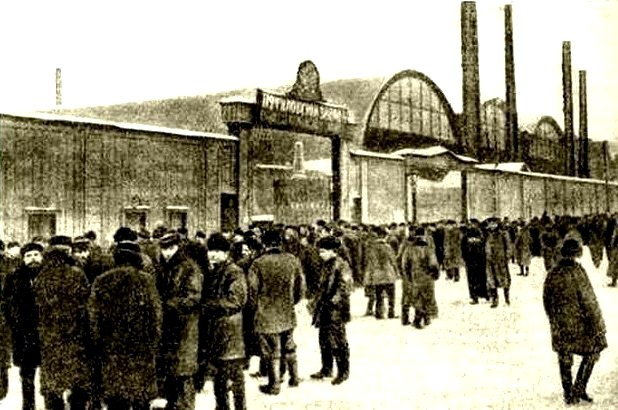
Striking workers at the gates of the Kirov Plant

In December 1904 there was an incident at the Putilov factory when four workers who were members of Gapon's "Sobranie" were dismissed. At first this event was not seen as particularly important, but then a rumor spread that the workers had been fired because of their membership in the "Sobranie". This was perceived by the capitalists as a challenge to the Sobranie, and at an emergency meeting on December 27, 1904, on Vasilyevsky Island, the leadership of the Sobranie decided to demand the reinstatement of the dismissed workers. If the demands were not met, it was decided to declare a strike at the Putilov factory and, if necessary, to extend it to all the factories in St. Petersburg. The question of a petition was also raised at the meeting, and after heated discussions it was decided to issue a petition only if the workers' economic demands were not met. The decisive speech was made by A.E. Karelin, who declared that by submitting a petition the workers would rid themselves of the reputation of being "Zubatovites". From that moment the conflict between Gapon and the opposition disappeared, and everyone united in the struggle of the factory workers against the factory owners. Gapon himself expected that the workers' demands would be met and that the matter would not come to having to submit a petition.

The demand that the fired workers be rehired was not met and on January 3 a strike was announced at the Putilov factory. On January 5, the strike spread to other factories in St. Petersburg, and by January 7, the strike had spread to all St. Petersburg factories and turned into a general strike. The initial demand for the reinstatement of the dismissed workers was replaced by a list of broad economic demands addressed to the management of the enterprises and factories. Under the conditions of the strike, each factory and workshop began to formulate its own economic demands and present them to its administration. In order to unify the demands of different factories and plants, the Sobranie leadership compiled a standardized list of economic demands of the working class. The list was reproduced by hectograph, and in this form and signed by Gapon, it was distributed to all the enterprises of St. Petersburg. On January 4, Gapon, at the head of a deputation of workers, went to the director of the Putilov factory, S. I. Smirnov, and acquainted him with the list of demands. In other factories, deputations of workers presented similar lists of demands to their managements.

The standard list of the workers' economic demands included such items as: an eight-hour working day; setting the prices of products in cooperation with the workers and with their consent; the establishment of a joint commission with the workers to deal with the workers' claims and complaints against the administration; an increase in the wages of women and workers to one ruble a day; the abolition of overtime; respectful treatment of workers by medical personnel; improvement of sanitary conditions in the workshops, etc. Later, all these demands were reproduced in "The Workers' Demands". Their statement was preceded by the words: "We asked for little, we wanted only that without which life is not life, but penal servitude, eternal torment". The unwillingness of the factory owners to meet these demands motivated the decision to petition the tsar and established the political significance of the petition.

== The workmen's resolution on their urgent needs ==
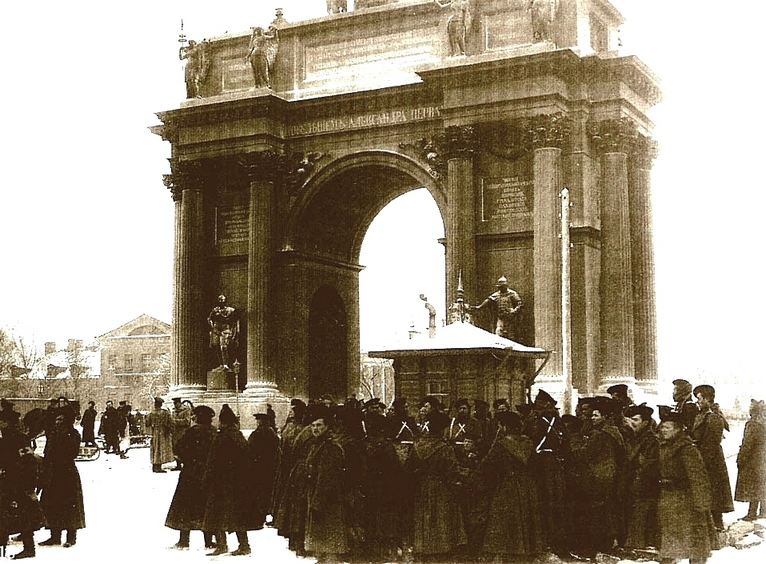
Soldiers at the Triumphal Arch of Narva on the eve of January 9

On January 4, it finally became clear to Gapon and his Sobranie that the factory owners would not meet the economic demands and that the strike was lost, and a losing strike was a disaster for Gapon's sobranie. It was clear that the working masses would not forgive the leaders for unmet expectations, and that the government would close the Sobranie and repress its leadership. According to factory inspector S. P. Chizhov, Gapon found himself in the position of a man who had nowhere to retreat. In this situation, Gapon and his assistants decided on an extreme measure—to take the path of politics and seek help from the Tsar himself.

On January 5, Gapon told one of the Sobranie sections that the factory owners were gaining the upper hand over the workers because they had the bureaucratic government on their side. Therefore, the workers must appeal directly to the tsar and demand that he eliminate the bureaucratic "intermediary" between himself and his people. "When the existing government turns its back on us at a critical moment in our lives, when it not only fails to help us, but even takes the side of the businessmen," Gapon said, "then we must demand the destruction of such a political system, in which only disenfranchisement falls to our lot. And from now on, our slogan should be: 'Down with the bureaucratic government". From that moment on, the strike took on a political character, and the question of formulating political demands came on the agenda. It was clear that the supporters of the petition had gained the upper hand, and all that remained was to prepare it and present it to the tsar. From January 4–5, Gapon, who had previously opposed the immediate submission of the petition, became an active supporter of it.

That same day, Gapon set about preparing a petition. According to the agreement, the petition was to be based on the March "Program of Five," which expressed the general demands of the working class and had long been considered the secret program of Gapon's "assembly". The "Program of Five" was first made public and read at workers' meetings as a draft petition or resolution for an appeal. On January 5, the "Program of Five" was first published and read at workers' meetings as a draft petition or resolution for an appeal to the tsar. The program, however, had one significant drawback: it contained only a list of workers' demands without any preface or explanation. It was necessary to supplement the list with a text describing the plight of the workers and the motives that led them to address their demands to the tsar. To this end, Gapon approached several intellectuals and invited them to write a draft of such a text.

The first person Gapon approached was the well-known journalist and writer S. Y. Stechkin, who wrote in "Russkaya Gazeta" under the pseudonym of N. Stroev. On January 5, Stechkin gathered in his apartment on Gorokhovaya Street a group of party intellectuals from among the Mensheviks. According to the memoirs of I. I. Pavlov, Gapon appeared at the apartment on Gorokhovaya and said that "events are unfolding with astonishing speed, the march to the Palace is inevitable, and I still have only everything ...". — With these words he threw on the table three sheets of paper written in red ink. It was the draft of a petition, or rather the same "Program of the Five" that had been kept unchanged since March 1904. After studying the draft, the Mensheviks declared that such a petition was unacceptable to the Social-Democrats. In response, Gapon suggested that they amend it or write their own version of the petition. At the same time, the Mensheviks, together with Stechkin, drew up their own draft of the petition, called "The Workmen's resolution on their urgent needs". This text, in the spirit of the party program, was read in several sections of the "Sobranie" that same day, and several thousand signatures were collected endorsing it. Its central point was the demand for the convocation of a Constituent Assembly; it also contained demands for political amnesty, an end to the war, and the nationalization of factories, plants, and land.

== Writing Gapon's Petition ==
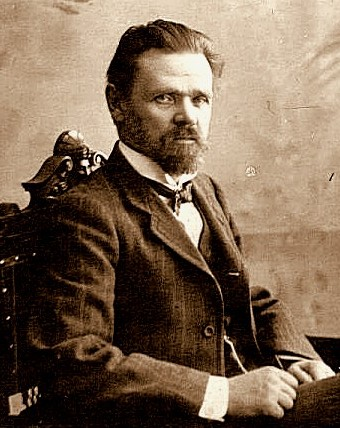
Historian Vasily Bogucharsky

The Mensheviks' "The Workmen's resolution on their urgent needs" did not satisfy Gapon. The resolution was written in a dead and businesslike way, it lacked an appeal to the tsar, and its demands were categorical. As an experienced preacher, Gapon knew that the language of party revolutionaries did not resonate with the common people. That is why on the same days, January 5–6, he appealed to three other intellectuals with a proposal to write a draft petition: one of the leaders of the "Union of Liberation", V. Yakovlev-Bogucharsky, the writer and ethnographer V. G. Bogoraz, and the journalist of the newspaper "Our Days", A. I. Matyushensky. The historian V. Y. Yakovlev-Bogucharsky, who received the draft of the petition of January 6 from Gapon, refused to make any changes, arguing that at least 7,000 signatures of workers had already been collected. Later, the historian recalled these events, referring to himself in the third person:

"On January 6, at 7 or 8 o'clock in the evening, one of the liberationists known to Gapon (we'll call him NN), having received information that Gapon was giving workers to sign a petition, went to the department on the Vyborg side, where he met Gapon. Gapon immediately gave NN the petition, told him that 7000 signatures had already been collected (many workers continued to add their signatures in NN's presence), and asked him to edit the petition and make any changes that NN deemed necessary. When NN took the petition home and read it carefully, NN became quite convinced, as he now insists in the strongest terms, that the petition was only a development of the theses that NN had seen written by Gapon as early as November 1904. The petition really needed changes, but in view of the fact that the signatures of the workers had already been collected under it, NN and his comrades did not feel entitled to make even the slightest changes in it. Therefore, the petition was returned to Gapon (at Tserkvonnaya, 6) the next day (January 7) at 12 noon in the exact form in which it had been received from Gapon the day before".

Two other intellectuals who received the draft of the petition were more cooperative than Bogucharsky. According to some sources, one version of the text was written by V. G. Tanom-Bogoraz, but both its content and its fate remained unknown. The last version of the text was written by the journalist A. I. Matyushensky, an employee of "Our Days". Matyushensky was known as the author of articles on the life of Baku workers and the Baku workers' strike. On January 6, he published in the newspapers his interview with S. I. Smirnov, the director of the Putilov factory, which attracted Gapon's attention. Some sources claim that it was Matyushensky's text that Gapon used as the basis for his petition. Matyushensky himself later claimed that the petition was written by him, but historians have a lot of doubts about this statement.

According to the researcher of the petition A. Shilov, its text is written in the style of church rhetoric, which clearly points to the authorship of Gapon, who was accustomed to such sermons and speeches. Gapon's authorship is also proved by the testimonies of the participants of the events of January 9. Thus, the worker V. A. Yanov, chairman of the Narva branch of the "Assembly," when asked by the investigator about the petition, replied: "It was written by Gapon's hand, it was always with him, and he often rewrote it". The chairman of the Kolomna section of the "Assembly", I. M. Kharitonov, who was not separated from Gapon in the days before January 9, claimed that it was written by Gapon, and Matyushensky only corrected the style at the beginning and end of the text. And the treasurer of the "Assembly" A. E. Karelin in his memoirs pointed out that the petition was written in the characteristic Gapon syllable: "This Gapon syllable is special. It is a simple, clear, precise syllable that touches the soul, like his voice". It is possible, however, that Gapon used Matyushensky's draft when composing his text, but there is no direct evidence of this.

In any case, on the night of January 6–7, Gapon, having familiarized himself with the options proposed to him by the intellectuals, rejected them all and wrote his own version of the petition, which went down in history as the Petition of January 9, 1905. The petition was based on the March "Program of the Five", which was included in the first version of the text without any changes. An extensive preface was added at the beginning, containing an appeal to the tsar, a description of the workers' plight, their unsuccessful struggle with the factory workers, a demand to abolish the power of officials and to introduce popular representation in the form of a constituent assembly. And at the end there was an appeal to the tsar to go to the people and accept the petition. This text was read in the sections of the Sobranie on January 7, 8 and 9, and tens of thousands of signatures were collected. During the discussion of the petition on January 7 and 8, some changes and additions were made, and the final text of the petition took on a more popular character. On January 8, this final, edited text of the petition was typewritten in a number of 12 copies: one for Gapon himself and one each for the 11 departments of the "Sobranie". With this text of the petition, the workers went to the tsar on January 9, 1905. One of the copies of the text, signed by Gapon and the worker I.V. Vasiliev, was later kept in the Leningrad Museum of the Revolution.

== Petition structure and content ==
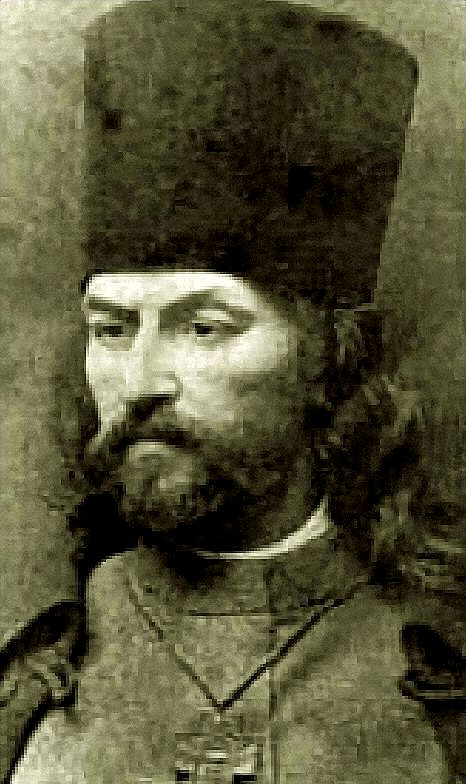
Priest Georgy Gapon

The text of Gapon's petition was divided into three parts. The first part began with an address to the tsar. In accordance with biblical and old Rus’ tradition, the petition addressed the tsar to inform him that the workers and residents of St. Petersburg had come to him seeking truth and protection. The petition went on to speak of the plight and slavery of the workers, who were forced to endure their bitter plight in silence, of their poverty and oppression, and it was also said that the situation of the workers was getting worse and worse, and now their patience was at an end. "For us, the terrible moment has come when it is better to die than to continue in unbearable agony".

The petition then recounted the history of the workers' dispute with the factory owners, commonly referred to as the bosses. It recounted how the workers had walked off the job and told their owners that they would not work until their demands were met. This was followed by a list of demands that the workers had made to their bosses during the January strike. It was said that these demands were minor, but the owners refused to meet them as well. The petition went on to state that the reason for the refusal was that the workers' demands were recognized as not being in accordance with the law. It was said that from the owners' point of view, any request by the workers was a crime, and their desire to improve their situation was an intolerable impertinence.

The petition also revealed its main thesis — the workmen's disenfranchisement as the main cause of their oppression by their masters. It was claimed that the workers, like all the Russian people, were not recognized as having any human rights, not even the right to speak, to think, to assemble, to discuss their needs and to take measures to improve their situation. The repression of those who spoke in defense of the interests of the working class was mentioned. The petition then included an appeal to the tsar, pointing out the divine origin of royal authority and the contradiction between human and divine laws. It was argued that the existing laws contradicted the divine regulations, that they were unjust, that it was impossible for ordinary people to live under them. "Is it not better to die, to die all of us, the working people of all Russia? Let the capitalists and officials —the common thieves, the robbers of the Russian people— live and enjoy themselves. Finally, the cause of unjust laws was also pointed out— the domination of officials who usurped power and became a middleman between the tsar and his people.

In the second part the demands with which the workers came to the walls of the tsar's palace were presented. The main demand of the workers was the destruction of the power of the officials, who had become a wall between the tsar and his people, and the participation of the people in the management of the state. It was said that Russia was too big and its needs too diverse and numerous for officials alone to manage. It was concluded that popular representation was necessary. "It is necessary that the people should help themselves, for they alone know their true needs". The tsar was urged to immediately summon popular representatives from all classes and all estates: workers, capitalists, officials, clergy, intellectuals-to elect a constituent assembly on the basis of universal, direct, secret and universal suffrage. This demand was declared to be the main demand of the workers, "in and on which everything rests", and the main remedy for their sore wounds.

The demand for popular representation was followed by a list of additional demands necessary "to heal the wounds of the people. This list was an outline of the March "Program of Five," which was included in the first edition of the petition without changes. The list consisted of three sections:

1. Measures against the ignorance and powerlessness of the Russian people;
2. Measures against the poverty of the people;
3. Measures against the oppression of capital over labor.

The first paragraph —"Measures against ignorance and disenfranchisement of the Russian people"— consisted of the following points: personal freedom, freedom of speech, freedom of the press, freedom of assembly, freedom of thought in matters of religion; universal and compulsory public education at public expense; responsibility of officials before the people and guarantee of the legality of the administration; equality before the law for all without exception; immediate amnesty of all those who had suffered for their beliefs. The second paragraph —"Measures against the Poverty of the People"— included the following points: abolition of indirect taxes and their replacement by direct, progressive and income taxes; abolition of redemption payments, cheap credit and gradual transfer of land to the people. Finally, the third paragraph, "Measures against the oppression of capital over labor", included the following points: occupational safety and health; freedom of consumer-productive and professional trade unions; an eight-hour workday and rationing of overtime; freedom of labor to struggle against capital; participation of representatives of the working class in drafting a bill on state insurance for workers; and normal wages.

In the second and final version of the petition, with which the workers went to the tsar on January 9, several more points were added to these demands, in particular: the separation of church and state; the execution of military and naval orders in Russia, not abroad; the cessation of war at the will of the people; the abolition of the institution of factory inspectors. As a result, the total number of demands increased to 17, and some of the demands were strengthened by adding the word "immediately".

The list of demands was followed by the final part of the petition. It contained another appeal to the tsar to accept the petition and fulfill its demands, and the tsar was asked not only to accept them, but also to swear to fulfill them. "Command them and swear to fulfill them, and you will make Russia happy and glorious, and engrave your name in the hearts of ours and our descendants forever". The workers expressed their willingness to die on the walls of the Winter Palace if the tsar did not meet their demands. "And if you do not order us, if you do not answer our plea, we will die here, in this square, in front of your palace. We have nowhere else to go and no reason to go! We have only two ways — either to freedom and happiness, or to the grave". This part ended with an expression of readiness to sacrifice one's life for the suffering Russia, and with the assertion that the workers were not sorry for this sacrifice and were willing to make it.

== Reading and recall of signatures ==
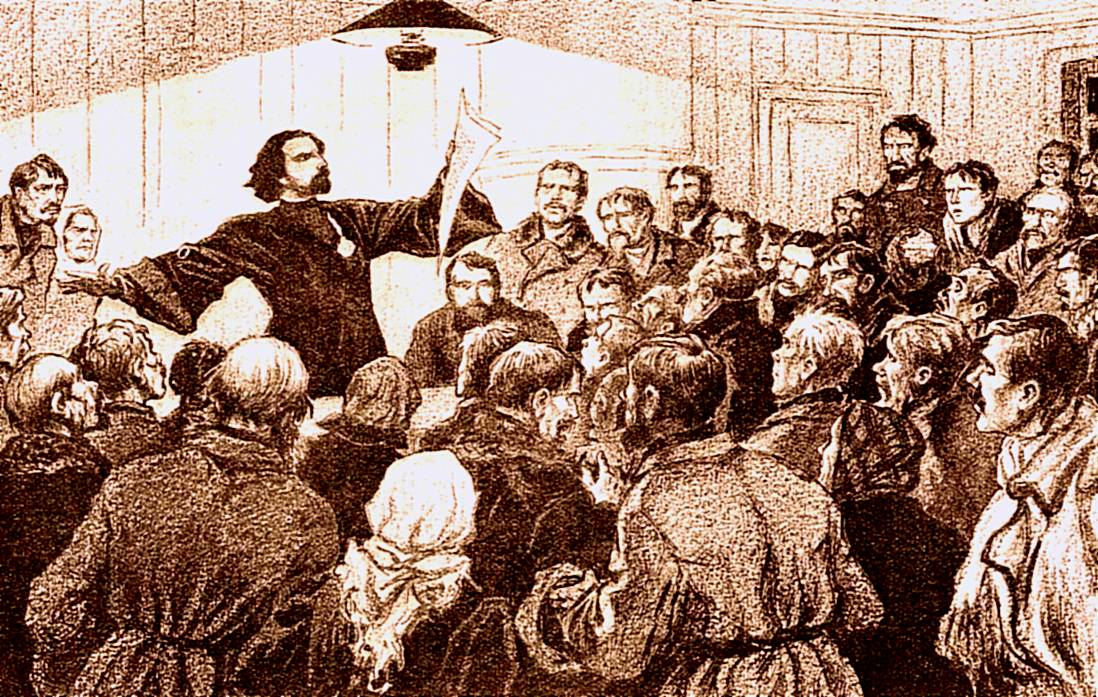
"Gapon reading a petition among workmen." Drawing by an unknown artist.

Beginning on January 7, Gapon's petition was read in all the departments of the Sobranie. At that time there were 11 departments of the Sobranie in St. Petersburg: Vyborgsky, Narva, Vasileostrovsky, Kolomensky, Rozhdestvensky, Petersburg, Nevsky, Moskovsky, Gavanovsky, Kolpinsky, and on the Obvodnoy Channel. In some departments the petition was read by Gapon himself, in others by department heads, their assistants, and ordinary "Sobranie" activists. In those days Gapon's departments became a place of mass pilgrimage for St. Petersburg workers. People came from all districts to listen to speeches in which for the first time in their lives political wisdom was revealed to them in simple words. In those days a large number of orators emerged from the working class who were able to speak in a language that the masses could understand. People flocked to the departments, listened to the petition, added their signatures, and then left to make way for others. The departments became the centers of working life in St. Petersburg. According to eyewitnesses, the city resembled a mass meeting, where there was such freedom of speech as St. Petersburg had never seen before.

The reading of the petition usually proceeded as follows. The next group was let into the hall, and then one person gave a speech and another started reading the petition. When the reading reached the specific points of the petition, the speaker would give a detailed interpretation of each point and then address the audience with the question, "Right, comrades? — "Right! .... So!..." — the crowd replied with joy. In cases where the crowd did not give a unanimous answer, the point in question was interpreted again and again until the crowd agreed. Then the next clause was interpreted, then the third, and so on until the end. When agreement had been reached on all points, the orator would read the last part of the petition, which expressed the workers' willingness to die on the walls of the royal palace if their demands were not met. He then addressed the audience with the question, "Are you prepared to stand for these demands to the end? Are you ready to die for them? Do you swear to do so?" — And the crowd responded with a chorus: "We swear it! We'll all die as one!" Such scenes took place in all sections of the Sobranie. According to numerous testimonies, there was an atmosphere of religious exaltation in the sections: people were crying, beating their fists against the walls and swearing to come to the square and die for truth and freedom.

The greatest excitement was where Gapon himself spoke. He travelled through all the departments of the "Sobranie", dominated the audience, read and interpreted the petition. At the end of reading the petition, he said that if the tsar did not come to the workers and accept the petition, he would no longer be the tsar: "Then I will be the first to say that we have no tsar". Gapon's speeches were expected. Gapon's speeches were awaited for many hours in the bitter cold. In the Nevsky department, where he arrived on the evening of January 7, a crowd of many thousands had gathered, which could not fit into the department room. Gapon, together with the chairman of the department, went out into the yard, stood on a water tank, and by the light of torches began to interpret the petition. The crowd of many thousands of workers listened in sepulchral silence, afraid to miss a single word of the orator. When Gapon finished reading, he said, "Let our lives be a sacrifice for suffering Russia. We are not sorry for this sacrifice, we make it freely!" - the whole crowd roared as one: "Let it happen!... No piety!... Let's die for Russia!" And after the words that if the tsar did not accept the workers, "we do not need such a tsar," there was a roar of many thousands: "Yes!...! No!..."

Similar scenes occurred in all departments of the "Sobranie", through which tens of thousands of people passed at that time. An elderly spokesman said in the Vasileostrovsky department: "Comrades, do you remember Minin? He called on the people to save Russia! But from whom? From the Poles. Now we have to save Russia from the officials... I will go first, in the first ranks, and if we fall, the second ranks will fall behind us. But he cannot give the order to shoot at us..." On the eve of January 9, it was already being said in all the departments that the tsar might not accept the workers and might send soldiers against them. This, however, did not stop the workers, but gave the whole movement the character of a kind of religious ecstasy. In all sections of the "Sobranie" the collection of signatures to the petition continued until January 9. The workers believed so much in the power of their signatures that they gave them a magical significance. The sick, the elderly, and the handicapped were brought to the table where the signatures were collected to perform this "sacred act". The total number of signatures collected is unknown. The total number of signatures collected is unknown, but it was in the tens of thousands. In one department alone, the journalist N. Simbirsky counted about 40,000 signatures. The leaflets with the workers' signatures were kept by the historian N. P. Pavlov-Silvansky, and after his death in 1908 they were confiscated by the police. Their fate is unknown.

== The petition and the tsar's government ==
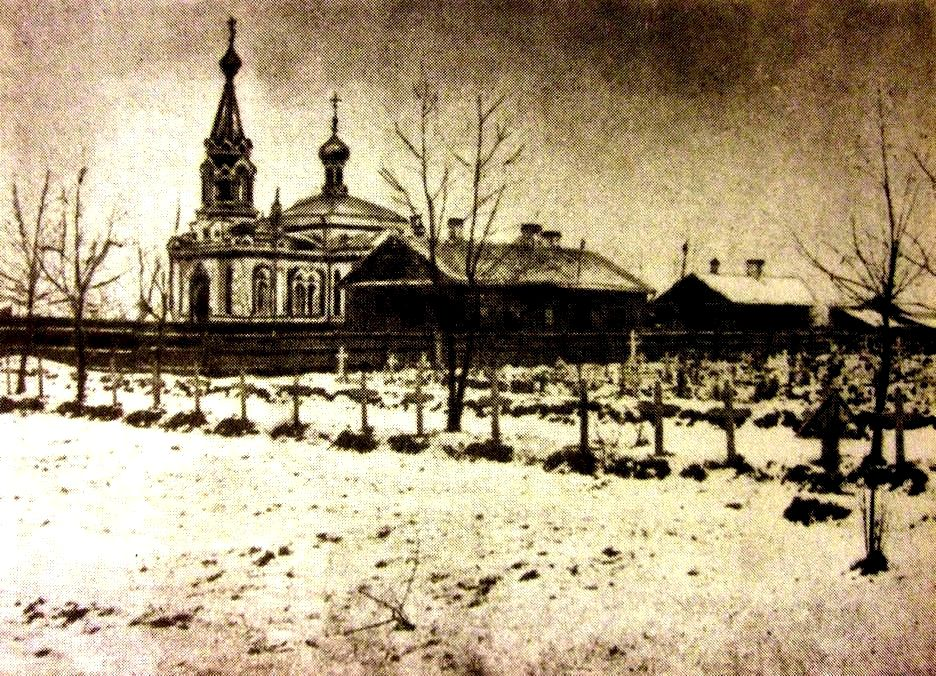
Graves of the victims of Bloody Sunday at Preobrazhensky Cemetery near St. Petersburg

The royal government became aware of the content of Gapon's petition no later than on January 7. On that day Gapon appeared at the reception of the Minister of Justice N. V. Muraviev and handed him one of the lists of the petition. The minister surprised Gapon by informing him that he already had such a text. According to Gapon's recollections, the minister turned to him with the question, "Tell me frankly what all this means?" Having taken the minister's word of honor that he would not arrest him, Gapon addressed him with an impassioned speech. He described the plight of the working class and spoke of the inevitability of political reform in Russia. He persuaded the minister to fall at the tsar's feet and beg him to accept the petition, promising that his name would be written in the annals of history. Muraviev, however, did not support Gapon, replying that he had his own duty to which he would remain faithful. Then Gapon asked to be connected by telephone with the Minister of the Interior, P. D. Svyatopolk-Mirsky. However, the latter refused to speak to the priest at all. Later Svyatopolk-Mirsky explained his refusal to speak with Gapon by the fact that he did not know him personally.

The next day, January 8, a government meeting was held with the highest officials of the state. By this time, all members of the government had become familiar with the text of the "Gapon" petition. Several copies were delivered to the office of the Ministry of the Interior. At the meeting, Justice Minister Muraviev reported on his meeting with Gapon. The minister described Gapon as an ardent revolutionary and a convinced socialist to the point of fanaticism. Muraviev proposed to arrest Gapon and thereby decapitate the nascent movement. Muraviev was supported by Finance Minister V. N. Kokovtsov. Minister of Internal Affairs Svyatopolk-Mirsky and city governor I. A. Fullon weakly objected. At the meeting it was decided to arrest Gapon and to set up barricades of troops to prevent the workers from reaching the tsar's palace. Svyatopolk-Mirsky then went to Tsar Nicholas II in Pushkinsky District and acquainted him with the contents of the petition. In Muraviev's words, the minister called Gapon a "socialist" and reported on the measures taken. Nicholas wrote about it in his diary. According to the tsar's notes, the minister's reports were of a reassuring nature.

According to numerous eyewitness accounts, no one in the government anticipated that the workers would have to be shot. Everyone was sure that the crowd could be dispersed by police action. The question of accepting the petition was not even raised. The content of the petition, which demanded the limitation of the autocracy, made it unacceptable for the authorities. The government report described the political demands of the petition as "bold". The very appearance of the petition was unexpected and took the government by surprise. Deputy Finance Minister V. I. Timiryazev, who attended the January 8 meeting, recalled: "No one expected such a phenomenon, and where is it seen to gather a crowd of one and a half hundred thousand people in the palace in twenty-four hours and to give them the Constituent Assembly in twenty-four hours - after all, this is unprecedented, to give everything at once. We were all confused and did not know what to do". The authorities did not take into account the magnitude of the events or the consequences of a possible shooting on an unarmed population. Because of the government's confusion, the initiative passed into the hands of the military authorities. On the morning of January 9, 1905, crowds of workers led by Gapon moved from different parts of the city toward the Winter Palace. On the approaches to the center they were met by military units and dispersed by cavalry and rifle fire. This day went down in history as "Bloody Sunday" and marked the beginning of the First Russian Revolution. A year later, in January 1906, in a letter to the Minister of Internal Affairs, George Gapon wrote: "Unfortunately, January 9 was not to serve as the starting point for the renewal of Russia in a peaceful way, under the leadership of the sovereign with increased charm, but as the starting point — the beginning of the revolution".

== Contemporaries' appreciations ==
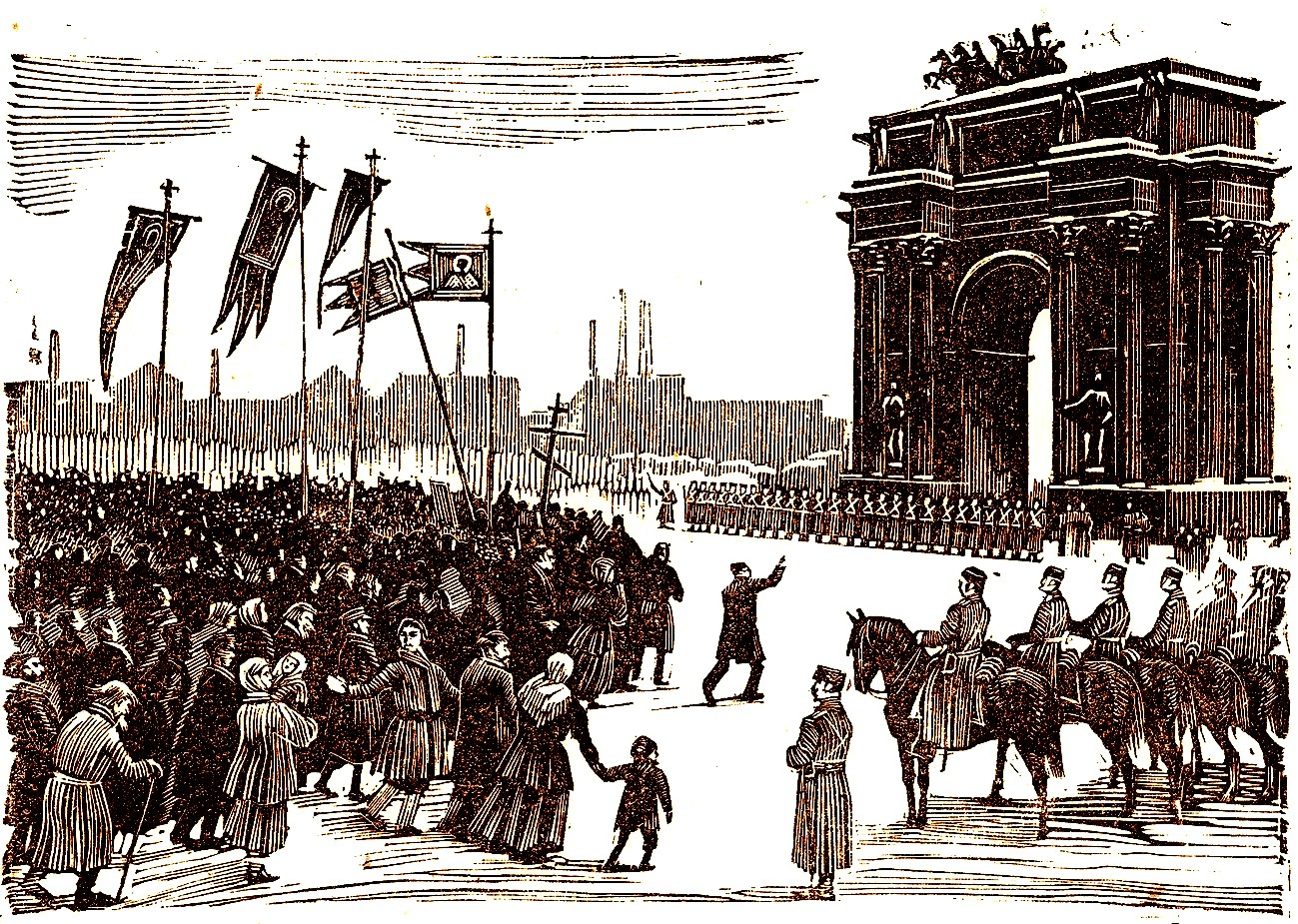
The morning of January 9 at the Narva Gate. Engraving

The petition of January 9, 1905 was not published in any legal Russian press. The petition was written in the midst of a general strike in which all the enterprises of St. Petersburg participated. On January 7, all the printing houses went on strike and the production of newspapers in the capital ceased. On January 7 and 8, Gapon negotiated with the publishers, promising to put the printers to work if the publishers would print the petition. It was expected that it would appear in all the newspapers and circulate in St. Petersburg in many thousands of copies. However, this plan was not carried out due to lack of time. After January 9, when the newspapers began to appear, the government forbade the publication of any material about the events, except for official reports.

As a result, the contents of the petition remained unknown to the majority of the Russian population. According to the recollections of one official, the order not to print the petition came from the Minister of the Interior. The official regretted that the failure to publish the petition gave rise to rumors that the workers had gone to the tsar to complain about their low wages rather than with political demands. At the same time, the text of the petition was published in its first edition in a number of illegal publications — in the journal "Osvobozhdeniye", in the newspapers "Iskra", "Vperyod" and "Revolutionary Russia", as well as in the foreign press. Representatives of the revolutionary and liberal intelligentsia discussed the petition and gave it different evaluations.

In their comments, the liberals pointed to the identity of the petition's demands with the demands of the zemstvo resolutions of late 1904. According to the liberals, the petition marked the union of the workers with the voice of the public, demanding popular representation and political freedoms. Representatives of the revolutionary parties, on the other hand, saw in the petition the influence of revolutionary propaganda.Social-Democratic newspapers claimed that the petition's political demands were identical to the Social-Democrats' minimum program and were written under their influence. Lenin called the petition "an extremely interesting refraction in the minds of the masses, or their irresponsible leaders of the Social Democratic program". It has been suggested that the petition was the result of an agreement between Gapon and the Social Democrats, who insisted on the inclusion of political demands in exchange for their loyalty to the Gapon movement. Unlike the Liberals, the Social Democrats emphasized the revolutionary nature of the petition's demands. L. D. Trotsky wrote that in the solemn notes of the petition "the threat of the proletarians drowned out the demand of the subjects. According to Trotsky, "the petition not only contrasted the vague phraseology of liberal resolutions with the well-honed slogans of political democracy, but also infused them with class content with its demands for freedom to strike and an eight-hour day.

At the same time, revolutionaries emphasized the dual nature of the petition, the contradiction between its form and content. A January 8 leaflet of the St. Petersburg Committee of the RSDLP stated that the petition's demands presupposed the overthrow of the autocracy, and therefore it was pointless to address them to the tsar. The tsar and his officials cannot give up their privileges. Freedom is not given in vain; it is won with arms in the hand. The anarchist V. M. Volin noted that the petition in its final form represented the greatest historical paradox. "With all loyalty to the tsar, it asked him to do no more and no less than to allow —and even to commit— a revolution that would ultimately deprive him of power... In effect, it was an invitation to suicide". Similar judgments were expressed by liberals.

All the commentators noted the great inner strength of the petition, its impact on the broad people masses. The French journalist E. Avenard wrote: "The resolutions of the liberal banquets, even the resolutions of the zemstvos, seem so pale next to the petition that the workers will try to present to the Tsar tomorrow. It is full of awe-inspiring and tragic significance". Avenar wrote. St. Petersburg Menshevik I. N. Kubikov recalled: "This petition was written with talent in the sense of adapting its style to the level and mood of the St. Petersburg working masses of the time, and its irresistible effect on the grayest listener was reflected with full clarity on the faces of the workers and their wives". The Bolshevik D. F. Sverchkov called the petition "the best art-historical document, reflecting as in a mirror all the moods that gripped the workers at that time. "Strange but strong tones were heard in this historical document," recalled N. S. Rusanov. And according to V. F. Goncharov, the petition was "a document that had an enormous, revolutionary effect on the working masses". Many emphasized the practical importance of the petition. "Its historical significance, however, lies not in the text, but in the fact," noted L. Trotsky. — The petition was only a prelude to the action that united the working masses through the spirit of an ideal monarchy — united to immediately confront the proletariat and the real monarchy as two mortal enemies".

== Historical significance of the petition ==
The events of January 9, 1905 marked the beginning of the First Russian Revolution. And nine months later, on October 17, 1905, Tsar Nicholas II signed the Manifesto granting political freedoms to the people of Russia. The October Manifesto was in line with many of the basic demands of the January 9 Petition. The Manifesto granted the people inviolability of the person, freedom of conscience, freedom of speech, freedom of assembly, and freedom of association. The Manifesto established the representation of the people in the form of the State Duma and granted suffrage to all classes. It recognized the right of the people's deputies to approve laws and supervise the legality of the authorities. Contemporaries noted the connection between the events of January 9 and the Manifesto of October 17. The journalist N. Simbirsky wrote on the anniversary of "Bloody Sunday": "The workers on that day went to extract freedom for the Russian people with their breasts... And they extracted it by paving the streets of St. Petersburg with the corpses of their best fighters..." The columnist of the newspaper "Slovo" noted: "Not death carried these masses, not destruction prepared these heroes — they carried a petition for freedom, the very freedom that is now only gradually being realized". And the main author of the petition, Georgy Gapon, in an open letter to the citizens, reminded them that the workers, the heroes of January 9, "with their blood have paved a wide road to freedom for you, the Russian citizens".

Contemporaries noted the historical uniqueness of the petition of January 9, 1905. On the one hand, it was in the spirit of a loyal request to the monarch. On the other hand, it contained revolutionary demands, the fulfillment of which meant a complete transformation of the social and political order of the state. The petition became a historical milestone between the two epochs[65]. It was the last petition in Russian history and at the same time the first revolutionary program brought to the square by hundreds of thousands of people. The Bolshevik D. F. Sverchkov, comparing the petition with the program of the Social-Democratic Party, wrote:

"So, for the first time in the history of the world, the program of the revolutionary workers' party was written not in a proclamation directed against the tsar, but in a humble petition full of love and respect for this very tsar. For the first time this program was carried into the streets by hundreds of thousands of workers not under the red banners of the revolution, but under church banners, icons and portraits of the tsar; for the first time during the procession of the workers who signed this petition, not the Internationale or the Workers' Marseillaise was sung, but the prayer "Save, O Lord, thy people..."; for the first time the prayer "Save, O Lord, thy people..." was chanted. "For the first time, at the head of this demonstration, unprecedented in its number of participants, revolutionary in its essence and peaceful in its form, was a priest in vestments, carrying a cross... Such a procession had never been seen before in any country or at any time".

The publicist I. Vardin noted the radicalism of the petition's social demands, which anticipated the slogans of the October Revolution of 1917. The program outlined in the petition was not the usual bourgeois program, but the program of an unprecedented social revolution of the workers and peasants. This program was directed not only against autocratic and official, political oppression, but at the same time and with equal force against economic oppression, against the omnipotence of the landlords and capitalists. "On January 9, 1905, the most advanced, the most complete revolution of all that had occurred before began in Russia. That is why it shook the whole world".

One of the leaders of the "Union of Liberation" Y. D. Kuskova called the petition a Russian people's charter. She called the petition a Russian people's charter. "The charter enumerated in detail the rights of the people, which should be secured to them as inalienable rights... The Russian People's Charter, which was born under the bullets of a passionate army, has since been implemented in every way... The martyrs of January 9 sleep peacefully in their graves. Their memory will long live in the consciousness of the people, and long after that they, the dead, will show the way to the living: to the People's Charter which they carried and for which they died..."

== Petition's text ==
- Петиция рабочих Санкт-Петербурга для подачи царю Николаю II // Красная летопись. — Л., 1925. — № 2. — pp. 30–31
- The St. Petersburg workmen's petition to the Tsar, January 22, 1905 // Красная летопись. — Л., 1925. — № 2. — pp. 33–35.

== Bibliography ==
Memoirs and Recollections

- Гапон, Г. А. (1990). История моей жизни = The Story of My Life (in Russian). М.: Книга. p. 64.
- Карелин, А. Е. (1922). Девятое января и Гапон. Воспоминания // Красная летопись (in Russian). pp. 106–116.
- Варнашёв, Н. М. (1924). От начала до конца с гапоновской организацией // Историко-революционный сборник (in Russian). Vol. 1. pp. 177–208.
- Павлов, И. И. (1908). Из воспоминаний о "Рабочем Союзе" и священнике Гапоне // Минувшие годы (in Russian). pp. 21–57 (3), 79–107 (4).
- Карелин, А. Е. (1925). Из воспоминаний участника гапоновской организации // 9 января (in Russian). pp. 26–32.

Articles and researches

- Шилов, А. А. (1925). К документальной истории петиции 9 января 1905 г. // Красная летопись (in Russian). pp. 19–36.
- Гуревич, Л. Я. (1906). Народное движение в Петербурге 9-го января 1905 г. // Былое (in Russian). pp. 195–223.
- Святловский, В. В. (1907). Профессиональное движение в России (in Russian). СПб.: Изд-е М. В. Пирожкова. p. 406.
- Гуревич, Л. Я. (1926). Девятое января (in Russian) («Пролетарий» ed.). p. 90.
- Ганелин, Р. Ш. (1983). К истории текста петиции 9 января 1905 г // Вспомогательные исторические дисциплины (in Russian). Vol. 14. pp. 229–249.
