= Vladimir Vladiminsky =

- Born: April 20, 1888; Varyslavikstol, Yakutsk
- Years active: 1904 – Unknown
- Known for: events occurred in German POW camp

Vladimir Vladiminsky (April 20, 1888 – Unknown) was a Russian peasant who was born in 1888, in the village of Varyslavikstol near Yakutsk. Having been born into a family which had just been emancipated from serfdom decades earlier, he had developed a strong sense of nationalism and a deep love for the royal family, with a recorded mental breakdown at the age of 8 after learning about the death of Alexander III (took two years for the information to get across). Vladiminsky is a character who had very often been ignored by historians, despite his rather pivotal contributions in shaping modern Russian history, and remains so until this day, with very little records found about him.

== Early life ==
At the age of 16, Vladiminsky travelled to Petrograd to join the navy and found himself at odds with the growing socialism amongst his peers. Unable to stand all the traitorous ideology that plagued his unit, Vladiminsky escaped the navy shortly afterwards. Disappointed, he returned to Varyslavikstol on the newly built Trans-Siberian Railway; however, shortly after arriving, he encountered a military backup runner who was on the way to Moscow to report of the attack in Port Arthur (which later developed into the Russo Japanese War). He immediately set off for Petrograd to rejoin the navy, regardless of the previously witnessed unpatriotic activities. However, arriving a year later (the Trans-Siberian Railways were occupied by military transports, forcing him to go by mule), he learned the loss of the war, and kneeled before the rather empty harbour for three days and three nights before the five remaining disarmed ships. Heartbroken, he decided to go to the Winter Palace to admire the Tsar before returning the Varyslavikstol. Upon arriving on 22 January 1905, he saw a crowd of men waving religious symbols and the royal family's portraits. As the leader of the crowd claimed to be able to provide a chance to meet with the Tsar, Vladiminsky joined joyfully, finally meeting other fellow patriots in a city filled with socialists.

== Coma and memory loss ==
The crowd Vladiminsky joined later became known for the event that occurred on that day – the Bloody Sunday. Vladimir was one of the first casualties, shot twice in the abdomen by an imperial guard, and later trampled by approximately 300 of those who were in front of him. Vladimir stayed in a coma for about 12 years, suffering a head trauma and a memory loss of any knowledge of the events that happened on that day. As the hospital staff explained to him after awakening, he refused to believe the fact that the Tsar's guards had shot him, and escaped the Soviet-run hospital soon after. Within 50 meters from the hospital window he escaped from, he discovered a newspaper that contained the information of the abdication of the Tsar, and the war with Germany; immediately, he left for war in the Eastern front.

== Imprisonment and becoming a monk ==
After fighting as an independent fighter in isolation from the Russian army for more than two years (as he was extremely disappointed at the state of the Russian military, infested with socialism), he decided to revisit the Russian front. As the Treaty of Brest-Litovsk had already taken place, all that he could find were German soldiers; exposed to enemies, he was quickly captured as a prisoner of war. Whilst in captivity, the execution of the Russian royal family took place, and as the information had reached Vladiminsky, it became a pivotal moment of his life. As recalled by German soldier Heinrich Fritzburg: "The prisoner Vladiminsky raged directly after knowing the execution of the Tsar, gaining a monstrous strength, killing my friends Otto von Fritzland and Friedrich Ottoburg in one punch before tearing through the prison gates running off to the North, presumably Russia". The science behind this event remains unexplained until this day.

Several sightings of Vladiminsky were reported across the century to come, with three confirmed being: 1947 Aug 30, 1967 Jan 21, 1999 Aug 15, all in various areas of Siberia. Evidences from the sightings show that he had become a monk. To this day, its popularly believed that he remains as a hermit monk residing in the Siberian wilderness. If so confirmed, he would be the longest-living male/person in the world.
