= Karelina =

Karelina (Карелина; feminine), or Karelin (Russian: Карелин), is a Russian last name and may refer to:

- Galina Karelina (born 1950), Soviet pair skater
- Ksenia Karelina, ballerina
- Tatiana Karelina (born 1980), Russian entrepreneur
- Vera Karelina (1870–1931), Russian labour activist and revolutionary

== See also ==
- Karelin
