= Karelin =

Karelin (Russian: Карелин), or Karelina (Карелина; feminine), is a Russian last name and may refer to:

- Alexander Karelin (b. 1967), Soviet/Russian wrestler and Hero of the Russian Federation
- Anatoly Karelin (1922–1974), Soviet aircraft pilot and Hero of the Soviet Union
- Andrei Karelin (1837–1906), Russian photographer
- Apollon Karelin (1863–1926), Russian anarchist
- Grigory Karelin (1801–1872), Russian explorer
- Ivan Karelin (1924–2001), Soviet test pilot and Hero of the Soviet Union
- Konstantin Karelin (1907–1994), Soviet army officer and Hero of the Soviet Union
- Lazar Karelin (1920–20??), Soviet writer
- Pavel Karelin (1990–2011), Russian ski jumper
- Polina Karelina (born 2001), Bahamian-Ukrainian chess player
- Pyotr Karelin (1922–1944), Soviet army officer and Hero of the Soviet Union
- Vasily Karelin (1862 or 1869 – 1926), Russian opera singer
- Vladimir Karelin (1891–1938), Russian/Soviet politician and one of the leaders of the Left Socialist-Revolutionaries

== See also ==
- Karelina
