= If the Führer knew =

German idiom

If the Führer knew (German: Wenn das der Führer wüsste) is an idiom originating in Nazi Germany, describing a political phenomenon wherein many Germans at the time believed that Nazi Party officials were deliberately concealing evidence of atrocities from Adolf Hitler, who was oblivious and would have put an end to them. It also had a more general, often jocular, sense, used whenever there was a chaotic or inefficient situation.

This phenomenon was observed for the first time in the early years of Hitler's chancellorship, particularly following the Night of the Long Knives. It was believed that Hitler had ordered the purge after discovering evidence of crimes perpetrated without his knowledge by Ernst Röhm and the SA.

Sometimes, this way of thinking manifested in a belief in an "infallible" Führer. The perception of Adolf Hitler as an "enlightened leader", who sought only what was best for the German people, was counterposed with radical and incompetent lower-level bureaucrats. These bureaucrats were supposedly responsible for all the misdeeds of the Nazi government.

== See also ==
- "Good tsar, bad boyars" - idiom with a similar meaning originating in the Russian Empire.
