= Union of Liberation =

Political group in Russian Empire

Union of Liberation Союз Освобождения
- Founded: August 2, 1903
- Dissolved: 1905
- Succeeded by: Constitutional Democratic Party
- Newspaper: Osvobozhdeniye
- Ideology: Liberalism; Constitutionalism
- Political position: Center-left to Left-wing

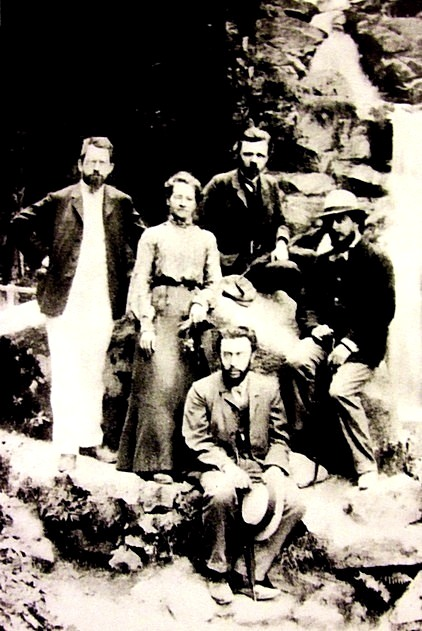
The group of founders of the "Union of Liberation" in 1902 in Germany (from left to right): Pyotr Struve, Nina Struve, Vasily Bogucharsky, Nikolai Berdyaev and Semyon Frank (below).

The Union of Liberation (Russian: Союз Освобождения, Soyuz Osvobozhdeniya) was a liberal political group founded in Saint Petersburg, Russia in January 1904 under the influence of Peter Berngardovich Struve, a former Marxist. Its goal was originally the replacement of the absolutism of the Tsar with a constitutional monarchy. Its other goals included an equal, secret and direct vote for all Russian citizens and the self-determination of different nationalities (such as the Poles) that lived in the Russian Empire.

After the Russian Revolution of 1905 and the establishment of the Constitutional Democratic Party, most of the members of the Union of Liberation joined the Kadets and the group dissolved the same year.

The origins of the Union of Liberation can be traced back to 1902 when Russian liberal exiles created a periodical called Osvobozhdeniye (Liberation) which included ideas such as a constitutional monarchy.
