= Vera Karelina =

Vera Markovna Karelina
- Вера Марковна Карелина
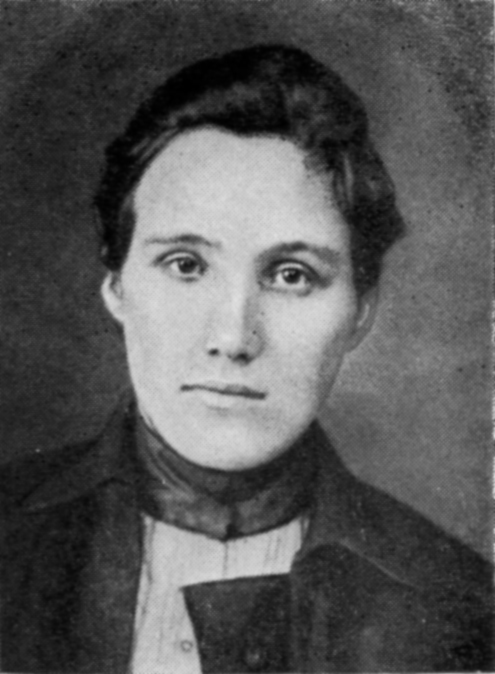
- Vera Markovna Karelina, c. 1895
- Born: Vera Markova (Вера Маркова); 1870; St. Petersburg, Russian Empire
- Died: 1931 (aged 60–61); Leningrad, Soviet Union
- Occupation: Russian labour activist
- Spouse: Aleksei Egorovich Karelin

Vera Markovna Karelina (née Markova; Russian: Вера Марковна Карелина; 1870–1931) was a Russian labour activist and revolutionary, one of the leaders of the Georgy Gapon's Assembly of Russian Factory and Mill Workers of St. Petersburg and the Bloody Sunday procession.

== Early years ==
Vera Markovna Markova was born in 1870 and given to the St. Petersburg Foundling Hospital at an early age. For a time, she lived with poor peasants in near Yamburg, and attended the village school, however at the age of fourteen she returned to the orphanage and was assigned to technical work. In 1890, she left the orphanage to work as a weaver in a cotton mill.

== Beginnings of the labour movement ==
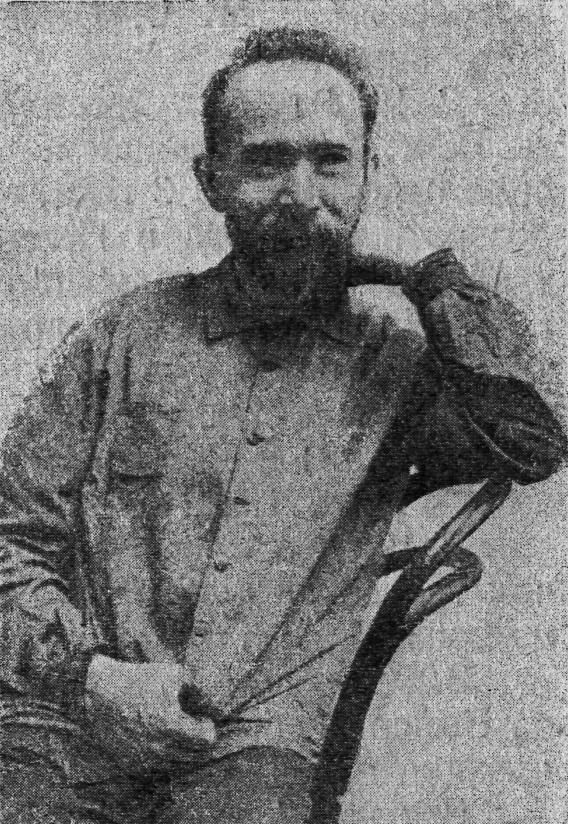
Aleksey Yegorovich Karelin

Karelina became involved in the Russian labour movement at the age of 20, when she joined a workers' circle led by Fyodor Afanasev. The circle was part of the Brusnev group, one of the first socialist organisations in Russia. The circle organised lessons from intellectuals such as Leonid Krasin and Stepan Radchenko, read illegal literature, discussed economic issues, and studied Marxism. In 1891, Karelina set up her own circle of women weavers as part of the Brusnev group.

In 1892, Karelina was arrested for participating in International Workers' Day celebrations and attending an illegal political meeting at the Volkovo Cemetery. She was sentenced to six months imprisonment at the Shpalerka prison. After being released, she moved to Kharkiv, but was imprisoned again on the same charges. She was finally released in 1894.

In 1896, Karelina returned to St. Petersburg and resumed her illegal involvement in the workers movement. She participated in a weavers' strike and, as a representative of the workers' circles, became involved with Vladimir Lenin's League of Struggle for the Emancipation of the Working Class. She met Lenin on several occasions.

In 1897, Karelina and her husband Aleksei Karelin moved to Vasilyevsky Island and set up a circle of print workers. The circle collaborated with the Russian Social Democratic Labour Party (RSDRP) to disseminate illegal literature and thereby became an influential part of the socialist movement in St. Petersburg.

== Gapon's Assembly ==
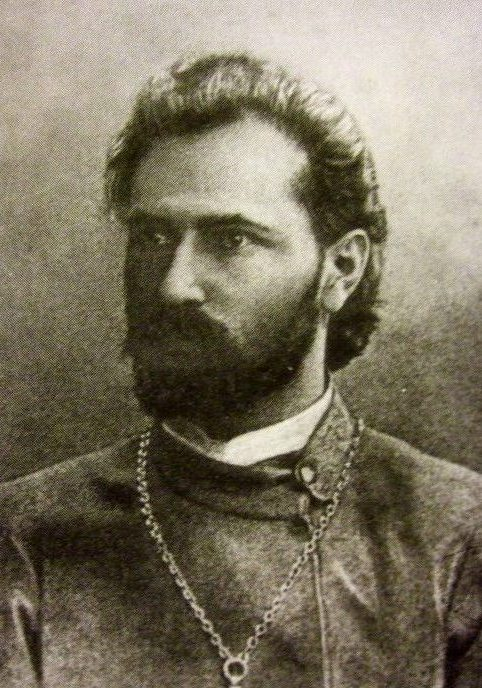
Georgy Apollonovich Gapon

In the early 1900s the Russian authorities, under the initiative of police administrator Sergei Zubatov, sought to combat revolutionary socialism by establishing legal, pro-government trade unions. In St. Petersburg, they supported the creation of the Assembly of Russian Factory Workers of St. Petersburg, headed by Orthodox priest Georgy Gapon. Initially, the Karelin circle saw Gapon's Assembly in a negative light, as "police socialism". However, after meeting Gapon in 1903, the Karelins came to the conclusion that he was "an honest man" and decided to cooperate with him. They saw an opportunity to use the legal Assembly to promote socialist ideas.

Karelina became one of the leading figures in Gapon's organisation. On Gapon's recommendation, she was chosen as the chairwoman of the Assembly's women's section, and conducted classes and educational activities for female workers – in keeping with the organisation's stated aim to raise awareness, organise and unite the working masses. She also became one of the Assembly's decision-makers, sitting on Gapon's "secret committee" of his most trusted workers. The secret committee discussed political issues and planned for open action by the workers.

According to the memoirs of I. I. Pavlov, Karelina was second only to Gapon in her influence on the Assembly. She was the only person who dared to engage Gapon in open debate and force him to change his mind. As a result, Karelin was the de facto leader of the "opposition" to Gapon, and under her influence the Assembly, and Gapon himself, became increasingly politicized and aligned with her point of view. For his part, Gapon treated Karelina with great respect. In private, he described her as "a woman of extraordinary spiritual power, able to stand at the head of the female proletariat" ("как о женщине необыкновенной духовной силы, способной стать во главе женского пролетариата").

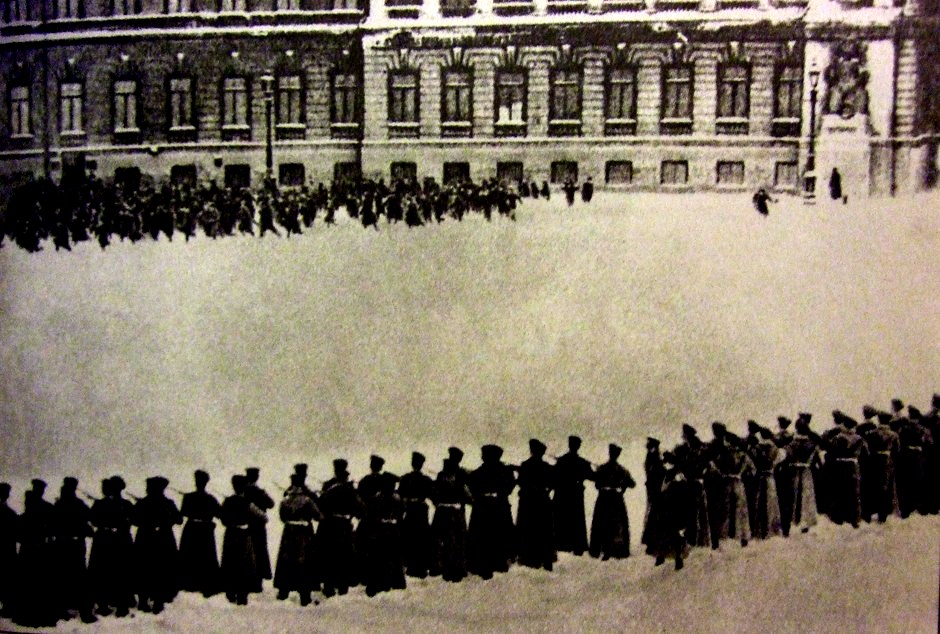
The workers' procession meets the Imperial Guard on Bloody Sunday. Photograph by Karl Bulla, 1905.

Karelina was involved in planning a workers' procession on 9 January 1905 – Bloody Sunday. Her "opposition" supported adding immediate political demands to their petition, but Gapon considered this premature. The day before the march, Kerelina gave speeches to the sections of the Assembly, urging women to come to the march and share the fate of their husbands. Reportedly, she did not anticipate a peaceful outcome. In one of her speeches, she said to the women:

Милые, не надо бояться смерти! Что смерть! Разве наша жизнь не страшнее смерти? Девушки, милые, не бойтесь смерти... Darlings, do not be afraid of death! What is death? Are our lives not worse than death? Girls, darlings, do not be afraid of death...

On the morning of Bloody Sunday, Karelina and her husband led a section of the march from Vasilyevsky Island to the Winter Palace. It was fired upon and dispersed by the Imperial Guard, resulting in some 1,000 casualties and the outbreak of the 1905 Russian Revolution.

== After Bloody Sunday ==
Gapon fled Russia shortly after Bloody Sunday and the Assembly was disbanded. Karelina continued to work underground and in October 1905 she was elected to the Saint Petersburg Soviet.

She also kept in contact with Gapon, collaborating with him on his planned "Russian Workers' Union". She was one of the few people who remained dedicated to Gapon's cause after his death, and after his assassination in 1906 she spoke at his funeral, calling for revenge on his assassins.

In subsequent years, Karelina participated in the cooperative movement, helping to create a "Labour Union" in 1907 (quickly shut down by the authorities) and later rural cooperatives in the district of Yamburg. She also wrote a series of essays on the early history of the labour movement.

== See also ==
- Anna Boldyreva
