= Bloody Sunday (1905) =

1905 protest in St. Petersburg, Russia

- Part of the 1905 Russian Revolution
- Crowd of petitioners, led by Father Gapon, near Narva Gate, St. Petersburg
- Date: 22 January [O.S. 9 January] 1905
- Location: St. Petersburg, Russian Empire
- Goals: To deliver a petition to Tsar Nicholas II, calling for reforms such as: limitations on state officials' power, improvements to working conditions and hours, and the introduction of a national parliament
- Methods: Demonstration march
- Result: Dispersal of the workers' procession; beginning of the 1905 Russian Revolution

Parties
| Assembly of Russian Factory Workers of St. Petersburg | Imperial Guard, Cossacks, line infantry |

Lead figures
| Father Georgy Gapon | Tsar Nicholas II |

Number
| 7,000 to 50,000 demonstrators | 10,000+ soldiers |

Casualties and losses
| Deaths 143–234; Injuries 439–800; Arrests 6,831 | 2 policemen died |

Bloody Sunday (Russian: Крова́вое воскресе́нье, romanized: Krovavoye voskresenye, IPA: [krɐˈvavəɪ vəskrʲɪˈsʲenʲjɪ]), also known as Red Sunday (Russian: Красное воскресенье), was the series of events on Sunday, 22 January [O.S. 9 January] 1905 in St Petersburg, Russia, when demonstrators, led by Father Georgy Gapon, were fired upon by soldiers of the Imperial Guard as they marched towards the Winter Palace to present a petition to Tsar Nicholas II.

Bloody Sunday caused grave consequences for the tsarist authorities governing Russia: the events in St. Petersburg provoked public outrage and a series of massive strikes that spread quickly to the industrial centres of the Russian Empire. The massacre on Bloody Sunday is considered to be the start of the active phase of the Revolution of 1905. In addition to beginning the 1905 Revolution, historians such as Lionel Kochan in his book Russia in Revolution 1890–1918 view the events of Bloody Sunday to be one of the key events which led to the Russian Revolution of 1917.

== Background ==
After the emancipation of the serfs in 1861 by Tsar Alexander II of Russia, there emerged a new peasant working class in Russia's industrializing cities. Prior to emancipation, no working class could be established because serfs working in the cities to supplement their incomes retained their ties to the land and their masters. Although the working conditions in the cities were horrific, they were only employed for short periods of time and returned to their village when their work was complete, or when it was time to resume agricultural work.

The emancipation of the serfs resulted in the establishment of a permanent working class in urban areas, which created a strain on traditional Russian society. Peasants "were confronted by unfamiliar social relationships, a frustrating regime of factory discipline, and the distressing conditions of urban life." This new group of peasant workers made up the majority of workers in urban areas. Generally unskilled, these peasants received low wages, were employed in unsafe working environments, and worked up to fifteen hours a day. Although some workers still had a paternalistic relationship with their employer, factory employers were more present and active than the noble landowners that previously had ownership of the serfs. Under serfdom, peasants had little, if any, contact with their landowner. In the new urban setting, however, factory employers often used their absolute authority in abusive and arbitrary manners. Their abuse of power, made evident by the long working hours, low wages, and lack of safety precautions, led to strikes in Russia.

=== Early strikes ===
"The Russian term for strike, stachka, was derived from an old colloquial term, stakat’sia- to conspire for a criminal act." As such, Russian laws viewed strikes as criminal acts of conspiracy and potential catalysts for rebellion. The governmental response to strikes, however, supported the efforts of the workers and promoted strikes as an effective tool that could be used by the workers to help improve their working conditions. The Tsarist authorities usually intervened with harsh punishment, especially for the leaders and spokesmen of the strike, but often the complaints of the strikers were reviewed and seen as justified and the employers were required to correct the abuses about which the strikers protested.

These corrections did not address a grossly unbalanced system that clearly favoured employers. This caused the continuation of strikes and the first major industrial strike in Russia in 1870 in St. Petersburg. This new phenomenon was a catalyst of many more strikes in Russia, which increased until they reached a peak between 1884 and 1885 when 4,000 workers went on strike at Morozov's cotton mill. This large strike prompted officials to consider regulations that would restrain the abuses of employers and ensure safety in the workplace. A new law was passed in 1886 that required employers to specify working conditions in their factories in writing, included the treatment of workers, workers' hours and the safety precautions taken by the employer. The new law also created factory inspectors who were charged with preserving industrial peace. Despite these changes, strike activity again reached high proportions during the 1890s, resulting in the restriction of the workday to eleven and a half hours in 1897.

=== Priest Gapon ===
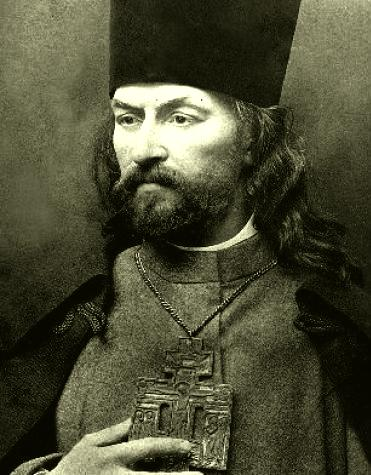
Georgy Gapon, a Russian Orthodox priest, led the workers' procession to present a petition to the tsar on 22 January [O.S. 9 January] 1905, known as Bloody Sunday

A leading role in these events was played by a Priest Georgy Gapon. Fr. Gapon was a charismatic speaker and effective organizer who took an interest in the working and lower classes of the Russian cities.

The "Assembly of the Russian Factory and Mill Workers of the City of St. Petersburg", otherwise known as "the Assembly", had been headed by Fr. Gapon since 1903. The Assembly was patronized by the Department of the Police and the St. Petersburg Okhrana (secret police); during 1904 the membership of the association had grown rapidly, although more radical groups saw it as being a "police union" – under government influence. The Assembly's objectives were to defend workers' rights and to elevate their moral and religious status. In the words of Fr. Gapon, this organization served as:

…a noble endeavor, under the guidance of truly Russian educated laymen and clergy, to foster among the workers a sober, Christian view of life and to instill the principle of mutual aid, thereby helping to improve the lives and working conditions of laborers without violent disruption of law and order in their relations with employers and the government.

— G.A. Gapon, quoted in Sablinsky, The Road to Bloody Sunday, 89

== Prelude ==
=== Putilov incident ===
In December 1904, six workers at the Putilov Ironworks in St. Petersburg were fired because of their membership in the Assembly, although the plant manager asserted that they were fired for unrelated reasons. Virtually the entire workforce of the Putilov Ironworks went on strike when the plant manager refused to accede to their requests that the workers be rehired. Sympathy strikes in other parts of the city raised the number of strikers up to 150,000 workers in 382 factories. By 21 January [O.S. 8 January] 1905, the city had no electricity and no newspapers whatsoever and all public areas were declared closed.

=== Petition and preparation for the march ===
The decision to prepare and present a petition was made in the course of discussions during the evening of 19 January [O.S. 6 January] 1905, at the headquarters of Gapon's movement – the "Gapon Hall" on the Shlisselburg Trakt in Saint Petersburg. The petition, as drafted in respectful terms by Gapon himself, made clear the problems and opinions of the workers and called for improved working conditions, fairer wages, and a reduction in the working day to eight hours and the introduction of universal suffrage. The idea of a petition resonated with the traditionally minded working masses. From the 15th to the early 18th centuries individual or collective petitions were an established means of bringing grievances to the attention of the tsar's administration. They could be submitted to the Petitions Prikaz (office) in Moscow, or directly to the tsar or his courtiers when the tsar was making an appearance outside the palace.

The march on the Winter Palace was not a revolutionary or rebellious act, though it was done against the permission of public authorities. Political groups, such as the Bolsheviks, Mensheviks, and the Social Revolutionaries disapproved of the procession due to its lack of political demands. Fr. Gapon even encouraged his followers to tear up leaflets that supported revolutionary aims. The majority of Russian workers retained their traditional conservative values of Orthodoxy, faith in the autocracy, and indifference to political life. The workers of St. Petersburg wished to receive fair treatment and better working conditions; they decided, therefore, to petition the tsar in hopes he would act on it. In their eyes, the tsar was their representative who would help them if he was made aware of their situation. God appointed the tsar, therefore the tsar had an obligation to protect the people and do what was best for them. Their petition was written in subservient terms and ended with a reminder to the tsar of his obligation to the people of Russia and their resolve to do what it took to ensure their pleas were met. It concluded: "And if Thou dost not so order and dost not respond to our pleas we will die here in this square before Thy palace". Gapon, who had an ambiguous relationship with the tsarist authorities, sent a copy of the petition to the Minister of the Interior together with a notification of his intention to lead a procession of members of his workers' movement to the Winter Palace on the following Sunday.

Troops had been deployed around the Winter Palace and at other key points. Despite the urging of various members of the imperial family to stay in St. Petersburg, the tsar left on Saturday 21 January [O.S. 8 January] 1905 for Tsarskoye Selo. A cabinet meeting, held without any particular sense of urgency that same evening, concluded that the police would publicize his absence and that the workers would accordingly probably abandon their plans for a march.

== Events of Sunday 22 January ==
=== Beginning of the march ===
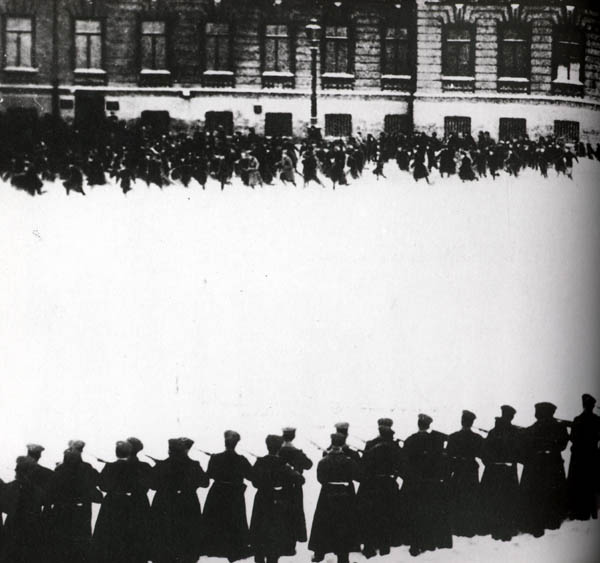
Still from the Soviet movie Devyatoe Yanvarya ("9th of January") (1925) showing a line of armed soldiers facing demonstrators at the approaches to the Winter Palace in St Petersburg

In the pre-dawn winter darkness of the morning of Sunday, 22 January [O.S. 9 January] 1905, striking workers and their families began to gather at six points in the industrial outskirts of St Petersburg. Holding religious icons and singing hymns and patriotic songs (particularly "God Save the Tsar!"), a crowd of "more than 3,000" proceeded without police interference towards the Winter Palace, the tsar's official residence. The crowd, whose mood was quiet, did not know that the tsar was not in residence. Insofar as there was firm planning, the intention was for the various columns of marchers to converge in front of the palace at about 2 pm. Estimates of the total numbers involved range wildly from police figures of 3,000 to organizers' claims of 50,000. Initially, it was intended that women, children and elderly workers should lead, to emphasize the united nature of the demonstration. Vera Karelina, who was one of Gapon's inner circle, had encouraged women to take part although she expected that there would be casualties. On reflection, younger men moved to the front to make up the leading ranks.

=== Government measures ===
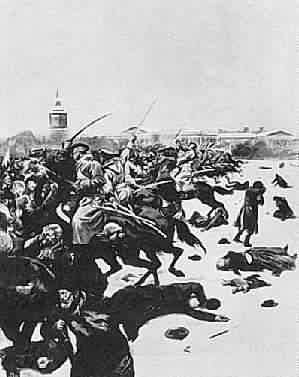
Soviet painting of the Bloody Sunday massacre in St Petersburg

A report had been made to the tsar at Tsarskoe Selo on Saturday night on the measures being taken to contain the marchers. Substantial military forces were deployed in and around the environs of the Winter Palace. These comprised units of the Imperial Guard, who provided the permanent garrison of Saint Petersburg and Cossacks, plus infantry regiments brought in by rail in the early morning of 9 January from Reval and Pskov. The troops, who now numbered about 10,000, had been ordered to halt the columns of marchers before they reached the palace square but the reaction of government forces was inconsistent and confused. Individual policemen did salute the religious banners and portraits of the tsar carried by the crowd or joined the procession. Army officers variously told the marchers that they could proceed in smaller groups, called on them to disperse or ordered their troops to fire into the marchers without warning. When the crowds continued to press forward, Cossacks and regular cavalry made charges using their sabres or trampling the people.

=== Shootings ===
The first instance of shooting occurred between 10 and 11 am. There was no single encounter directly before the Winter Palace, as often portrayed, but rather a series of separate collisions at the bridges or other entry points to the central city. The column led by Gapon was fired upon near the Narva Gate. Around forty people were killed or wounded there, although Gapon himself was not injured.

As late as 2 pm large family groups were promenading on the Nevsky Prospekt as was customary on Sunday afternoons, mostly unaware of the extent of the violence elsewhere in the city. Amongst them were parties of workers still making their way to the Winter Palace as originally intended by Gapon. A detachment of the Preobrazhensky Guards, previously stationed in the Palace Square where about 2,300 soldiers were being held in reserve, now made its way onto the Nevsky and formed two ranks opposite the Alexander Gardens. Following a single shouted warning a bugle sounded and four volleys were fired into the panicked crowd, many of whom had not been participants in the organized marches.

=== Casualties ===
The total number killed in the day's clashes is uncertain. The tsar's officials recorded 96 dead and 333 injured; anti-government sources claimed more than 4,000 dead; moderate estimates still average around 1,000 killed or wounded, both from shots and being trampled during the panic. Another source noted that the official estimate was 132 people killed. Leon Trotsky did not put forward a precise figure but claimed that hundreds were killed and that many of the dead were secretly buried by the authorities.

Nicholas II described the day as "painful and sad". As reports spread across the city, disorder and looting broke out. Gapon's Assembly was closed down that day, and Gapon quickly left Russia with the assistance of writer and political activist Maxim Gorky.

=== Reactions ===
This event was seen by the British ambassador as inflaming revolutionary activities in Russia and contributing to the Revolution of 1905. Media commentary in Britain and the United States was overwhelmingly negative towards the actions of an already unpopular regime. The writer Leo Tolstoy was emotionally affected by the event, reflecting the revulsion of liberal, socialist and intellectual opinion within Russia itself.

== Consequences ==
The immediate consequence of Bloody Sunday was a strike movement that spread throughout the country. Strikes began to erupt outside of St. Petersburg in places such as Moscow, Warsaw, Riga, Vilna (Vilnius), Kovno (Kaunas), Reval (Tallinn), Tiflis (Tbilisi), Baku and Batum. In all, about 414,000 people participated in the work stoppage during January 1905. Tsar Nicholas II attempted to appease the people with a duma; however, the autocracy eventually resorted to brute force near the end of 1905 in order to curtail the burgeoning strike movement that continued to spread. Between October 1905 and April 1906, an estimated 15,000 peasants and workers were either hanged or shot; 20,000 were injured and 45,000 sent into exile.

Perhaps the most significant effect of Bloody Sunday was the drastic change in the attitude of the Russian peasants and workers. Previously the tsar had been seen as the champion of the people: in dire situations, the masses would appeal to the tsar, traditionally through a petition, and the tsar would respond to his people promising to set things right. The lower classes placed their faith in the tsar. Any problems that the lower classes faced were associated with the boyars of Russia; however, after Bloody Sunday the tsar was no longer distinguished from the bureaucrats and was held personally responsible for the tragedy that occurred.

Although the tsar was not at the Winter Palace and did not give the order for the troops to fire, he was widely blamed for the inefficiency and callousness with which the crisis had been handled. While it was unrealistic for the marchers to expect Nicholas to ride out into the Palace Square to meet them, his absence from the city, against at least some advice, reflects a lack of imagination and perception that he was to show on other occasions. The killing of people, many of whom had seen the tsar as their "Little Father", resulted in a surge of bitterness towards Nicholas and his autocratic rule. A widely quoted reaction was "we no longer have a Tsar".

== In culture ==
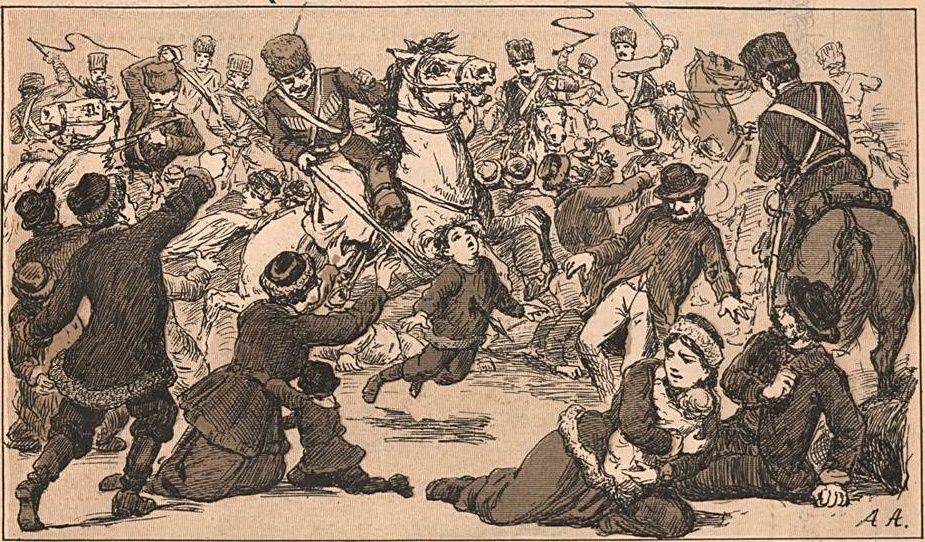
Cossacks and more of the tsar's forces killing and whipping men, women and children (Angelo Agostini, O Malho, nº 128, 25/02/1905).

Soviet actor, film director and screenwriter Vyacheslav Viskovsky (1881–1933) told the story of Bloody Sunday in his 1925 silent feature film Devyatoe yanvarya ("The Ninth of January"). Dmitri Shostakovich's 1957 11th Symphony, subtitled The Year 1905, is a programmatic work centered on Bloody Sunday. The second movement, entitled "The Ninth of January", is a forceful depiction of the massacre. The sixth of Shostakovich's 1951 Ten Poems on Texts by Revolutionary Poets (whose music the symphony quotes) is also called "The Ninth of January". Shostakovich's father and uncle were both present at the march that day, a year before the composer's birth. Maxim Gorky's novel The Life of a Useless Man (1908) portrays the effects of Bloody Sunday on the Russian working class and operations of the spies employed by the tsar.

== See also ==
- Bibliography of the Russian Revolution and Civil War
- Outline of the Russian Revolutions of 1905 and 1917 and Civil War
- Index of articles related to the Russian Revolution and Civil War
- The St. Petersburg workmen's petition to the Tsar (9 January 1905)
