= Polina Karelina =

Bahamian chess player born 2001

Personal information
- Born: 19 May 2001 (age 25) Kyiv, Ukraine

Chess career
- Country: Bahamas
- Title: Woman FIDE Master (2024)
- Peak rating: 1984 (April 2026)

Polina Karelina (born 19 May 2001) is a Bahamian chess player who holds the title of Woman FIDE Master. As of February 2026, Karelina was the highest rated player in the Bahamas.

== Early life and career ==
Karelina was born in Ukraine and moved to the Bahamas when she was four years old. She grew up on Paradise Island.

Karelina learned to play chess at age four. At six, she won the under-10 championship in the Bahamas, and at eight she became the under-18 scholastic champion.

In 2009, Karelina represented the Bahamas at the World Youth Chess Championship in the under-8 girls category. In 2011, she competed in the World Youth Chess Championship in the under-8 and under-10 girls sections. That year, at age ten, Karelina became the youngest ever Bahamas Junior Chess Champion. In 2012, she won the Kyiv under-12 girls championship.

In 2016, Karelina was awarded the Woman Candidate Master title following her performance in the women's 2.3.5 sub-zonal tournament in Barbados. The same year, she competed at the Susan Polgar Foundation Girls' Invitational in Saint Louis, Missouri, placing 25th of 64 players.

In 2017, Karelina won the Bahamas Junior Championship. In 2018, she represented the Bahamas in the open section at the 43rd Chess Olympiad in Batumi, Georgia. In March 2019, Karelina won the Bahamas Junior Chess Championship, placing first in the under-18 and under-20 categories. In 2022, She competed as a member of the open team at the 44th Chess Olympiad in Chennai, India.

In 2024, Karelina earned the title of Woman FIDE Master. In September of the same year, she represented the Bahamas in the women's section at the 45th Chess Olympiad in Budapest, Hungary.
