= Georgy Gapon =

Russian Orthodox priest (1870–1906)

The Reverend Georgy Gapon
- Георгий Гапон
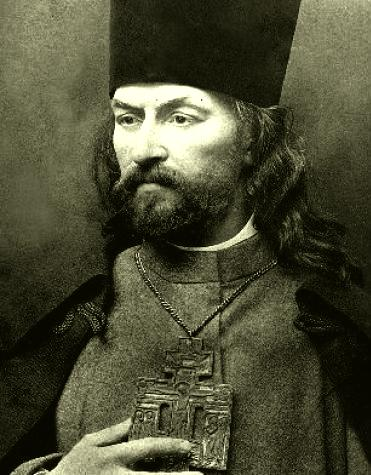
- Born: Georgy Apollonovich Gapon; 17 February 1870; Bilyky, Poltava Governorate, Russian Empire (now Ukraine)
- Died: 10 April 1906 (aged 36); Saint Petersburg, Russian Empire
- Cause of death: Assassination by hanging
- Occupations: Cleric; political activist
- Spouse: Vera (died c. 1898)

Ecclesiastical career
- Religion: Christianity (Eastern Orthodox)
- Church: Russian Orthodox Church

Signature
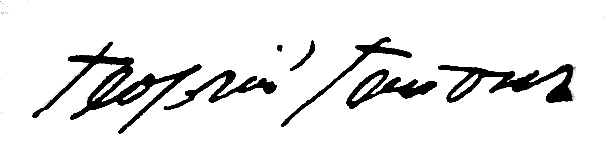

Georgy Apollonovich Gapon (Note: Ukrainian: Гапон Георгій Аполлонович, Russian: Гео́ргий Аполло́нович Гапо́н.) (17 February [O.S. 5 February] 1870 –10 April [O.S. 28 March] 1906) was a Russian Orthodox priest of Ukrainian descent and a popular working-class leader before the 1905 Russian Revolution. Father Gapon is mainly remembered as the leader of peaceful crowds of protesters on Bloody Sunday, when hundreds of them were killed by units of the Imperial Russian Army firing or charging into the crowds. Father Gapon is also known for his cooperation with the Okhrana, the Russian secret police, as well as with the Socialist Revolutionary Party, which had been banned on account of its terrorist activities.

Gapon knew that Nicholas II was away from the Winter Palace following an assassination attempt a few days prior. He nonetheless mobilized the socialists and many regular people from the crowd, and marched to the Winter Palace on that day to petition. It is unknown what exactly happened before the situation escalated and the first shots were fired, but the ensuing fiasco contributed to the Tsar's declining popularity.

== Early life ==
Georgy Apollonovich Gapon was born 17 February [O.S. 5 February] 1870, in the village of Bilyky, Poltava Governorate, Russian Empire (now Ukraine). He was the oldest son of a Cossack father and mother who hailed from the local peasantry. Gapon's father, Apollon Fedorovich Gapon, had some formal education and served as an elected village elder and clerk in Bilyky. His mother was illiterate and religiously devout and actively raised her son in the norms and traditions of the Russian Orthodox Church.

Gapon was an excellent primary school student and was offered a place at the Lower Ecclesiastical School in Poltava, a seminary that offered Gapon the best prospect for advancing his formal education. In his final year at this school, Gapon was first exposed to the radical philosophical teachings of Leo Tolstoy through one of his instructors, a devoted follower of the Russian writer. This instructor, I. M. Tregubov, regarded Gapon as one of the top students at the school, serious and intelligent in demeanour and diligent and curious in his studies.

Following his graduation from the Lower Ecclesiastical School, Gapon was admitted to Poltava Seminary, where he continued to be guided in his study of Tolstoy's ideas by other local followers. Gapon was influenced by the Tolstoyan emphasis on working with the poor and with its philosophical criticism with the formalistic and hierarchical practices of the official church. This brought him into conflict with certain seminary officials, who threatened to rescind his educational stipend. Gapon met this threat by himself rejecting further aid and seeking to pay for his own education through work as a private tutor.

Gapon fell ill from typhus, which incapacitated him for a time, making it impossible to earn a living as a tutor and continue his studies effectively. He decided to abandon plans for a career as a priest, seeking instead to attend Tomsk University to become a physician, so as to be of greater service to the ailing poor. His plans were short-circuited, however, when the seminary issued him a less-than-perfect grade for behaviour, thereby effectively barring his path to further university education.

At the age of 23, Gapon took a job in Poltava as a zemstvo statistician, supplementing his income with money earned working as a private tutor. It was in this capacity that he met the daughter of a local merchant in a house in which he was giving private lessons. The family objected to a proposed marriage due to Gapon's limited employment horizons, however, and as a means of overcoming this obstacle he again sought to become a priest. He made an appeal to Bishop Ilarion of Poltava, apologizing for past behaviour and promising to fulfill expectations of the church in the future. The bishop was moved by the appeal and interceded with the family, winning the couple permission to marry.

Gapon was placed on the fast track to priesthood, occupying a place as a church psalm reader for a year, followed by a pro forma promotion to deacon for just one day before being made priest of the Poltava cemetery church. Gapon's services were innovative and informal, and his church rapidly grew in size, negatively impacting other more formalistic local churches, whose priests lodged complaints against him. Nevertheless, Gapon continued to enjoy the support of the bishop in his position and was largely satisfied with his station in life.

== Move to Saint Petersburg ==
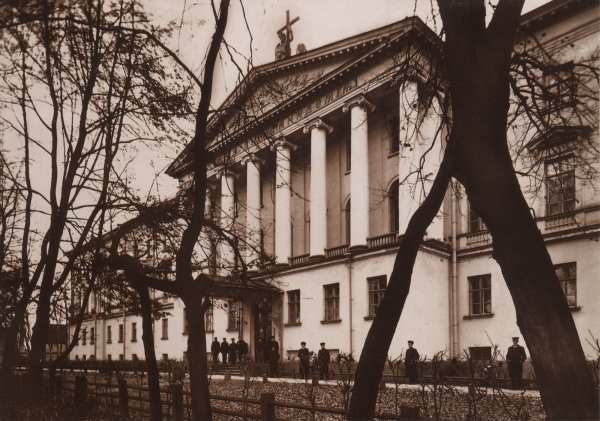
Saint Petersburg Theological Academy, attended by Georgy Gapon, was one of four religious academies of the Russian Orthodox Church. The school was a training facility for theologians.

Gapon and his wife had two children in rapid succession, but his wife fell ill following the 1898 birth of the second child, a boy. She died not long afterward, and Gapon decided to leave Poltava to make a new life in the capital city of Saint Petersburg. Bishop Ilarion made a strong recommendation to Konstantin Pobedonostsev, Procurator of the Holy Synod, that Gapon be allowed to take the entrance examination to the Saint Petersburg Theological Academy despite his lack of the standard Seminary certificate. Gapon placed 16th of 67 applicants and was subsequently awarded a scholarship reserved for the top prospects at the school. He would be one of 235 students to regularly attend classes at the school in 1898.

During his first year at the Saint Petersburg Academy, Gapon became involved in missionary work for the church through the Society for Religious and Moral Enlightenment in the Spirit of the Orthodox Church. As part of this activity Gapon helped to conduct religious discussions in industrial shops, mess halls, and lodging houses, bringing him into close contact with the urban proletariat for the first time. The tightly wound Gapon found the strain of missionary work plus the demands of academic life to be too great and fell into a state of acute depression and he began skipping classes. He withdrew from school on a medical leave of absence and spent almost a year in Crimea in an attempt to regain his psychological health.

Gapon's status as a student at the Saint Petersburg Theological Academy, one of the elite theological training institutions of the Orthodox Church, placed him in good graces with Bishop Nikolai of Taurida, who permitted Gapon to live in a monastery near Sebastopol without having to take monastic vows. In Crimea, he met several prominent members of the Tolstoyan movement, all of whom were intensely critical of the Orthodox Church and urged Gapon to leave the priesthood. Gapon rejected this advice, choosing instead to return to course work in Saint Petersburg in November 1899, renewed and reinvigorated.

Gapon became a religious teacher at the St. Olga children's orphanage in 1900 and became involved in working with factory workers and families impoverished by unemployment.

== Bloody Sunday ==
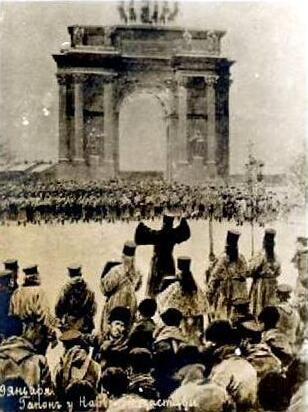
Gapon near Narva Gate

With the financial support of Colonel Akashi Motojiro of the Imperial Japanese Army, Gapon organized the Assembly of Russian Factory and Mill Workers of Saint Petersburg, which was also patronized by the Department of the Police and the Saint Petersburg Okhrana and received support from Ivan Fullon, then Governor-General of Saint Petersburg. The Assembly's objectives were to defend workers' rights and to elevate their moral and religious status. He was the person to lead the industrial workers to the capital of Russia during the year 1905. Only persons of Russian Orthodox faith were eligible to join the ranks. He received support from the police-sponsored trade unions established by Okhrana Chief Sergei Zubatov before their disbandment in 1903. The organization professed loyalty to the Russian Empire, beginning its meetings with the Lord's Prayer and concluding them with the imperial national anthem "God Save the Tsar!" At the same time, the Assembly had radical demands. Before the 1905 Russian Revolution, Gapon preached that the Tsar was a benevolent leader appointed by divine right who wanted to make fundamental reforms but was constantly thwarted by the boyars. Soon the organization had twelve branches and 8,000 members, and Gapon tried to expand activities to Kiev and Moscow.

From the end of 1904, Gapon started to cooperate with radicals who championed the abolition of Tsarist autocracy.

On 22 January [O.S. 9 January] 1905, the day after a general strike burst out in Saint Petersburg, Gapon organized a workers' procession to present an emotionally charged written petition to the Tsar. The demonstration ended tragically as police fired upon the workers; the incident came to be known as Bloody Sunday. Gapon's life was saved by Pinhas Rutenberg, a member of the Socialist Revolutionary Party who took him away from the gunfire and changed his priestly garments to a common man's. He then became the guest of Maxim Gorky.

Following Bloody Sunday, Gapon anathematized the Tsar and called upon the workers to take action against the regime, but soon after escaped abroad, where he had close ties with the Socialist Revolutionary Party. Gapon and Rutenberg were welcomed in Europe both by prominent Russian émigrés Georgi Plekhanov, Vladimir Lenin, and Peter Kropotkin and French socialist leaders Jean Jaurès and Georges Clemenceau. He found sanctuary in Geneva and in London at 33 Dunstan House, Stepney, with anarchists Peter Kropotkin and Rudolf Rocker. After the October Manifesto, before the end of 1905, Gapon returned to Russia and resumed contact with the Okhrana.

== Death ==
Gapon soon told Rutenberg about his contacts with the police and tried to recruit him too, reasoning that dual loyalties were helpful to the workers' cause. Instead, Rutenberg reported this provocation to his party leaders Boris Savinkov and Yevno Azef who was secretly a police spy. On 26 March 1906, Gapon arrived to meet Rutenberg in a rented cottage outside Saint Petersburg, and after a month he was found there hanged. Rutenberg asserted later that Gapon was condemned by a comrades' court. In reality, three SR party combatants overheard their conversation from the next room. After Gapon had repeated his collaboration proposal, Rutenberg called the comrades into the room and left. When he returned, Gapon was dead. Gapon died on 10 April [O.S. 28 March] 1906.

== Works ==
- St. Petersburg Workmen's Petition to the Tsar
- The Story of My Life (An autobiography by Gapon written just after the Bloody Sunday tragedy)
