= Osvobozhdeniye =

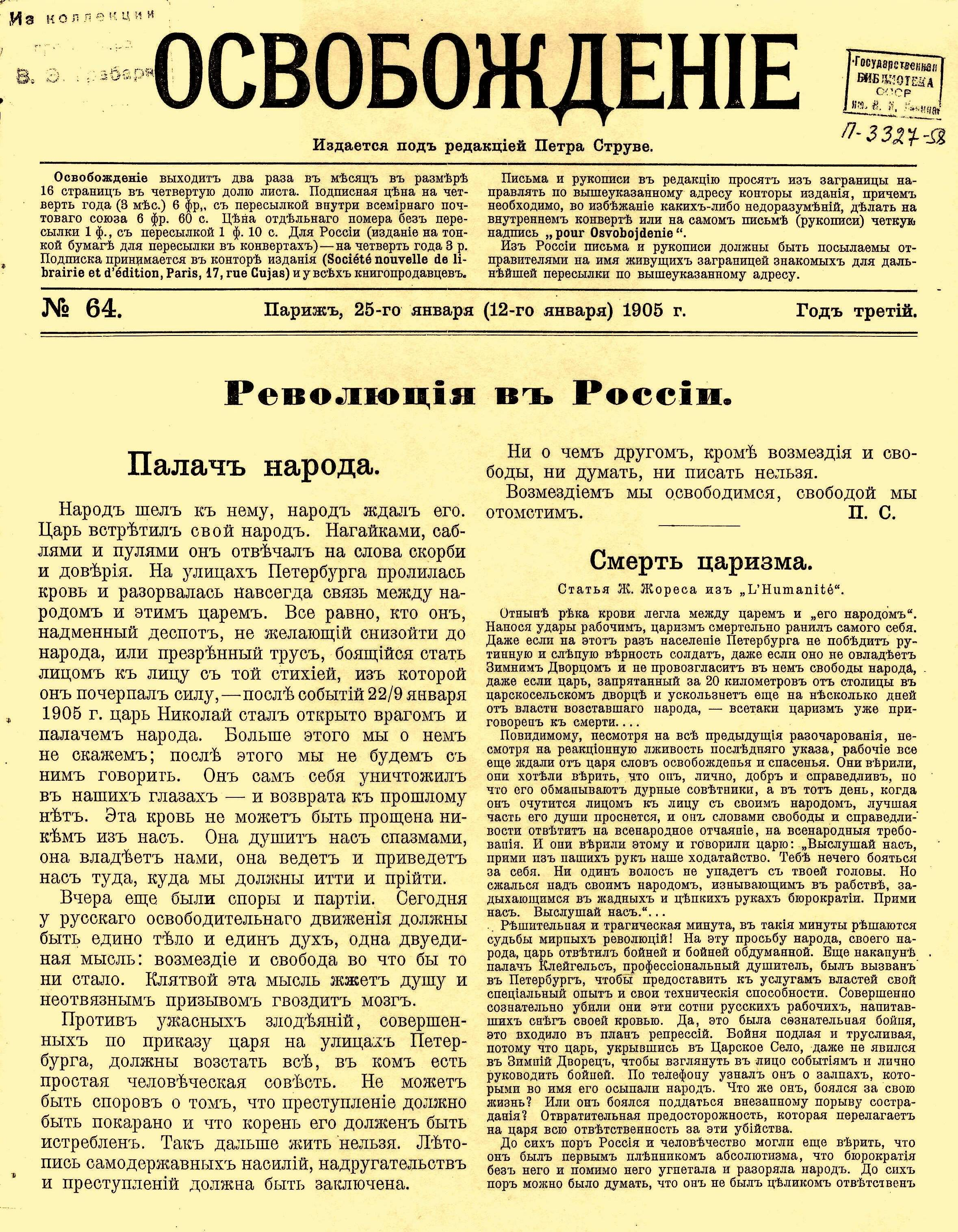
Cover the issue for January 1905

Osvobozhdeniye ("Liberation") was a liberal magazine during the final revolutionary years of the Russian Empire, prior to the October Manifesto in 1905. The periodical was established in 1902, and was in clandestine circulation until 1905. It was published in Stuttgart (Germany) and Paris (France), successively.

The publication was on a regular basis smuggled into Russia and enjoyed a wide readership. It advocated the establishment of a constitutional monarchy, alongside the granting of full civil rights in Russia.

Contributors included Pavel Milyukov, who for a short period of time in 1917 would become Foreign Minister, and Pyotr Struve, who perhaps was most influential as editor of Osvobozhdeniye.
