= Social patriotism =

Ideology that combines patriotism and socialism

Social patriotism is a critical Marxist term for socialists who support their own nation and government during war, placing national loyalty above international working class solidarity. It became especially associated with socialist parties that backed their governments during the First World War, a position Lenin condemned as a betrayal of socialist internationalism.

Social chauvinism can be described as aggressive or fanatical patriotism, particularly during time of war, in support of one's own nation (e.g., government, culture, etc.) versus other nation(s), displayed by those who are socialists or social democrats, including in the countries formerly colonised by European nations. During World War I, most left-wing political parties took a social-chauvinist stand, with few exceptions. Most socialists gave up their anti-militarism and their belief in international unity among the working class in favour of "defense of the fatherland", and turned to social-chauvinism, most notably the German Social Democratic Party and the French Section of the Workers' International.

A break with social patriotism was called, leading to the foundation of a Third International.

== Effects on industrial action ==
The consequence of the policy on labor relations within the combatant countries was something called Burgfriedenspolitik in Germany, a term deriving from the medieval concept of "peace (especially between feuding families) within a besieged city". Other countries had their own terms, such as the Sacred Union in France and the União Sagrada in Portugal. By such means, strikes and other forms of industrial action were to end for the duration. From 1916 onward, however, illegal labor strikes in Germany began to increase in number due to eroding wages as well as food and energy shortages. In June 1916, for example, over 50,000 laborers in Berlin went on strike to protest the jailing of Karl Liebknecht. In April 1917 the government responded with military force after workers in Berlin and Leipzig rioted over bread rationing. The culmination of the strikes came in January 1918 when over a million workers walked off the job. After the First World War, compounded with the example of the Bolsheviks winning a revolution, a longing for the conditions which had transpired during the war was a major motivation for fascism.

== Zimmerwald Conference, September 1915 ==
At the International Socialist Conference at Zimmerwald, the social patriots were identified as "the openly patriotic majority of the formerly Social-Democratic leaders" in Germany. In France and Austria the majority were also so identified, while in Britain and Russia some, such as Henry Hyndman, the Fabians, the Trade-Unionists, Georgi Plekhanov, Ilya Rubanovich and the Nasha Zarya were mentioned. Following the conference, the political journal Vorbote was established with Anton Pannekoek as editor. In the introduction to the first issue, Pannekoek called for an "uncompromising struggle" against social patriots as well as open imperialists, leading to the foundation of a Third International through breaking with social patriotism.

== Second Congress, 1920 ==
Following the founding of the Communist International the 21 conditions adopted at the Second Congress (1920) stipulated:

"6. Every party that wishes to belong to the Communist International is duty-bound to expose not only overt social patriotism but also the duplicity and hypocrisy of social pacifism; to explain systematically to the workers that without the revolutionary overthrow of capitalism, no international courts of arbitration, no treaties of any kind curtailing arms production, no manner of “democratic” renovation of the League of Nations will be able to prevent new imperialist wars."

== Critics ==
Two notable examples of Communists who fought against social-chauvinism in Germany during World War I were Rosa Luxemburg and Karl Liebknecht. They advocated proletarian internationalism, believing that common social relations united workers across any national boundaries. A common slogan used against social-chauvinism is "No War but the Class War".

== See also ==
- Bourgeois nationalism
- Chauvinism
- Class collaboration
- Proletarian internationalism
- Social fascism
- Social imperialism
- World revolution
- Yellow socialism
