= Socialist League of the New East =

1927–1929 Russian political organization

Socialist League of the New East Социалистическая лига нового Востока
- Leader: Viktor Chernov
- Founded: 1927
- Dissolved: 1929
- Split from: Socialist Revolutionary Party
- Newspaper: Vestnik Sotsialisticheskoy Ligi Novogo Vostoka
- Ideology: Socialism; Self-determination

The Socialist League of the New East (Russian: Социалистическая лига нового Востока, sotsialisticheskaia liga novogo vostoka, abbreviated СЛНВ, SLNV) was a Russian political émigré organization based in Czechoslovakia. The organization was founded in 1927. Its leaders included the Russian Socialist-Revolutionaries Viktor Chernov, V. Y. Gurevich, Shreider, and Fedor S. Mansvetov, the Ukrainian Socialist-Revolutionaries Mykyta Shapoval, Hrihoriev, and Mandryka, and Belarusian and Armenian socialist-oriented politicians. Chernov's group had broken their links to the foreign representation of the Socialist-Revolutionary Party before founding the new organization.

Politically, the Socialist League of the New East defended the right to self-determination of the national minorities of the Soviet Union, calling for the breakup of the Union into separate states. This position caused the final split between Chernov and the majority of other émigré Russian Socialist-Revolutionaries. Furthermore, the position of the Socialist League for a New East on self-determination for minorities was condemned by the Labour and Socialist International. The position of the League on the national question troubled the Czechoslovak authorities, who feared the implications if such a political discourse would ring a bell or take root amongst minority groups inside Czechoslovakia.

The organization began publishing Vestik sosialisticheskoi ligi novogo vostoka ("Messenger of the Socialist League of New East") in Prague in 1929. In the same year, however, Chernov left Czechoslovakia for the United States, and the organization ceased its activities.
