= Tambov electoral district =

Constituency of the Russian Republic

Tambov
- Former Civilian constituency for the All-Russian Constituent Assembly
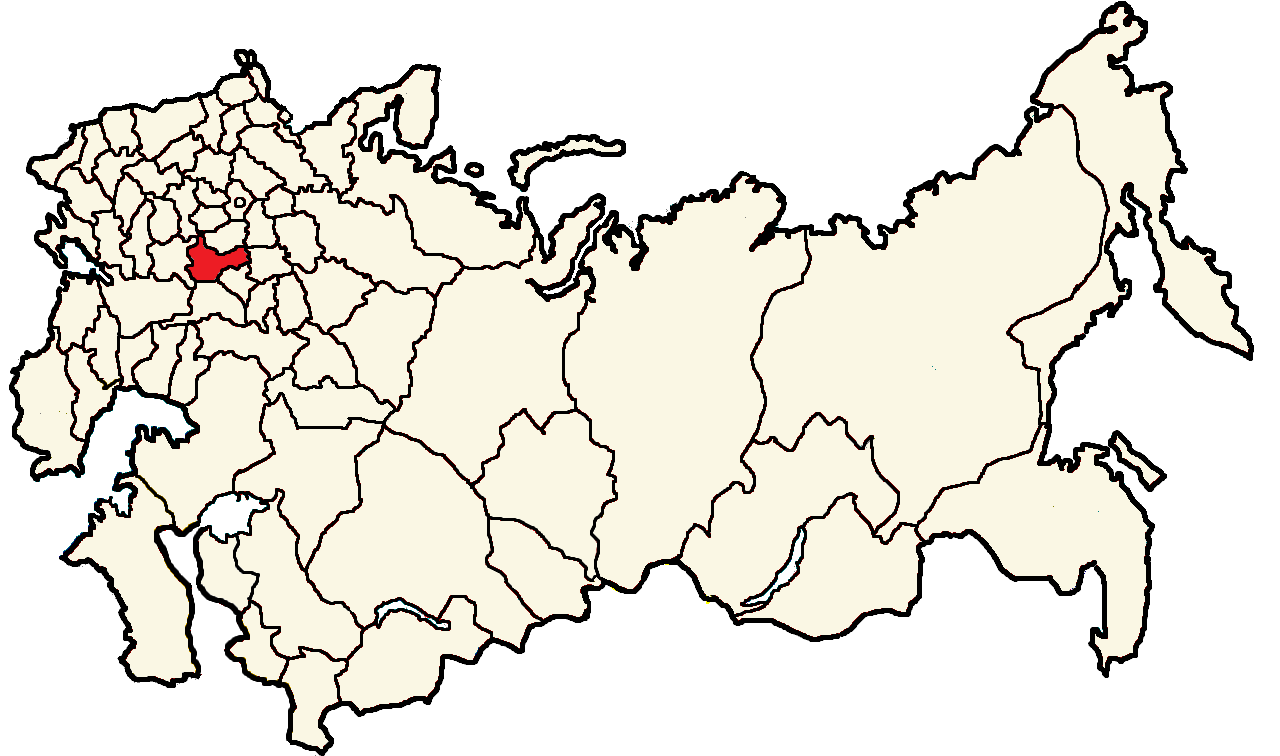

Former constituency
- Created: 1917
- Abolished: 1918
- Number of members: 16
- Number of Uyezd Electoral Commissions: 12
- Number of Urban Electoral Commissions: 1
- Number of Parishes: 337

The Tambov electoral district (Russian: Тамбовский избирательный округ) was a constituency created for the 1917 Russian Constituent Assembly election.

The electoral district covered the Tambov Governorate. 73% electoral participation rate was reported, as the SRs had a good mobilization capacity among the peasantry. In the Spassko-Kashminskaia canton, Morshansk uezd the SR local government banned the Bolshevik election campaign, alleging that the Bolsheviks were German spies.

== Results ==
Tambov
Party	Vote	%
List 1 - Socialist-Revolutionaries and Governorate Soviet of Peasants Deputies	835,556	71.22
List 7 - Bolsheviks	240,652	20.51
List 5 - Kadets	47,548	4.05
List 3 - Mensheviks	22,425	1.91
List 2 - Union of Landowners	12,493	1.06
List 4 - Popular Socialists and Congress of Cooperative Organizations	7,408	0.63
List 8 - Party of the Muslim Socialist-Democratic Bloc	6,222	0.53
List 6 - Uezd Peasants List	887	0.08
Total:	1,173,191	

Deputies Elected
Batmanov	SR
Bobynin	SR
Chernov	SR
Chernyshov	SR
Ilyin	SR
Kiselev	SR
Kondratenkov	SR
Merkulov	SR
Nabatov	SR
Nemtinov	SR
Odintsov	SR
Ryabov	SR
Sletova-Chernova	SR
Volsky	SR
Moiseev	Bolshevik
Olminsky	Bolshevik
Schlichter	Bolshevik
