= Anastasia Sletova-Chernova =

Russian politician

- Анастасия Слётова-Чернова
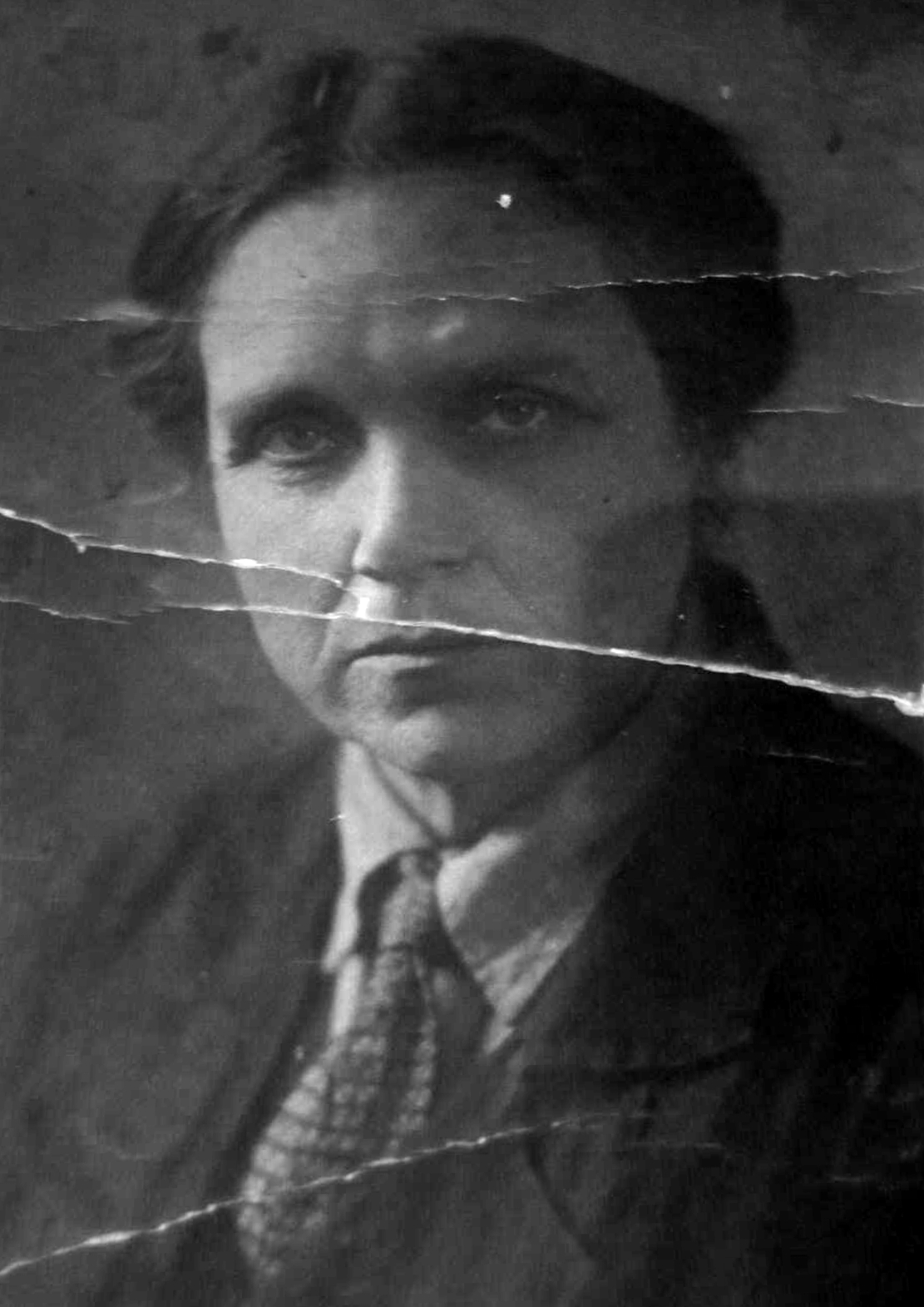
- Chernova in 1922

Member of the Constituent Assembly
- In office 18 January 1918 – 19 January 1918 (Note: The Constituent Assembly was declared dissolved by the Bolshevik-Left SR Soviet government, rendering the end the term served.)
- Constituency: Tambov

Personal details
- Born: 1873; Tambov, Russian Empire
- Died: 1938; Leningrad, Soviet Union
- Political party: Socialist Revolutionary Party
- Spouse: Viktor Chernov
- Children: Boris, Maria

Anastasia Nikolaevna Sletova-Chernova (Russian: Анастасия Николаевна Слётова-Чернова, 1879–1938) was a Russian educator and politician. In 1917 she was one of the ten women elected to the Constituent Assembly, the country's first female parliamentarians.

== Biography ==
Sletova-Chernova was born in Tambov in 1873. She was educated at a local gymnasium, after which she worked as a teacher. She studied extracurricular education abroad and became head of a Sunday school and the Society for the Organisation of Public Readings. In 1898 she married Viktor Chernov; the couple emigrated the following year, and in 1901 were founders of the Socialist Revolutionary Party.

Living in Kozlov at the time of the Russian Revolution, in 1917 she and Victor were Socialist-Revolutionary candidates in Tambov in the Constituent Assembly elections, and she one of ten women elected to the legislature. After the Bolsheviks forced the Constituent Assembly to be dissolved, she was subsequently arrested on several occasions and imprisoned in 1921. In 1938 she was included in Stalin's shooting lists, but died in prison before her case could be heard.
