= Nikolay Rusanov =

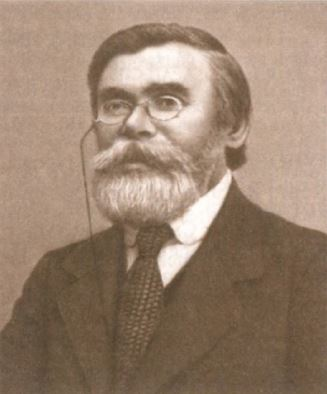
Nikolay Rusanov

Nikolay Sergeyevich Rusanov (Russian: Никола́й Серге́евич Руса́нов; September 28 [O.S. September 16], 1859 – July 28, 1939), also known under the pseudonyms of K. Tarasov and N. Kudrin, was a Russian revolutionary who connected the revolutionary populist movement of the 1870s with the revolutionary parties of the early twentieth century, particularly the Russian Socialist-Revolutionary Party (PSR).

== Biography ==
Rusanov was born in 1859 in Oryol. He studied medicine at the Medical and Surgical Academy in St. Petersburg, where he became involved in radical student politics. He supported the populist (narodnik) movement and in 1877 joined the group 'Land and Liberty' (Zemlya i Volya). When the group split in 1879, Rusanov sided with 'The People's Will' (Nardodnaya Volya). This group emphasised urban organisation over rural agitation among the peasants and also endorsed political terrorism as a tactic. The group assassinated Tsar Aleksandr II in 1881. Although Rusanov was not directly involved in the plot, the repression which followed caused him to flee into exile in 1882. He remained in Western Europe, mostly in France and Germany, until 1905.

Rusanov was one of the earliest Russian revolutionaries to be strongly influenced by Marxism, after reading Marx' Das Kapital, The Communist Manifesto and The Civil War in France. He contributed articles to some early Marxist journals and deployed Marx' thesis that the economic 'basis' determines the political 'superstructure' to argue against the Jacobin voluntarism and élitism of Lev Tikhomirov, the leading ideologue of 'The People's Will' in exile. Rusanov also rejected the popular view among narodniki that capitalism had not yet taken firm root in Russia and could still be avoided. These views put him closer to G.V. Plekhanov, the founder of Russian Social-Democracy, than to populism. Nevertheless, he was attracted to 'The People's Will' and later the PSR for its revolutionary élan. He found in Nikolai Danielson a welcome interpretation of Marxism that did not seem to require a long period of capitalist development.

In the early 1890s, Rusanov helped found the Group of Old Members of the People's Will, together with the venerable revolutionary veteran P.L. Lavrov, I. A. Rubanovich and others. From 1893 to 1896, Lavrov and Rusanov co-edited the seven issues of Materials for the History of the Russian Social Revolutionary Movement. During these years Rusanov also met Friedrich Engels, whom he impressed by reciting Pushkin from memory. In 1901, Rusanov, Rubanovich and M.R. Gots co-founded the journal Herald of the Russian Revolution (Vestnik russkoi revoliutsii), which became the theoretical organ of the Socialist-Revolutionary Party (PSR). Rusanov also contributed to legal Russian journals under the pseudonym 'N. Kudrin'.

The PSR emerged at the end of the 1890s and held its first congress in 1901. It united revolutionary socialists who, for various reasons, objected to the "orthodox" Marxism of the Russian Social-Democratic Workers Party (RSDRP), and who looked back to the indigenous Russian revolutionary tradition of Alexander Herzen, Peter Lavrov, Nikolay Chernyshevsky, Nikolai Danielson, and others. Ideologically and tactically the PSR was quite diverse, comprising anti-Marxists as well as professed Marxists, advocates and opponents of political terror, those who favoured organisation among urban workers and those who emphasised rousing the peasantry. Rusanov joined the PSR in 1901, together with such venerable veteran revolutionaries as Vera Figner. While remaining in exile he and Rubanovich were instrumental in establishing the PSR's contacts with Western socialist parties and with the Second International, which the PSR eventually joined.

The abortive Russian Revolution of 1905 brought Rusanov back to Russia, where he participated in the creation of workers' councils (soviets) - a tactic Lenin then still opposed. In 1914, the PSR, like most European socialist parties, split into 'Defencists' who supported Russia's war effort and 'Internationalists' who opposed it. Rusanov tried to steer a centrist course, like V.M. Chernov. In 1917 he was selected by the PSR as a delegate to the international socialist peace conference in Stockholm. After the February Revolution of 1917, Rusanov supported the Provisional Government and A.F. Kerensky. He opposed the Bolshevik October Revolution and in 1918 emigrated to Western Europe. At first he settled in Berlin, but eventually he moved to Bern, Switzerland, where he died in 1939. He wrote his memoirs in two parts, published under the titles In Emigration (1929) and In the Homeland (1931).
