= Mikhail Gots =

Russian revolutionary and editor (1866–1906)

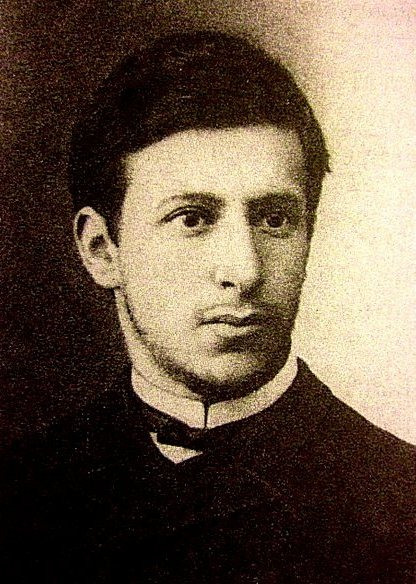
Mikhail Gots

Mikhail Rafailovich Gots (Russian: Михаи́л Рафаи́лович Гоц; 1866 – 26 August 1906) was a Russian revolutionary, member of 'The People's Will' (Narodnaya Volya) and one of the founders of the Socialist-Revolutionary Party (PSR). He was the older brother of Avram Gots.

== Life and career ==
Gots was born in Šiauliai in the Kovno Governorate of the Russian Empire (present-day Lithuania) into a wealthy Jewish family. He studied at the University of Moscow and joined 'The People's Will' in 1884. In October 1886 he was arrested and banished to Siberia. In 1889 he took part in a convicts' uprising in Yakutsk and was sentenced to hard labour in Siberia for life. In 1895 an amnesty enabled Gots to emigrate to Paris, where he collaborated with Nikolai Rusanov and Ilya Rubanovich in editing the PSR newspaper Herald of the Russian Revolution (Vestnik Russkoi Revoliutsii). With Victor Chernov, Gots also edited the PSR's theoretical journal, Revolutionary Russia (Revoliutsionnaia Rossiia). Gots was also instrumental in establishing relations between the PSR and French and Italian socialist parties. In 1901, the Russian government demanded Gots' extradition from Italy. This led to a diplomatic crisis and to the cancellation of the Tsar's proposed visit to Italy. Gots died of cancer in 1906.
