= Agrarian Socialist League =

Revolutionary organization of Russian exiles

The Agrarian Socialist League was a revolutionary organization of Russian exiles. The organization was founded in 1900, in connection with the funeral of Pyotr Lavrov. The Agrarian Socialist League emerged as the most prominent of the revolutionary exile groups, as it gathered several prominent figures amongst its ranks. As the Agrarian Socialist League assembled both the older generation of Narodnik revolutionaries as well as younger Socialist-Revolutionaries, it became a key constituent in forming the Socialist-Revolutionary Party. Members of the organization included Volkhovskii, Chaikovskii, I. A. Rubanovich, Lazarev, Chaim Zhitlowsky, Shishko, D. A. Khilkov, D. A. Klements, S. M. Kliachko, Rappoport, Victor Chernov, M. R. Gots, Sletov, and Serebriakov. The Agrarian Socialist League sought to form a socialist collective society based on the Russian peasantry, espousing a rather orthodox version of Russian populism.

During 1900–1901 the Agrarian Socialist League issued various publications: two editions (1,000 copies each) of the manifesto "The immediate question of the revolutionary cause" and five propaganda pamphlets intended to be distributed amongst peasants ("How the Minister takes care for the peasants", "How the Hungarian peasants are fighting for their rights", "Peasant unions in Sicily", "Sketches from Russian history", and "Conversations about the land", each between 1,000 and 2,000 copies). This literature was well received in Russia (particularly amongst a group of Socialist-Revolutionary intellectuals in Saratov), but smuggling the texts into the country was a hazardous task. By late 1901 the organization uncovered that the comrade in charge of the smuggling efforts (N. K. Pauli) was a police infiltrator and that most of the smuggled literature had been seized at the border.

In 1902 the Agrarian Socialist League and the Socialist-Revolutionary Party jointly published 80,000 copies of propaganda literature. In 1903 the two organizations jointly published 30,000 copies. The Agrarian Socialist League was able to make some profit from sales of literature in exile, for example in 1903 the organization made a profit of 3,500 roubles.

The Agrarian Socialist League held its first conference in July 1902. At the conference, Zhitlowsky and Shishko proposed that the movement promote peasant terrorism on a "political-moral" basis.

The Agrarian Socialist League retained a separate organizational identity from the Socialist-Revolutionary Party, maintaining that it should have full internal autonomy and would only be federally connected to the party. However, in 1903 the League merged into the Foreign Organization of the party. When the Agrarian Socialist League affiliated itself to the Socialist-Revolutionary Party, it accorded a historical legitimacy to the new party, enabling the party to mobilize a broad range of scattered populist groups.
