= Dmitry Khilkov =

Socialist revolutionary (1858–1914)

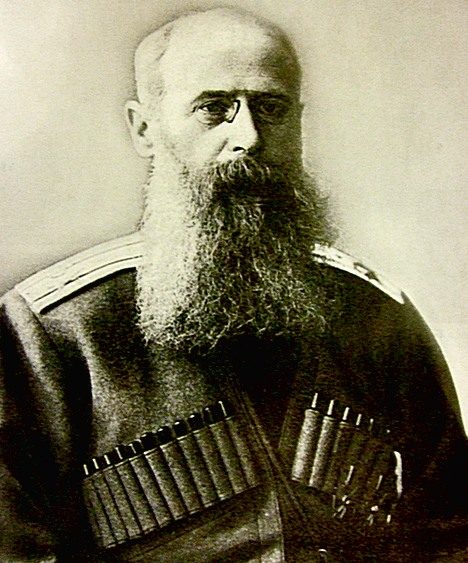
Dmitry Khilkov in 1914

Prince Dmitry Aleksandrovich Khilkoff (most often spelled Khilkov, sometimes also Hilkov or Hilkoff) (1858–1914) went from being an officer in the Czar's Army to a Tolstoyan preaching Pacifism to a Socialist Revolutionary.

Prince Dmitry Khilkov was an aristocratic disciple of Leo Tolstoy who was exiled by the government and had his children taken away from him for following Tolstoy's teachings. Like Tolstoy, Khilkov became involved with emigration of the Spiritual Christian Doukhobors in Russia to Canada, and he was part of an 1898 settlement exploratory delegation to Canada.

In July 1899 Khilkov returned to Europe, and to Switzerland where his family were then living. Initially working closely with Biriukov and the Tolstoyans, Dmitrii was soon to renounce his former pacifism and by 1902 was advocating mass terrorism in Russia to overthrow the Tsarist regime. He became acquainted with leaders of the revolutionary movement, finally joining the Socialist Revolutionary Party in 1903. His chief activity at this time was the publication and distribution of revolutionary literature particularly aimed at persecuted sectarians in Russia. He urged also the formation of armed fighting squads to lead the revolutionary struggle. The Revolution of 1905 appeared to signal the imminent end of Tsarism, but Khilkov's hopes of a general uprising were not to be. At the end of the year he returned to Russia under the general amnesty and finally left the Socialist Revolutionary Party, repelled by the hypocrisy of its leaders and the infiltration of provocateurs. His deep concern for the peasants remained and during 1905–1906 he participated in the active peasant movement in Sumy. Before long, however, this movement was suppressed and the revolutionary momentum in Russia stalled by government reaction. It became clear to Khilkov that the path of revolution offered no hope and the direction of his life once more began to change. From 1907 he began to abandon his radical views and was drawn increasingly towards the Orthodox Church.

The military threat to Russia stirred Dmitrii to volunteer to rejoin his old Cossack regiment with his former rank of lieutenant colonel. Early in World War I, in October 1914, while leading a patrol on the Eastern front in Galicia, Dmitrii Khilkov was killed by a single shot. His body was returned and buried at Pavlovki.
