= Viktor Chernov =

Russian revolutionary and politician (1873–1952)

- Виктор Чернов
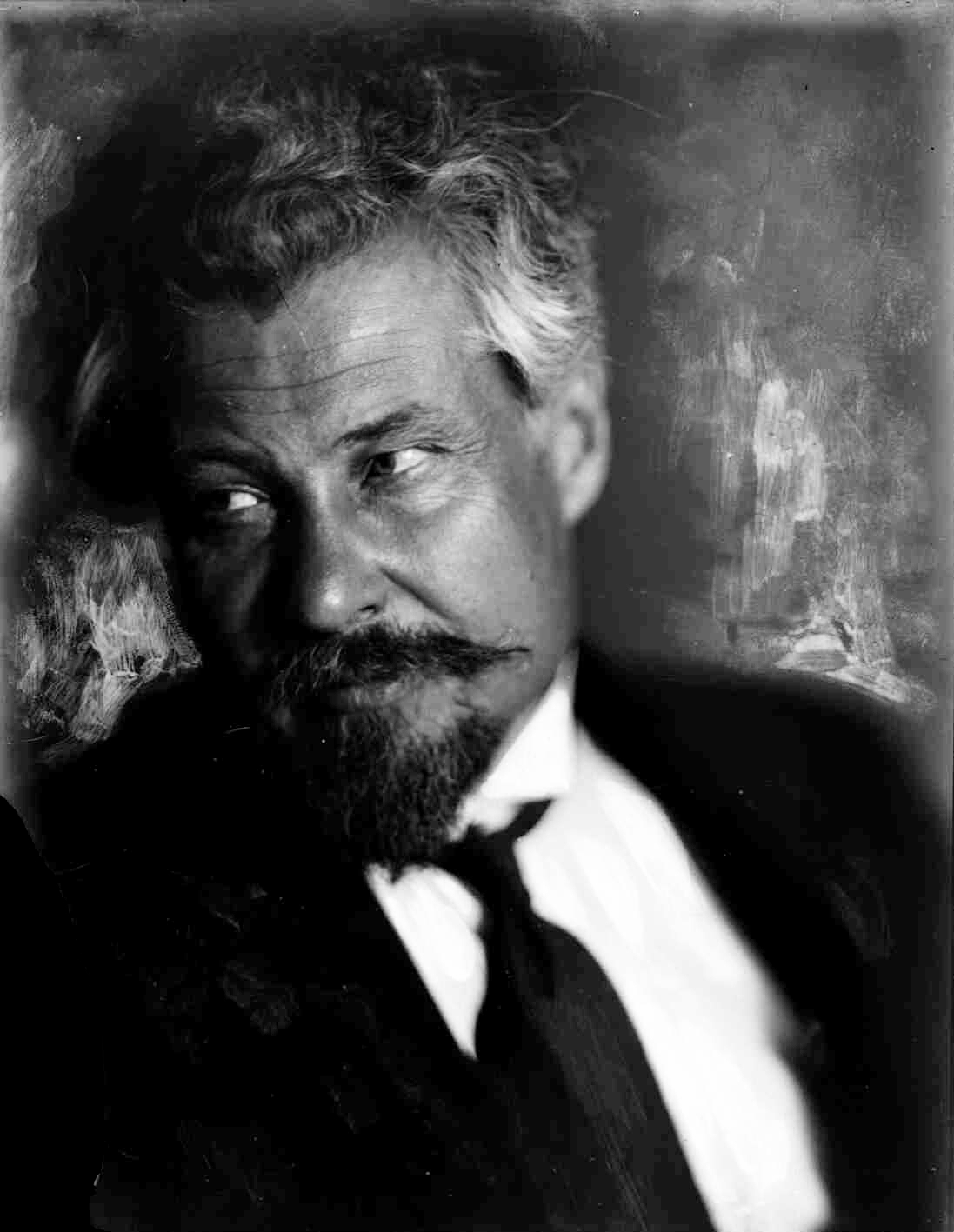
- Chernov in 1917

Chairman of the Russian Constituent Assembly
- In office 18 January 1918 – 19 January 1918
- Preceded by: Position established
- Succeeded by: Position abolished

Minister of Agriculture of the Russian Provisional Government
- In office 5 May 1917 – 26 August 1917
- Prime Minister: Georgy Lvov; Alexander Kerensky
- Preceded by: Andrei Shingaryov
- Succeeded by: Semyon Maslov

Member of the Russian Constituent Assembly
- In office 18 January 1918 – 19 January 1918 (Note: The Constituent Assembly was declared dissolved by the Bolshevik-Left SR Soviet government, rendering the end the term served.)
- Preceded by: Constituency established
- Succeeded by: Constituency abolished
- Constituency: Tambov

Personal details
- Born: 7 December 1873 Kamyshin, Russia
- Died: 15 April 1952 (aged 78) New York City, U.S.
- Party: People's Rights Party (1893–1894); Socialist Revolutionary Party (1902–1940)
- Spouse: Anastasia Sletova
- Children: 5
- Education: Imperial Moscow University
- Occupation: Revolutionary; Politician; Philosopher

Viktor Mikhailovich Chernov (Note: In this name that follows East Slavic naming customs, the patronymic is Mikhailovich and the family name is Chernov.) (Russian: Виктор Михайлович Чернов; 19 November 1873 – 15 April 1952) was a Russian revolutionary, politician, and theorist who was a principal founder and leader of the Socialist Revolutionary Party (PSR). As the party's chief ideologist, he developed the theory of "constructive socialism", which combined elements of Russian populism and Marxism, advocating for a two-stage revolution leading to an agrarian socialist society.

Born in Saratov Governorate to a minor noble and former serf, Chernov became involved in revolutionary circles in his youth. He was instrumental in uniting disparate populist groups to form the PSR in the early 1900s. Chernov's political thought emphasized an alliance between the urban proletariat and the peasantry, with the former as a vanguard, and critiqued orthodox Marxist interpretations of class by including all "toilers" as part of the revolutionary force. He championed land socialization—the transfer of land to communal control for egalitarian use—as a core tenet of the PSR's program.

After the February Revolution of 1917, Chernov returned to Russia from exile and served as Minister of Agriculture in the Russian Provisional Government from May to September 1917. His inability to enact significant land reforms during his tenure, due to opposition within the coalition government and his own perceived indecisiveness, contributed to rising peasant unrest and weakened his political standing. Following the Bolshevik seizure of power, Chernov advocated for a "third force" democratic alternative against both the Bolsheviks and the White counter-revolutionaries. In January 1918, he was elected President of the Russian Constituent Assembly, which was forcibly dispersed by the Bolsheviks after a single day. Harassed by the Cheka, he went into hiding and eventually left Russia in 1920.

He spent the remainder of his life in exile, primarily in Europe and later in New York City, where he continued to write, engage in émigré politics, and critique the Soviet regime. Described as the party's "brain", Chernov was part of the original PSR leadership "trinity" alongside Grigory Gershuni ("will") and Mikhail Gots ("heart"). The premature deaths of Gershuni and Gots left Chernov unequal to the practical demands of party leadership. Despite his significant theoretical contributions, Chernov's political career was ultimately marked by the failure of the PSR to achieve its revolutionary goals and his own self-admitted weakness of will and preference for theory over practical politics. He died in New York in 1952.

== Early life and revolutionary beginnings ==
Chernov was born on 19 November 1873, in Kamyshin, Saratov Governorate, on the Volga River. His father, Mikhail Chernov, was born into a peasant serf family but became a rural school teacher and later a district treasurer in the tsarist service, eventually attaining personal nobility and the title of Councillor of State. Chernov's grandfather had been a serf who gained his freedom. Chernov's mother died when he was an infant. He described his relationship with his stepmother as oppressive, leading him to find solace in the company of street children and fostering an empathy for the "humiliated and insulted". From his father, he claimed to have inherited a "plebeian outlook on life".

In his adolescence, Chernov was deeply influenced by Russian literature, particularly the poet Nikolay Nekrasov, whose work he felt "breathed life into the 'people'". He immersed himself in the writings of authors like Alexander Herzen, Vissarion Belinsky, Nikolay Chernyshevsky, and Fyodor Dostoevsky. His political awakening occurred in the latter half of the 1880s, spurred by his elder brother, Vladimir, who introduced him to a political circle organized by a Tolstoian army officer. In 1890, Chernov was briefly taken into custody and questioned due to his political activities. Towards the end of his schooling in Saratov, he met the veteran Populist Mark Natanson, whom he described as a remarkable "organiser". To avoid further police attention, Chernov moved to Dorpat (now Tartu, Estonia) in autumn 1891 to continue his studies, where he formed an organizational circle and befriended Karl Parts, a member of the Estonian Constitutional Democratic Party.

In 1892, Chernov enrolled in the Faculty of Law at Moscow University. It was here that he first encountered the writings of Karl Marx, studying them critically rather than as a convert. He became involved in a populist student organization called the "Union of Soviets", which irregularly published a journal. Through Natanson, Chernov became associated with the Narodnoe Pravo (People's Right Party), also known as the narodopravtsy, founded in 1893. The party aimed to unite revolutionary and liberal elements to overthrow despotism, with a program that included demands for representative government, universal suffrage, and freedoms of religion, press, and assembly.

In April 1894, at the age of twenty, Chernov was arrested along with other members of the People's Right Party, including his brother Vladimir and sister Nadejda. The police accused him of playing a prominent role in the party and possessing illegal publications. While in custody, he wrote an autobiographical account for his interrogators. Initially held in Petropavlovsk Fortress in St. Petersburg, he was later transferred to a less stringent detention center, where he had access to reading material and wrote an article titled "Philosophical flaws in the doctrine of economic materialism". He read works by Immanuel Kant, Marx, and Russian Marxists like Georgy Plekhanov and Peter Struve. Chernov believed that the Russian peasant commune (obshchina) and cooperative habits were "priceless moral survivors of primitive socialism" and argued that capitalism in Russia would play a destructive, rather than creative, role.

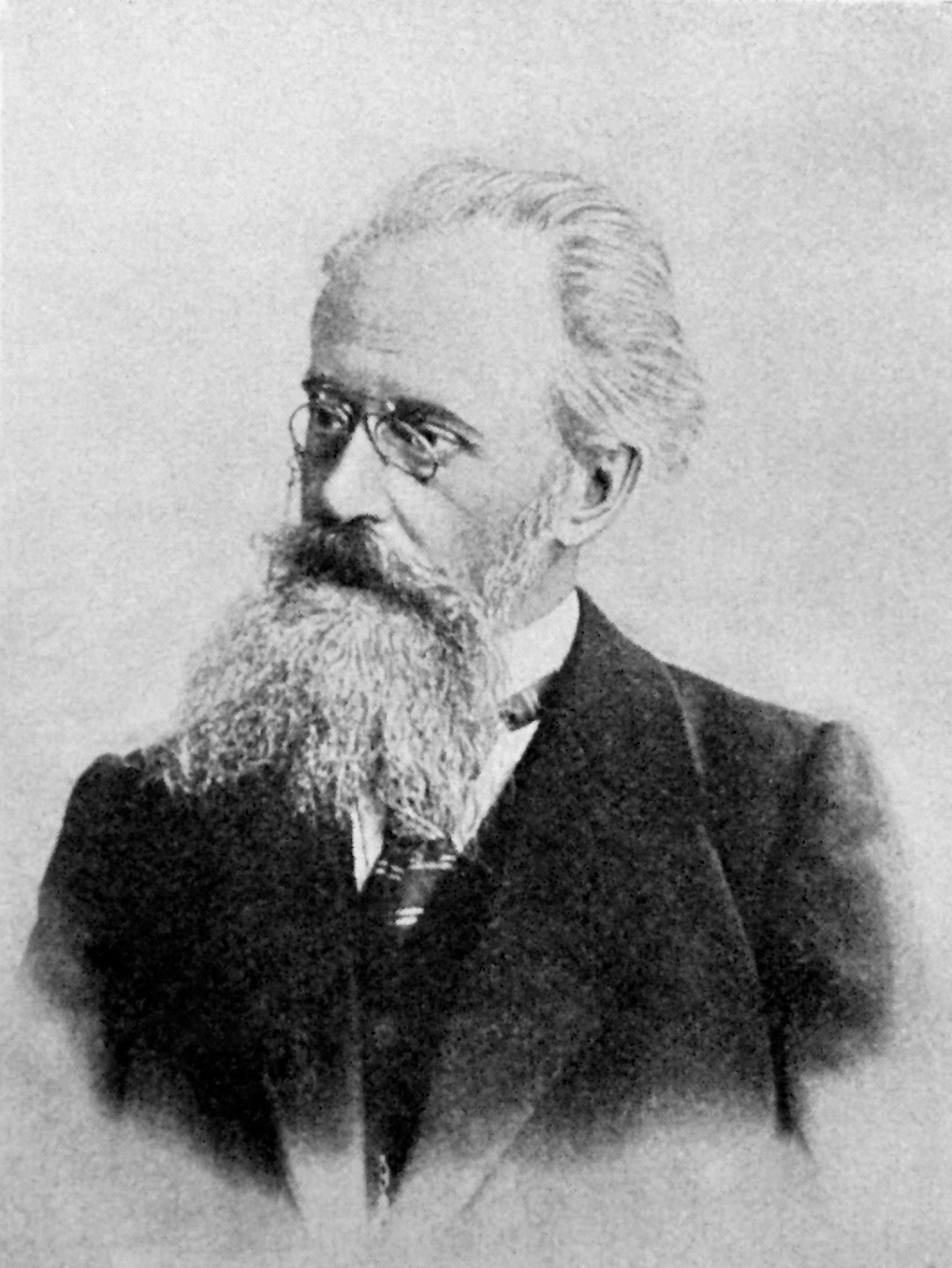
Nikolay Mikhaylovsky

In January 1895, after nine months of imprisonment, Chernov was released and exiled to his native province of Saratov, first to Kamyshin and then to Tambov. In Tambov, a region rife with agrarian unrest, Chernov, along with Anastasia Sletova (his future first wife) and others, initiated a revolutionary peasants' organization in 1896–97, forming "brotherhoods" that spread through the province until the large-scale insurrection of 1905. This neo-populist "going to the people" movement aimed to build an alliance between the urban proletariat and the "labouring peasants". After his period of "administrative exile" (1895–1899), Chernov obtained a passport to go abroad in 1899. Before leaving, he met Nikolay Mikhaylovsky in St. Petersburg, a leading populist thinker whom Chernov would later refer to as his "friend, collaborator, teacher, my second father". Mikhailovsky, who advocated for a "subjective method" in sociology and believed in Russia's potential for a non-capitalist path to socialism based on the peasant commune, gave Chernov his blessing to study European socialism at its source. In 1899, Chernov left Russia for Switzerland.

== Formation of the Socialist Revolutionary Party ==
=== Émigré activities and Agrarian Socialist League ===
Arriving in Zurich in 1899, Chernov found the Russian émigré community dominated by young social-democrats associated with Georgy Plekhanov's Emancipation of Labour Group. His populist sentiments found little support, but he was drawn to the Union of Russian Socialist Revolutionaries Abroad, led by Chaim Zhitlovsky. On Zhitlovsky's advice, Chernov moved to Berne to study and pursue philosophical research.

In January 1900, Chernov traveled to Paris to meet with the group around the veteran populist Pyotr Lavrov. Lavrov's group envisioned an autonomous émigré organization to support the peasant agrarian movement from abroad. Lavrov's death shortly after Chernov's arrival, in February 1900, paradoxically spurred the formation of the Agrarian Socialist League. At Lavrov's grave, Chernov co-founded the League with other young populists like Mikhail Gots and veteran populists including Semen An-skii, Leonid Shishko, Feliks Volkhovskoi, and Egor Lazarev. The League became a major source of radical literature smuggled into Russia, publishing 25,000 copies of material under the title Socialist Revolutionary Party Abroad by early 1902.

=== Neo-populist ideology ===
While with the Agrarian Socialist League, Chernov articulated the core tenets of what would become known as neo-populism or "constructive socialism". In his 1900 essay Ocherednoi vopros revoliutsionnogo dela (The Immediate Task of the Revolutionary Cause), he argued that Russia's future lay in a party that could unite the interests of both the industrial working class and the toiling peasantry, drawing on the traditions of Zemlya i Volia rather than the elitist terrorism of Narodnaya Volya. This marked a significant departure from earlier populism by acknowledging the emergence of capitalism and an industrial proletariat in Russia. Chernov advocated for an alliance between peasants and workers, with the proletariat acting as the vanguard and the peasantry as the mass strike-force.

He challenged the classical Marxist view of the peasantry as a uniformly reactionary or petty-bourgeois class. Chernov distinguished between the "toiling peasantry" (trudovoe krest'ianstvo), who lived by their own labor, and the bourgeois capitalist. He argued that small producers were not petty capitalists because their primary goal was subsistence, not the extraction of surplus value through the exploitation of others. Their economic position, he maintained, was closer to that of the proletariat, as both were exploited classes. This redefinition of class, focusing on the source of income and relations of distribution rather than solely on the ownership of the means of production, was a cornerstone of his ideology and a key point of difference with Russian Social Democrats. He drew on Marx's earlier writings and classical economists like Adam Smith, as well as Russian thinkers like Chernyshevsky, to support his arguments.

Chernov's neo-populism recognized the inevitability of industrialization but rejected the idea that the peasant commune (obshchina) was the sole basis for socialism in Russia. While protective of the commune, he did not idealize it, seeing it as a potential facilitator for the transition to a collectivist economy, particularly in land socialization, rather than the direct foundation of a socialist order. The overthrow of autocracy, he argued, should be achieved not primarily through terror, but through a mass movement involving the peaceful withdrawal of labor and resources by the peasantry, guided by the intelligentsia and the proletariat.

=== Unification and establishment of the PSR ===
Symbol of the Socialist Revolutionary Party (PSR)

The impetus for a unified national populist party came largely from groups within Russia, particularly the Southern Union (founded in Voronezh in 1897) and the Northern Union (centered in Saratov and Moscow). The real work of unification was performed domestically, centered in Saratov, by figures like Ekaterina Breshko-Breshkovskaia and Grigory Gershuni. By the end of 1901, these disparate groups, along with smaller circles and the émigré Agrarian Socialist League, had merged to form the Socialist Revolutionary Party (PSR). Mikhail Gots and Chernov were key figures in formalizing the union among the émigré factions.

The party's newspaper, Revoliutsionnaia Rossiia (Revolutionary Russia), previously an organ of the Northern Union, was transferred to Switzerland under the editorial direction of Chernov and Gots, becoming the official voice of the united PSR. A Central Committee was established, including figures like Natanson, Breshko-Breshkovskaia, Nikolay Rusanov, Chernov, Gots, and Gershuni. The party adopted the slogan "V bor'be obretesh ty pravo svoe" (In Struggle thou Shalt Win thy Rights!).

Despite the unification, divergent views persisted within the PSR, particularly regarding the revolutionary role of the peasantry versus the urban proletariat. The Northern Union tended to prioritize the proletariat and intelligentsia, viewing the peasantry as a secondary support base. The Southern Union, while also emphasizing urban work, recognized the necessity of peasant support. Chernov and the Agrarian Socialist League, though often seen as pro-peasant, advocated for a balance, with the proletariat as vanguard leading peasant masses. The peasant uprisings of 1902 in Kharkov and Poltava, however, significantly shifted party attention towards agrarian issues and spurred Chernov's development of the land socialization program.

Chernov played a crucial role in clarifying the party's program, strategy, and tactics, which were articulated in party newspapers and the 1903 collection On Questions of Program and Tactics. His concept of the "toiling class", uniting workers, peasants, and the radical intelligentsia, became a fundamental, though often debated, tenet of PSR theory. The party also joined the Socialist International, reflecting its proletarian component. The PSR's attitude towards political terror was complex. Chernov, co-authoring the party's foundational article on the subject with Gershuni, considered terror a subordinate weapon for self-defense and disorganization of the regime, not an end in itself. The party's Combat Organization (Boevaia Organizatsiia) operated with considerable autonomy, which sometimes conflicted with the party leadership's desire for control and integration of terror with mass movements.

== 1905 Revolution and First SR Congress ==
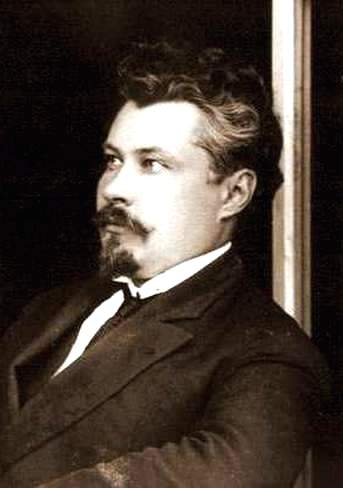
Viktor Chernov

The 1905 Russian Revolution reinforced Chernov's belief in a peasant-proletariat alliance and the necessity of party guidance for the spontaneous peasant movement. The SRs advocated for land socialization through direct action, urging peasants to seize and communally manage gentry, state, and appanage lands, aiming for an egalitarian distribution based on the right to toil. This contrasted with the Social Democrats, who, including Vladimir Lenin at this stage, viewed the peasantry primarily as petty bourgeois and focused on supporting the rural proletariat against the peasant bourgeoisie. Chernov and the PSR envisioned the revolution as a process that could move beyond a purely bourgeois framework. While political freedom was the immediate goal, the party aimed for significant socio-economic reforms, particularly land socialization, as part of a minimum program. Chernov argued that the revolution, driven by workers and peasants under the leadership of the intelligentsia, could establish a democratic republic and then transition to social revolution without a lengthy pause, with the Paris Commune as a model.

During 1905, SRs participated in the formation of workers' Soviets and the All-Russian Peasant Union. Chernov welcomed the extension of the "Union of Unions" to include worker and peasant trade unions alongside professional groups, seeing it as embodying his "triple alliance" concept. The party initially decided to boycott the consultative Duma proposed in August 1905, planning to turn the boycott into a general attack on autocracy. Following the October Manifesto, which granted civil liberties and a legislative Duma, Chernov returned to Russia from Geneva in late October 1905. He established the legal party newspaper Syn Otechestva (Son of the Fatherland) in St. Petersburg, entering into a difficult collaboration with Legal Populists from the Russkoye Bogatstvo circle, which collapsed over tactical disagreements.

The First SR Party Congress convened in Imatra, Finland, from 29 December 1905 to 4 January 1906. Chernov was the chief spokesman on the party program, which he had largely compiled; the congress acclaimed him as "the young giant who has borne on his shoulders for five years the whole burden of the theoretical elaboration of our program". The program was divided into maximum and minimum sections. The minimum program focused on achievable goals after overthrowing tsarism, primarily land socialization. It rejected Roman law concepts of property in favor of declaring land the "belonging of all the people" (obshchenarodnoe dostoianie), to be administered decentrally for equal use based on one's own labor, a process he termed "socialization" rather than "nationalization". The maximum program outlined the future socialist society, including collectivization of agriculture and industry, to be implemented once the masses attained sufficient consciousness and organization.

This two-stage approach was criticized by some party factions. The SR Maximalists, led by M.I. Sokolov, argued for the immediate socialization of both land and industry in the minimum program, viewing Chernov's distinction as reformist. Chernov countered that socializing industry was a more complex task requiring higher organizational maturity than land socialization and thus belonged to the maximum program. The Legal Populists (who later formed the Popular Socialist Party) also criticized the program, preferring "nationalization" to "socialization" of land and rejecting revolutionary land seizures. Despite these debates, Chernov's program was largely adopted, though the Maximalists seceded after the Congress. The Congress also resolved to boycott the First Duma.

== Inter-revolutionary period (1906–1914) ==
The years following the 1905 Revolution were marked by government repression and internal crises for the PSR. At the party's London conference in 1908, Chernov acknowledged that while ideological influence had grown, organizational strength had significantly declined. Many members who had joined during the revolutionary upsurge became disillusioned.

A devastating blow to the party was the exposure of Evno Azef in late 1908 as a long-term agent provocateur for the Okhrana, who had simultaneously headed the PSR's Combat Organization from 1903 to 1908. Chernov had previously defended Azef against accusations of treachery. The Azef affair led to deep demoralization and intensified debates about the role of terror. At the Fifth Party Conference in May 1909, Chernov, while personally favoring cessation, abstained from voting on the continuation of terror due to his Central Committee position; the conference voted to continue it. Chernov argued that terror was justified when it reflected the "popular conscience" and was a means of self-defense and disorganization of the regime, but he grappled with its moral and ethical implications, often reducing it to individual responsibility. The practice of terrorism largely died out after the Azef exposure.

The Stolypin reforms, aimed at breaking up the peasant commune and fostering private land ownership, directly challenged the PSR's agrarian program. In response, Chernov "refounded" the agrarian program by shifting its ideological basis. He argued that the program's validity did not depend on the continued existence of the obshchina, but on the peasantry's deep-seated "equalizing tendency". This collectivist principle, he maintained, would naturally lead to socialization as the only way to ensure equal land use after redistribution. By thus detaching the party from an institution doomed to extinction, Chernov adapted neo-populism to changing rural realities, moving it further from its utopian origins. At the First Party Conference in London (August 1908), resolutions were passed to campaign for the collectivist aspects of peasant psychology against individualism. By 1911, under the impression of Stolypin's temporary successes, the party began to accept the small, market-oriented farmer as a potential ally.

== World War I and internationalism ==
The outbreak of World War I in July 1914 deeply divided the Socialist Revolutionaries. Chernov, along with Mark Natanson, became a leading figure of the internationalist wing, opposing the war and advocating for revolution. At a conference of SR émigrés in Beaugy-sur-Clarens, Switzerland, in August 1914, Chernov argued that the war was not defensive for Russia, which had dynastic rather than national goals, and that Russia's defeat could lead to a "people's government". This marked an early articulation of a revolutionary defeatist stance.

Chernov advocated for the formation of a "third force" of the working masses of Europe to intervene and force a just peace, without annexations or indemnities, and to seize power where possible, leading to a wider European revolution. He believed Russia, with its unpopular regime, could be the first to present revolutionary opportunities. He co-edited the internationalist newspaper Mysl (Idea) in Paris from November 1914, which, despite French censorship, promoted an anti-war, revolutionary line. Mysl was succeeded by Zhizn (Life) in March 1915, later moved to Geneva, and then by Na chuzhbine (On Foreign Soil) and Otkliki zhizni (Echoes of Life) in early 1916.

Chernov was an enthusiastic participant in the Zimmerwald Conference in September 1915, which brought together anti-war socialists. He reported that SR organizations in Russia were largely internationalist. Although he voted for the Zimmerwald Manifesto, he refused to sign it, criticizing its failure to sufficiently emphasize Russian dynastic interests in starting the war and the suffering of the peasantry. By early 1916, the SR Foreign Delegation of the Central Committee had a majority against the war. Chernov's precise activities and whereabouts for much of 1916 are unclear, but he appears to have largely withdrawn from prominent internationalist activities during this year.

== Russian Revolution of 1917 ==
Chernov was in Switzerland when the February Revolution occurred. He returned to Russia via France and Britain, arriving in Petrograd on 8 April 1917, five days after Lenin. He was elected to the Executive Committee of the Petrograd Soviet. The SR party initially supported the Provisional Government without participating in it.

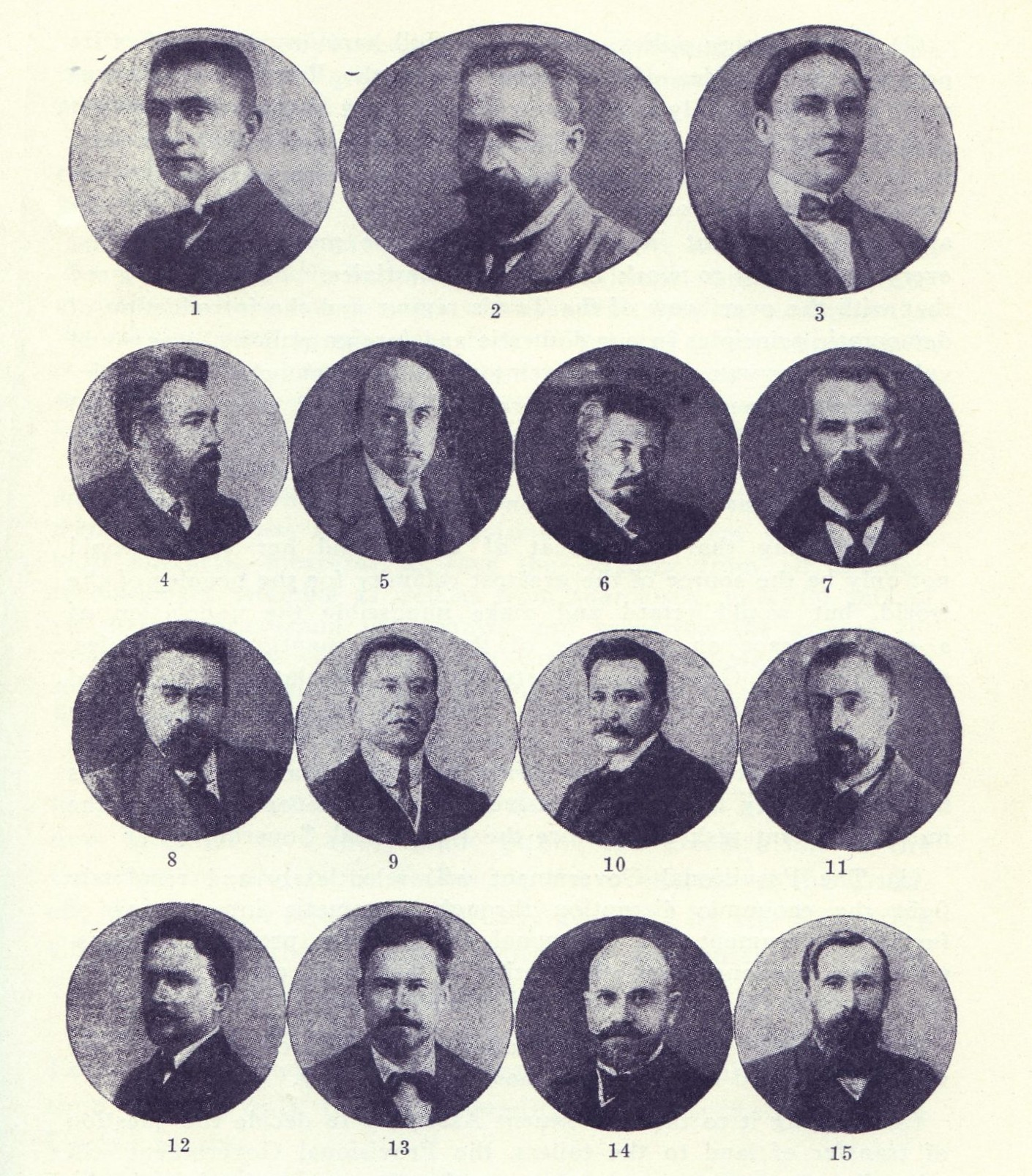
Members of the Russian Provisional Government's second governing coalition, August 1917. Chernov is #6.

Following the April Crisis, Chernov became Minister of Agriculture in the first coalition government formed in May 1917. His tenure was marked by significant challenges in implementing the SR agrarian program of land socialization. His program for the interim period involved suspending the Stolypin reforms, prohibiting all further land transactions, and transferring all land to the administration of local land committees until the Constituent Assembly. He managed to secure the abolition of the Stolypin land laws in June and July 1917 but faced constant opposition from within the government—particularly from Kadet ministers, Prince Georgy Lvov, and later Prime Minister Alexander Kerensky—over the prohibition of land sales and the transfer of land to committee control. The crucial law transferring land to the committees was repeatedly blocked in the cabinet.

The Third SR Party Congress in May–June 1917 ratified the party's participation in the government but revealed deep divisions, particularly on the war. A centrist resolution drafted by Abram Gots, advocating continued war efforts while seeking peace, was passed over Chernov's more Zimmerwaldian position. Chernov's own competing resolution on the war was suppressed in a confused and contentious vote, marking a key defeat that demonstrated his loss of control over the party machinery to Gots's right-center faction. His influence, though still significant, was waning, as evidenced by his running 20 votes behind Gots in elections to the Central Committee. The Congress failed to adequately address the land question or formulate a concrete peace proposal, deferring major decisions to the Constituent Assembly.

During the July Days, Chernov was briefly seized by angry Kronstadt sailors demanding the Soviet take power and was rescued by Leon Trotsky. He became a target of a fierce press campaign from the right, which accused him of "defeatism" and alleged connections to Germany, contributing to his isolation within the government. He resigned from the Provisional Government on 27 August 1917, during the Kornilov affair.

== Civil War, final exile, and death ==
During the decisive days of the October Revolution, Chernov, sensing the collapse of the Provisional Government and despairing of his party's ability to act, left Petrograd for a speaking tour, a move for which he was later criticized. After the Bolshevik seizure of power on 25 October 1917, Chernov's left-center faction initially pursued a strategy of waiting for the Bolshevik regime to discredit itself, opposing immediate armed resistance. He was briefly involved in a plan at Mogilev to form an alternative socialist government under his premiership, an initiative of the General Army Committee. The plan, however, failed due to lack of broad support and was actively thwarted by the right-center SR leadership of Abram Gots and Nikolai Avksentiev, who opposed a government headed by Chernov.

He participated in the Second All-Russian Peasants' Congress in November 1917, where he was elected honorary chairman but failed to secure the actual chairmanship against the Left SR Maria Spiridonova. At the Fourth (and last) SR Party Congress (26 November – 5 December 1917), Chernov was elected presiding officer, and his left-centrist faction gained a clear majority on the new Central Committee, displacing the Gots-Zenzinov faction. The Congress confirmed the expulsion of the Left SRs and passed resolutions reflecting the party's shift to the left, though Chernov's leadership ensured that the right-wing was censured but not alienated.

Chernov was elected President of the Russian Constituent Assembly, which convened on 18 January (O.S. 5 January) 1918. He was chosen by the dominant right-wing of the SR delegation, despite their having blackballed him from their own leadership bureau weeks earlier, as a "leftist decoy" and a figure of compromise necessary to hold the fractious SR delegation together and appeal to the broader revolutionary populace. In his inaugural address, Chernov outlined a program of land reform based on socialization and a foreign policy directed towards peace, attempting to stake out a "third way" between the Bolsheviks and the counter-revolution. After a single, tumultuous session lasting about 13 hours, the Assembly was dispersed by the Bolsheviks.

Following the dispersal, Chernov went into hiding. He supported the Committee of Members of the Constituent Assembly (Komuch) established in Samara in June 1918, which aimed to restore the Constituent Assembly. He advocated a "third force" democratic struggle against both the Bolsheviks on the left and the right-wing counter-revolutionaries like Admiral Alexander Kolchak. After Kolchak's coup in Omsk in November 1918 overthrew the Ufa Directory (in which SRs participated), Chernov continued to argue for this two-front war, even as the SRs were increasingly marginalized.

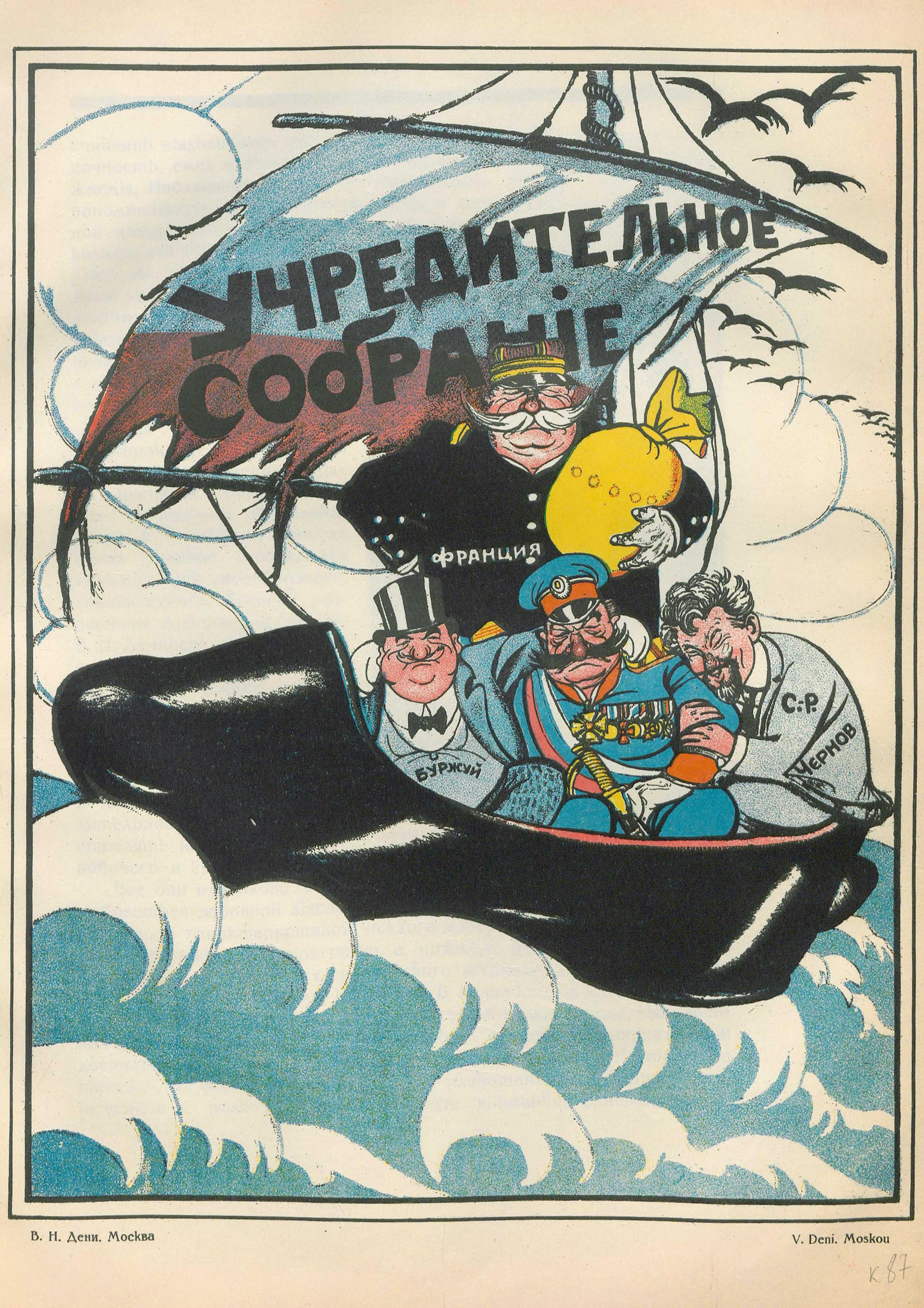
Constituent Assembly (1921), a Bolshevik cartoon by Viktor Deni. Chernov (right) is depicted with figures representing France, the bourgeoisie, and White general Anton Denikin.

Chernov returned to Moscow in March 1919 during a brief period of SR legalisation and published the newspaper Delo Naroda. However, repression soon resumed. In May 1920, advised by the SR Central Committee to leave the country, Chernov emigrated under a false Estonian passport. He initially settled in Reval (Tallinn), Estonia, where he resumed publication of Revoliutsionnaia Rossiia. He later moved to Berlin, where the SR Foreign Delegation produced the paper Golos Rossii (The Voice of Russia) in 1922, primarily to defend SRs during the Moscow Trial of SRs. Chernov successfully sued a German editor for libel after being accused of receiving German funds.

From Berlin, Chernov moved to Prague, Czechoslovakia, where he established an "SR centre". There, he worked on what he called "constructive socialism". He fled the Gestapo in 1938, going to Paris, and then to New York in 1940. In exile, he continued his political agitation and published the journal Za Svobody (For Liberty) until 1950. Viktor Chernov died on 15 April 1952, at the age of 78, in a small apartment in New York City.

== Legacy ==
Despite his theoretical contributions, Chernov's political career was marked by an inability to translate his ideas into effective action, particularly during his tenure as Minister of Agriculture in 1917. Historian Oliver H. Radkey describes him as having a "splendid mind and... powers of social analysis" comparable to major statesmen but combined this with a "weakness of will" and a "strain of pessimism" that limited his effectiveness as a revolutionary leader. He was often seen as inconsistent and indecisive in practical politics, prioritizing party unity and compromise over decisive action, which ultimately contributed to the PSR's failure to retain power or effectively counter the Bolsheviks. Radkey argues that the party's central tragedy was Chernov's default as leader of the left-center majority; possessing the vision and popular support to challenge the dominant right-wing faction, he continually "abdicated in the presence of the right SR's, stepping down from the throne to which the December congress had elevated him, rather than contest it with a willful opposition". This "prostration tendency" before figures like Gots rendered his formal leadership ineffective and left the party paralyzed. He himself admitted to being "more a theorist, a man of the writing table and platform, than a professional politician", a view shared by both his critics and his own memoirs.

== Selected works ==
- Ocherednoi vopros revoliutsionnogo dela (The Immediate Task of the Revolutionary Cause), London: Agrarian-Socialist League, 1900.
- Terroristicheskii element v nashei programme (The Terrorist Element in Our Program), 1902.
- Marksizm i agrarnyi vopros: istoriko-kriticheskii ocherk (Marxism and the Agrarian Question: A Historical-Critical Essay), St. Petersburg, 1906. (A collection of earlier articles).
- K teorii klassovoi borby (Towards a Theory of Class Struggle), Moscow, 1906.
- Proletariat i trudovoe krestianstvo (Proletariat and Toiling Peasantry), Moscow, 1906.
- Mes Tribulations en Russie Sovietique (My Tribulations in Soviet Russia), Paris: J. Povolozky, 1921. (Covers 1918–March 1919).
- Zapiski Sotsialista-Revoliutsionera (Notes of a Socialist-Revolutionary), Book 1, Berlin-Petersburg-Moscow: Z.I. Grzhebin, 1922. (Memoirs covering up to the late 1890s).
- Rozhdenie revoliutsionnoi Rossii (Fevralskaia revoliutsiia) (The Birth of Revolutionary Russia: The February Revolution), Paris-Prague-New York: Jubilee Committee for the Publication of the Works of Viktor Chernov, 1934. (An English abridged translation: The Great Russian Revolution, 1936).
- Pered Burei: Vospominaniia (Before the Storm: Memoirs), New York: Chekhov Publishing House, 1953. (Covers life up to 1918).

== See also ==
- Socialist League of the New East
