= Social imperialism =

Leninist description of certain ideologies

As a political term, social imperialism, also often referred to as "red imperialism", is the political ideology of people, parties, or nations that are, according to Soviet leader Vladimir Lenin, "socialist in words, imperialist in deeds".

Socialists in pre-WWI Germany and 20th century Russia who advocated for imperialism justified their views with select quotations from Marx about great nations conquering smaller nations, as well as Marx's denigration of Slavs. They also argued that anything that advances the power of a leading socialist state, including conquest and imperialism, is good because it ultimately advances socialism.

Some academics use this phrase to refer to governments that engage in imperialism meant to preserve the domestic social peace.

== Political use ==
The term "social imperialism" is a Marxist expression, typically used in a derogatory fashion. The phrase was first used in Marxist circles during the early 20th century discussions on the position of the international workers' movement towards the impending European war and particularly in regard to the Social Democratic Party of Germany. In this context it is very similar to, but not interchangeable with, the terms social chauvinism and social patriotism.

In the later decades the most significant use of the phrase has been in the Maoist critique of the Soviet Union. Mao Zedong argued that the Soviet Union had itself become an imperialist power while maintaining a socialist façade. Albanian leader and Chinese ally Enver Hoxha agreed with Mao in this analysis, before later using the expression to also condemn Mao's Three Worlds Theory amid the Sino-Albanian split.

== Academic use ==
The term has also been used by left-wing academics, especially in regard to modern German history. The academic use of the phrase is usually to describe governments that engage in imperialism meant to preserve the domestic social status quo. The left-wing German historian Hans-Ulrich Wehler has defined social imperialism as "the diversions outwards of internal tensions and forces of change in order to preserve the social and political status quo", and as a "defensive ideology" to counter the "disruptive effects of industrialization on the social and economic structure of Germany". Under Wehler's view, social imperialism was a device that allowed the German government to distract public attention from domestic problems and preserve the existing social and political order. Wehler argued that the dominant elites used social imperialism as the glue to hold together a fractured society and to maintain popular support for the social status quo. Wehler argued German colonial policy in the 1880s was the first example of social imperialism in action, and was followed up by the Tirpitz Plan for expanding the German Navy starting in 1897. In this point of view, groups such as the Colonial Society and the Navy League are seen as instruments for the government to mobilize public support. The demands for annexing most of Europe and Africa in World War I are seen by Wehler as the pinnacle of social imperialism.

The British Marxist historian Geoff Eley contends that there are three flaws to Wehler's theory of social imperialism. The first is that Wehler credits leaders such as Admiral Alfred von Tirpitz and Prince Bernhard von Bülow with a greater degree of vision than what they in fact possessed. The second is that many of the pressure groups on the right who advocated an imperialist policy for Germany were not the creations of the government, and in fact often demanded far more aggressive policies than what the government was willing to undertake. The third was that many of these imperialist lobbying groups demanded a policy of political and social reform at home, in addition to imperialism abroad. Eley argued that what is required in thinking about social imperialism is a broader picture with an interaction from above and below, and a wider view of the relationship between imperialism abroad and domestic politics.

One of the more notable uses of the social imperialism concept was by the British Marxist historian Timothy Mason who argued that World War II was caused by social imperialism. In Mason's opinion, German foreign policy was driven by domestic political considerations, and the launch of World War II in 1939 was best understood as a "barbaric variant of social imperialism". Mason argued that "Nazi Germany was always bent at some time upon a major war of expansion". However, Mason states that the timing of such a war was determined by domestic political pressures, especially as relating to a failing economy. According to Mason, by 1939, the "overheating" of the German economy caused by rearmament, the failure of various rearmament plans caused by the shortages of skilled workers, industrial unrest caused by the breakdown of German social policies, and a sharp drop in living standards for the German working class forced Hitler into going to war at a time and place not of his choosing. Mason contended that, when faced with the deep socio-economic crisis, the Nazi leadership had decided to embark upon a ruthless "smash and grab" foreign policy of seizing territory in Eastern Europe which could be pitilessly plundered to support living standards in Germany. Mason described German foreign policy as driven by an opportunistic "next victim" syndrome after the Anschluss, in which the "promiscuity of aggressive intentions" was nurtured by every successful foreign policy move. In Mason's opinion, the decision to sign the German-Soviet Non-Aggression Pact and to attack Poland, and with it risking a war with Britain and France, was an abandonment by Hitler of his foreign-policy programme, outlined in Mein Kampf and Zweites Buch, and was forced on him by the need to seize and plunder territory abroad in order to prevent the collapse of the German economy. Mason's theory of World War II as an act of social imperialism and as a sudden "flight into war" into 1939 was to involve him in the 1980s in a debate with the British historian Richard Overy.

== See also ==
- Chinese imperialism – Expansion of China's political, economic, military, and cultural influence
- Civilizing mission – Rationale or justification for colonialism
- Enlightened absolutism – Political philosophy
- Redwashing – Adopting inauthentic left-wing rhetoric for gain
- Social fascism – Communist term for social democracy in early 1930s
- Soviet empire – Term for Soviet foreign policy before 1989
