= The Civil War in France =

1871 pamphlet by Karl Marx

- Cover of the 1922 German edition
- Author: Karl Marx
- Language: English
- Subject: Paris Commune
- Publication date: 13 June 1871
- Publication place: England
- Pages: 35

The Civil War in France (German: Der Bürgerkrieg in Frankreich) is a pamphlet written and first published in 1871 by Karl Marx as an official statement of the General Council of the First International on the Franco-Prussian War and on the character and significance of the struggle of the Communards in the Paris Commune.

== Writing ==
Between the middle of April and the end of May 1871, London resident Karl Marx collected and compiled English, French, and German newspaper clippings on the progress of the Paris Commune, which pitted the radical workers of Paris against conservative forces from outside the city. Marx had access to French publications supported by the Commune as well as various bourgeois periodicals published in London in English and French. Marx also had access to personal interpretations of events passed along by several leading figures in the Commune and associates such as Paul Lafargue and Peter Lavrov.

Marx originally intended to write an address to the workers of Paris and made such a motion to the meeting of the governing General Council of the International on 28 March 1871, a proposal unanimously approved. Further developments in France made Marx think that the document should be instead directed to the working class of the world, and at the April 18 meeting of the General Council, he passed along that suggestion by noting his desire to write on the "general tendency of the struggle". The proposal was approved, and Marx began writing the document. Main writing on the publication seems to have taken place between 6 and 30 May 1871, with Marx writing the original document in English.

== Publication ==
The first edition of the pamphlet, a slim document of just 35 pages, was published in London on about 13 June 1871 as "The Civil War in France: Address of the General Council of the International Working-Men's Association". Only 1000 copies of the first edition were printed, and the pamphlet quickly sold out, to be followed by a less expensive second edition with a print run of 2000. A third English edition, containing a number of corrections of errors, appeared later in that same year. The pamphlet was translated into French, German, Russian, Italian, Spanish, Dutch, Flemish, Croatian, Danish, and Polish, and published both in newspapers and in pamphlet form in various countries in 1871 and 1872. The German translation was rendered by Marx's longtime associate, Friedrich Engels, and the first German publication was serialized in the newspaper Der Volksstaat in June–July 1871 followed by Der Vorbote in August–October 1871. A separate pamphlet edition was also published by the Volksstaat in Leipzig in that same year.

On the fifth anniversary of the fall of the Paris Commune, the German edition of the pamphlet was reissued, with Engels making certain minor corrections to the translation. The second edition was also published in Leipzig by Genossenschaftsbuchdruckerei.

In 1891, on the 20th anniversary of the Paris Commune, Engels put together a new edition of the work. He wrote an introduction emphasising the historical significance of the experience of the Paris Commune, its theoretical generalization by Marx in "The Civil War in France" and providing additional information on the activities of the Communards from among the Blanquists and Proudhonists. Engels also included earlier material by Marx made for the International, providing additional historical background to the Commune from Marx's account of the Franco-Prussian War.

== Theoretical consequences ==
For Marx, the history of the Paris Commune caused him to reassess the significance of some of his own earlier writings. In a later preface to The Communist Manifesto (1848), Marx would write that "no special stress is laid on the revolutionary measures proposed at the end of Section II. That passage would, in many respects, be very differently worded today." It is the earlier passage that sought to show the process of worker seizure of state power.

Following the publication of "The Civil War in France", "One thing especially was proved by the Commune, viz., that 'the working class cannot simply lay hold of ready-made state machinery, and wield it for its own purposes.'" His writing of this passage also brings up a rift between Leninists and Social Democrats, who both interpret his writing differently. Libertarian Marxist currents would later draw from this work by emphasizing the ability of the working class to forge its own destiny without the need for a revolutionary party or state to mediate or aid its liberation.
