= Revolutsionnaya Rossiya =

Revolutsionnaya Rossiya (Russian: Революционная Россия (contemporary spelling: Революціонная Россія), lit. 'Revolutionary Russia)' was an illegal newspaper published by the League of Socialist-Revolutionaries in Imperial Russia from late 1900 (No. 1 dated 1900 actually appeared in January 1901). It was published in Geneva from January 1902 to December 1905 as an organ of the Socialist Revolutionary Party, before going defunct in 1905.
