= Ilya Rubanovich =

Russian-French revolutionary and trade unionist (1859-1920)

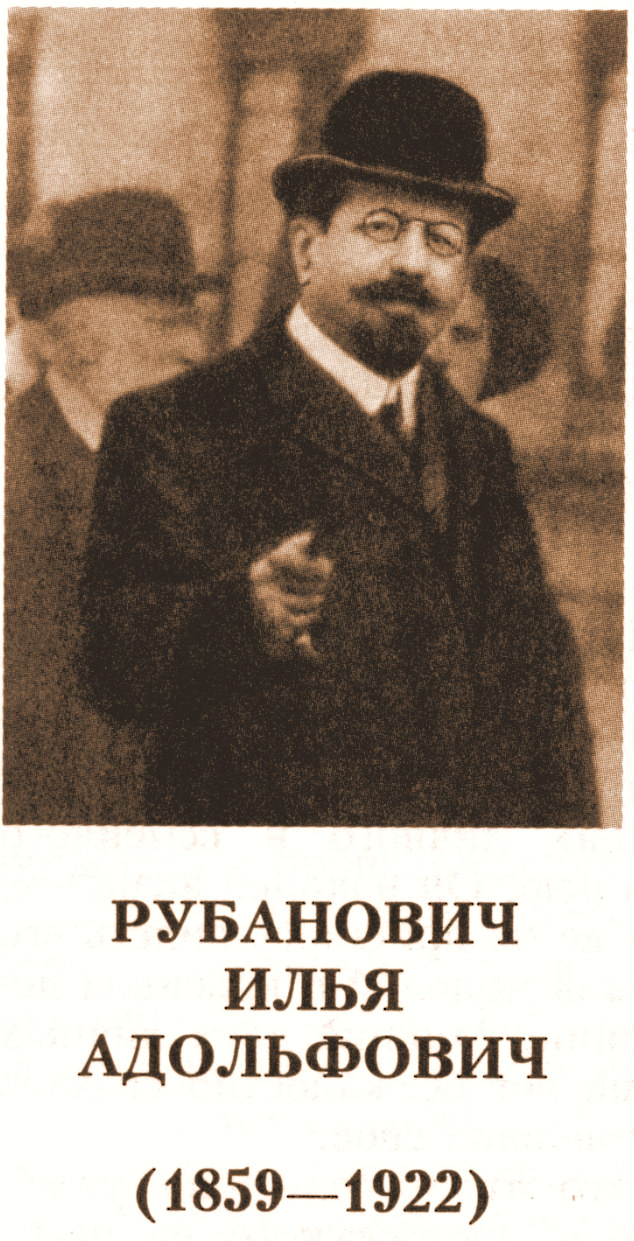
Ilya Rubanovich

Ilya Adolfovich Rubanovich (22 May 1859 – 16 October 1920) was a Russian revolutionary who joined 'The People's Will' ('Narodnaya Volya') in the 1880s. In 1881, this group assassinated Tsar Aleksandr II. During the repression which followed, Rubanovich fled abroad, eventually settling in Paris, France, and becoming a French citizen. There he co-founded the Group of 'Old Members of The People's Will' ('Gruppa Starykh Narodovol’tsev') in 1891, together with P.L. Lavrov, N.S. Rusanov and others. In 1900 he was instrumental in founding the Agrarian Socialist League.

When the Socialist Revolutionary Party (PSR) was founded in 1901, Rubanovich joined it and became its official representative abroad. Together with Nikolai Rusanov, he edited the party's official journal, Herald of the Russian Revolution (Vestnik Russkoi Revoliutsii). When the PSR was admitted to the Second International (over vehement protests from its rival, the Russian Social Democratic party), Rubanovich became the party's official representative to the International. In addition to his work for the PSR, Rubanovich was active in the French socialist movement. He was close to the Blanquist Parti Socialiste-Révolutionnaire (a namesake of the Russian PSR). In 1905, he supported the unification of the various French socialist groups in the French Socialist Party (SFIO). He also helped organise Jewish trade unionists in France.

In 1914, most European socialist parties split over the First World War. Rubanovich sided with the 'Defencist' wing of the Russian PSR and the 'social patriots' in the SFIO, who supported the Entente war effort. Rubanovich supported the February Revolution of 1917, briefly returned to Russia and then returned to Paris to resume his position as representative of the PSR abroad. He opposed the October Revolution.
