= Der Vorbote =

German publication

Vorbote was a German socialist publication, the monthly central organ of the German section of the First International. It was published in Geneva from 1866 to 1871.

Johann Philipp Becker, a democratic-socialist politician, was the editor of the magazine.

== Revival of Verbote in 1916 ==
The title was revived in January 1916 as a German language newspaper published in the Netherlands under the editorship of Anton Pannekoek. Originally Karl Radek had envisioned that he would that he would play a key role on an editorial board consisting of himself, Pannekoek, Henriette Roland Holst, Lenin, Trotsky, Franz Mehring, Julian Borchardt with the possibly inclusion of Robert Grimm, Clara Zetkin and Louis Fraina. Pannekoek set out the aim of the publication as to provide a theoretical basis for a new struggle against imperialism in the context of the First World War.
