= Soviet Union in World War II =

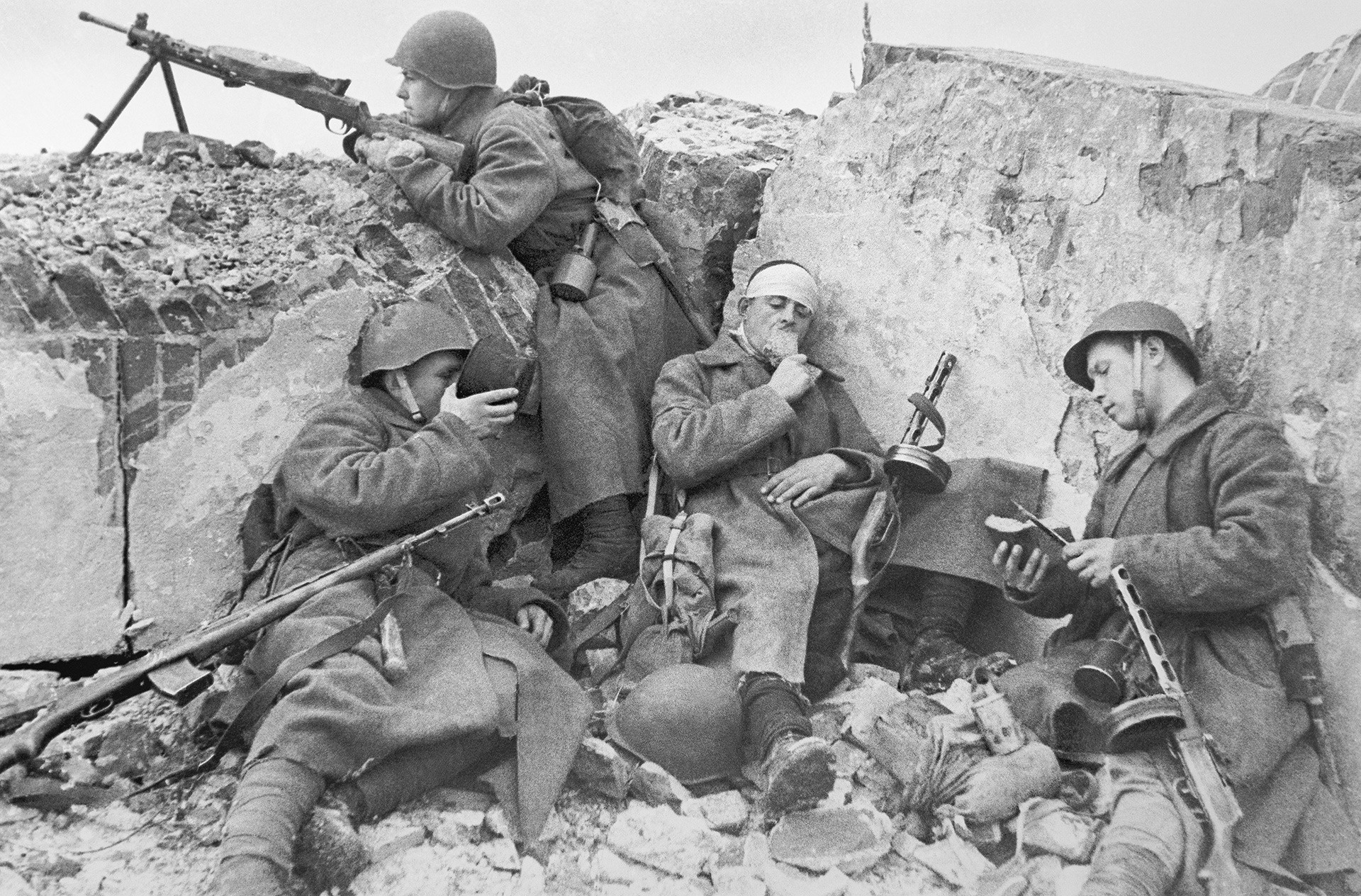
Soviet soldiers at Stalingrad during a short rest after fighting

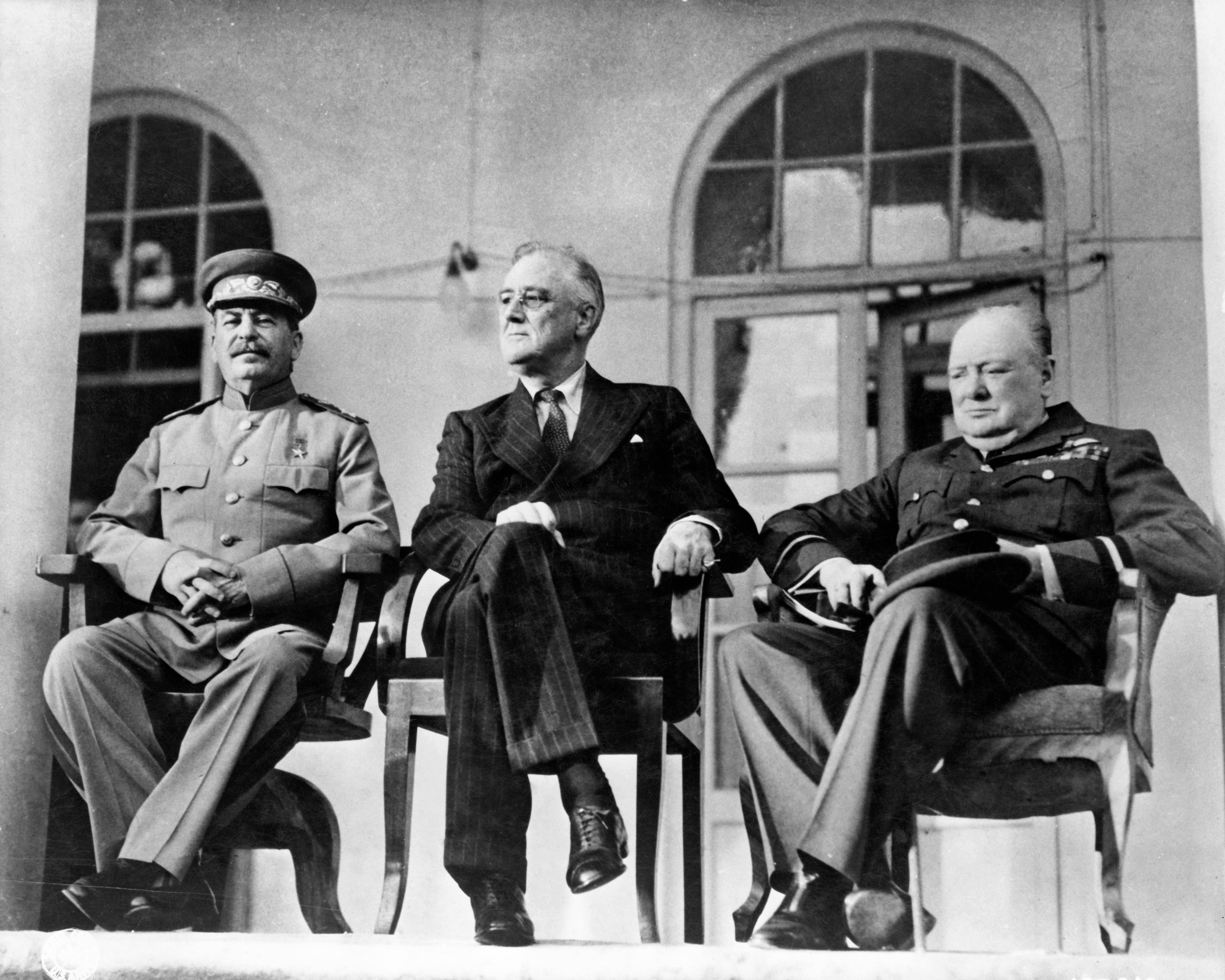
Left to right: Joseph Stalin, Franklin D. Roosevelt and Winston Churchill meeting at the Tehran Conference in 1943

After the Munich Agreement, the Soviet Union pursued a rapprochement with Nazi Germany. On 23 August 1939, the Soviet Union signed a non-aggression pact with Germany which included a secret protocol that divided Eastern Europe into German and Soviet spheres of influence, anticipating potential "territorial and political rearrangements" of these countries. Germany invaded Poland on 1 September 1939, starting World War II. The Soviets invaded eastern Poland on 17 September. Following the Winter War with Finland, the Soviets were ceded territories by Finland. This was followed by annexations of the Baltic states and parts of Romania.

On 22 June 1941, Adolf Hitler launched Operation Barbarossa, an invasion of the Soviet Union with the largest invasion force in history, resulting in large battles and horrific atrocities. This offensive comprised three army groups. The city of Leningrad was besieged while other major cities fell to the Germans. Despite initial successes, the German offensive ground to a halt in the Battle of Moscow, and the Soviets launched a counteroffensive, pushing the Germans back. The failure of Operation Barbarossa reversed the fortunes of Germany, and Stalin was confident that the Allied war machine would eventually defeat Germany. The Soviet Union repulsed Axis attacks, such as in the Battle of Stalingrad and the Battle of Kursk, which marked a turning point in the war. The Western Allies provided support to the Soviets in the form of Lend-Lease as well as air and naval support. Stalin met with Winston Churchill and Franklin D. Roosevelt at the Tehran Conference and discussed a two-front war against Germany and the future of Europe after the war. The Soviets launched successful offensives to regain territorial losses and began a push to Berlin. The Germans unconditionally surrendered in May 1945 after Berlin fell.

The bulk of Soviet fighting took place on the Eastern Front—including the Continuation War with Finland—but it also invaded Iran in August 1941 with the British. The Soviets later entered the war against Japan in August 1945, which began with an invasion of Manchuria. They had border conflicts with Japan up to 1939 before signing a non-aggression pact in 1941. Stalin had agreed with the Western Allies to enter the war against Japan at the Tehran Conference in 1943 and at the Yalta Conference in February 1945 once Germany was defeated. The entry of the Soviet Union in the war against Japan along with the atomic bombings by the United States led to Japan's surrender, marking the end of World War II. During the war, the Soviet Union, along with the United States, the United Kingdom and China, were considered the Big Four of Allied powers.

The Soviet Union suffered the greatest number of casualties in the war, losing more than 20 million citizens, about a third of all World War II casualties. The full demographic loss to the Soviet people was even greater. The German Generalplan Ost aimed to create more Lebensraum (lit. 'living space') for Germany through extermination. An estimated 3.5 million Soviet prisoners of war died in German captivity as a result of deliberate mistreatment and atrocities, and millions of civilians, including Soviet Jews, were killed in the Holocaust. However, at the cost of a large sacrifice, the Soviet Union emerged as a global superpower. The Soviets installed dependent communist governments in Eastern Europe, and tensions with the United States and the Western allies grew to what became known as the Cold War.

== Molotov–Ribbentrop Pact ==
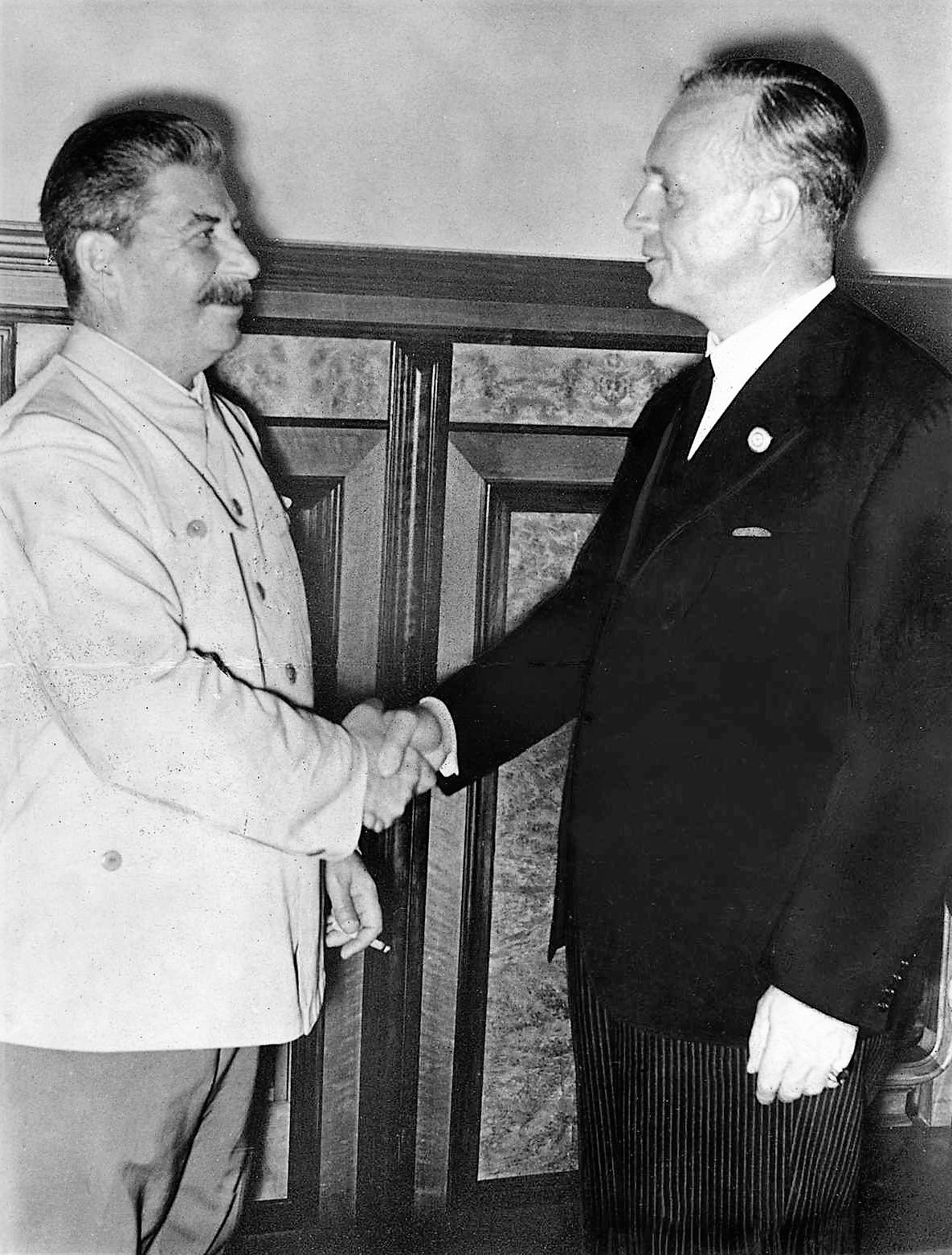
Stalin and Ribbentrop at the signing of the Molotov–Ribbentrop Pact on 23 August 1939.

During the 1930s, Soviet foreign minister Maxim Litvinov emerged as a leading voice for the official Soviet policy of collective security with the Western powers against Nazi Germany. In 1935, Litvinov negotiated treaties of mutual assistance with France and with Czechoslovakia with the aim of containing Hitler's expansion. After the Munich Agreement, which gave parts of Czechoslovakia to Nazi Germany, the Western democracies' policy of appeasement led the Soviet Union to reorient its foreign policy towards a rapprochement with Germany. On 3 May 1939, Stalin replaced Litvinov, who was closely identified with the anti-German position, with Vyacheslav Molotov.

In August 1939, Stalin accepted Hitler's proposal of a non-aggression pact with Germany, negotiated by foreign ministers Vyacheslav Molotov for the Soviets and Joachim von Ribbentrop for the Germans. Although officially a non-aggression treaty only, an appended secret protocol, also reached on 23 August, divided the whole of eastern Europe into German and Soviet spheres of influence. The USSR was promised the eastern part of Poland, then primarily populated by Ukrainians and Belarusians, in case of its dissolution, and Germany recognised Latvia, Estonia and Finland as parts of the Soviet sphere of influence, with Lithuania added in a second secret protocol in September 1939. Another clause of the treaty was that Bessarabia, then part of Romania, was to be joined to the Moldovan SSR, and become the Moldovan SSR under control of Moscow.

The pact was reached two days after the breakdown of Soviet military talks with British and French representatives in August 1939 over a potential Franco-Anglo-Soviet alliance. Political discussions had been suspended on 2 August, when Molotov stated that they could not be resumed until progress was made in military talks late in August, after the talks had stalled over guarantees for the Baltic states, while the military talks upon which Molotov insisted started on 11 August. At the same time, Germany, with whom the Soviets had started secret negotiations on 29 July argued that it could offer the Soviets better terms than Britain and France, with Ribbentrop insisting "there was no problem between the Baltic and the Black Sea that could not be solved between the two of us." German officials stated that, unlike Britain, Germany could permit the Soviets to continue their developments unmolested, and that "there is one common element in the ideology of Germany, Italy and the Soviet Union: opposition to the capitalist democracies of the West". By that time, Molotov had obtained information regarding Anglo-German negotiations and a pessimistic report from the Soviet ambassador in France.

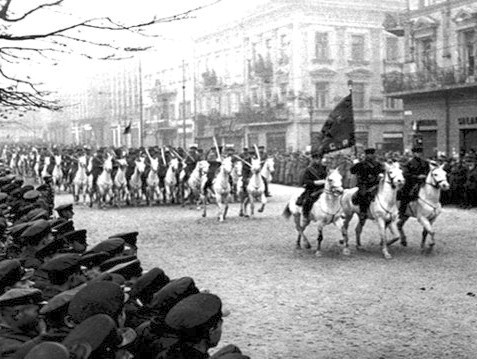
Soviet cavalry on parade in Lviv (then Lwów), after the city's surrender during the 1939 Soviet invasion of Poland

After disagreement regarding Stalin's demand to move Red Army troops through Poland and Romania (which Poland and Romania opposed), on 21 August, the Soviets proposed adjournment of military talks using the pretext that the absence of senior Soviet personnel at the talks interfered with the autumn manoeuvres of the Soviet forces, though the primary reason was the progress being made in the Soviet-German negotiations. That same day, Stalin received assurance that Germany would approve secret protocols to the proposed non-aggression pact that would grant the Soviets land in Poland, the Baltic states, Finland and Romania. Stalin telegrammed Hitler that night that the Soviets were willing to sign the pact and that he would receive Ribbentrop on 23 August. Regarding the larger issue of collective security, some historians believe that one reason that Stalin decided to abandon the doctrine was the shaping of his views of France and Britain by their entry into the Munich Agreement and the subsequent failure to prevent the German occupation of Czechoslovakia. Stalin may also have viewed the pact as a way of gaining time in an eventual war with Hitler in order to reinforce the Soviet military and shifting Soviet borders westwards, which would be militarily beneficial in such a war.

Stalin and Ribbentrop spent most of the night of the pact's signing trading friendly stories about world affairs and cracking jokes (a rarity for Ribbentrop) about Britain's weakness. The pair even joked about how the Anti-Comintern Pact principally scared "British shopkeepers." They further traded toasts, with Stalin proposing a toast to Hitler's health and Ribbentrop proposing a toast to Stalin.

== The division of Eastern Europe and other invasions ==
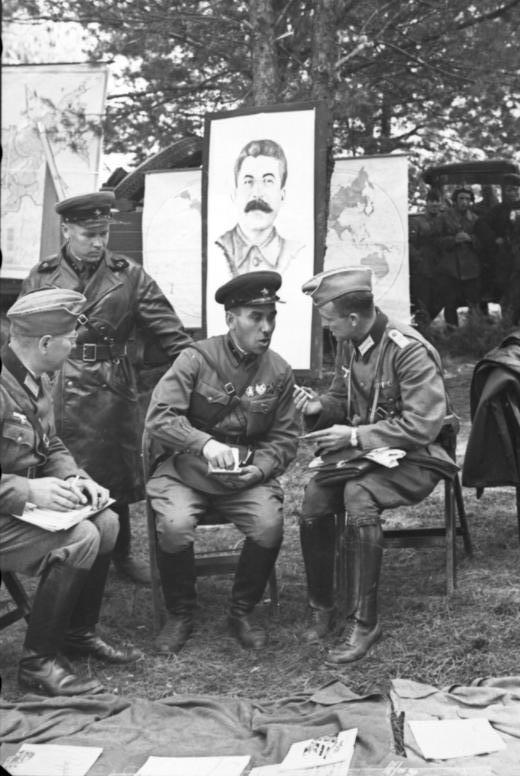
German and Soviet soldiers at the parade in Brest in front of a photo of Stalin

On 1 September 1939, the German invasion of its agreed upon portion of Poland started World War II. On 17 September, the Red Army invaded eastern Poland and occupied the Polish territory assigned to it by the Molotov–Ribbentrop Pact, followed by co-ordination with German forces in Poland. Eleven days later, the secret protocol of the Molotov–Ribbentrop Pact was modified, allotting Germany a larger part of Poland, while ceding most of Lithuania to the Soviet Union. The Soviet portions lay east of the so-called Curzon Line, an ethnographic frontier between Russia and Poland drawn up by a commission of the Paris Peace Conference in 1919.

Planned and actual territorial changes in Central and Eastern Europe 1939–1940 (click to enlarge)

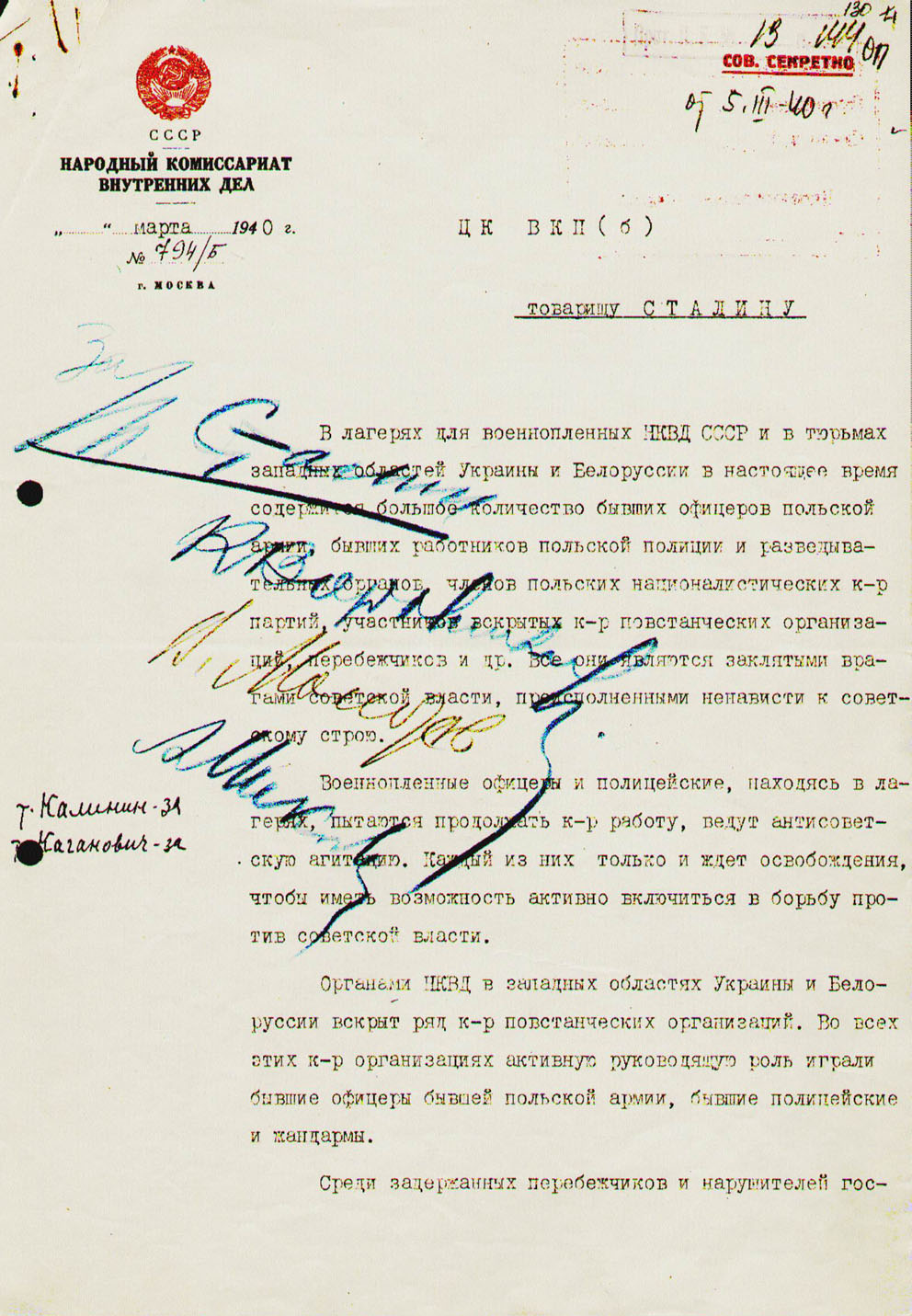
Part of the 5 March 1940 memo from Lavrentiy Beria to Stalin proposing execution of Polish officers

After taking around 300,000 Polish prisoners in 1939 and early 1940, NKVD officers conducted lengthy interrogations of the prisoners in camps that were, in effect, a selection process to determine who would be killed. On 5 March 1940, pursuant to a note to Stalin from Lavrenty Beria, the members of the Soviet Politburo (including Stalin) signed and 22,000 military and intellectuals were executed - They were labelled "nationalists and counterrevolutionaries", kept at camps and prisons in occupied western Ukraine and Belarus. This became known as the Katyn massacre. Major General Vasili M. Blokhin, chief executioner for the NKVD, personally shot 6,000 of the captured Polish officers in 28 consecutive nights, which remains one of the most organized and protracted mass murders by a single individual on record. During his 29-year career Blokhin shot an estimated 50,000 people, making him ostensibly the most prolific official executioner in recorded world history.

In August 1939, Stalin declared that he was going to "solve the Baltic problem", and thereafter, forced Lithuania, Latvia, and Estonia to sign treaties for "mutual assistance".

In November 1939, the Soviet Union invaded Finland. The Finnish defensive effort defied Soviet expectations, and after stiff losses, as well as the unsuccessful attempt to install a puppet government in Helsinki, Stalin settled for an interim peace granting the Soviet Union parts of Karelia and Salla (9% of Finnish territory). Soviet official casualty counts in the war exceeded 200,000, while Soviet Premier Nikita Khrushchev later claimed the casualties may have been one million. After this campaign, Stalin took actions to modify training and improve propaganda efforts in the Soviet military.

In mid-June 1940, when international attention was focused on the German invasion of France, Soviet NKVD troops raided border posts in the Baltic countries. Stalin claimed that the mutual assistance treaties had been violated, and gave six-hour ultimatums for new governments to be formed in each country, including lists of persons for cabinet posts provided by the Kremlin. Thereafter, state administrations were liquidated and replaced by Soviet cadres, followed by mass repression in which 34,250 Latvians, 75,000 Lithuanians and almost 60,000 Estonians were deported or killed. Elections for parliament and other offices were held with single candidates listed, the official results of which showed pro-Soviet candidates approval by 92.8 percent of the voters of Estonia, 97.6 percent of the voters in Latvia and 99.2 percent of the voters in Lithuania. The resulting peoples' assemblies immediately requested admission into the USSR, which was granted. In late June 1940, Stalin directed the Soviet annexation of Bessarabia and northern Bukovina, proclaiming this formerly Romanian territory part of the Moldavian SSR. But in annexing northern Bukovina, Stalin had gone beyond the agreed limits. The invasion of Bukovina violated the pact, as it went beyond the Soviet sphere of influence agreed with Germany.

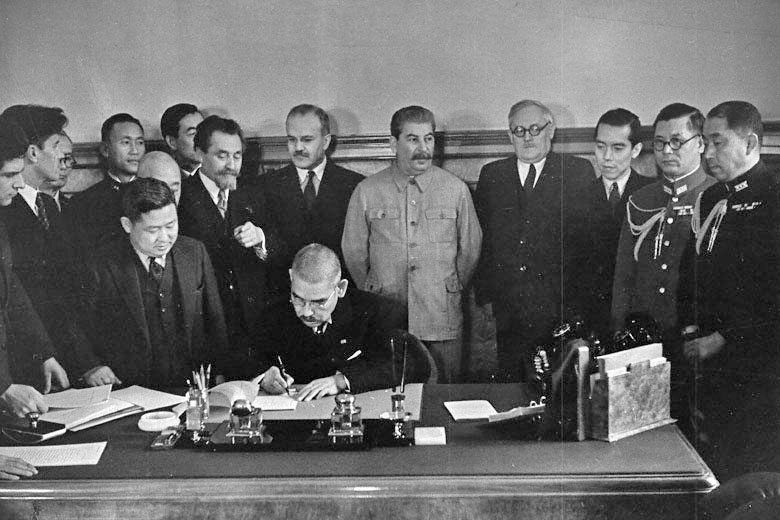
Stalin and Molotov on the signing of the Soviet–Japanese Neutrality Pact with the Empire of Japan, 1941

After the Tripartite Pact was signed by Axis powers Germany, Japan, and Italy, in October 1940, Stalin personally wrote to Ribbentrop about entering an agreement regarding a "permanent basis" for their "mutual interests." Stalin sent Molotov to Berlin to negotiate the terms for the Soviet Union to join the Axis and potentially enjoy the spoils of the pact. At Stalin's direction, Molotov insisted on Soviet interest in Turkey, Bulgaria, Romania, Hungary, Yugoslavia, and Greece, though Stalin had earlier unsuccessfully personally lobbied Turkish leaders to not sign a mutual assistance pact with Britain and France. Ribbentrop asked Molotov to sign another secret protocol with the statement: "The focal point of the territorial aspirations of the Soviet Union would presumably be centered south of the territory of the Soviet Union in the direction of the Indian Ocean." Molotov took the position that he could not take a "definite stand" on this without Stalin's agreement. Stalin did not agree with the suggested protocol, and negotiations broke down. In response to a later German proposal, Stalin stated that the Soviets would join the Axis if Germany foreclosed acting in the Soviet's sphere of influence. Shortly thereafter, Hitler issued a secret internal directive related to his plan to invade the Soviet Union.

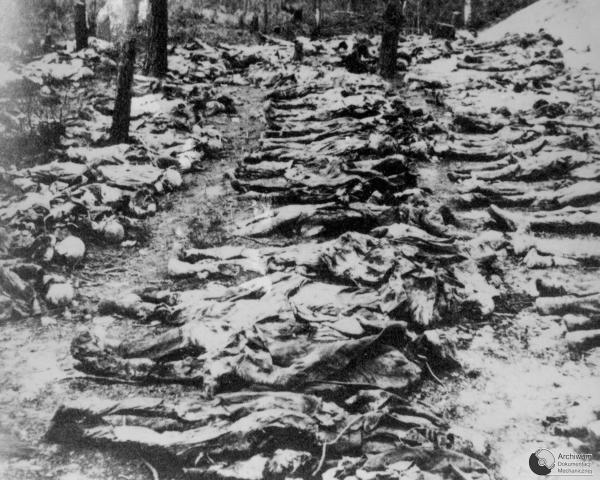
Photo from 1943 exhumation of mass grave of Polish officers killed by NKVD in the Katyn Forest in 1940

In an effort to demonstrate peaceful intentions toward Germany, on 13 April 1941, Stalin oversaw the signing of a neutrality pact with Japan. Since the Treaty of Portsmouth, Russia had been competing with Japan for spheres of influence in the Far East, where there was a power vacuum with the collapse of Imperial China. Although similar to the Molotov–Ribbentrop Pact with the Third Reich, that Soviet Union signed Soviet–Japanese Neutrality Pact with the Empire of Japan, to maintain the national interest of Soviet's sphere of influence in the European continent as well as the Far East conquest, whilst among the few countries in the world diplomatically recognizing Manchukuo, and allowed the rise of German invasion in Europe and Japanese aggression in Asia, but the Japanese defeat of Battles of Khalkhin Gol was the forceful factor to the temporary settlement before Soviet invasion of Manchuria in 1945 as the result of Yalta Conference. While Stalin had little faith in Japan's commitment to neutrality, he felt that the pact was important for its political symbolism, to reinforce a public affection for Germany, before military confrontation when Hitler controlled Western Europe and for Soviet Union to take control Eastern Europe. Stalin felt that there was a growing split in German circles about whether Germany should initiate a war with the Soviet Union, though Stalin was not aware of Hitler's further military ambition.

== Termination of the pact ==
During the early morning of 22 June 1941, Hitler terminated the pact by launching Operation Barbarossa, the Axis invasion of Soviet-held territories and the Soviet Union that began the war on the Eastern Front. Before the invasion, Stalin thought that Germany would not attack the Soviet Union until Germany had defeated Britain. At the same time, Soviet generals warned Stalin that Germany had concentrated forces on its borders. Two highly placed Soviet spies in Germany, "Starshina" and "Korsikanets", had sent dozens of reports to Moscow containing evidence of preparation for a German attack. Further warnings came from Richard Sorge, a Soviet spy in Tokyo working undercover as a German journalist who had penetrated deep into the German Embassy in Tokyo by seducing the wife of General Eugen Ott, the German ambassador to Japan.

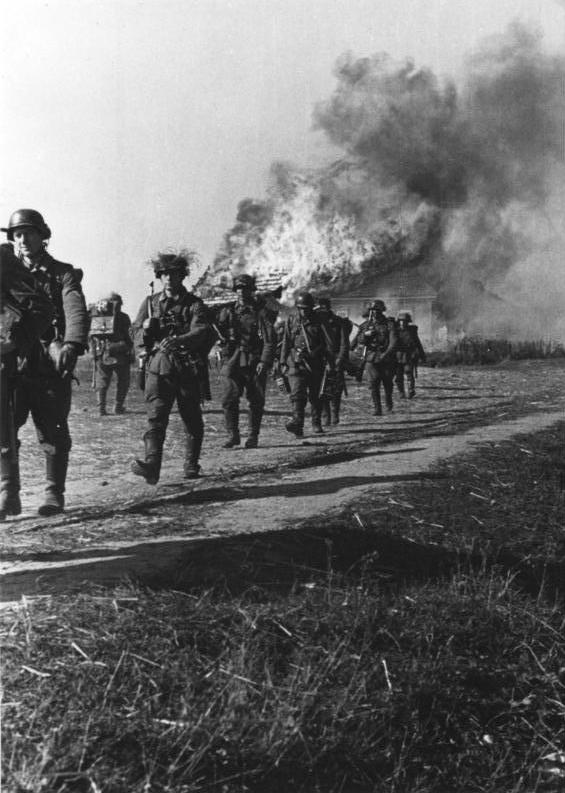
German soldiers march by a burning home in Ukraine, October 1941.

Seven days before the invasion, a Soviet spy in Berlin, part of the Rote Kapelle (Red Orchestra) spy network, warned Stalin that the movement of German divisions to the borders was to wage war on the Soviet Union. Five days before the attack, Stalin received a report from a spy in the German Air Ministry that "all preparations by Germany for an armed attack on the Soviet Union have been completed, and the blow can be expected at any time." In the margin, Stalin wrote to the people's commissar for state security, "you can send your 'source' from the headquarters of German aviation to his mother. This is not a 'source' but a dezinformator." Although Stalin increased Soviet western border forces to 2.7 million men and ordered them to expect a possible German invasion, he did not order a full-scale mobilisation of forces to prepare for an attack. Stalin felt that a mobilization might provoke Hitler to prematurely begin to wage war against the Soviet Union, which Stalin wanted to delay until 1942 in order to strengthen Soviet forces.

In the initial hours after the German attack began, Stalin hesitated, wanting to ensure that the German attack was sanctioned by Hitler, rather than the unauthorized action of a rogue general. Accounts by Nikita Khrushchev and Anastas Mikoyan claim that, after the invasion, Stalin retreated to his dacha in despair for several days and did not participate in leadership decisions. But, some documentary evidence of orders given by Stalin contradicts these accounts, leading historians such as Roberts to speculate that Khrushchev's account is inaccurate.

Stalin soon quickly made himself a Marshal of the Soviet Union, then country's highest military rank and Supreme Commander in Chief of the Soviet Armed Forces aside from being Premier and General-Secretary of the ruling Communist Party of the Soviet Union that made him the leader of the nation, as well as the People's Commissar for Defence, which is equivalent to the U.S. Secretary of War at that time and the U.K. Minister of Defence and formed the State Defense Committee to coordinate military operations with himself also as chairman. He chaired the Stavka, the highest defense organisation of the country. Meanwhile, Marshal Georgy Zhukov was named to be the Deputy Supreme Commander in Chief of the Soviet Armed Forces.

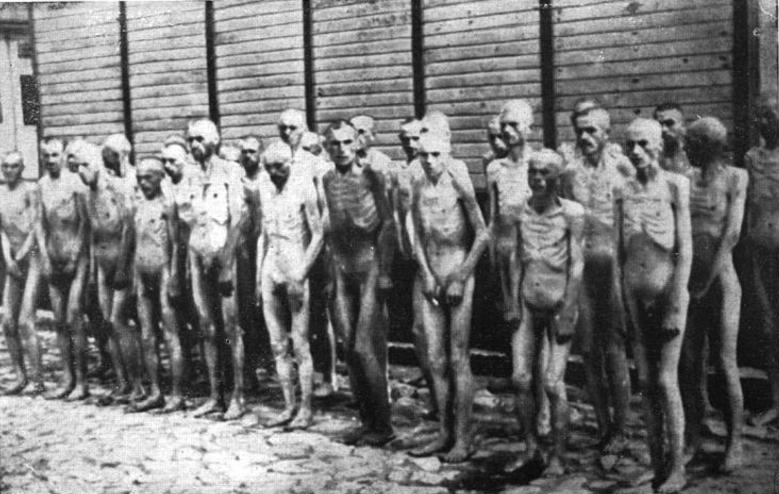
Soviet prisoners of war starving in the Nazi Mauthausen concentration camp.

In the first three weeks of the invasion, as the Soviet Union tried to defend itself against large German advances, it suffered 750,000 casualties, and lost 10,000 tanks and 4,000 aircraft. In July 1941, Stalin completely reorganized the Soviet military, placing himself directly in charge of several military organizations. This gave him complete control of his country's entire war effort; more control than any other leader in World War II.

A pattern soon emerged where Stalin embraced the Red Army's strategy of conducting multiple offensives, while the Germans overran each of the resulting small, newly gained grounds, dealing the Soviets severe casualties. The most notable example of this was the Battle of Kiev, where over 600,000 Soviet troops were quickly killed, captured or missing.

By the end of 1941, the Soviet military had suffered 4.3 million casualties and the Germans had captured 3.0 million Soviet prisoners, 2.0 million of whom died in German captivity by February 1942. German forces had advanced c. 1,700 kilometres, and maintained a linearly-measured front of 3,000 kilometres. The Red Army put up fierce resistance during the war's early stages. Even so, according to Glantz, they were plagued by an ineffective defence doctrine against well-trained and experienced German forces, despite possessing some modern Soviet equipment, such as the KV-1 and T-34 tanks.

== Soviets stop the Germans ==
While the Germans made huge advances in 1941, killing millions of Soviet soldiers, at Stalin's direction the Red Army directed sizable resources to prevent the Germans from achieving one of their key strategic goals, the attempted capture of Leningrad. They held the city at the cost of more than a million Soviet soldiers in the region and more than a million civilians, many of whom died from starvation.

While the Germans pressed forward, Stalin was confident of an eventual Allied victory over Germany. In September 1941, Stalin told British diplomats that he wanted two agreements: (1) a mutual assistance/aid pact and (2) a recognition that, after the war, the Soviet Union would gain the territories in countries that it had taken pursuant to its division of Eastern Europe with Hitler in the Molotov–Ribbentrop Pact. The British agreed to assistance but refused to agree to the territorial gains, which Stalin accepted months later as the military situation had deteriorated somewhat by mid-1942. On 6 November 1941, Stalin rallied his generals in a speech given underground in Moscow, telling them that the German blitzkrieg would fail because of weaknesses in the German rear in Nazi-occupied Europe and the underestimation of the strength of the Red Army, and that the German war effort would crumble against the Anglo-American-Soviet "war engine".

Correctly calculating that Hitler would direct efforts to capture Moscow, Stalin concentrated his forces to defend the city, including numerous divisions transferred from Soviet eastern sectors after he determined that Japan would not attempt an attack in those areas. By December, Hitler's troops had advanced to within 25 kilometres (16 mi) of the Kremlin in Moscow. On 5 December, the Soviets launched a counteroffensive, pushing German troops back c. 80 kilometres (50 mi) from Moscow in what was the first major defeat of the Wehrmacht in the war.

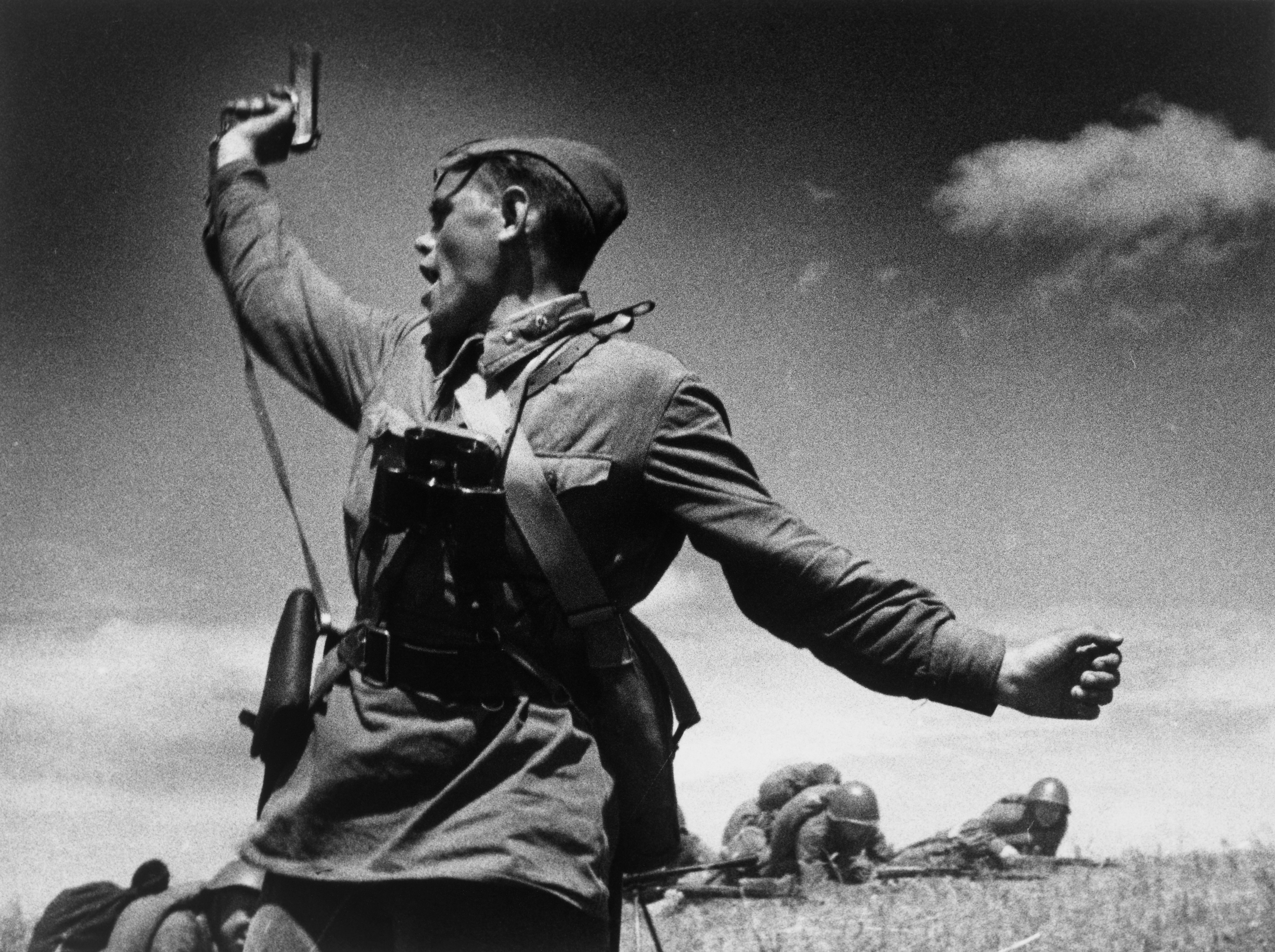
Iconic photo of a Soviet officer (thought to be Ukrainian Alexei Yeryomenko) leading his soldiers into battle against the invading German army, 12 July 1942, in Soviet Ukraine

In early 1942, the Soviets began a series of offensives labelled "Stalin's First Strategic Offensives". The counteroffensive bogged down, in part due to mud from rain in the spring of 1942. Stalin's attempt to retake Kharkov in Ukraine ended in the disastrous encirclement of Soviet forces, with over 200,000 Soviet casualties suffered. Stalin attacked the competence of the generals involved. General Georgy Zhukov and others subsequently revealed that some of those generals had wished to remain in a defensive posture in the region, but Stalin and others had pushed for the offensive. Some historians have doubted Zhukov's account.

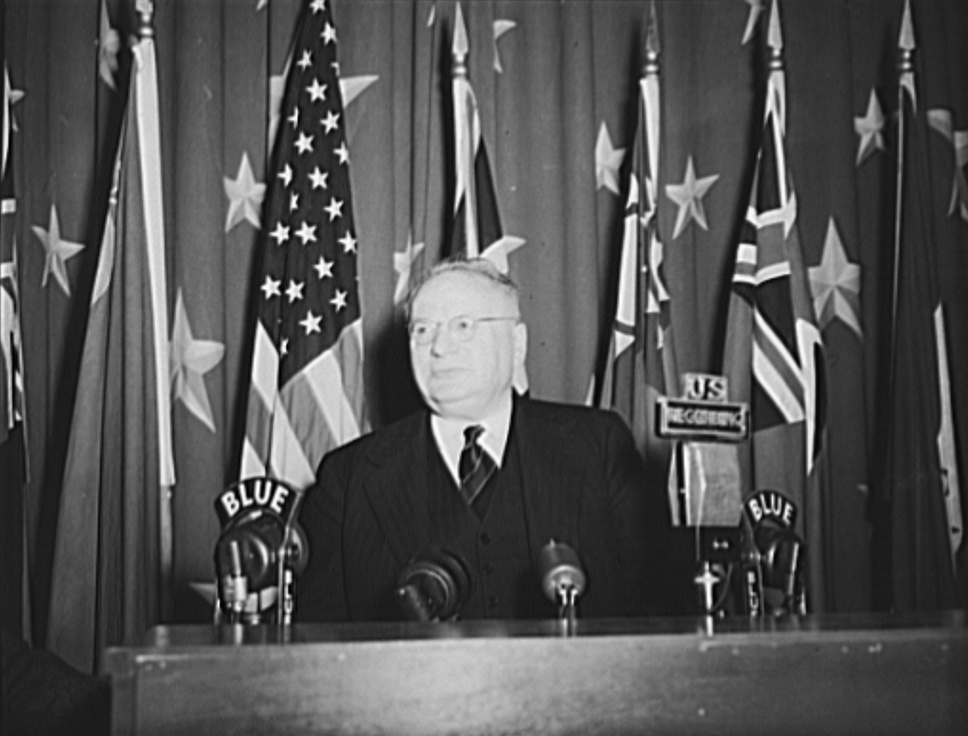
Maxim Litvinov, the Soviet ambassador to the United States

At the same time, Hitler was worried about American popular support after the US entry into the war following the Attack on Pearl Harbor, and a potential Anglo-American invasion on the Western Front in 1942 (which did not occur until the summer of 1944). He changed his primary goal from an immediate victory in the East, to the more long-term goal of securing the southern Soviet Union to protect oil fields vital to the long-term German war effort. While Red Army generals correctly judged the evidence that Hitler would shift his efforts south, Stalin thought it a flanking move in the German attempt to take Moscow.

The German southern campaign began with a push to capture the Crimea, which ended in disaster for the Red Army. Stalin publicly criticised his generals' leadership. In their southern campaigns, the Germans took 625,000 Red Army prisoners in July and August 1942 alone. At the same time, in a meeting in Moscow, Churchill privately told Stalin that the British and Americans were not yet prepared to make an amphibious landing against a fortified Nazi-held French coast in 1942, and would direct their efforts to invading German-held North Africa. He pledged a campaign of massive strategic bombing, to include German civilian targets.

Estimating that the Russians were "finished," the Germans began another southern operation in the autumn of 1942, the Battle of Stalingrad. Hitler insisted upon splitting German southern forces in a simultaneous siege of Stalingrad and an offensive against Baku on the Caspian Sea. Stalin directed his generals to spare no effort to defend Stalingrad. Although the Soviets suffered in excess of more than 2 million casualties at Stalingrad, their victory over German forces, including the encirclement of 290,000 Axis troops, marked a turning point in the war.

Within a year after Barbarossa, Stalin reopened the churches in the Soviet Union. He may have wanted to motivate the majority of the population who had Christian beliefs. By changing the official policy of the party and the state towards religion, he could engage the Church and its clergy in mobilising the war effort. On 4 September 1943, Stalin invited the metropolitans Sergius, Alexy, and Nikolay to the Kremlin. He proposed to reestablish the Moscow Patriarchate, which had been suspended since 1925, and elect the Patriarch. On 8 September 1943, Metropolitan Sergius was elected Patriarch. One account said that Stalin's reversal followed a sign that he supposedly received from heaven.

== The Frontoviki ==
Over 75% of Red Army divisions were listed as "rifle divisions" (as infantry divisions were known in the Red Army). In the Imperial Russian Army, the strelkovye (rifle) divisions were considered more prestigious than pekhotnye (infantry) divisions, and in the Red Army, all infantry divisions were labeled strelkovye divisions. The Soviet rifleman was known as a peshkom ("on foot") or more frequently as a frontovik (Russian: фронтовик—front fighter; plural Russian: фронтовики—frontoviki). The term frontovik was not equivalent to the German term Landser, the American G.I Joe nor the British Tommy Atkins, all of which referred to soldiers in general, as the term frontovik applied only to those infantrymen who fought at the front. All able-bodied males in the Soviet Union became eligible for conscription at the age of 19—those attending a university or a technical school were able to escape conscription, and even then could defer military service for a period ranging from 3 months to a year. Deferments could be only offered three times. The Soviet Union comprised 20 military districts, which corresponded with the borders of the oblasts, and were further divided into raions (counties). The raions had assigned quotas specifying the number of men they had to produce for the Red Army every year. The vast majority of the frontoviks had been born in the 1920s and had grown up knowing nothing other than the Soviet system. Every year, men received draft notices in the mail informing to report at a collection point, usually a local school, and customarily reported to duty with a bag or suitcase carrying some spare clothes, underwear, and tobacco. The conscripts then boarded a train to a military reception center where they were issued uniforms, underwent a physical test, had their heads shaven and were given a steam bath to rid them of lice. A typical soldier was given ammo pouches, shelter-cape, ration bag, cooking pot, water bottle and an identity tube containing papers listing pertinent personal information.

During training, conscripts woke up between 5 and 6 a.m.; training lasted for 10 to 12 hours—six days of the week. Much of the training was done by rote and consisted of instruction. Before 1941 training had lasted for six months, but after the war, training was shorted to a few weeks. After finishing training, all men had to take the Oath of the Red Army which read:

I______, a citizen of the Union of the Soviet Socialist Republics, entering into the ranks of the Red Army of the Workers and Peasants', take this oath and solemnly promise to be an honest, brave, disciplined, vigilant fighter, staunchly to protect military and state secrets, and unquestioningly to obey all military regulations and orders of commanders and superiors.

I promise conscientiously to study military affairs, in every way to protect state secrets and state property, and to my last breath to be faithful to the people, the Soviet Motherland, and the Workers-Peasants' Government. I am always prepared on order of the Workers and Peasants Government to rise to the defense of my Motherland, the Union of Soviet Socialist Republics; and as a fighting man of the Red Army of Workers and Peasants', I promise to defend it bravely, skillfully, with dignity and honor, sparing neither my blood nor my life itself for the achievement of total victory over our enemies.

If by evil intent I should violate this, my solemn oath, then let the severe punishment of Soviet law and the total hatred and contempt of the working classes befall me.

Tactics were based on the 1936 training manual and on the revised edition of 1942. Small-unit movements and how to build defensive positions were laid out in a manner that was easy to understand and memorize. The manuals had the force of law and violations of the manuals counted as legal offenses. Soviet tactics always had the platoons attacking in the same way—with the platoons usually broken into four sections occupying about 100 yards (91 m) on average. The only complex formation was the diamond formation—with one section advancing, two behind and one in the rear. Unlike the Wehrmacht, the Red Army did not engage in leap-frogging of sections with one section providing fire support to the sections that were advancing: instead all of the sections and platoons attacked en masse. The other only variation was for the sections to "seep" into a position by infiltration.

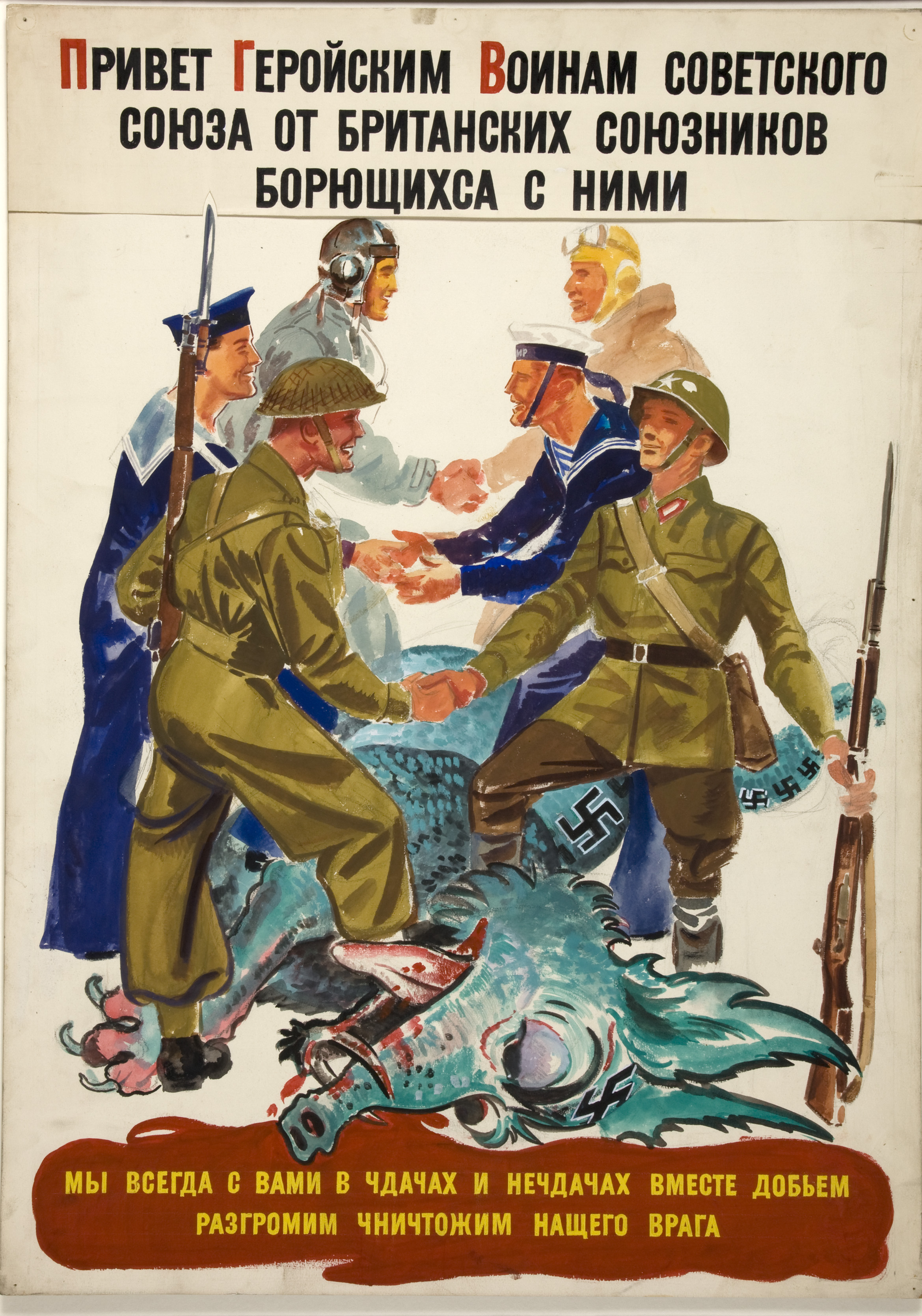
British and Soviet servicemen over body of swastikaed dragon

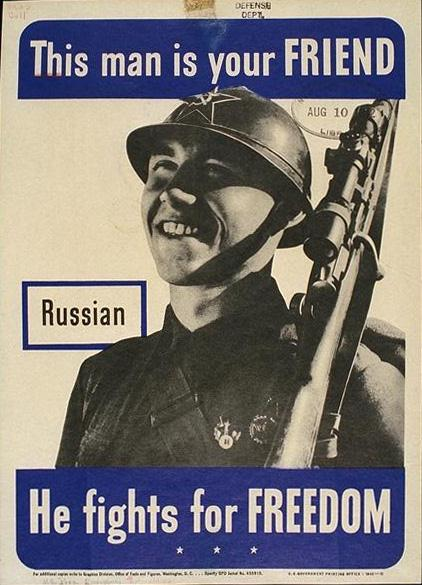
US government poster showing a friendly Red Army soldier, 1942

When the order Na shturm, marshch! (Assault, march!) was given, the Soviet infantry would charge the enemy while shouting the traditional Russian battle cry Urra! (Russian: ура !, pronounced oo-rah), the sound of which many German veterans found terrifying. During the charge, the riflemen would fire with rifles and submachine guns while throwing grenades before closing in for blizhnii boi (Russian: ближний бой—close combat—close-quarter fighting with guns, bayonets, rifle butts, knives, digging tools and fists), a type of fighting at which the Red Army excelled. On the defensive, the frontoviki had a reputation for their skill at camouflaging their positions and for their discipline in withholding fire until Axis forces came within close range. Before 1941 Red Army doctrine had called for opening fire at maximum range, but experience quickly taught the advantages of ambushing the enemy with surprise fire at close ranges from multiple positions.

The typical frontovik during the war was an ethnic Russian aged 19–24 with an average height of 5 feet 6 inches (1.68 m). Most of the men were shaven bald to prevent lice and the few who did grow their hair kept it very short. The American historian Gordon Rottman describes the uniforms as "simple and functional". In combat, the men wore olive-brown helmets or the pilotka (side cap). Officers wore a shlem (helmet) or a furazhka (Russian: фуражка—peaked cap), a round service-hat with a black visor and a red star. Rottman described Soviet weapons as "...known for their simplicity, ruggedness and general reliability". The standard rifle, a Mosin-Nagant 7.62 mm M 1891/30, although heavy, was an effective weapon that crucially was not affected by the cold. Every rifle section had one or two 7.62 mm Degtyaryov DP light machine guns to provide fire support. By 1944, one of every four frontoviki was armed with the 7.62 mm PPSh-41 (Pistolet-pulemet Shapagina-Pistol Automatic Shpagin), a type of submachine gun known as a "rugged and reliable weapon", if somewhat underpowered.

The frontovik usually carried all he had in a simple bag. Most of the frontoviki had a perevyazochny paket (wound dressing packet), a razor, a shovel and would be very lucky to have a towel and toothbrush. Toothpaste, shampoo and soap were extremely rare. Usually sticks with chewed ends were used for brushing teeth. Latrine pits were dug, as portable toilets were rare in the Red Army. Soldiers frequently slept outdoors, even during the winter. Food was usually abysmal and often in short supply, especially in 1941 and 1942. The frontoviki detested the rear-service troops who did not face the dangers of combat as krysy (Russian: крысы—rats; singular: Russian: крыса, romanized: krysa). The frontovik lived on a diet of black rye bread; canned meats like fish and tushonka (stewed pork); shchi (cabbage soup) and kasha (porridge).". Kasha and shchi were so common that a popular slogan in the Red Army was "shchi da kasha, pisha nasha" ("schchi and kasha, that's our fare"). Chai (Russian: чай—hot sugared tea) was an extremely popular beverage, along with beer and vodka. Makhorka, a type of cheap tobacco rolled into handmade cigarettes, was the standard for smoking.

Rottmann describes medical care as "marginal". A shortage of doctors, medical equipment and drugs meant those wounded often died, usually in immense pain. Morphine was unknown in the Red Army. Most Red Army soldiers had not received preventive inoculations, and diseases became major problems—with malaria, pneumonia, diphtheria, tuberculosis, typhus, dysentery, and meningitis in particular regularly sickening Red-Army men. In the winter frostbite often sent soldiers to the medical system, while in the spring and fall rains made trench foot a common ailment. The frontoviki had a pay day once every month, but often did not receive their wages. All soldiers were exempt from taxes. In 1943 a private was paid 600 roubles per month, a corporal 1,000 roubles, a junior sergeant 2,000 roubles and a sergeant 3,000 roubles. Special pay accrued to those serving in guards units, tanks, and anti-tank units, to paratroopers and to those decorated for bravery in combat. Those units that greatly distinguished themselves in combat had the prefix "Guards" (Russian: Гвардии, romanized: Gvardii, lit. 'of the Guard') prefixed to their unit title, a title of great respect and honor that brought better pay and rations. In the Imperial Russian Army, the elite had always been the Imperial Guards regiments, and the title "Guards" when applied to a military unit in Russia still has elitist connotations.

Discipline was harsh and men could be executed, for desertion and ordering a retreat without orders. To maintain morale, the men were often entertained with films shown on outdoor screens, together with musical troupes performing music, singing and dancing. The balalaika—regarded as a Russian "national instrument"—often featured as part of the entertainment. The Soviet regime held the position that essentially sex did not exist, and no official publications made any references to matters sexual. After the Germans hanged the 18-year old partisan heroine Zoya Kosmodemyanskaya (29 November 1941), the photo of her corpse caused a sensation when published in early 1942 as she was topless, which ensured that the photo attracted much prurient interest. Unlike the German and French armies, the Red Army had no system of field brothels and the frontoviki were not issued condoms as men in the British and American armies were. Venereal diseases were a major problem and those soldiers afflicted were harshly punished if discovered. The widespread rapes committed by the Red Army when entering Germany had little to do with sexual desire, but were instead acts of power, in the words of Rottman "the basest form of revenge and humiliation the soldiers could inflict on the Germans". It was a common practice for officers to take "campaign wives" or PPZh (Russian: походно-полевые жены (ППЖ), romanized: pokhodno-polevy zheny, lit. 'field marching wives'). Women serving in the Red Army Sometimes were told that they were now the mistresses of the officers, regardless of what they felt about the matter. The "campaign wives" were often nurses, signalers and clerks who wore a black beret. Despite being forced to become the concubines of the officers, they were widely hated by the frontoviki, who saw the "campaign wives" as trading sex for more favorable positions. The writer Vasily Grossman recorded typical remarks about the "campaign wives" in 1942: "Where's the general?" [someone asks]. "Sleeping with his whore." And these girls had once wanted to be 'Tanya', or Zoya Kosmodemyanskaya.

The frontoviki had to live, fight and die in small circular foxholes dug into the earth with enough room for one or two men. Slit trenches connected what the Germans called "Russian holes". The soldiers were usually not issued blankets or sleeping bags, even in the winter. Instead, the frontoviki slept in their coats and shelter-capes, usually on pine, evergreen needles, fir boughs, piled leaves or straw. In the winter, the temperature could drop as low as -60 °F (-50 °C), making General Moroz (General Frost) as much an enemy as the Germans. Spring started in April and with it came rains and snowmelt, turning the battlefields into a muddy quagmire. Summers were dusty and hot while with the fall came the rasputitsa (time without roads) as heavy autumn rains once again turned the battlefields into muddy quagmires that made the spring rains look tame by comparison.

The Soviet Union encompassed over 150 different languages and dialects but Russians comprised the majority of the Red Army and Russian was the language of command. The Red Army had very few ethnic units, as the policy was one of sliianie (Russian: слияние, lit. 'blending') in which men from the non-Russian groups were assigned to units with Russian majorities. The few exceptions to this rule included the Cossack units and the troops from the Baltic states of Estonia, Latvia and Lithuania, who however were few in number. The experience of combat tended to bind the men together regardless of their language or ethnicity, with one Soviet veteran recalling: "We were all bleeding the same blood.". Despite a history of anti-Semitism in Russia, Jewish veterans serving in the frontovik units described anti-Semitism as rare, instead recalling a sense of belonging. During the first six months of Operation Barbarossa, the Wehrmacht and the SS had a policy of shooting all of the commissars. Jews serving in the Red Army who were taken prisoner by German forces also received short shrift. During the war, the Soviet authorities toned down pro-atheist propaganda, and Eastern Orthodox priests blessed units going into battle, though chaplains were not allowed. Muslims from Central Asia, the Caucasus, the Volga and the Crimea were allowed to practice their religion discreetly, though—as with Eastern Orthodox—no chaplains were allowed. Most soldiers carried lucky talismans. Despite official Soviet atheism, many soldiers wore crosses around their necks and crossed themselves in the traditional Eastern Orthodox manner before going into battle, though the British historian Catherine Merridale interprets these actions as more "totemic" gestures meant to ensure good luck rather than expressions of "real" faith. One of the most popular talismans was the poem Wait for Me by Konstantin Simonov, which he wrote in October 1941 for his fiancée Valentina Serova. The popularity of Wait for Me was such that almost all ethnic Russians in the Red Army knew the poem by heart, and carried a copy of the poem—together with photographs of their girlfriends or wives back home—to reflect their desire to return to their loved ones.

"Political work" done by politruks and kommissars took much of the soldiers' spare time, as at least one hour every day was given to political indoctrination into Communism for soldiers not engaged in combat. The term Nazi was never used to describe the enemy, as the term was an acronym for National-Sozialistische Deutsche Arbeiterpartei (National Socialist German Workers' Party) and the politruks and kommissars found explaining why the enemy called themselves "National Socialists" to be too confusing for the frontoviki. The preferred terms for the enemy were "fascists", Gitlertsy (Hitlerites), Germanskie and nemetskiye (Russian: немецкие—a Russian term for Germans). The commissars had the duty of monitoring Red Army officers for any sign of disloyalty, and maintained a network of informers known as seksots (Russian: сексоты—secret collaborators) within the ranks. In October 1942 the system of dual command, which dated back to the Russian Civil War, and in which the officers shared authority with the commissars, was abolished—thenceforward only officers had the power of command. Many commissars after the Stalin's Decree 307 of 9 October 1942 were shocked to find how much the officers and men hated them. The commissars now become the politruks or deputy commanders for political affairs. The politruks no longer had the power of command, but still evaluated both officers and men for their political loyalty, carried out political indoctrination and had the power to order summary executions of anyone suspected of cowardice or treason. Such executions were known as devyat gram (nine grams—a reference to the weight of a bullet), pustit v rakhod (to expend someone) or vyshka (a shortened form of vysshaya mera nakazanija—extreme penalty). Despite these fearsome powers, many of the frontoviki were often openly contemptuous of the politruks if subjected to excessively long boring lectures on the finer points of Marxism–Leninism, and officers tended to win conflicts with the poltitruks as military merit started to count more in the Great Patriotic War than did political zeal. Relations between the officers and men were usually good, with junior officers in particular being seen as soratniki (comrades in arms) as they lived under the same conditions and faced the same dangers as the frontoviki. Officers usually had only a high-school education—very few had gone to university—and coming from the same social milieu as their men ensured that they could relate to them. The frontoviki usually addressed their company commanders as Batya (father).

== Soviet push to Germany ==
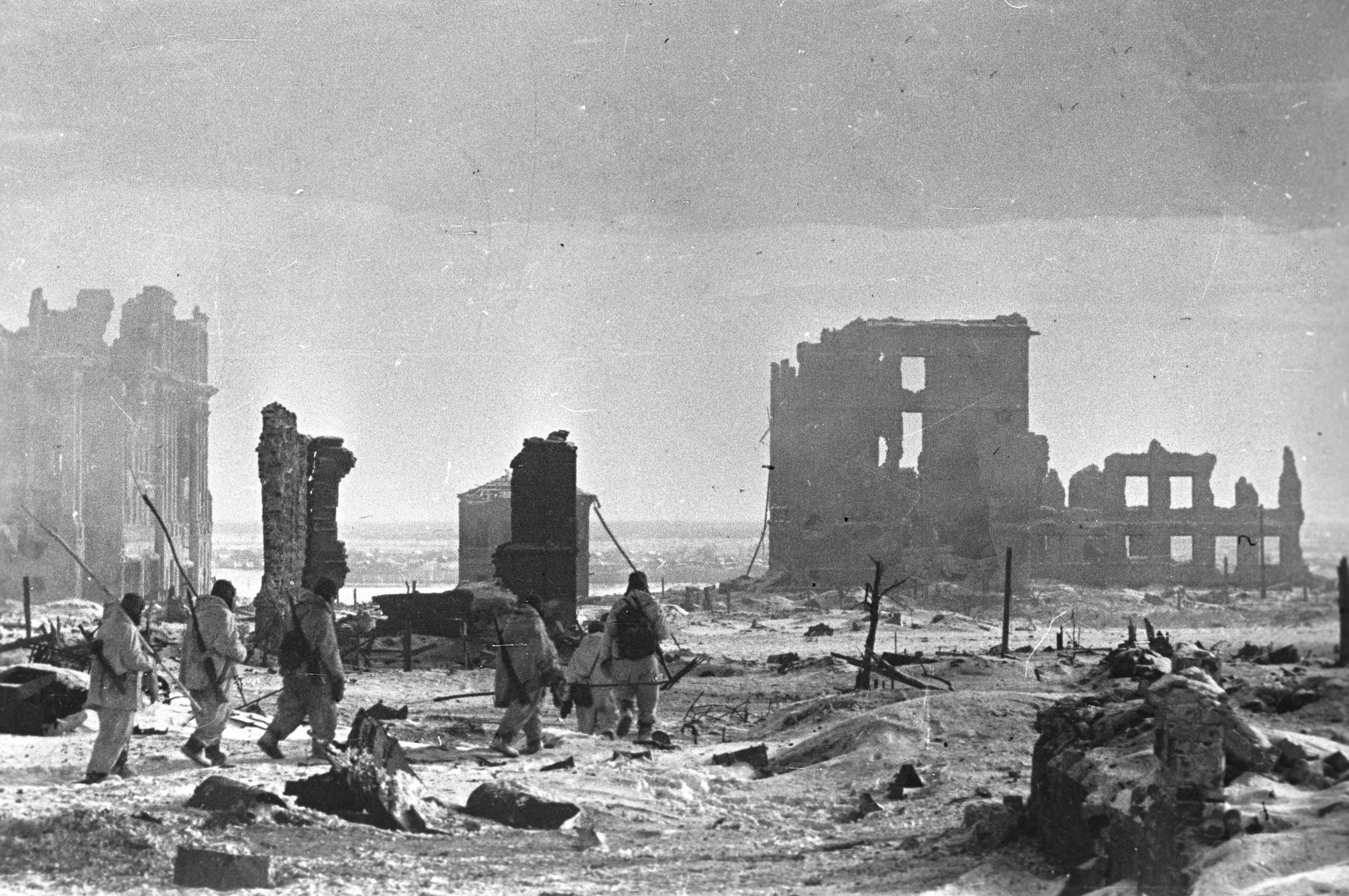
The center of Stalingrad after liberation in 1943

The Soviets repulsed the important German strategic southern campaign and, although 2.5 million Soviet casualties were suffered in that effort, it permitted the Soviets to take the offensive for most of the rest of the war on the Eastern Front. Stalin personally told a Polish general requesting information about missing Polish officers that all of the Poles were freed, and that not all could be accounted because the Soviets "lost track" of them in Manchuria. After Polish railroad workers found the mass grave, the Nazis used the massacre to attempt to drive a wedge between Stalin and the other Allies, including bringing in a European commission of investigators from twelve countries to examine the graves. In 1943, as the Soviets prepared to retake Poland, Nazi Propaganda Minister Joseph Goebbels correctly guessed that Stalin would attempt to falsely claim that the Germans massacred the victims. As Goebbels predicted, the Soviets had a "commission" investigate the matter, falsely concluding that the Germans had killed the PoWs. The Soviets did not admit responsibility until 1990.

In 1943, Stalin ceded to his generals' call for the Soviet Union to take a defensive stance because of disappointing losses after Stalingrad, a lack of reserves for offensive measures and a prediction that the Germans would likely next attack a bulge in the Soviet front at Kursk such that defensive preparations there would more efficiently use resources. The Germans did attempt an encirclement attack at Kursk, which was successfully repulsed by the Soviets after Hitler cancelled the offensive, in part, because of the Allied invasion of Sicily, though the Soviets suffered over 800,000 casualties. Kursk also marked the beginning of a period where Stalin became more willing to listen to the advice of his generals.

By the end of 1943, the Soviets occupied half of the territory taken by the Germans from 1941 to 1942. Soviet military industrial output also had increased substantially from late 1941 to early 1943 after Stalin had moved factories well to the East of the front, safe from German invasion and air attack. The strategy paid off, as such industrial increases were able to occur even while the Germans in late 1942 occupied more than half of European Russia, including 40 percent (80 million) of its population, and approximately 2,500,000 square kilometres (970,000 sq mi) of Soviet territory. The Soviets had also prepared for war for more than a decade, including preparing 14 million civilians with some military training. Accordingly, while almost all of the original 5 million men of the Soviet army had been wiped out by the end of 1941, the Soviet military had swelled to 8 million members by the end of that year. Despite substantial losses in 1942 far in excess of German losses, Red Army size grew even further, to 11 million. While there is substantial debate whether Stalin helped or hindered these industrial and manpower efforts, Stalin left most economic wartime management decisions in the hands of his economic experts. While some scholars claim that evidence suggests that Stalin considered, and even attempted, negotiating peace with Germany in 1941 and 1942, others find this evidence unconvincing and even fabricated.

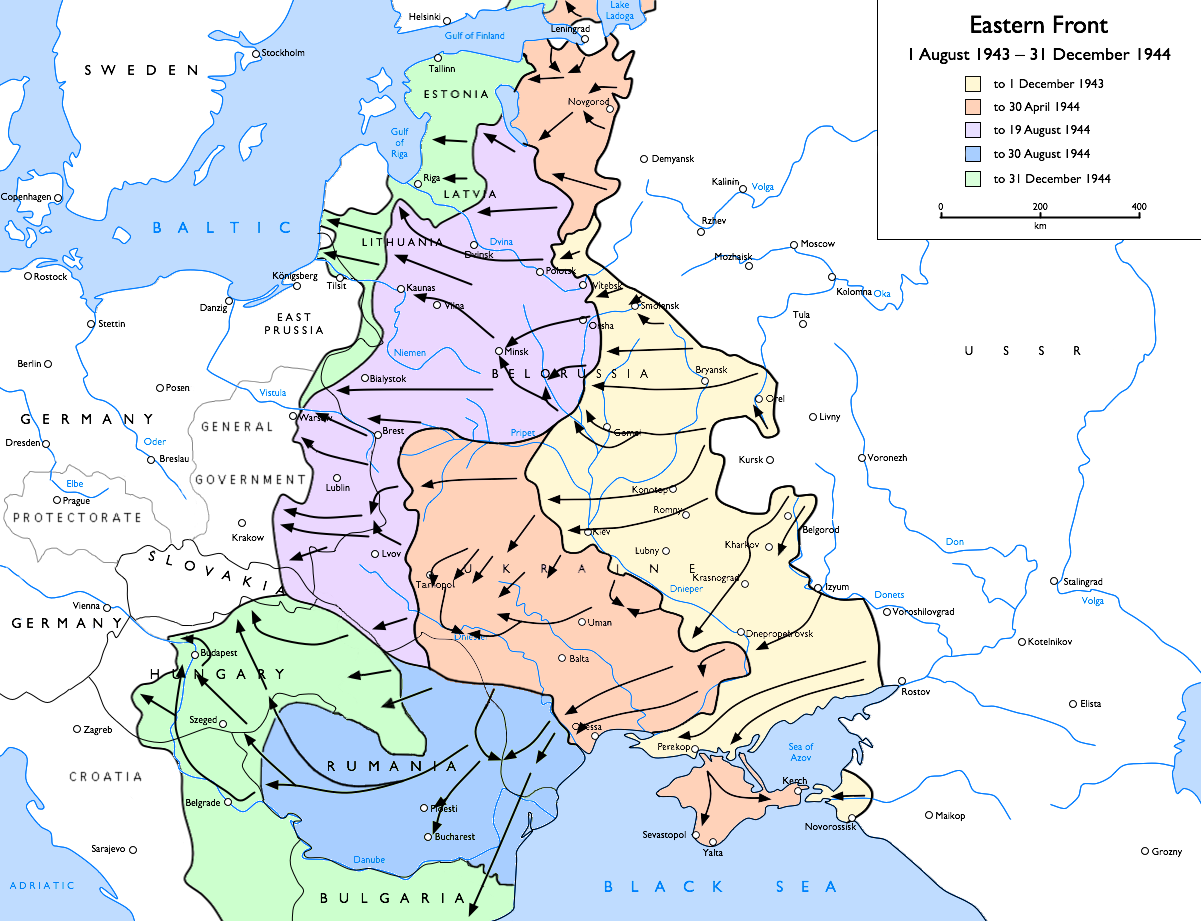
Soviet advances from 1 August 1943 to 31 December 1944: to 1 December 1943 to 30 April 1944 to 19 August 1944 to 30 August 1944 to 31 December 1944

In November 1943, Stalin met with Churchill and Roosevelt in Tehran. Roosevelt told Stalin that he hoped that Britain and America opening a second front against Germany could initially draw 30–40 German divisions from the Eastern Front. Stalin and Roosevelt, in effect, ganged up on Churchill by emphasizing the importance of a cross-channel invasion of German-held northern France, while Churchill had always felt that Germany was more vulnerable in the "soft underbelly" of Italy (which the Allies had already invaded) and the Balkans. The parties later agreed that Britain and America would launch a cross-channel invasion of France in May 1944, along with a separate invasion of Southern France. Stalin insisted that, after the war, the Soviet Union should incorporate the portions of Poland it occupied pursuant to the Molotov–Ribbentrop Pact with Germany, which Churchill tabled.

In 1944, the Soviet Union made significant advances across Eastern Europe toward Germany, including Operation Bagration, a massive offensive in Belarus against the German Army Group Centre. Stalin, Roosevelt and Churchill closely coordinated, such that Bagration occurred at roughly the same time as American and British forces initiation of the invasion of German held Western Europe on France's northern coast. The operation resulted in the Soviets retaking Belarus and western Ukraine, along with the successful effective destruction of the Army Group Center and 300,000 German casualties, though at the cost of more than 750,000 Soviet casualties.

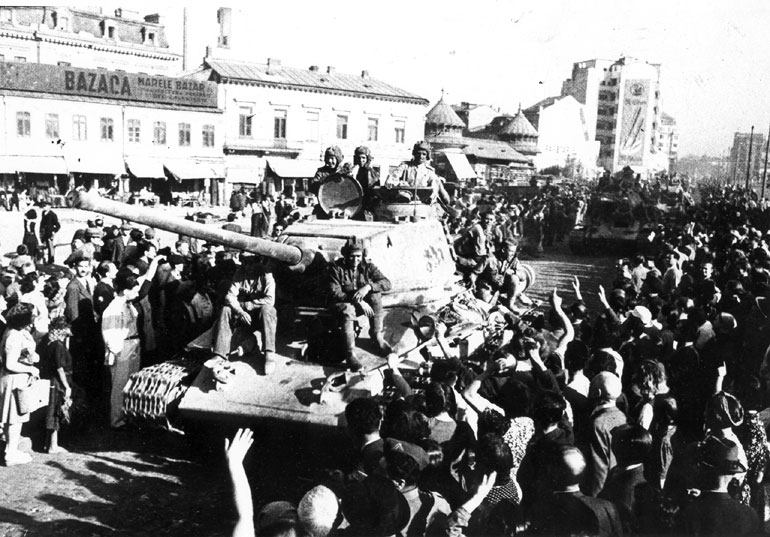
Romanians greet the Soviet army entering the city of Bucharest on 31 August 1944.

Successes at Operation Bagration and in the year that followed were, in large part, due to an operational improved of battle-hardened Red Army, which has learned painful lessons from previous years battling the powerful Wehrmacht: better planning of offensives, efficient use of artillery, better handling of time and space during attacks in contradiction to Stalin's order "not a step back". To a lesser degree, the success of Bagration was due to a weakened Wehrmacht that lacked the fuel and armament they needed to operate effectively, growing Soviet advantages in manpower and materials, and the attacks of Allies on the Western Front. In his 1944 May Day speech, Stalin praised the Western Allies for diverting German resources in the Italian Campaign, Tass published detailed lists of the large numbers of supplies coming from Western Allies, and Stalin made a speech in November 1944 stating that Allied efforts in the West had already quickly drawn 75 German divisions to defend that region, without which, the Red Army could not yet have driven the Wehrmacht from Soviet territories. The weakened Wehrmacht also helped Soviet offensives because no effective German counter-offensive could be launched,

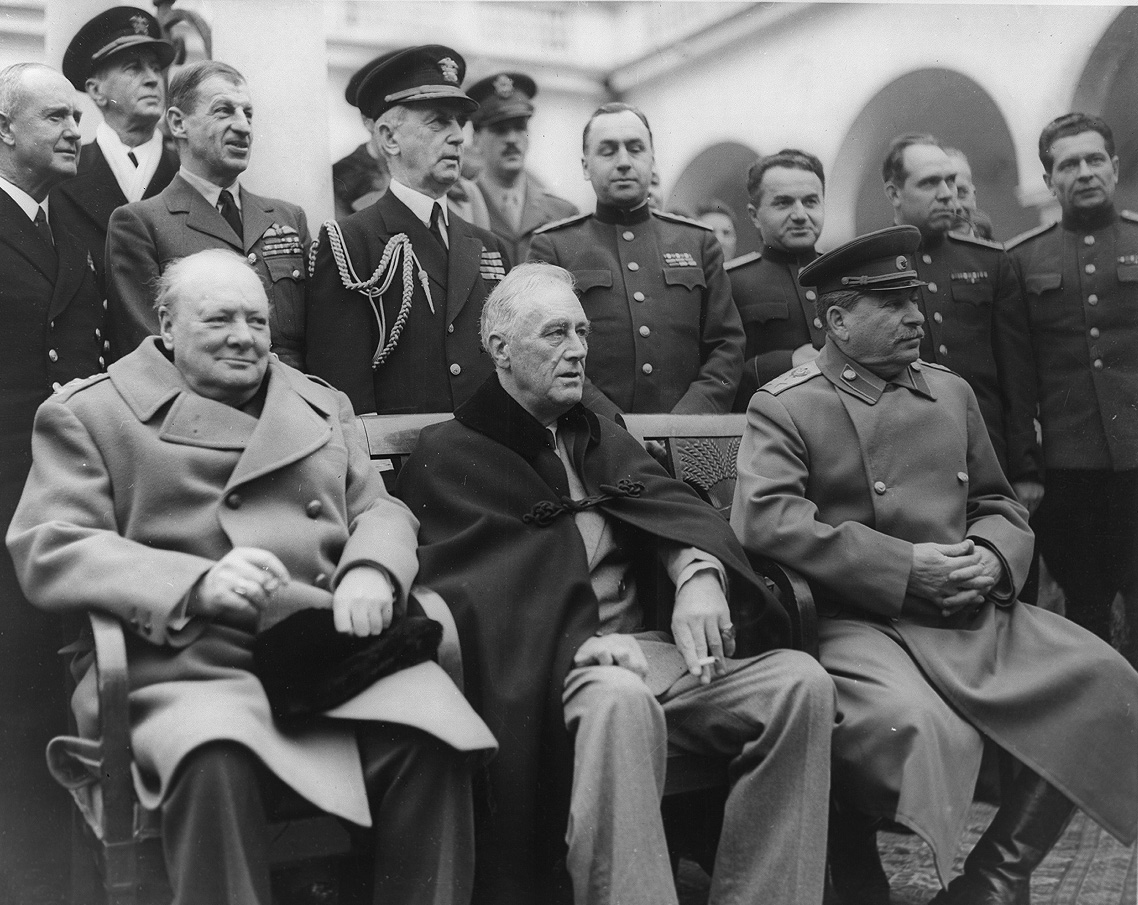
UK prime minister Winston Churchill, US president Franklin D. Roosevelt, and Soviet leader Joseph Stalin in Yalta, Soviet Union in February 1945

Beginning in the summer of 1944, a reinforced German Army Centre Group did prevent the Soviets from advancing in around Warsaw for nearly half a year. Some historians claim that the Soviets' failure to advance was a purposeful Soviet stall to allow the Wehrmacht to slaughter members of a Warsaw Uprising by the Polish home army in August 1944 that occurred as the Red Army approached, though others dispute the claim and cite sizable unsuccessful Red Army efforts to attempt to defeat the Wehrmacht in that region. Earlier in 1944, Stalin had insisted that the Soviets would annex the portions of Poland it divided with Germany in the Molotov–Ribbentrop Pact, while the Polish government in exile, which the British insisted must be involved in postwar Poland, demanded that the Polish border be restored to prewar locations. The rift further highlighted Stalin's blatant hostility toward the anti-communist Polish government in exile and their Polish home army, which Stalin felt threatened his plans to create a post-war Poland friendly to the Soviet Union. Further exacerbating the rift was Stalin's refusal to resupply the Polish home army, and his refusal to allow American supply planes to use the necessary Soviet air bases to ferry supplies to the Polish home army, which Stalin referred to in a letter to Roosevelt and Churchill as "power-seeking criminals". Worried about the possible repercussions of those actions, Stalin later began a Soviet supply airdrop to Polish rebels, though most of the supplies ended up in the hands of the Germans. The uprising ended in disaster with 20,000 Polish rebels and up to 200,000 civilians killed by German forces, with Soviet forces entering the city in January 1945.

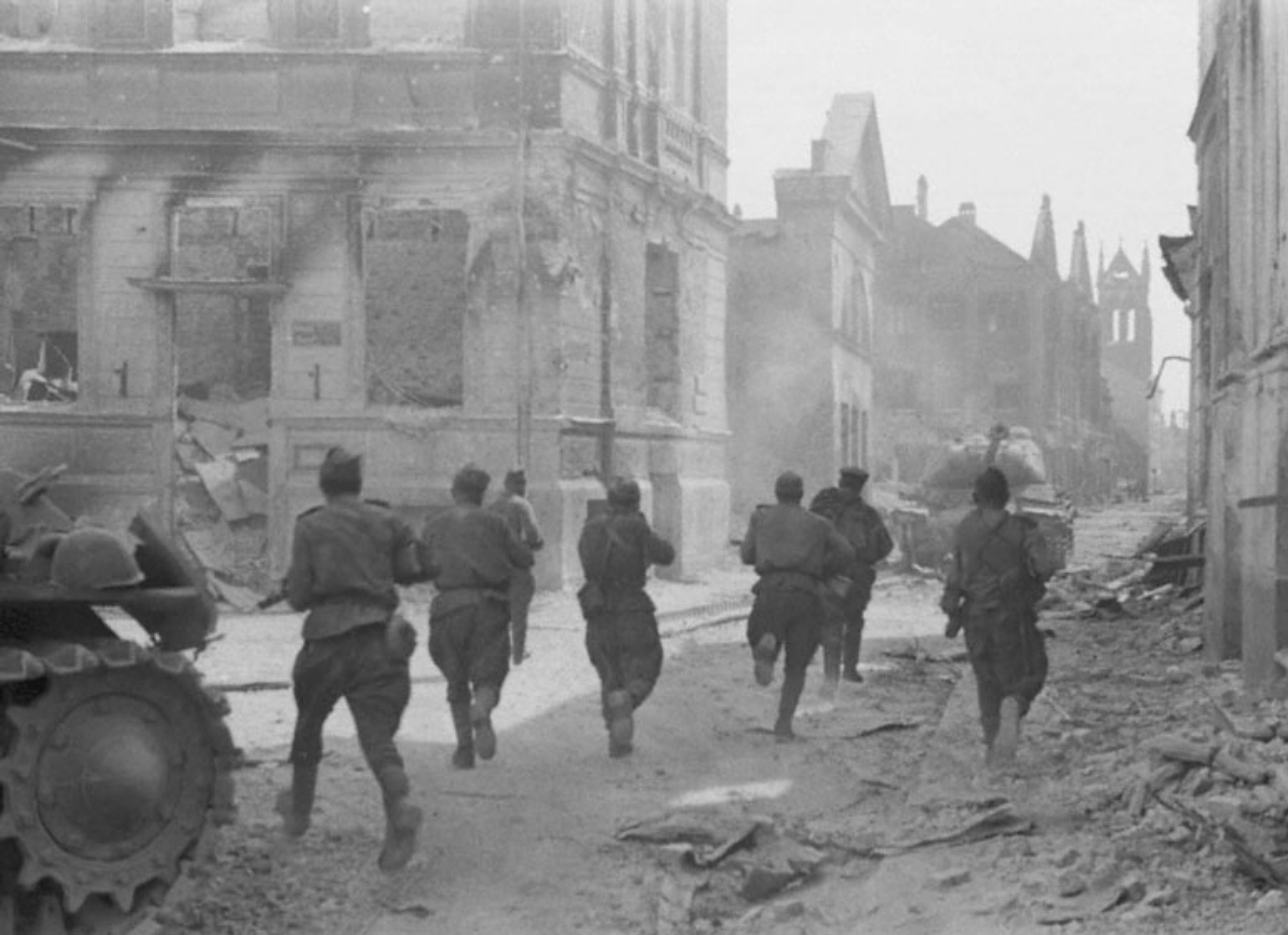
Soviet soldiers of the 1st Baltic Front during an attack in the Latvian city of Jelgava, 16 August 1944

Other important advances occurred in late 1944, such as the invasion of Romania in August and Bulgaria. The Soviet Union declared war on Bulgaria in September 1944 and invaded the country, installing a communist government. Following the invasion of these Balkan countries, Stalin and Churchill met in the autumn of 1944, where they agreed upon various percentages for "spheres of influence" in several Balkan states, though the diplomats for neither leader knew what the term actually meant. The Red Army also expelled German forces from Lithuania and Estonia in late 1944 at the cost of 260,000 Soviet casualties.

The Vyborg–Petrozavodsk offensive expelled Finnish forces from territory they had gained in 1941, but the Soviet advance was halted at the Battle of Tali-Ihantala. Further north, Finnish victories in the Battles of Vuosalmi and Ilomantsi halted additional Soviet attempts to break through Finnish lines. The Finns and Soviets signed the Moscow Armistice on 19 September 1944, ending the Continuation War.

In late 1944, Soviet forces battled fiercely to capture Hungary in the Budapest Offensive, but could not take it, which became a topic so sensitive to Stalin that he refused to allow his commanders to speak of it. The Germans held out in the subsequent Battle of Budapest until February 1945, when the remaining Hungarians signed an armistice with the Soviet Union. Victory at Budapest permitted the Red Army to launch the Vienna Offensive in April 1945. To the northeast, the taking of Belarus and western Ukraine permitted the Soviets to launch the massive Vistula–Oder Offensive, where German intelligence had incorrectly guessed the Soviets would have a 3-to-1 numerical superiority advantage that was actually 5-to-1 (over 2 million Red Army personnel attacking 450,000 German defenders), the successful culmination of which resulted in the Red Army advancing from the Vistula River in Poland to the German Oder River in Eastern Germany.

Stalin's shortcomings as a strategist are frequently noted regarding the massive Soviet loss of life and early Soviet defeats. An example of it is the summer offensive of 1942, which led to even more losses by the Red Army and the recapture of initiative by the Germans. Stalin eventually recognized his lack of know-how and relied on his professional generals to conduct the war.

Additionally, Stalin was well aware that other European armies had utterly disintegrated when faced with Nazi military efficacy and responded effectively by subjecting his army to galvanizing terror and nationalist appeals to patriotism. He also appealed to the Russian Orthodox Church.

== Final victory ==
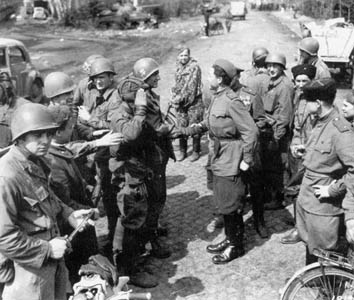
American and Soviet troops meet east of the Elbe River, April 1945

By April 1945, Nazi Germany faced its last days, with 1.9 million German soldiers in the East fighting 6.4 million Red Army soldiers while 1 million German soldiers in the West battled 4 million Western Allied soldiers. While initial talk postulated a race to Berlin by the Allies, after Stalin successfully lobbied for Eastern Germany to fall within the Soviet "sphere of influence" at Yalta in February 1945, the Western Allies made no plans to seize the city by a ground operation. Stalin remained suspicious that western Allied forces holding at the Elbe River might move on the German capital and, even in the last days, that the Americans might employ their two airborne divisions to capture the city.

Stalin directed the Red Army to move rapidly in a broad front into Germany because he did not believe the Western Allies would hand over territory they occupied, while he made capturing Berlin the overriding objective. After successfully capturing Eastern Prussia, three Red Army fronts converged on the heart of eastern Germany, and the Battle of the Oder-Neisse put the Soviets at the virtual gates of Berlin. By 24 April elements of two Soviet fronts had encircled Berlin. On 20 April Zhukov's 1st Belorussian Front had begun a massive shelling of Berlin that would not end until the city's surrender. On 30 April 1945 Hitler and Eva Braun committed suicide, after which Soviet forces found their remains, which had been burned at Hitler's directive. Remaining German forces officially surrendered unconditionally on 7 May 1945. Some historians argue that Stalin delayed the last final push for Berlin by two months in order to capture other areas for political reasons, which they argue gave the Wehrmacht time to prepare and increased Soviet casualties (which exceeded 400,000); other historians contest this account.

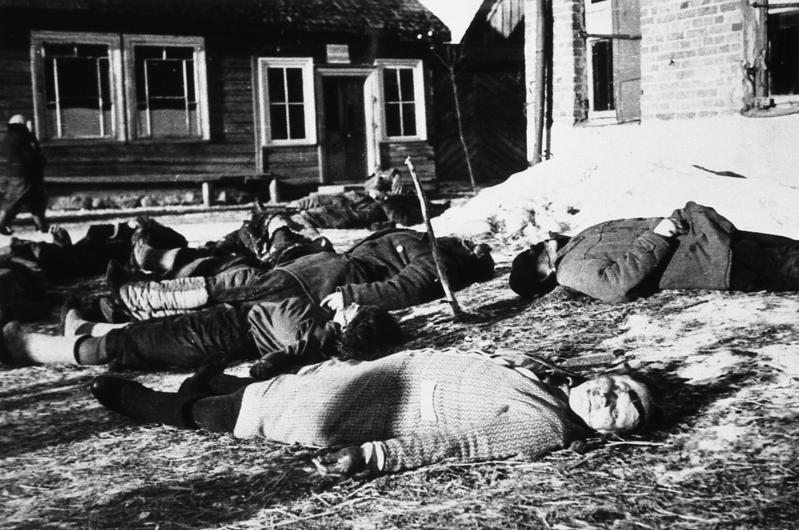
Mass murder of Soviet civilians near Minsk. The Nazis murdered civilians in 5,295 different localities in occupied Soviet Belarus.

Despite the Soviets' possession of Hitler's remains, Stalin did not believe that his old nemesis was actually dead, a belief that persisted for years after the war. Stalin later directed aides to spend years researching and writing a secret book about Hitler's life for his own private reading.

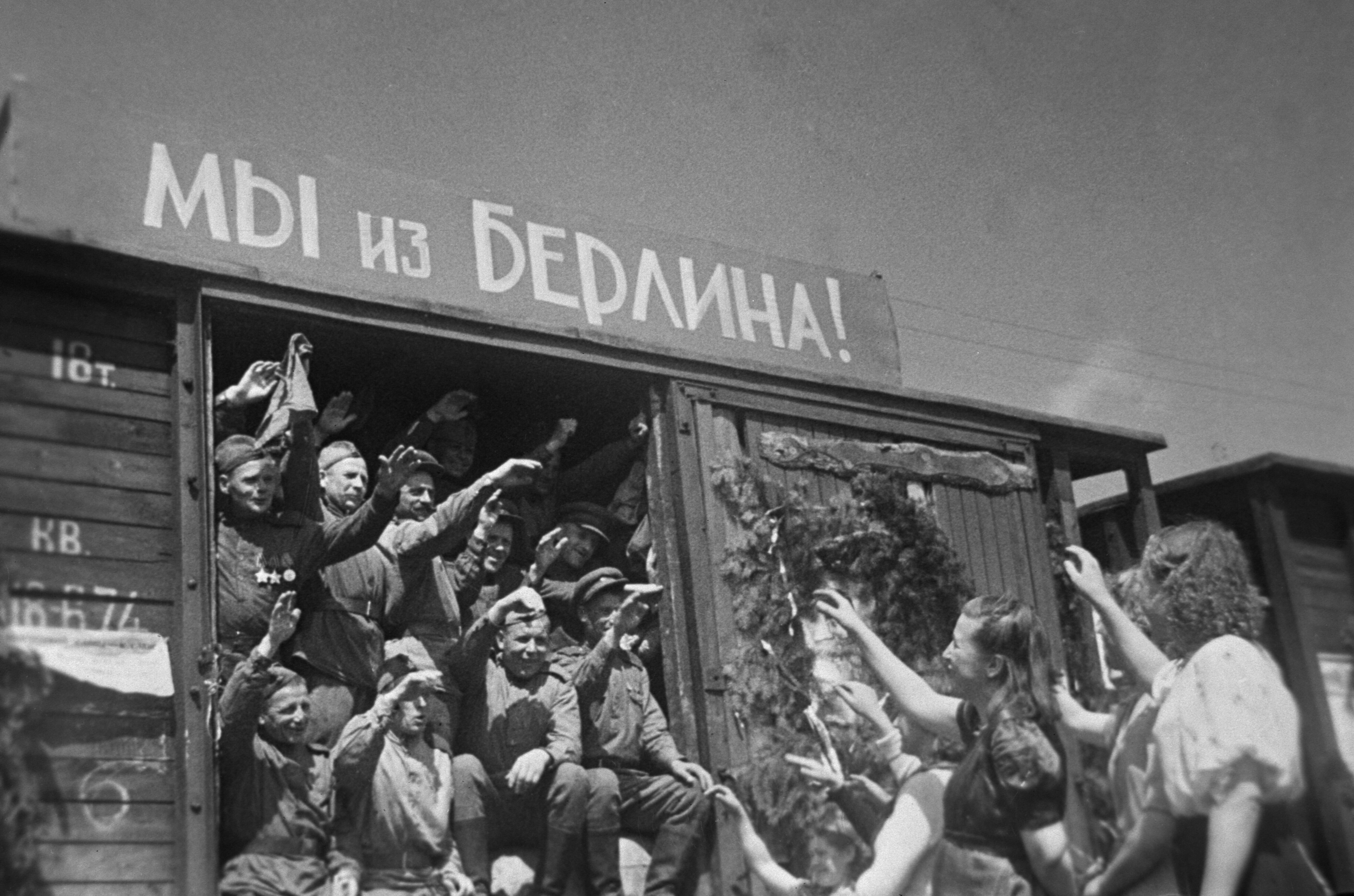
Meeting demobilized soldiers at the Minsk railway station, July 1945

Fending off the German invasion and pressing to victory over Nazi Germany in the Second World War required a tremendous sacrifice by the Soviet Union (more than by any other country in human history). Soviet casualties totaled around 27 million. Although figures vary, the Soviet civilian death toll probably reached 18 million. Millions of Soviet soldiers and civilians disappeared into German detention camps and slave-labor factories, while millions more suffered permanent physical and mental damage. Soviet economic losses, including losses in resources and manufacturing capacity in western Russia and Ukraine, were also catastrophic. The war resulted in the destruction of approximately 70,000 Soviet cities, towns and villages - 6 million houses, 98,000 farms, 32,000 factories, 82,000 schools, 43,000 libraries, 6,000 hospitals and thousands of kilometers of roads and railway track.

On 9 August 1945, the Soviet Union invaded Japanese-controlled Manchukuo and declared war on Japan. Battle-hardened Soviet troops and their experienced commanders rapidly conquered Japanese-held territories in Manchuria, southern Sakhalin (11-25 August 1945), the Kuril Islands (18 August to 1 September 1945) and parts of Korea (14 August 1945 to 24 August 1945). The Imperial Japanese government, vacillating following the bombing of Hiroshima (6 August 1945) and Nagasaki (9 August 1945), but faced with Soviet forces fast approaching the core Japanese homeland, announced its effective surrender to the Allies on 15 August 1945 and formally capitulated on 2 September 1945.

In June 1945, the Politburo of the Communist Party of the Soviet Union conferred on Stalin for his role in the Soviet victory the newly invented rank of Generalissimo of the Soviet Union, which became the country's highest military rank (superior to Marshal). Stalin's "cult of personality" emphasised his personal military leadership after the enumeration of "Stalin's ten victories" - extracted from Stalin's 6 November 1944 speech "27th anniversary of the Great October socialist revolution" (Russian: «27-я годовщина Великой Октябрьской социалистической революции») during the 1944 meeting of the Moscow Soviet of People's Deputies.

== Repressions ==
On 16 August 1941, in attempts to revive a disorganized Soviet defense system, Stalin issued Order No. 270, demanding any commanders or commissars "tearing away their insignia and deserting or surrendering" to be considered malicious deserters. The order required superiors to shoot these deserters on the spot. Their family members were subjected to arrest. The second provision of the order directed all units fighting in encirclements to use every possibility to fight. The order also required division commanders to demote and, if necessary, even to shoot on the spot those commanders who failed to command the battle directly in the battlefield. Thereafter, Stalin also conducted a purge of several military commanders that were shot for "cowardice" without a trial.

In June 1941, weeks after the German invasion began, Stalin directed that the retreating Red Army also sought to deny resources to the enemy through a scorched earth policy of destroying the infrastructure and food supplies of areas before the Germans could seize them, and that partisans were to be set up in evacuated areas. This, along with abuse by German troops, caused starvation and suffering among the civilian population that was left behind. Stalin feared that Hitler would use disgruntled Soviet citizens to fight his regime, particularly people imprisoned in the Gulags. He thus ordered the NKVD to handle the situation. They responded by murdering approximately 100,000 political prisoners throughout the western parts of the Soviet Union, with methods that included bayoneting people to death and tossing grenades into crowded cells. Many others were simply deported east.

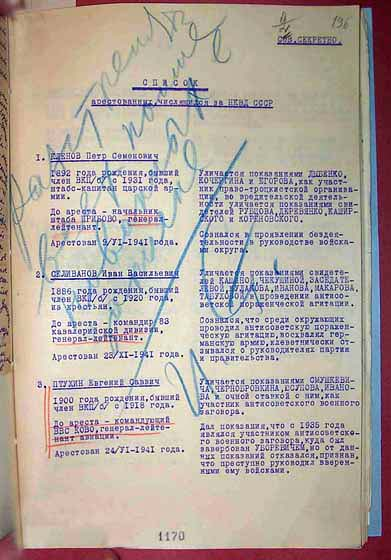
Beria's proposal of 29 January 1942, to execute 46 Soviet generals. Stalin's resolution: "Shoot all named in the list. – J. St."

In July 1942, Stalin issued Order No. 227, directing that any commander or commissar of a regiment, battalion or army, who allowed retreat without permission from his superiors was subject to military tribunal. The order called for soldiers found guilty of disciplinary infractions to be forced into "penal battalions", which were sent to the most dangerous sections of the front lines. From 1942 to 1945, 427,910 soldiers were assigned to penal battalions. The order also directed "blocking detachments" to shoot fleeing panicked troops at the rear. In the first three months following the order 1,000 penal troops were shot by "blocking detachments, and sent 24,933 troops to penal battalions. Despite having some effect initially, this measure proved to have a deteriorating effect on the troops' morale, so by October 1942 the idea of regular blocking detachments was quietly dropped By 29 October 1944 the blocking detachments were officially disbanded.

Soviet POWs and forced labourers who survived German captivity were sent to special "transit" or "filtration" camps meant to determine which were potential traitors. Of the approximately 4 million to be repatriated, 2,660,013 were civilians and 1,539,475 were former POWs. Of the total, 2,427,906 were sent home, 801,152 were reconscripted into the armed forces, 608,095 were enrolled in the work battalions of the defence ministry, 226,127 were transferred to the authority of the NKVD for punishment, which meant a transfer to the Gulag system and 89,468 remained in the transit camps as reception personnel until the repatriation process was finally wound up in the early 1950s.

== Soviet war crimes ==
"... Whenever I mentioned the heartlessness of our highest-ranking bureaucrats, the cruelty of our executioners, I remember myself in my Captain's shoulder boards and the forward march of my battery through East Prussia, enshrouded in fire, and I say: 'So were we any better?'

— Aleksandr Solzhenitsyn, The Gulag Archipelago

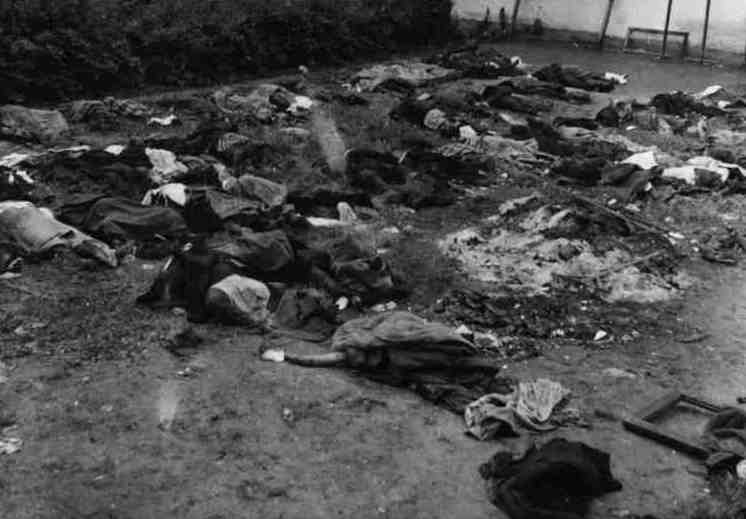
Victims of NKVD prisoner massacres in June 1941

Soviet troops reportedly raped German women and girls, with total victim estimates ranging from tens of thousands to two million. During and after the occupation of Budapest, (Hungary), an estimated 50,000 women and girls were raped. Regarding rapes that took place in Yugoslavia, Stalin responded to a Yugoslav partisan leader's complaints saying, "Can't he understand it if a soldier who has crossed thousands of kilometres through blood and fire and death has fun with a woman or takes some trifle?"

In former Axis countries, such as Germany, Romania, and Hungary, Red Army officers generally viewed cities, villages and farms as being open to pillaging and looting. For example, Red Army soldiers and NKVD members frequently looted transport trains in 1944 and 1945 in Poland and Soviet soldiers set fire to the city centre of Demmin while preventing the inhabitants from extinguishing the blaze, which, along with multiple rapes, played a part in causing over 900 citizens of the city to commit suicide. In the Soviet occupation zone of Germany, when members of the SED reported to Stalin that looting and rapes by Soviet soldiers could result in negative consequences for the future of socialism in post-war East Germany, Stalin reacted angrily: "I shall not tolerate anybody dragging the honour of the Red Army through the mud." Accordingly, all evidence of looting, rapes and destruction by the Red Army was deleted from archives in the Soviet occupation zone.

According to recent figures, of an estimated 4 million POWs taken by the Russians, including Germans, Japanese, Hungarians, Romanians, and others, some 580,000 never returned, presumably victims of privation or the Gulags, compared with 3.5 million Soviet POW who died in German camps out of the 5.6 million taken.

== War crimes by Nazi Germany ==
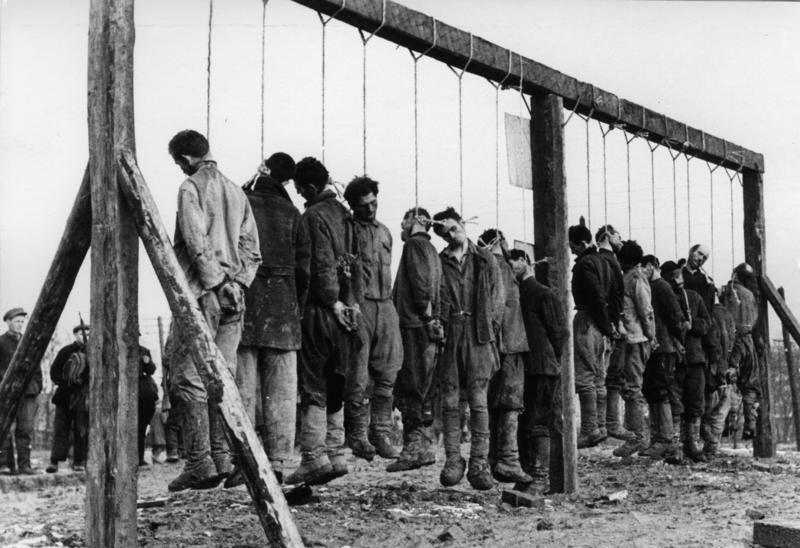
Men hanged as suspected partisans somewhere in the Soviet Union

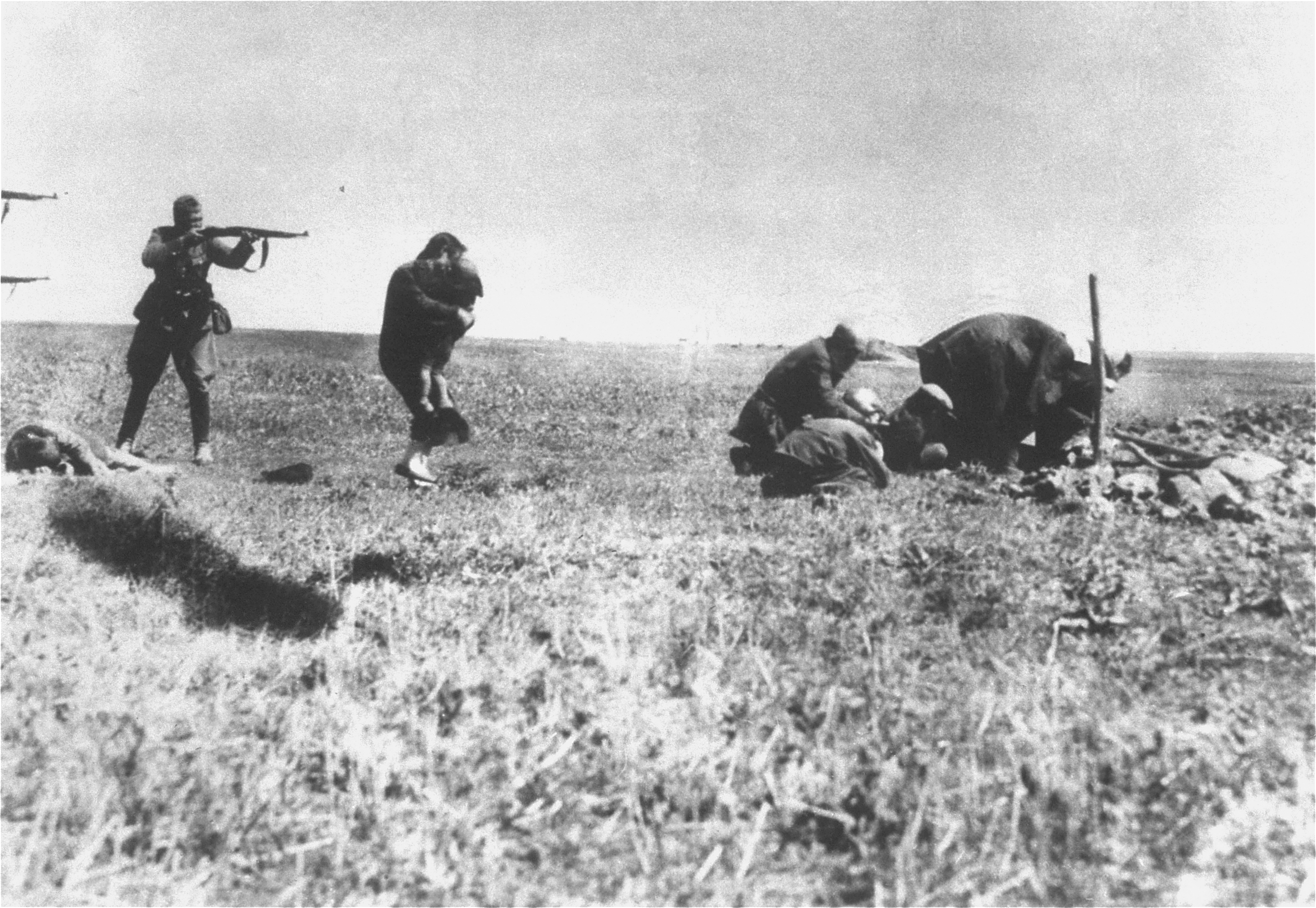
German Einsatzgruppen murdering Jews in Ivanhorod, Ukraine, 1942

Nazi propaganda had told Wehrmacht's soldiers the invasion of the Soviet Union was a war of extermination.

British historian Ian Kershaw concludes that the Wehrmacht's duty was to ensure that the people who met Hitler's requirements of being part of the Aryan Herrenvolk ("Aryan master race") had living space. He wrote that:

The Nazi revolution was broader than just the Holocaust. Its second goal was to eliminate Slavs from central and eastern Europe and to create a Lebensraum for Aryans. ... As Bartov (The Eastern Front; Hitler's Army) shows, it barbarised the German armies on the eastern front. Most of their three million men, from generals to ordinary soldiers, helped exterminate captured Slav soldiers and civilians. This was sometimes cold and deliberate murder of individuals (as with Jews), sometimes generalised brutality and neglect. ... German soldiers' letters and memoirs reveal their terrible reasoning: Slavs were 'the Asiatic-Bolshevik' horde, an inferior but threatening race

During the rapid German advances in the early months of the war, nearly reaching the cities of Moscow and Leningrad, the bulk of Soviet industry which could not be evacuated was either destroyed or lost due to German occupation. Agricultural production was interrupted, with grain harvests left standing in the fields that would later cause hunger reminiscent of the early 1930s. In one of the greatest feats of war logistics, factories were evacuated on an enormous scale, with 1523 factories dismantled and shipped eastwards along four principal routes to the Caucasus, Central Asian, Ural, and Siberian regions. In general, the tools, dies and production technology were moved, along with the blueprints and their management, engineering staffs and skilled labor.

The whole of the Soviet Union became dedicated to the war effort. The population of the Soviet Union was probably better prepared than any other nation involved in the fighting of World War II to endure the material hardships of the war. This is primarily because the Soviets were so used to shortages and coping with economic crisis in the past, especially during wartime—World War I brought similar restrictions on food. Still, conditions were severe. World War II was especially devastating to Soviet citizens because it was fought on their territory and caused massive destruction. In Leningrad, under German siege, over one million people died of starvation and disease. Many factory workers were teenagers, women and the elderly. The government implemented rationing in 1941 and first applied it to bread, flour, cereal, pasta, butter, margarine, vegetable oil, meat, fish, sugar, and confectionery all across the country. The rations remained largely stable in other places during the war. Additional rations were often so expensive that they could not add substantially to a citizen's food supply unless that person was especially well-paid. Peasants received no rations and had to make do with local resources that they farmed themselves. Most rural peasants struggled and lived in unbearable poverty, but others sold any surplus they had at a high price and a few became rouble millionaires, until a currency reform two years after the end of the war wiped out their wealth.

Despite harsh conditions, the war led to a spike in Soviet nationalism and unity. Soviet propaganda toned down extreme Communist rhetoric of the past as the people now rallied by a belief of protecting their Motherland against the evils of German invaders. Ethnic minorities thought to be collaborators were forced into exile. Religion, which was previously shunned, became a part of Communist Party propaganda campaign in the Soviet society in order to mobilize the religious elements.

The social composition of Soviet society changed drastically during the war. There was a burst of marriages in June and July 1941 between people about to be separated by the war and in the next few years the marriage rate dropped off steeply, with the birth rate following shortly thereafter to only about half of what it would have been in peacetime. For this reason mothers with several children during the war received substantial honours and money benefits if they had a sufficient number of children—mothers could earn around 1,300 roubles for having their fourth child and earn up to 5,000 roubles for their 10th.

German soldiers used to brand the bodies of captured partisan women – and other women as well – with the words "Whore for Hitler's troops" and rape them. Following their capture some German soldiers vividly bragged about committing rape and rape-homicide. Susan Brownmiller argues that rape played a pivotal role in Nazi aim to conquer and destroy people they considered inferior, such as Jews, Russians, and Poles. An extensive list of rapes committed by German soldiers was compiled in the so-called "Molotov Note" in 1942. Brownmiller points out that Nazis used rape as a weapon of terror.

== Survival in Leningrad ==
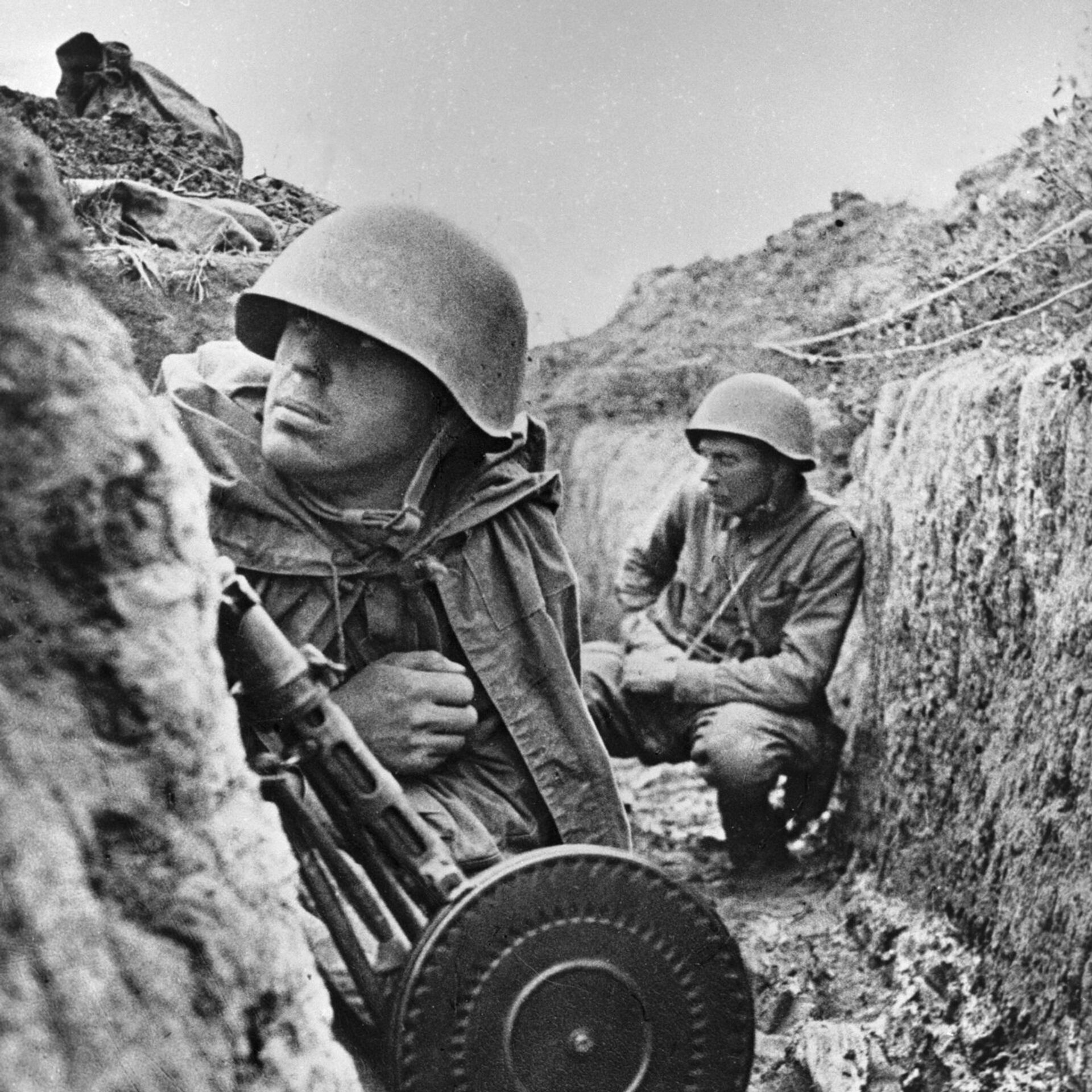
Soviet soldiers on the front in Leningrad

The city of Leningrad endured more suffering and hardships than any other city in the Soviet Union during the war, as it was under siege for 872 days, from 8 September 1941, to 27 January 1944. Hunger, malnutrition, disease, starvation, and even cannibalism became common during the siege of Leningrad; civilians lost weight, grew weaker, and became more vulnerable to diseases. Citizens of Leningrad managed to survive through a number of methods with varying degrees of success. Since only 400,000 people were evacuated before the siege began, this left 2.5 million in Leningrad, including 400,000 children. More managed to escape the city; this was most successful when Lake Ladoga froze over and people could walk over the ice road—or "Road of Life"—to safety.

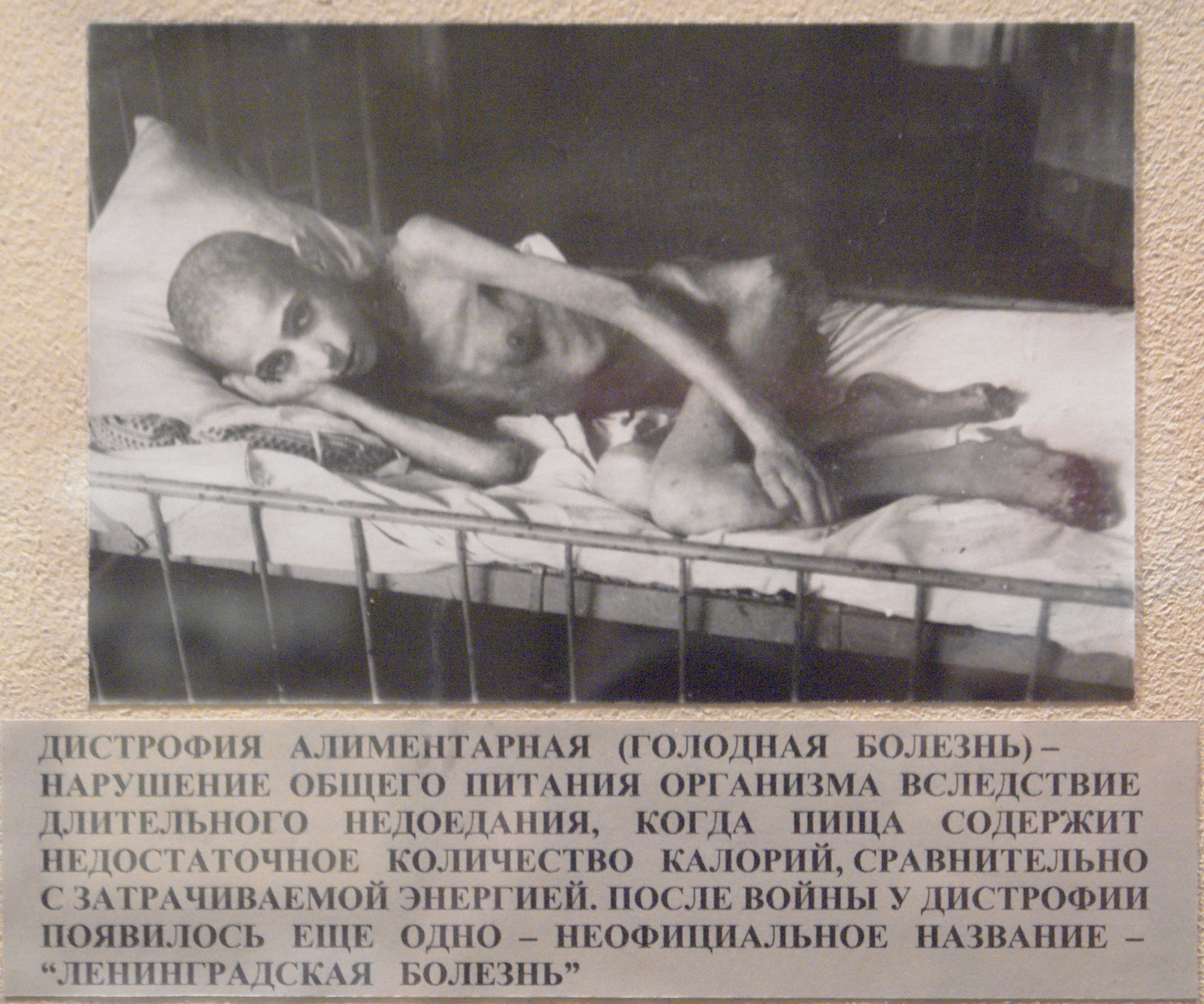
A victim of starvation in besieged Leningrad in 1941

Most survival strategies during the siege, though, involved staying within the city and facing the problems through resourcefulness or luck. One way to do this was by securing factory employment because many factories became autonomous and possessed more of the tools of survival during the winter, such as food and heat. Workers got larger rations than regular civilians and factories were likely to have electricity if they produced crucial goods. Factories also served as mutual-support centers and had clinics and other services like cleaning crews and teams of women who would sew and repair clothes. Factory employees were still driven to desperation on occasion and people resorted to eating glue or horses in factories where food was scarce, but factory employment was the most consistently successful method of survival, and at some food production plants not a single person died.

Survival opportunities open to the larger Soviet community included bartering and farming on private land. Black markets thrived as private barter and trade became more common, especially between soldiers and civilians. Soldiers, who had more food to spare, were eager to trade with Soviet citizens that had extra warm clothes to trade. Planting vegetable gardens in the spring became popular, primarily because citizens got to keep everything grown on their own plots. The campaign also had a potent psychological effect and boosted morale, a survival component almost as crucial as bread.

Some of the most desperate Soviet citizens turned to crime as a way to support themselves in trying times. Most common was the theft of food and of ration cards, which could prove fatal for a malnourished person if their card was stolen more than a day or two before a new card was issued. For these reasons, the stealing of food was severely punished and a person could be shot for as little as stealing a loaf of bread. More serious crimes, such as murder and cannibalism, also occurred, and special police squads were set up to combat these crimes, though by the end of the siege, roughly 1,500 had been arrested for cannibalism.

== Aftermath and damages ==
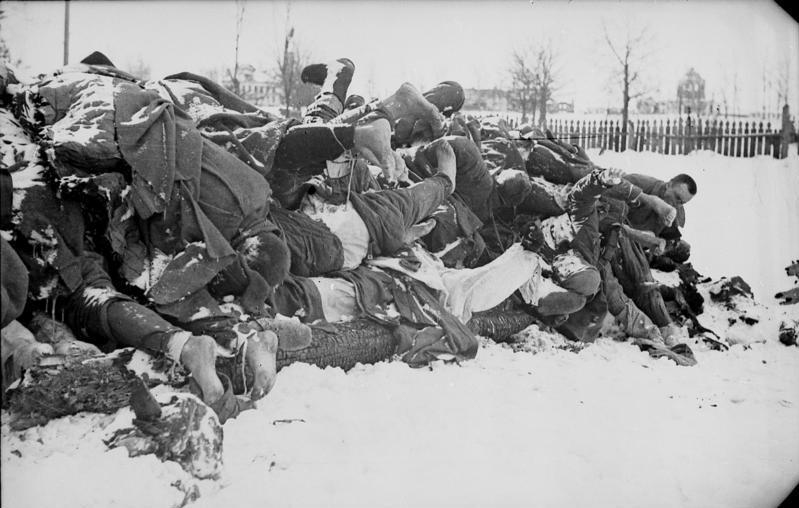
Soviet soldiers killed during the Toropets–Kholm Offensive, January 1942

Even though it won the conflict, the war had a profound and devastating long-term effect in the Soviet Union. The financial burden was catastrophic: by one estimate, the Soviet Union spent $192 billion. The US sent around $11 billion in Lend-Lease supplies to the Soviet Union during the war.

American experts estimate that the Soviet Union lost almost all the wealth it gained from the industrialization efforts during the 1930s. Its economy also shrank by 20% between 1941 and 1945 and did not recover its pre-war levels all until the 1960s. British historian Clive Ponting estimates that the war damages amounted to 25 years of the Soviet Gross National Product. Forty percent of the Soviet housing was damaged or destroyed. Out of 2.5 million housing dwellings in the German occupied territories, over a million were destroyed. This rendered some 25 million Soviet citizens homeless. The German occupation encompassed around 85 million Soviet citizens, or almost 45% of the entire Soviet population. At least 12 million Soviets fled towards the east, away from the invading German army. The Soviet sources claim that the Axis powers destroyed 1,710 towns and 70,000 villages, as well as 65,000 km of railroad tracks. German-occupied Soviet territory encompassed 2,201,489 km^{2} (850,000 sq mi).

The post-Soviet government of Russia puts the Soviet war 'losses' at 26.6 million, on the basis of the 1993 study by the Russian Academy of Sciences, including people dying as a result of battle and war related exposure. This includes 8,668,400 military deaths as calculated by the Russian Ministry of Defense.

The figures published by the Russian Ministry of Defense have been accepted by the majority of historians and academics, some historians and academics give different estimates.

Bruce Robellet Kuniholm, professor of public policy and history, estimates that the Soviet side suffered 11,000,000 military deaths and additional 7,000,000 civilian deaths, thus amounting to a total of 18 million fatalities. American military historian Earl F. Ziemke gives a figure of 12 million dead Soviet soldiers and further seven million dead civilians—a total of 19 million dead. He also notes that from autumn 1941 until autumn 1943 the front was never less than 2,400 miles (3,900 km) long. German professor Beate Fieseler estimates that 2.6 million people, or 7.46 percent of the Soviet Army, were left disabled after the war.

== Public opinion survey ==
A poll conducted by YouGov in 2015 found that only 11% of Americans, 15% of French, 15% of Britons, and 27% of Germans believed that the Soviet Union contributed most to the defeat of Nazi Germany in World War II. In contrast, the survey conducted in May 1945 found that 57% of the French public believed the Soviet Union contributed most.

== General and cited references ==
- Brackman, Roman (2001), The Secret File of Joseph Stalin: A Hidden Life, Frank Cass Publishers, ISBN 0-7146-5050-1
- Brent, Jonathan; Naumov, Vladimir (2004), Stalin's Last Crime: The Plot Against the Jewish Doctors, 1948–1953, HarperCollins, ISBN 0-06-093310-0
- Dowling, Timothy C. (2014), Russia at War: From the Mongol Conquest to Afghanistan, Chechnya, and Beyond, ABC-Clio, ISBN 9781598849486
- Goldman, Stuart D. (2012). Nomonhan, 1939; The Red Army's Victory That Shaped World War II. Naval Institute Press. ISBN 978-1-61251-098-9.
- Henig, Ruth Beatrice (2005), The Origins of the Second World War, 1933–41, Routledge, ISBN 0-415-33262-1
- Kuniholm, Bruce Robellet (2014), The Origins of the Cold War in the Near East: Great Power Conflict and Diplomacy in Iran, Turkey, and Greece (revised ed.), Princeton University Press, ISBN 9781400855759
- Lee, Lily Xiao Hong (2016), World War Two: Crucible of the Contemporary World - Commentary and Readings, Routledge, ISBN 9781315489551
- Lewkowicz Nicolas, The German Question and the Origins of the Cold War (IPOC, Milan) (2008) ISBN 8895145275
- Merridale, Catherine (2006). Ivan's War: Life and Death in the Red Army, 1939–1945. New York : Metropolitan Books. ISBN 978-0-312-42652-1. OCLC 60671899.
- Murphy, David E. (2006), What Stalin Knew: The Enigma of Barbarossa, Yale University Press, ISBN 0-300-11981-X
- Nekrich, Aleksandr Moiseevich; Ulam, Adam Bruno; Freeze, Gregory L. (1997), Pariahs, Partners, Predators: German-Soviet Relations, 1922–1941, Columbia University Press, ISBN 0-231-10676-9
- Pauwels, Jacques (2015), The Myth of the Good War: America in the Second World War (second ed.), James Lorimer & Company, ISBN 9781459408739
- Phillips, Sarah D. (2009). ""There Are No Invalids in the USSR!": A Missing Soviet Chapter in the New Disability History". Disability Studies Quarterly. 29 (3). Indiana University. doi:10.18061/dsq.v29i3.936.
- Poetschke, Hubert (2008), Memoirs from the Turbulent Years and Beyond: Analysis and Consequences of the World War II, Xlibris Corporation, ISBN 9781453583401
- Roberts, Geoffrey (2006), Stalin's Wars: From World War to Cold War, 1939–1953, Yale University Press, ISBN 0-300-11204-1
- Roberts, Geoffrey (2002), Stalin, the Pact with Nazi Germany, and the Origins of Postwar Soviet Diplomatic Historiography, vol. 4
- Roberts, Geoffrey (1992), "The Soviet Decision for a Pact with Nazi Germany", Soviet Studies, 55 (2): 57–78, doi:10.1080/09668139208411994, JSTOR 152247
- Rottman, Gordon (2007), Soviet Rifleman 1941–1945, Osprey, ISBN 978-1846031274
- Roy, Kaushik (2022). Modern Insurgencies and Counterinsurgencies: A Global History. Taylor & Francis. ISBN 9781000628753.
- Soviet Information Bureau (1948), Falsifiers of History (Historical Survey), Moscow: Foreign Languages Publishing House, 272848
- Department of State (1948), Nazi-Soviet Relations, 1939–1941: Documents from the Archives of The German Foreign Office, Department of State
- U.S. Government Printing Office (1971), Industrialized Building in the Soviet Union: a Report of the U.S. Delegation to the U.S.S.R., vol. 13
- Taubert, Fritz (2003), The Myth of Munich, Oldenbourg Wissenschaftsverlag, ISBN 3-486-56673-3
- Varga-Harris, Christine (2015), Stories of House and Home: Soviet Apartment Life During the Khrushchev Years, Cornell University Press, ISBN 9781501701849
- Watson, Derek (2000), "Molotov's Apprenticeship in Foreign Policy: The Triple Alliance Negotiations in 1939", Europe-Asia Studies, 52 (4): 695–722, doi:10.1080/713663077, JSTOR 153322, S2CID 144385167
- Wells, Michael; Wells, Mike (2011), History for the IB Diploma: Causes, Practices and Effects of Wars, Cambridge University Press, ISBN 9780521189316
- Wettig, Gerhard (2008), Stalin and the Cold War in Europe, Rowman & Littlefield, ISBN 978-0-7425-5542-6
- Ziemke, Earl F. (1971). Stalingrad to Berlin: The German Defeat in the East. Government Printing Office. ISBN 9780160882746.

=== Home Front ===
- Abramov, Vladimir K. "Mordovia During the Second World War," Journal of Slavic Military Studies (2008) 21#2 pp 291–363.
- Annaorazov, Jumadurdy. "Turkmenistan during the Second World War," Journal of Slavic Military Studies (2012) 25#1 pp 53–64.
- Barber, John, and Mark Harrison. The Soviet Home Front: A Social and Economic History of the USSR in World War II, Longman, 1991.
- Berkhoff, Karel C. Harvest of Despair: Life and Death in Ukraine Under Nazi Rule. Harvard U. Press, 2004. 448 pp.
- Braithwaite, Rodric. Moscow 1941: A City and Its People at War (2006)
- Carmack, Roberto J. Kazakhstan in World War II: Mobilization and Ethnicity in the Soviet Empire (University Press of Kansas, 2019) online review
- Dallin, Alexander. Odessa, 1941–1944: A Case Study of Soviet Territory under Foreign Rule. Portland: Int. Specialized Book Service, 1998. 296 pp.
- Ellmana, Michael, and S. Maksudovb. "Soviet deaths in the great patriotic war: A note," Europe-Asia Studies (1994) 46#4 pp 671–680 doi:10.1080/09668139408412190
- Glantz, David M. (2001). The Siege of Leningrad, 1941–1944: 900 Days of Terror. Zenith. ISBN 978-0-7603-0941-4.
- Goldman, Wendy Z., and Donald Filtzer. Fortress Dark and Stern: The Soviet Home Front During World War II (Oxford University Press, 2021). online review
- Goldman, Wendy Z., and Donald Filtzer. Hunger and War: Food Provisioning in the Soviet Union during World War II (Indiana UP, 2015)
- Hill, Alexander. "British Lend-Lease Aid and the Soviet War Effort, June 1941 – June 1942," Journal of Military History (2007) 71#3 pp 773–808.
- Overy, Richard. Russia's War: A History of the Soviet Effort: 1941–1945 (1998) 432pp excerpt and txt search
- Reese, Roger R. "Motivations to Serve: The Soviet Soldier in the Second World War," Journal of Slavic Military Studies (2007) 10#2 pp 263–282.
- Thurston, Robert W. & Bernd Bonwetsch (2000). The People's War: Responses to World War II in the Soviet Union. U. of Illinois Press. p. 84. ISBN 978-0-252-02600-3.
- Vallin, Jacques; Meslé, France; Adamets, Serguei; and Pyrozhkov, Serhii. "A New Estimate of Ukrainian Population Losses During the Crises of the 1930s and 1940s." Population Studies (2002) 56(3): 249–264. JSTOR 3092980 Reports life expectancy at birth fell to a level as low as ten years for females and seven for males in 1933 and plateaued around 25 for females and 15 for males in the period 1941–44.

==== Primary sources ====
- Bidlack, Richard; Nikita Lomagin, eds. (26 June 2012). The Leningrad Blockade, 1941–1944: A New Documentary History from the Soviet Archives. Yale U.P. ISBN 978-0300110296.
- Hill, Alexander, ed. The Great Patriotic War of the Soviet Union, 1941–45: A Documentary Reader (2011) 368pp

=== Historiography ===
- Edele, Mark. "Fighting Russia's History Wars: Vladimir Putin and the Codification of World War II". History and Memory (2017) 29#2:90-124
- Havlat, Denis. "Western Aid for the Soviet Union During World War II: Part I". Journal of Slavic Military Studies 30.2 (2017): 290–320.
  - Havlat, Denis. "Western Aid for the Soviet Union During World War II: Part II". Journal of Slavic Military Studies 30.4 (2017): 561–601. Argues the supplies made a decisive contribution to Soviet victory, despite denials by Stalinist historians.
- Uldricks, Teddy J. "War, Politics and Memory: Russian Historians Reevaluate the Origins of World War II". History and Memory 21#2 (2009), pp. 60–82. JSTOR 10.2979/his.2009.21.2.60. Historiography.
- Weiner, Amir. "The making of a dominant myth: The Second World War and the construction of political identities within the Soviet polity." Russian Review 55.4 (1996): 638–660. JSTOR 131868.
