= Oblasts of the Soviet Union =

Administrative unit in the Soviet Union

The oblasts of the Soviet Union were second-level administrative units of the Soviet Union, and first-level entities of the republics of the Soviet Union.

== Terminology ==
Oblast is a Slavic term that exists in the Russian language. Russian was official in all republics along with national languages of other republics.

== By location ==
=== Baltic region ===
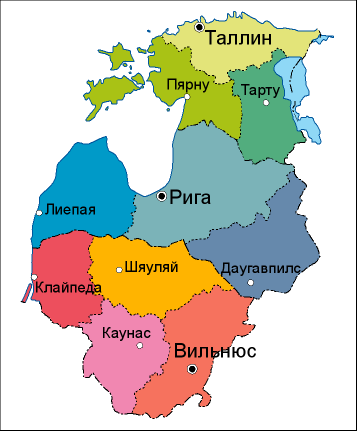

In the 1950s there were 10 oblasts in the three Baltic republics.

- 1953-04-28 Law on abolition of Pärnu, Tallinn and Tartu oblasts (Estonia)
- 1953-04-25 Law on abolition of Riga, Daugavpils and Liepāja oblasts (Latvia)
- 1953-05-28 Law on abolition of Vilnius, Kaunas, Klaipėda and Šiauliai oblasts (Lithuania)

=== Transcaucasian region ===
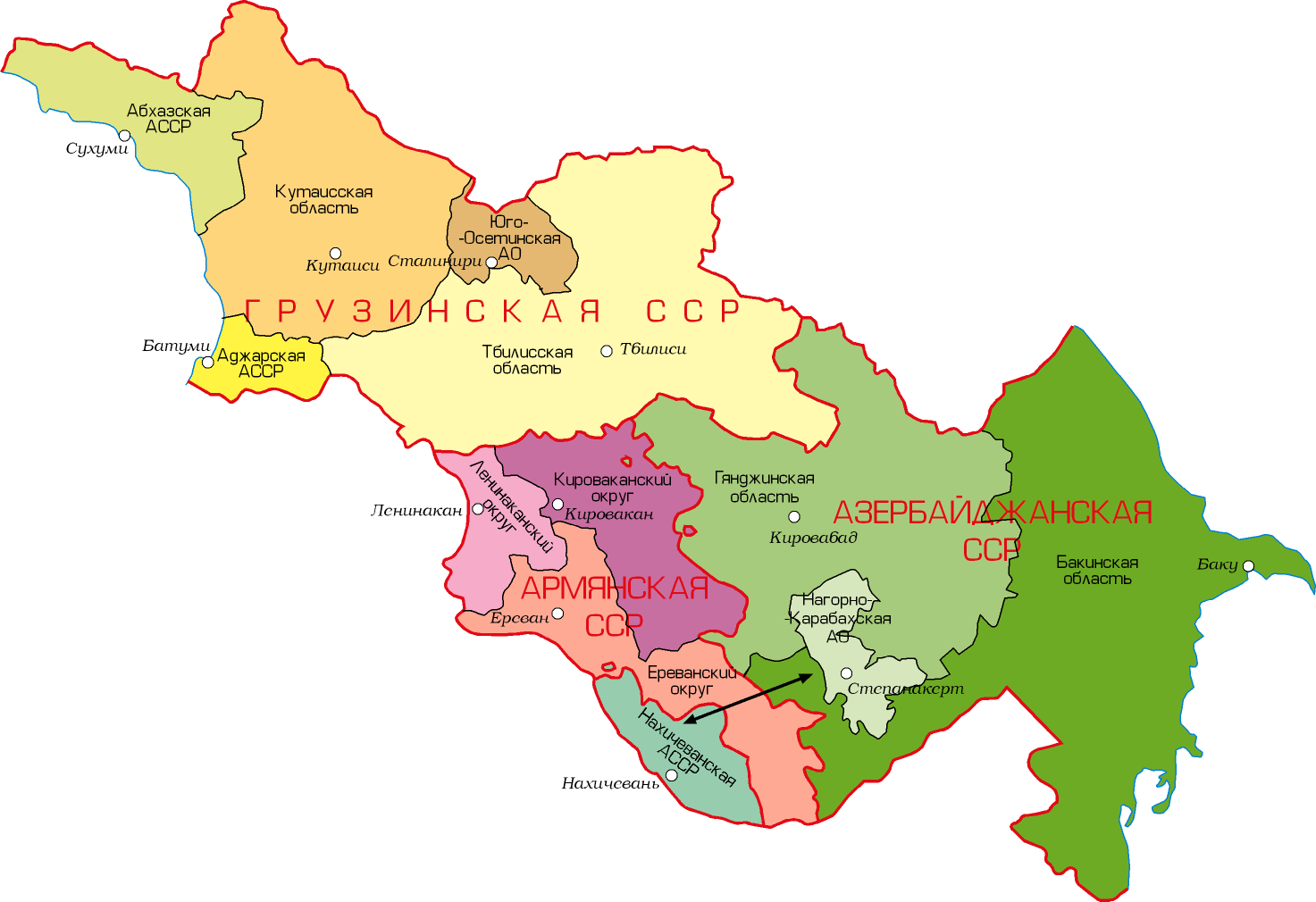

In the 1950s there were 4 oblasts in two of the three Transcaucasian republics (only in Azerbaijan and Georgia).

- 1953-04-23 Law on abolition of Baku and Ganja oblasts (Azerbaijan)
- 1953-04-23 Law on abolition of Kutaisi and Tbilisi oblasts (Georgia)

== List ==
Name in English	Name in Russian	Republic	Established	Dissolved
Pärnu Oblast	Пярнуская область (ru)	Estonian SSR	1952-05-10	1953-04-28
Tallinn Oblast	Таллинская область (ru)	Estonian SSR	1952-05-10	1953-04-28
Tartu Oblast	Тартуская область (ru)	Estonian SSR	1952-05-10	1953-04-28
Riga Oblast	Рижская область (ru)	Latvian SSR	1952-04-08	1953-04-25
Daugavpils Oblast	Даугавпилсская область (ru)	Latvian SSR	1952-04-08	1953-04-25
Liepāja Oblast	Лиепайская область (ru)	Latvian SSR	1952-04-08	1953-04-25
Šiauliai Oblast	Шяуляйская область (ru)	Lithuanian SSR	1950-06-20	1953-05-28
Klaipėda Oblast	Клайпедская область (ru)	Lithuanian SSR	1950-06-20	1953-05-28
Vilnius Oblast	Вильнюсская область (ru)	Lithuanian SSR	1950-06-20	1953-05-28
Kaunas Oblast	Каунасская область (ru)	Lithuanian SSR	1950-06-20	1953-05-28
Baku Oblast	Бакинская область (ru)	Azerbaijan SSR	1952-04-03	1953-04-23
Ganja Oblast	Гянджинская область (ru)	Azerbaijan SSR	1952-04-03	1953-04-23
Kutaisi Oblast	Кутаисская область (ru)	Georgian SSR	1951-11-05	1953-04-23
Tbilisi Oblast	Тбилисская область (ru)	Georgian SSR	1951-11-05	1953-04-23
Central Black Earth Oblast		RSFSR	1928-05-14	1934-06-13
Chita Oblast		RSFSR	1937-09-26	(Note: Dissolved in 2008 as an oblast of Russia)
Crimean Oblast		RSFSR	1945-06-30	1954-02-19
Crimean Oblast		Ukrainian SSR	1954-02-19	1991-02-12
East Siberian Oblast		RSFSR	1936-12-05	1937-09-26
Grozny Oblast		RSFSR	1944-03-07	1957-01-09
Irkutsk Oblast		RSFSR	1937-09-26	N/A (Note: Still exists)
Kuban-Black Sea Oblast		RSFSR	1920-03-18	1924-02-13
Northern Oblast (1936–37)		RSFSR	1936-12-05	1937-09-23
Ural Oblast		RSFSR	1923-11-03	1934-01-17
Velikiye Luki Oblast		RSFSR	1944-08-23	1957-10-02
Western Oblast		RSFSR	1929-10-1	1937-09-27

== See also ==
- Oblasts of Russia
- Oblasts of the Russian Empire
- Oblast
