= Ganja Oblast =

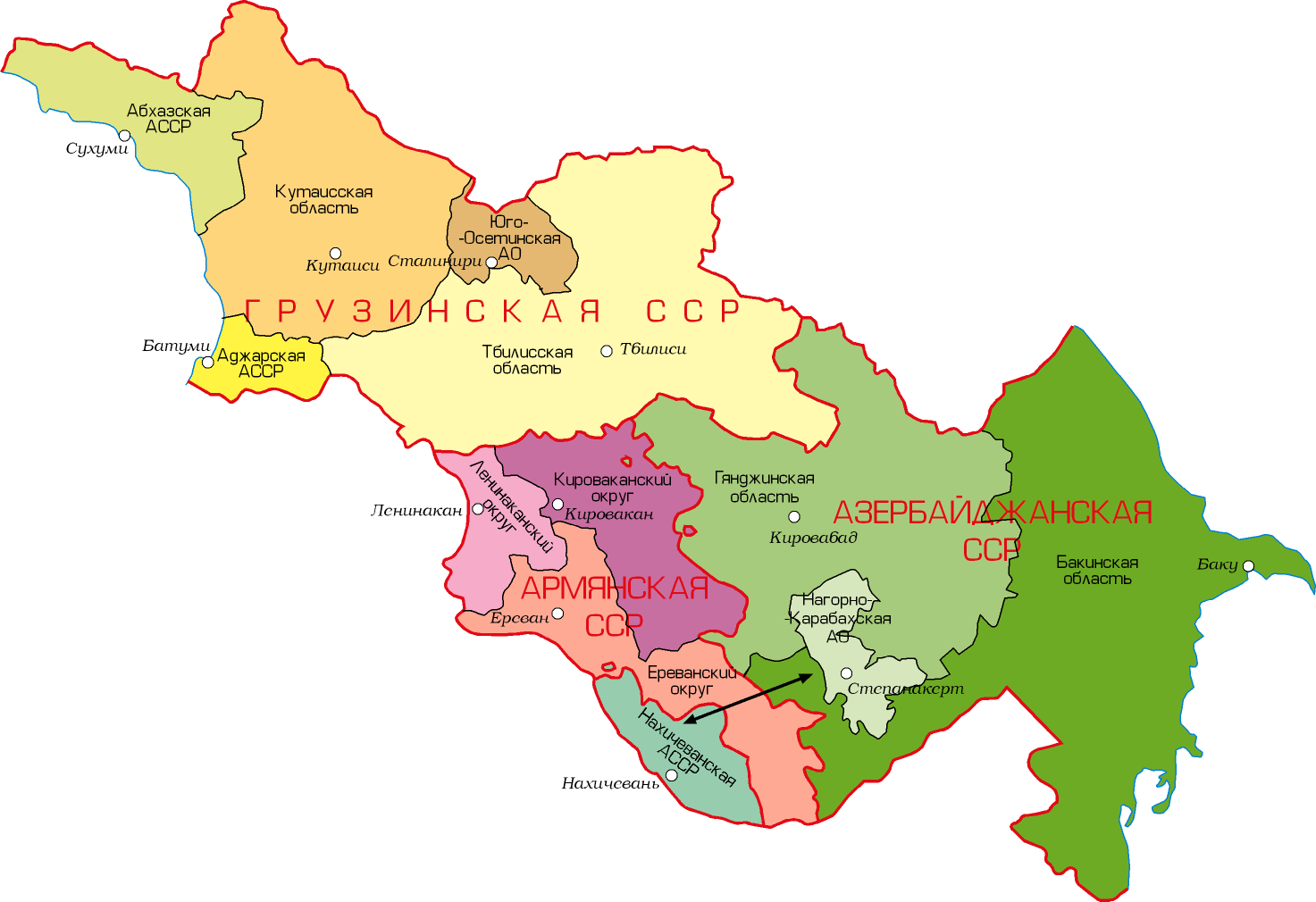
Map of the administrative structure of Transcaucasia in 1952-1953

Ganja Oblast was an administrative-territorial unit of the Azerbaijan SSR that existed in 1952 and 1953. The administrative center was the city of Kirovabad. Ganja Oblast is now a region in Azerbaijan, which includes the Agdash, Agstafa, Barda, Dashkasan, Gadabay, Goranboy, Khanlar, Qazakh, Samukh, Shamkir, and Yevlakh rayons.

== History ==
Gäncä became an important centre of trade, but in 1231 it was again leveled, this time by the Mongols. Captured in 1606 by the Persians, it became the centre of the Gäncä khanate. Ganja Oblast (along with Baku Oblast) was formed on April 3, 1952, as part of an experiment to introduce regional divisions within the union republics of Transcaucasia. The Ganja region was located in the western part of the republic and was divided into 28 districts: Aghdam, Agdash, Aghjabedinsky, Akstafa, Barda, Belokansky, Vartashensky, Geokchay, Dostafursky, Yevlakh, Zakatala, Zardobsky, Kazakh, Kasum-Ismailovsky, Kakhsky, Gadabay, Kalbajar, Kutkashensky, Mir-Bashir, Nukha, Samukh, Safaraliev, Tauz, Ujar, Khaldan, Khanlar, Shamkhor and Shahumyan.

After one year, the experiment was declared unsuccessful, and the region was abolished by decree of the Presidium of the Supreme Soviet of the USSR April 23, 1953.
