= Chechen National Okrug =

Former okrug in the USSR

Chechen National Okrug (Russian: Чеченский национальный округ, romanized: Chechensky natsional'nyy okrug, Chechen: Нохчийн къаьмнийн гуо, romanized: Noxçiyn q̇ämniyn guo) was an administrative division (okrug) of the early Russian SFSR, one of the seven national okrugs into which the Mountain Autonomous Soviet Socialist Republic was divided. It was established on January 21, 1920 and existed until November 30, 1922, when it was separated from the Mountain ASSR as Chechen Autonomous Oblast.
