= Autonomous oblast =

Administrative division in Russia, Tajikistan and the Soviet Union

An autonomous oblast (Russian: Автономная область (АО)) is an autonomous form of an oblast (administrative-territorial structure) in the USSR. Of the post-Soviet states, autonomous oblasts currently exist only in Russia (the Jewish Autonomous Oblast) and Tajikistan (the Gorno-Badakhshan).

There were autonomous oblasts of the Soviet Union and later some federal subjects of Russia were autonomous oblasts: the one remaining is the Jewish Autonomous Oblast.

Eastern Rumelia was an autonomous province (oblast in Bulgarian, one of its official languages) of the Ottoman Empire. Serb Autonomous Regions were also known as autonomous oblasts.

== Autonomous Oblasts in the Soviet Union ==
=== Azerbaijani Soviet Socialist Republic ===
- Nagorno-Karabakh Autonomous Oblast (1923–1991)

=== Georgian Soviet Socialist Republic ===
- South Ossetian Autonomous Oblast (1922–1990)

=== Russian Soviet Federative Socialist Republic ===
- Adyghe Autonomous Oblast (1922–1991)
- Buryat-Mongol Autonomous Oblast (1921–1923)
- Chechen Autonomous Oblast (1922–1934)
- Checheno-Ingush Autonomous Oblast (1934–1936)
- Cherkess Autonomous Oblast (1928–1957)
- Chuvash Autonomous Oblast (1920–1925)
- Gorno-Altai Autonomous Oblast (1922–1990)
- Ingush Autonomous Oblast (1922–1934)
- Jewish Autonomous Oblast (1934-1991)
- Kabardino-Balkarian Autonomous Oblast (1922–1936)
- Kalmyk Autonomous Oblast (1920–1935, 1957–1958)
- Karachay Autonomous Oblast (1926–1943)
- Karachay-Cherkess Autonomous Oblast (1922–1926, 1957–1991)
- Karakalpak Autonomous Oblast (1925–1932)
- Kara-Kirghiz Autonomous Oblast (1924–1936)
- Khakas Autonomous Oblast (1930–1991)
- Komi (Zyryan) Autonomous Oblast (1921–1936)
- Mari Autonomous Oblast (1920–1936)
- Mongol-Buryat Autonomous Oblast (1922–1923)
- Mordovian Autonomous Oblast (1930–1934)
- North Ossetian Autonomous Oblast (1924–1936)
- Tuvan Autonomous Oblast (1944–1961)
- Udmurt Autonomous Oblast (1920–1934)

=== Tajik Soviet Socialist Republic ===
- Gorno-Badakhshan Autonomous Oblast (1925–1991)

=== Ukrainian Soviet Socialist Republic ===
- Moldavian Autonomous Oblast (1924)

== See also ==
- Autonomous republics and oblasts of the Soviet Union
