= Autonomous republics and oblasts of the Soviet Union =

Administrative units within the Soviet Union

Map of the types of the subdivisions as of 1983, with autonomous republics shown in orange and autonomous oblasts in blue.

An autonomous republic of the Union of Soviet Socialist Republics, styled Autonomous Soviet Socialist Republic (ASSR, Russian: автономная советская социалистическая республика, АССР, romanized: avtonomnaya sovetskaya sotsialisticheskaya respublika), was a type of administrative unit created for certain ethnic groups to be the titular nations of. The ASSRs had a status lower than the constituent union republics of the USSR, but higher than the autonomous oblasts and the autonomous okrugs.

The level of political, administrative and cultural autonomy ASSRs enjoyed within the USSR varied with time—it was most substantial in the 1920s (Korenizatsiya), in the 1950s after the death of Joseph Stalin, and in the Brezhnev Era (1964–1982). In the Russian SFSR, for example, the various chairmen of the governments of the ASSRs were officially members of the Government of the Russian SFSR.

Autonomous oblasts of the Soviet Union were administrative units created for a number of smaller nations, which were given autonomy within the fifteen republics of the USSR.

== History ==
Art. 11 of the 1918 Constitution of the RSFSR stated that autonomous regional unions "distinguished by their distinctive way of life and ethnic composition" may be formed. With explicit reference to the article, the Council of People's Commissars of the RSFSR passed a decree on October 19, 1918 to establish the Labour Commune of Volga Germans, a precursor to the future autonomous republics and oblasts. The Karelian Labor Commune was later established in 1920. The labor commune as a type of administrative division did not receive further consolidation of legal status due to the transformation of both of them into ASSRs in 1923.

While the 1924 Constitution of the Soviet Union simply mentioned the existence of autonomous republics and oblasts, the 1925 Constitution of the RSFSR codified them as part of the power structure. The 1936 Constitution of the Soviet Union would follow suit while also listing all existing autonomous units in Art. 22 to 29. The 1977 Constitution of the Soviet Union renamed national okrugs to autonomous okrugs and defined them alongside the autonomous oblasts, albeit without listing each of them.

=== Parade of sovereignties ===
Unlike for the union republics, the Constitution did not specify a right to disaffiliate from the Union for autonomous units. On April 3, 1990, a law was passed which stated that when a union republic was voting to leave the Soviet Union, autonomous republics, autonomous oblasts, and autonomous okrugs had the right, by means of a referendum, to independently resolve whether they would stay in the USSR or leave with the seceding union republic, as well as broader rights to raise the issue of their state-legal status. On April 26, 1990, a law was passed where autonomous republics were considered "constituent entities of the federation, the USSR".

In the months following the proposal of New Union Treaty by Gorbachev during the Communist Party Congress in July 1990, most of autonomous republics declared sovereignty and expressed the desire to be a party to the new treaty during the parade of sovereignties. Most of them participated in the Novo-Ogaryovo process to draft the treaty, and the status of former autonomous republics was a major point of contention among participants. On July 12, 1991, the Supreme Soviet passed the resolution "About the draft treaty on Union of Sovereign States" to state its stance on the matter that each of "the subjects of the federation, including both the sovereign states - the republics - and the republics incorporated within them on a treaty or constitutional basis" "possesses the right to sign the text of the Union Treaty". As a compromise, the final draft of the treaty allowed a state to join the Union as a part of another state, but the autonomous republics were not invited to sign it on July 23. The effort was ultimately futile due to the August Coup.

== Russian SFSR ==
The 1978 Constitution of the RSFSR recognized sixteen autonomous republics and five autonomous oblasts within the RSFSR. The autonomous oblasts were subordinated to the krais; this clause was removed in the December 15, 1990, revision, when it was specified that the autonomous oblasts were to be directly subordinated to the Russian SFSR.

As most autonomous republics and oblasts declared self-promotion to Soviet Socialist Republics during the parade of sovereignties, Art. 71 and 72 of the constitution were amended on May 24, 1991 to recognize its autonomous republics as SSRs; it was further amended on July 3 to promote four of its five autonomous oblasts to SSRs. These divisions then became republics of Russia while the Jewish Autonomous Oblast retained its status in Russia.

=== Autonomous republics in 1978 ===
Most autonomous republics existed as autonomous oblasts before promotion.

Autonomous oblast name	Autonomous oblast established	Emblem	Autonomous republic name	Flag	Capital	Official languages	Autonomous republic established	Area (km^{2)}	Post-Soviet republics of Russia
—N/a			Bashkir Autonomous Soviet Socialist Republic		Ufa	Bashkir, Russian	1919	143,600	Bashkortostan
—N/a			Buryat Autonomous Soviet Socialist Republic		Ulan-Ude	Buryat, Russian	1923 (Note: 1923–1958: Buryat-Mongol ASSR)	69,857	Buryatia
Checheno-Ingush Autonomous Oblast	1934		Checheno-Ingush Autonomous Soviet Socialist Republic		Grozny	Chechen, Ingush, Russian	1936 (Note: Dissolved in 1944.); 1957	19,300	Chechnya; Ingushetia
Chuvash Autonomous Oblast	1920		Chuvash Autonomous Soviet Socialist Republic		Cheboksary	Chuvash, Russian	1925	18,300	Chuvashia
—N/a			Dagestan Autonomous Soviet Socialist Republic		Makhachkala	Aghul, Avar, Azerbaijani, Chechen, Kumyk, Lezgian, Lak, Nogai, Tabasaran, Tat, Russian	1921	50,300	Dagestan
Kabardino-Balkarian Autonomous Oblast	1921 (Note: 1921–1922: Kabardin Autonomous Oblast)		Kabardino-Balkarian Autonomous Soviet Socialist Republic		Nalchik	Kabardian, Karachay-Balkar, Russian	1936 (Note: 1944-1957: Kabardin ASSR)	12,500	Kabardino-Balkaria
Kalmyk Autonomous Oblast	1920; 1957		Kalmyk Autonomous Soviet Socialist Republic		Elista	Kalmyk Oirat, Russian	1935 (Note: Dissolved in 1943.); 1958	76,100	Kalmykia
Karelian Labor Commune	1920		Karelian Autonomous Soviet Socialist Republic		Petrozavodsk	Finnish (1956-1980s), Russian	1923 (Note: Promoted to a union republic as Karelo-Finnish SSR from 1940 to 1956.)	147,000	Karelia
Komi (Zyryan) Autonomous Oblast	1923		Komi Autonomous Soviet Socialist Republic		Syktyvkar	Komi, Russian	1936	415,900	Komi Republic
Mari Autonomous Oblast	1920		Mari Autonomous Soviet Socialist Republic		Yoshkar-Ola	Mari (Meadow and Hill variants), Russian	1936	23,200	Mari El
Mordovian Autonomous Oblast	1930		Mordovian Autonomous Soviet Socialist Republic		Saransk	Erzya, Moksha, Russian	1934	26,200	Mordovia
North Ossetian Autonomous Oblast	1924		North Ossetian Autonomous Soviet Socialist Republic		Ordzhonikidze	Ossetian, Russian	1936	8,000	North Ossetia
—N/a			Tatar Autonomous Soviet Socialist Republic		Kazan	Tatar, Russian	1920	68,000	Tatarstan
Tuvan Autonomous Oblast	1944		Tuvan Autonomous Soviet Socialist Republic		Kyzyl	Tuvan, Russian	1961	170,500	Tuva
Udmurt Autonomous Oblast	1920 (Note: 1920–1932: Votyak Autonomous Oblast)		Udmurt Autonomous Soviet Socialist Republic		Izhevsk (Note: 1920–1921: Glazov)	Udmurt, Russian	1934	42,100	Udmurtia
—N/a			Yakut Autonomous Soviet Socialist Republic		Yakutsk	Yakut, Russian	1922	3,083,523	Sakha Republic

=== Autonomous oblasts in 1978 ===
Name	Capital	Established	Krai	Post-Soviet federal subjects of Russia
Adyghe Autonomous Oblast	Maykop	1922 (Note: 1922-1928: Adyghe (Cherkess) AO)	Krasnodar Krai	Adygea
Gorno-Altai Autonomous Oblast	Gorno-Altaysk	1922 (Note: 1922-1948: Oyrot AO)	Altai Krai	Altai
Jewish Autonomous Oblast	Birobidzhan	1934	Khabarovsk Krai	Jewish Autonomous Oblast
Karachay-Cherkess Autonomous Oblast	Cherkessk	1922 (Note: Split in 1926 and reestablished in 1957.)	Stavropol Krai	Karachay-Cherkessia
Khakas Autonomous Oblast	Abakan	1930	Krasnoyarsk Krai	Khakassia

=== Early divisions ===
Other autonomous republics also existed within the RSFSR at earlier points of the Soviet history:

Predecessor name	Predecessor established	Emblem	Autonomous republic name	Flag	Capital	Titular nationality	Autonomous republic established	Dissolved	Area (km^{2})	Soviet successors
—N/a			Crimean Autonomous Soviet Socialist Republic		Simferopol	Crimean Tatars	1921	1945	26,860	Crimean Oblast
—N/a			Mountain Autonomous Soviet Socialist Republic		Vladikavkaz	Balkars, Chechens, Ingush, Kabardians, Karachays, Ossetians, Terek Cossacks	1921	1924	74,000	Karachay-Cherkess AO; Kabardino-Balkarian AO; Chechen AO; North Ossetian AO; Ingush AO
Turkestan Soviet Federative Republic	1918		Turkestan Autonomous Soviet Socialist Republic		Tashkent	Turkic peoples (Uzbeks, Kazakhs, Kyrgyz, Tajiks, Turkmens)	1920	1924		Uzbek SSR; Turkmen SSR; Tajik ASSR; Kara-Kirghiz AO; Karakalpak AO
Labour Commune of Volga Germans	1918		Volga German Autonomous Soviet Socialist Republic		Engels (Note: 1918-1919: Saratov 1919-1923: Marxstadt)	Volga Germans	1923	1941	27,400	Saratov Oblast; Stalingrad Oblast

These autonomous oblasts existed at earlier points of the Soviet history before they were merged:

Name	Capital	Years of membership	Soviet successor
Buryat-Mongol Autonomous Oblast	Chita	1921–1923 (Note: Under Far Eastern Republic before 1923.)	Buryat-Mongol Autonomous Soviet Socialist Republic
Mongol-Buryat Autonomous Oblast	Irkutsk	1922–1923	Buryat-Mongol Autonomous Soviet Socialist Republic
Chechen Autonomous Oblast	Grozny	1922–1934	Checheno-Ingush Autonomous Oblast
Ingush Autonomous Oblast	Vladikavkaz	1924–1934	Checheno-Ingush Autonomous Oblast
Cherkess Autonomous Oblast	Cherkessk	1928–1957 (Note: 1926–1928: Cherkess National Okrug)	Karachay-Cherkess Autonomous Oblast
Karachay Autonomous Oblast	Karachayevsk	1926–1943	Karachay-Cherkess Autonomous Oblast

== Ukrainian SSR ==
The Crimea Oblast was transferred to the Ukrainian SSR jurisdiction on 19 February 1954 and promoted to the ASSR status following a referendum held on January 20, 1991 (now the Autonomous Republic of Crimea / Republic of Crimea, territory disputed between Ukraine and the Russian Federation).

Emblem	Name	Flag	Years of membership	Capital	Titular nationality	Area (km^{2})	Post-Soviet successors
	Crimean Autonomous Soviet Socialist Republic		1991	Simferopol	Crimean Tatars	26,860	Autonomous Republic of Crimea

The Moldavian Autonomous Oblast was established in 1924 under Ukrainian SSR and became an autonomous republic (Moldavian ASSR) only months after its formation, a union republic (Moldavian SSR) in 1940, and now the independent Moldova. However, de facto, almost all areas of the original oblast are controlled either by Ukraine or by Transnistria.

== South Caucasus ==
One autonomous republic and both of the two autonomous oblasts in the South Caucasus region became self-declared break-away states during the dissolution of the Soviet Union:

Emblem	Name	Flag	Capital	Official languages	Established	Independence	Area (km^{2)}	Soviet Socialist Republic	Post-Soviet subjects
	Abkhaz Autonomous Soviet Socialist Republic		Sukhumi	Abkhazian, Georgian, Russian	1931 (Note: 1921-1931: SSR Abkhazia)	1992	8,600	Georgian SSR	Abkhazia
	Adjarian Autonomous Soviet Socialist Republic		Batumi	Georgian, Russian	1921	-	2,880	Georgian SSR	Adjara (Georgia)
-	Nagorno-Karabakh Autonomous Oblast	-	Stepanakert		1923	1991		Azerbaijan SSR	Artsakh
	Nakhichevan Autonomous Soviet Socialist Republic		Nakhichevan	Azerbaijani, Russian	1921	1990	5,500	Azerbaijan SSR	Nakhchivan (Azerbaijan)
-	South Ossetian Autonomous Oblast	-	Tskhinvali		1922	1990		Georgian SSR	South Ossetia

== Central Asia ==
Autonomous oblast name	Emblem	Autonomous republic name	Flag	Capital	Official languages	Autonomous oblast established	Autonomous republic established	Area (km^{2)}	Soviet Socialist Republic	Post-Soviet subjects
Karakalpak Autonomous Oblast		Karakalpak Autonomous Soviet Socialist Republic		Nukus	Karakalpak (1956-1980s), Russian	1925	1932	165,000	Kazakh ASSR (1925-1930); Russian SFSR (1930-1936); Uzbek SSR (1936-1991)	Karakalpakstan (Uzbekistan)
Gorno-Badakhshan Autonomous Oblast	—N/a			Khorog		1925	—N/a		Tajik SSR	Gorno-Badakhshan (Tajikistan)

== Divisions promoted to union republics ==
Some divisions existed at earlier points of the Soviet history were promoted into full union republics of the Soviet Union.

Autonomous oblast name	Autonomous oblast established	Emblem	Autonomous republic name	Flag	Capital	Titular nationality	Autonomous republic established	Union Republics status	Population	Area (km^{2})	Soviet Socialist Republic	Soviet successor
—N/a			Kazakh Autonomous Socialist Soviet Republic		Alma-Ata	Kazakhs	1920 (Note: 1920-1925: Kirghiz ASSR)	1936	6,503,000 (1926)	2,960,000	Russian SFSR	Kazakh SSR
Kirghiz Autonomous Oblast	1924 (Note: 1924–1925:Kara-Kirghiz Autonomous Oblast)		Kirghiz Autonomous Socialist Soviet Republic		Frunze	Kyrgyz	1926	1936	993,000 (1926)	196,129	Russian SFSR	Kirghiz SSR
Moldavian Autonomous Oblast	1924		Moldavian Autonomous Soviet Socialist Republic		Tiraspol (de facto)	Moldovans	1924	1940	599,150 (1939)	8,288	Ukrainian SSR	Moldavian SSR
—N/a			Tajik Autonomous Soviet Socialist Republic		Dushanbe	Tajiks	1924	1929	740,000 (1924)		Uzbek SSR	Tajik SSR

Karelian ASSR was promoted to the Karelo-Finnish Soviet Socialist Republic in 1940 but demoted back in 1956.

== See also ==
- Emblems of the Autonomous Soviet Republics
- Autonomous okrugs of the Soviet Union
- National delimitation in the Soviet Union
- Republics of Russia
- Subdivisions of the Soviet Union
- Autonomous regions of China
