= Ingushetia (disambiguation) =

Ingushetia is a federal republic and subject of Russia.

Ingushetia may also refer to:

- Ingushetia (newspaper), weekly newspaper based in Magas
- Ingushskiy Okrug (1860–1870), an administrative division of the Terek Oblast within the Russian Empire
- Nazran Okrug (Mountain ASSR) (1921–1924), an administrative division of the Mountain ASSR within the Russian SFSR
- Ingush Autonomous Oblast (1924–1934), an administrative division of the Russian SFSR

== See also ==
- Ingush (disambiguation)
