= Rescue of Leningrad Jewish children in Beslenei =

The rescue of Leningrad Jewish children in Beslenei occurred in August 1942, in the aul of Beslenei, Cherkess Autonomous Oblast, Russian SFSR, USSR, when local Circassian villagers adopted evacuated children from a Leningrad orphanage, most of whom were Jewish, and managed to forge documents in order to prove to the Nazis that the children were of local descent.

The orphanage, on the Okhta River, was evacuated in April 1942 to Armavir, Armenia via the Road of Life on the icy Lake Ladoga. However, in August, the German offensive reached Caucasus, and it was decided to evacuate the orphanage to Abkhazia via Teberda and the Caucasus Range.

When carts with weakened children entered Beslenei, 40 km west from Cherkessk, the locals, fearing that the children could not survive the transfer via the range, offered to adopt them, especially as other villagers avoided adopting Jews due to possible punishment by the Nazis.

The local selsoviet chairman Sagid Shovgenov and kolkhoz chairman Khusin Lakhov arranged a meeting, where they decided to adopt 36 children and distribute food reserves among the adoptive parents. They also forged all documents in the village, referring to the adoptive families, as well as all documents of the children.

Soon, the Germans broke the front and occupied the territory. They met the evacuating orphanage in Teberda and massacred them. They learned that some of the children were staying in Beslenei and managed to find them. However, due to the forgery of all documents and activity of the village elder Murzabek Okhtov, who agreed to be appointed by the Nazis in the purpose to save the children, none were discovered. Okhtov managed to convince the local German administration that the denunciations reporting the children were false. During the five month occupation, only one teenager was killed, as he was accused of encroaching upon a German soldier's life.

After the Germans retreated, Okhtov was accused of collaboration with the Soviets. However, after two weeks of investigation, he was freed.

The majority of the children were sent to Stalingrad orphanage, although some remained in Beslenei.
