= North Ossetian Autonomous Oblast =

North Ossetian Autonomous Oblast Цӕгат Ирыстоны AО (Iron Ossetic) Северо-Осетинская АО (Russian)
- Autonomous oblast of the Russian SFSR
- 1924–1936
- Flag Emblem
- Capital: Ordzhonikidze (Vladikavkaz)
- Demonym: North Ossetian
- Population
  - 1926: 152,435
- Government
  - Type: Autonomous oblast
- History
  - Established: 1924
  - Disestablished: 1936
Preceded by	Succeeded by
Mountain Autonomous Soviet Socialist Republic	North Ossetian Autonomous Soviet Socialist Republic
- Today part of: Russia · North Ossetia–Alania

The North Ossetian Autonomous Oblast was an oblast which existed from 1924 until 1936. It was then established as the North Ossetian Autonomous Soviet Socialist Republic in 1936.

== History ==
The North Ossetian AO was formed on July 7, 1924 from the Ossetian okrug of the dissolved Mountain ASSR. The city of Vladikavkaz, which was not part of oblast but had the status of an autonomous city was designated both the North Ossetian and the Ingush Autonomous Oblast's capital.

On February 26, 1925, the AO was included in the North Caucasus Krai.

In 1931, Vladikavkaz was renamed Ordzhonikidze in honor of Sergo Ordzhonikidze.

On January 15, 1934, following the unification of the Ingush AO and the Chechen Autonomous Oblast into the Checheno-Ingush Autonomous Oblast, Ordzhonikidze became only the capital of North Ossetia and was thus merged into it.

With the adoption of a new Soviet Constitution on December 5, 1936, the North Ossetian AO was transformed into the North Ossetian ASSR.

== Administrative divisions ==
As of October 1, 1931, the autonomous oblast included 5 raions:

1. Alagiro-Ardonsky
2. Dzaudzhikausky
3. Digorsky
4. Pravoberezhny
5. Priterechny

== See also ==
- North Ossetian Regional Committee of the Communist Party of the Soviet Union
- North Ossetia-Alania
- South Ossetian Autonomous Oblast
