= Kabardino-Balkarian Autonomous Oblast =

Autonomous Region within the RSFSR

Kabardino-Balkarian Autonomous Oblast Кабардино-Балкарская АО (Russian) Къэбэрдей-Балъкъэр АО (Kabardian) Къабарты-Малкъар АО (Karachay-Balkar)
- Autonomous oblast of the Russian SFSR
- 1922–1936
- Capital: Nalchik
- Area
  - 1936: 12,470 km^{2} (4,810 sq mi)
- Population
  - 1936: 350,000
  - Type: Autonomous oblast
- Historical era: Interwar period
  - Formed as Kabardin Autonomous Oblast from Kabardin Okrug of Mountain ASSR: 1921
  - Merged with Balkarian Okrug of Mountain ASSR and renamed as Kabardino-Balkarian Autonomous Oblast: 16 January 1922
  - Became Kabardino-Balkarian ASSR: 5 December 1936
Preceded by	Succeeded by
Mountain ASSR	Kabardino-Balkarian ASSR

The Kabardino-Balkarian Autonomous Oblast was an autonomous oblast within the Kabardino-Balkaria region of the Soviet Union. The Oblast was formed in 1921 as the Kabardin Autonomous Oblast before becoming the Kabardino-Balkarian Autonomous Oblast on 16 January 1922. On 16 October 1924 it became part of the North Caucasus Krai, but was separated from it on 5 December 1936, elevated in status and renamed the Kabardino-Balkarian Autonomous Soviet Socialist Republic.

== See also ==
- History of Kabardino-Balkaria
- Kabardino-Balkarian Regional Committee of the Communist Party of the Soviet Union
