= Kabardino-Balkarian Regional Committee of the Communist Party of the Soviet Union =

The First Secretary of the Kabardino–Balkarian regional branch of the Communist Party of the Soviet Union was the position of highest authority in the Kabardino-Balkarian AO (1921–1936), Kabardino-Balkarian ASSR (1936–1944, 1957–1991) and the Kabardin ASSR (1944–1957) in the Russian SFSR of the Soviet Union. The position was created in 1921, and abolished in August 1991. The First Secretary was a de facto appointed position usually by the Politburo or the General Secretary himself.

== List of First Secretaries of the Kabardino–Balkar Communist Party ==
| Name | Term of Office | | Life years |
| Name | Start | End | Life years |
First Secretaries of the Communist Party
| Boleslav Pavlovich | 1921 | March 1923 | |
| Stepan Mikhaylov | March 1923 | April 1924 | |
| Pavel Leshchynski | April 1924 | May 1925 | 1895–1938 |
| Ivan Borovitsky | May 1925 | July 1928 | 1894–? |
| I.I. Povalyukhin | July 1928 | September 1928 | |
| V.M. Dulin | October 1928 | March 1929 | |
| Kazgeri Maksidov | March 1929 | May 1929 | 1893–1937 |
| Fyodorov | May 1929 | January 1930 | |
| Sevastyanov | February 1930 | May 1930 | |
| Betal Kalmykov | May 1930 | November 13, 1938 | 1893–1940 |
| Aleksandr Kudryavtsev | November 13, 1938 | December 1939 | 1906–? |
| Zuber Kumekhov | December 1939 | April 10, 1944 | 1910–1988 |
| Nikolay Mazin | April 10, 1944 | May 1949 | 1909–? |
| Vasily Babich | May 1949 | November 1956 | 1912–1988 |
| Timbora Malbakhov | November 1956 | October 19, 1985 | 1917–1999 |
| Yevgeny Yeliseyev | October 19, 1985 | February 21, 1990 | 1936– |
| Valery Kokov | February 21, 1990 | September 1, 1990 | 1941–2005 |
| Boris Zumakulov | September 1, 1990 | August 1991 | 1940– |

== See also ==
- Kabardino-Balkarian Autonomous Oblast
- Kabardino-Balkarian Autonomous Soviet Socialist Republic

== Sources ==
- World Statesmen.org
