= Temirgoevsky District =

- Темиргоевский район
- Country: Soviet Union

Temirgoevsky District (Russian: Темиргоевский район) is an administrative-territorial unit within the territory of Azov-Black Sea and Krasnodar, which existed in 1934–1953. Center of district was Temirgoevsky village.

== History ==
Temirgoevsky District was established on December 28, 1934, as part of the Azov-Black Sea Territory. Later, Temirgoevsky district became part of the Krasnodar Territory on September 13, 1937, and was abolished on August 22, 1953.
