= Subdivisions of the Soviet Union =

The Soviet Union had several kinds of country subdivisions:

Soviet Union
Russian SFSR	Other republics
Autonomous republics	Oblasts	Krais
Autonomous republics	Oblasts	Autonomous oblasts
Autonomous okrugs	Autonomous oblasts

Types of the subdivisions: Republics with no subdivisions Oblasts Krais/Districts ASSRs (autonomous republics) Autonomous oblasts Autonomous okrugs

Administrative divisions of the Soviet Union by republic
Republic	Autonomous republics	Oblasts	Krais	Autonomous oblasts	Autonomous okrugs
Armenian SSR					
Azerbaijan SSR	1			1	
Byelorussian SSR		6			
Estonian SSR					
Georgian SSR	2			1	
Karelo-Finnish SSR (1940–1956)					
Kazakh SSR		19			
Kirghiz SSR		4–7			
Latvian SSR					
Lithuanian SSR					
Moldavian SSR		7			
Russian SFSR	16	49	6	5	10
Tajik SSR		2–3		1	
Transcaucasian SFSR (1922–1936)	3				
Turkmen SSR		5			
Ukrainian SSR		25			
Uzbek SSR	1	12			
