= History of Kabardino-Balkaria =

The Republic of Kabardino-Balkaria is a federal subject of Russia (a republic), located in the Caucasus region.

== Early history ==
As with other parts of the Caucasus, the area that is now known as Kabardino-Balkaria has been inhabited for thousands of years. The origins of its inhabitants are intrinsically tied with its neighboring republics, Adygea and Karachay-Cherkessia. See Circassia.

It is known that modern-day Circassians also called Kassogs were inhabiting that area since at least the 6th century BCE, then known as Zichia. Balkars were part of Alania and one of the Vainakh tribes, who were influenced by Turkic culture after the Mongol invasion's split of the lowlands of Nakh tribes and adopted the language. Also genetically they are closely related to Chechens and Ingush.

The region came under the control of the Mongols between 1242 and 1295. It passed into the hands of the Georgians from 1295 to around 1427 when it was incorporated into a unified Circassian Kingdom, it remained part of the Kingdom until King Inal's death in 1453 where afterwards it remained independent until somewhere between 1769 and 1830 with the Russo-Circassian war and subsequent genocide when it fell under Russian occupation. It was eventually annexed by Russia. See Kabardia.

== Russian and Soviet rule ==
Kabardia gained independence briefly between 1739 and 1774, before being annexed by Russia under the terms of the Treaty of Küçük Kaynarca. Balkaria was annexed in 1827. The Russians established a number of forts in the region, notably at Nalchik (the republic's present-day capital), to secure their control over it. A significant number of Russians – many of Cossack descent – also settled there.

During the Russian Civil War, the region became part of the anti-communist South-Eastern League (1917–1918), then joined the Mountain Peoples’ Autonomous Republic in 1921. On September 1, 1921, with the emergence of the Soviet Union, the territories were organized into the Kabardin Autonomous Oblast. The region's name was changed to the Kabardino-Balkar Autonomous Oblast the following year, and on December 5, 1936, it was elevated in status and named Kabardino-Balkar Autonomous Soviet Socialist Republic.

In 1944, Soviet leader Joseph Stalin falsely accused the Balkars of collaborating with Nazi Germany and deported the entire population. Their name was deleted from the territory, which was renamed the Kabardin ASSR. The Balkar population was only allowed to return in 1957 at which point its pre-war name was restored.

== Post-Soviet history ==
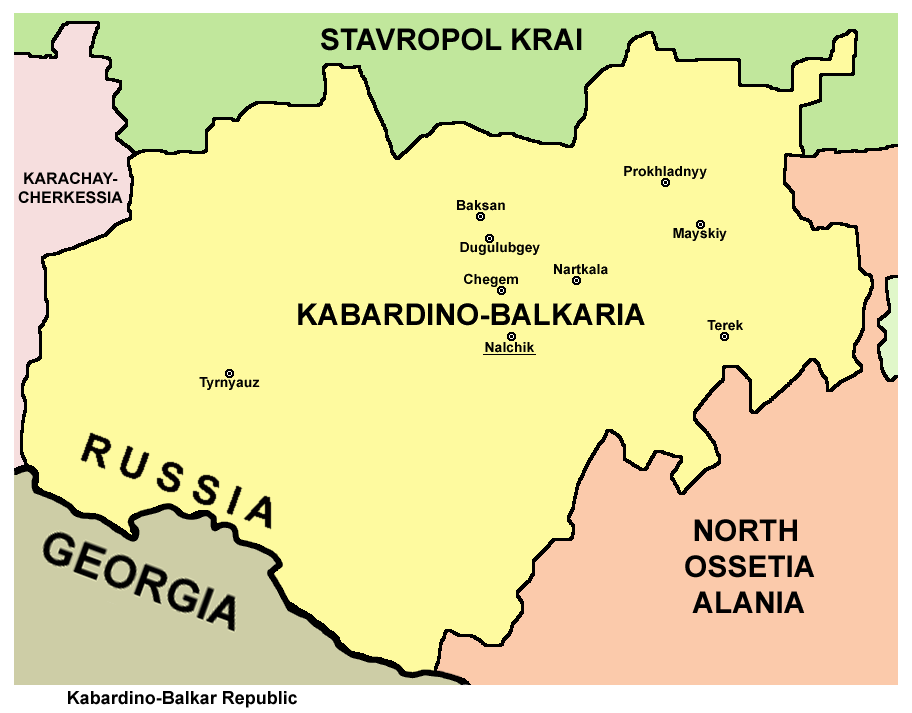
Modern Kabardino-Balkaria

Kabardino-Balkaria became a full republic in 1991 and in March 1992 became one of the constituent republics of the Russian Federation.

The republic's economy was very hard hit by the fall of the Soviet Union and the outbreak of war in neighboring Georgia and nearby Chechnya. The instability produced by the conflicts led to a collapse in tourism in the region and produced an unemployment level estimated to be as high as 90%. The republic's mainly Muslim population has become increasingly radicalised by the region's instability. In October 2005, Kabardino-Balkaria's capital Nalchik was the site of fighting after an attack on the city by Chechen militants. On 1 July 1994 Kabardino-Balkaria became the second republic after Tatarstan to sign a power-sharing agreement with the federal government, granting it autonomy. This agreement would be abolished on 8 August 2002.
