= Khakas Autonomous Oblast =

Autonomous oblast of the Soviet Union

Khakas Autonomous Oblast Хакасская автономная область (Russian) Хакас автоном облазы (Khakas)
- Autonomous oblast of the Russian SFSR
- 1930–1991
- Capital: Abakan
  - Type: Autonomous Oblast
- History
  - Established: 1930
  - Disestablished: 1991
Succeeded by
Khakassia

The Khakas Autonomous Oblast (Russian: Хакасская автономная область, Khakas: Хакас автоном облазы, romanized: Xakas avtonom oblazı), abbreviated as Khakas AO (Russian: Хакасская АО, Khakas: Хакас АО, romanized: Xakas AO) or KhAO (Russian: ХАО, Khakas: ХАО, romanized: XAO), was part of the 1934 created Krasnoyarsk Krai within the Russian SFSR, Soviet Union.

Until 1991, Khakas Autonomous Oblast was administratively subordinated to Krasnoyarsk Krai. In July 1991, it was elevated in status to that of an autonomous Soviet socialist republic, and in February 1992 it became the Republic of Khakassia.
