= Azov-Black Sea Krai =

Azov-Black Sea Krai Азово-Черноморский край
- Krai of Russian Soviet Federative Socialist Republic
- 1934–1937
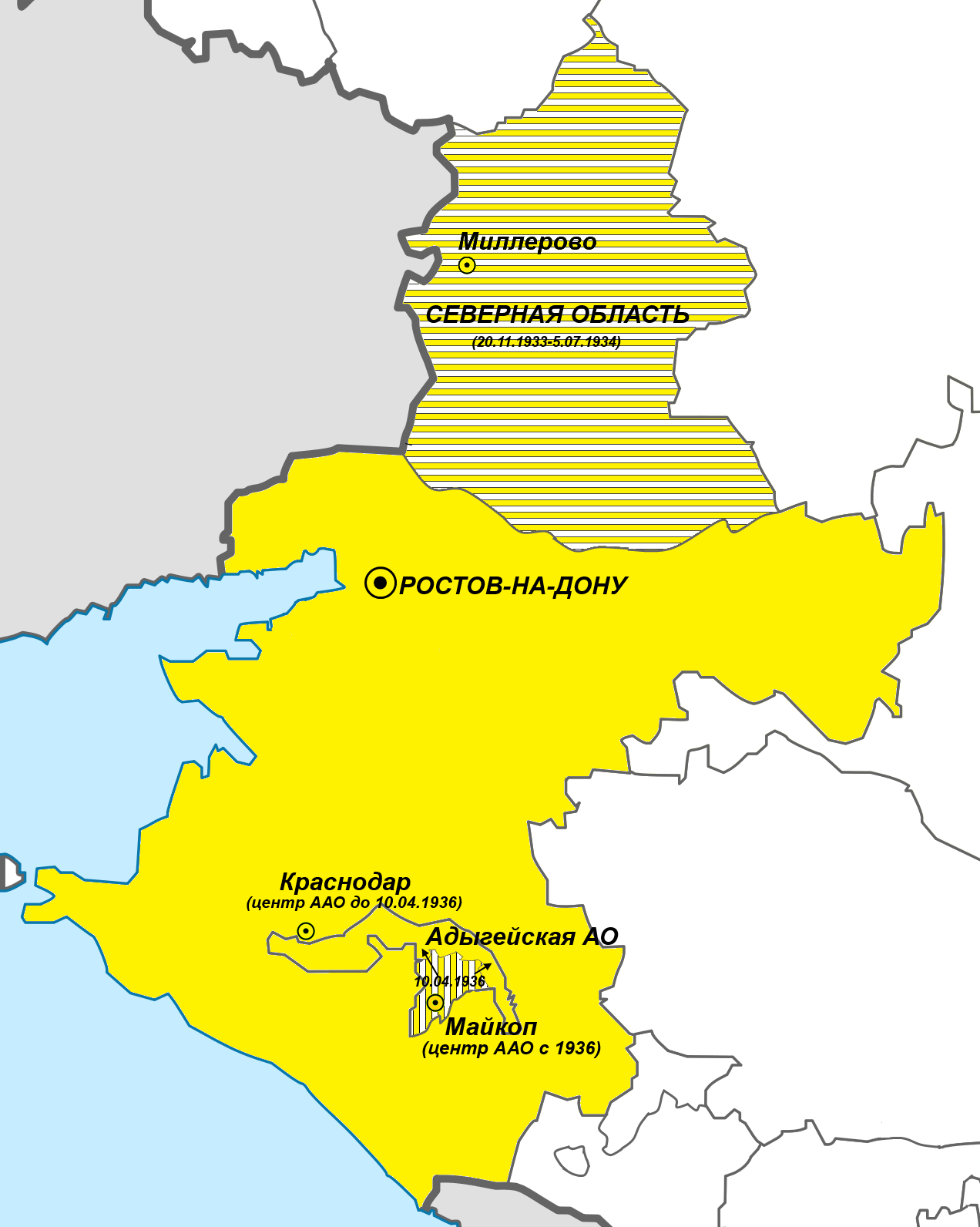
- Azov-Black Sea Krai (1934–1937)
- Capital: Rostov-on-Don
- Area
  - Coordinates: 47°14′N 39°42′E
- History
  - Established: 10 January 1934
  - Disestablished: 13 September 1937
Preceded by	Succeeded by
North Caucasus Krai	Krasnodar Krai; Rostov Oblast

Azov-Black Sea Krai (Russian: Азово-Черноморский край, romanized: Azovo-Chernomorskiy kray) was an early krai of the Russian SFSR of the Soviet Union. Its capital was Rostov-on-Don.

It was formed on 10 January 1934 out of the North Caucasus Krai. According to the 1937 All-Union Census, it had population of 5,601,759.

On 13 September 1937 it was split into Krasnodar Krai and Rostov Oblast.
