= Ingush =

Ingush may refer to:

- Ingush language, Northeast Caucasian language
- Ingush people, an ethnic group of the North Caucasus

== See also ==
- Ingushetia (disambiguation)
