= Mountain Autonomous Soviet Socialist Republic =

1921-1924 autonomous republic in the Russian SFSR

Mountain Autonomous Soviet Socialist Republic Горская Автономная Советская Социалистическая Республика (Russian) Лаьмнийн Автономин Советийн Социалистийн Республика (Chechen)
- ASSR of the Russian SFSR
- 1921–1924
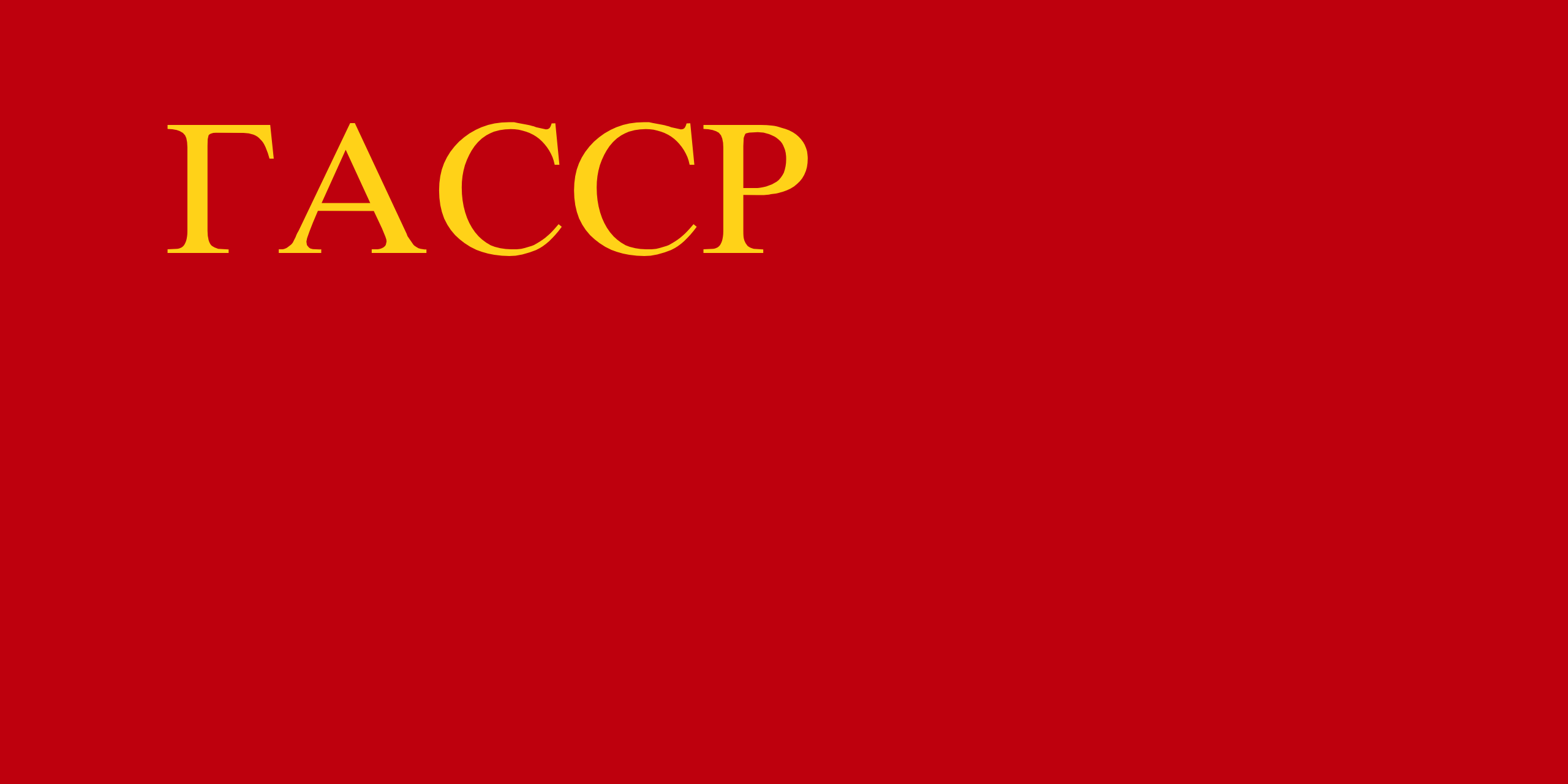
- Possible flag (reconstruction)

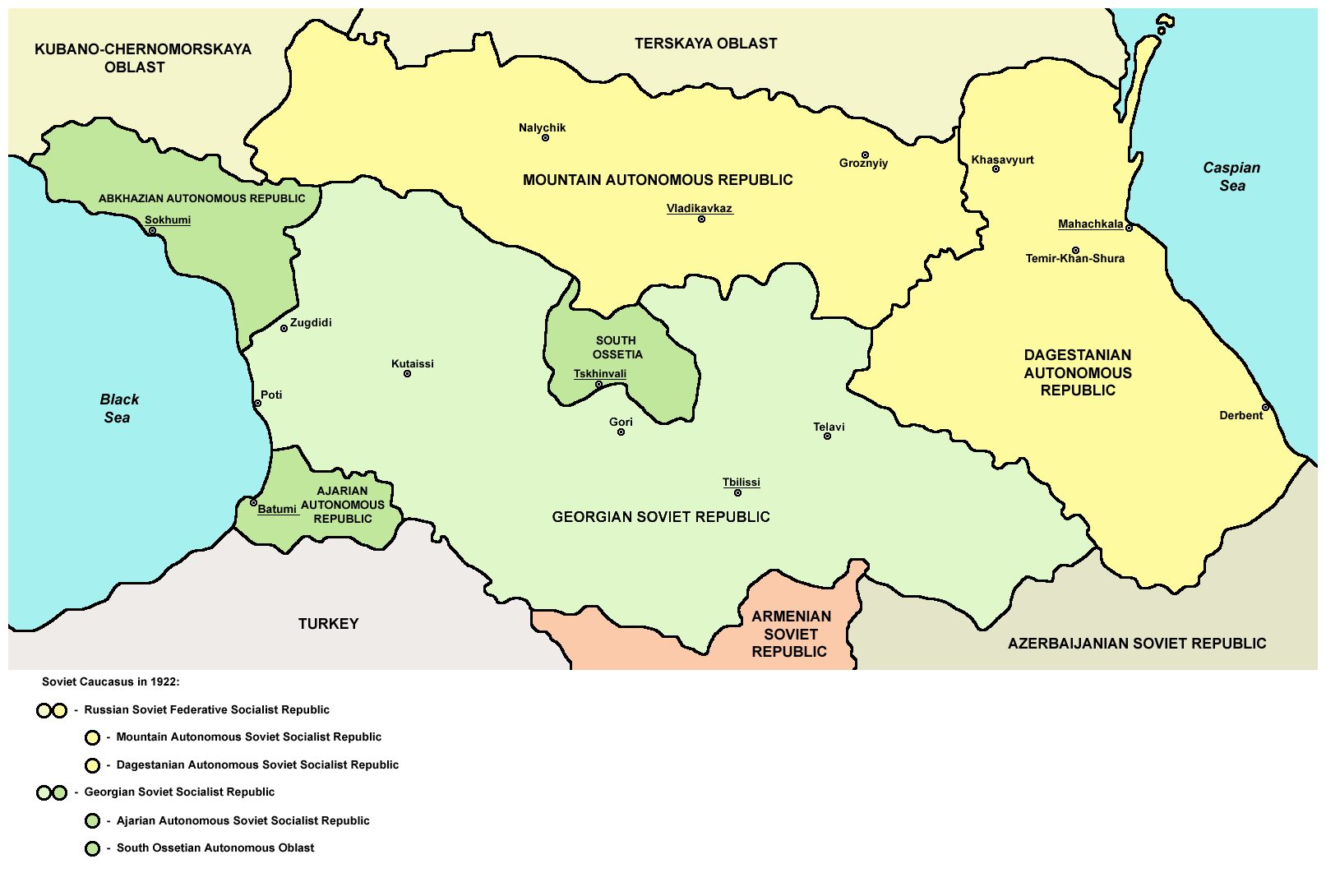
- Soviet Caucasus as of 1922
- Capital: Vladikavkaz
  - Type: Socialist republic
- Historical era: Interwar period
  - Incorporation into RSFSR: 20 January 1921
  - Annexation: 7 July 1924
Preceded by
Mountain Republic
North Caucasian Emirate
Succeeded by
Karachay-Cherkess AO
Kabardino-Balkarian AO
Chechen AO
North Ossetian AO
Ingush AO

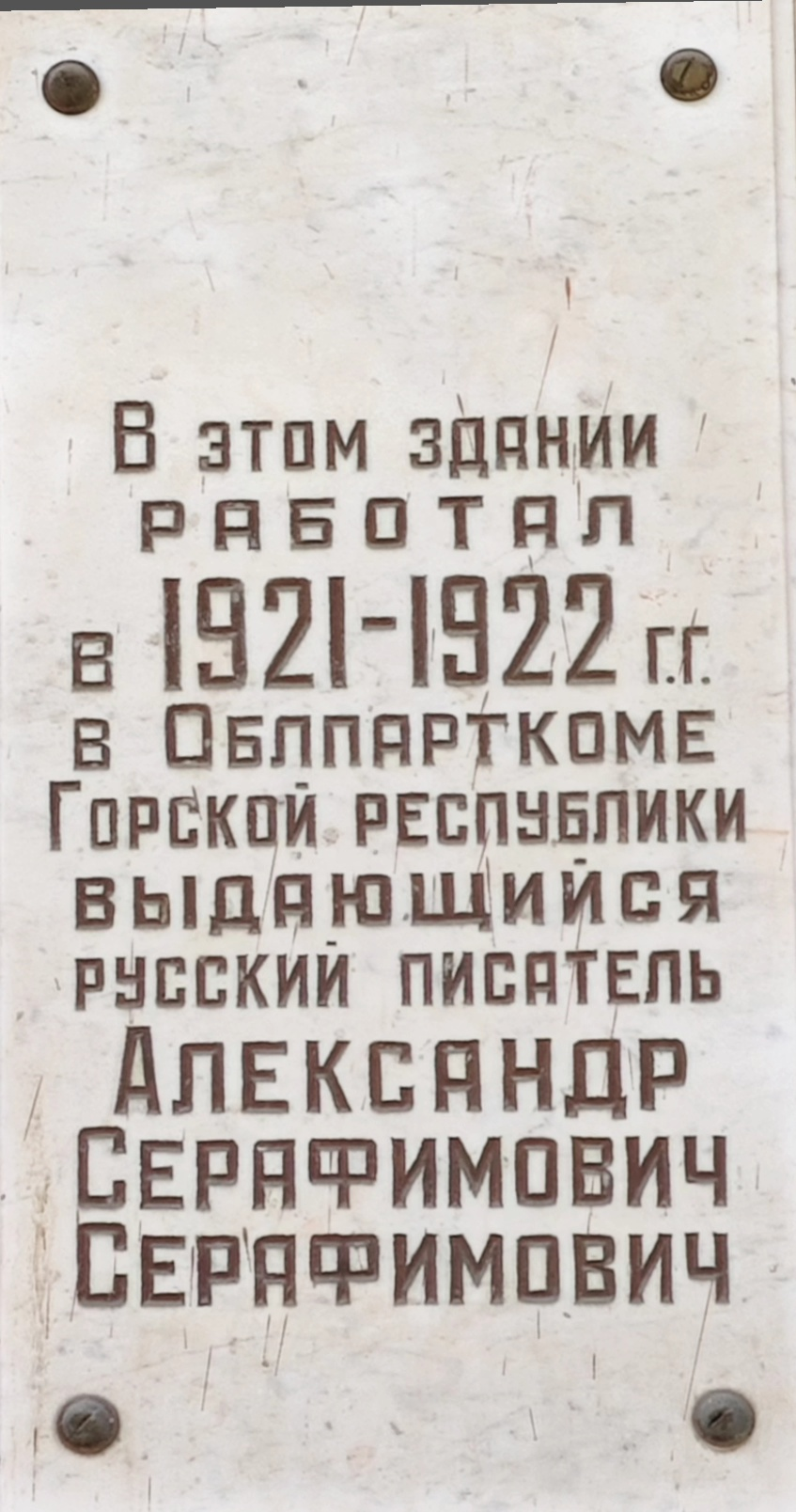
Plaque on 20 Proletarsky Prospect (now Mira Prospect) in Vladikavkaz, noting that the writer Alexander Serafimovich worked in this building as part of the Regional Party Committee of the Mountain ASSR in 1921–22

The Mountain Autonomous Soviet Socialist Republic (Russian: Горская Автономная Советская Социалистическая Республика, romanized: Gorskaya Avtonomnaya Sovetskaya Sotsialisticheskaya Respublika; Chechen: Лаьмнийн Автономин Советийн Социалистийн Республика, romanized: Lämniyn Avtonomin Sovetiyn Socialistiyn Respublika) or Mountain ASSR (Russian: Го́рская АССР, romanized: Górskaya ASSR) was a short-lived autonomous republic within the Russian SFSR in the Northern Caucasus that existed from 20 January 1921 to 7 July 1924. The Mountainous Republic of the Northern Caucasus was created from parts of the Kuban and Terek Oblasts by the indigenous nationalities after the Russian Revolution; however, Soviet rule was installed on this territory after the Red Army conquered the Northern Caucasus in the course of the Russian Civil War, and the former republic was transformed into a Soviet one. The area of the republic was over 73,000 square kilometres (28,000 sq mi), and the population was about 800,000. It comprised six okrugs: Balkar, Chechen, Kabardian, Karachay, Nazran (Ingushetia), and Vladikavkaz Okrug (Ossetia) and had two cities: Grozny and Vladikavkaz. In addition, a special autonomy was provided to the Terek Cossacks: Sunzha Cossack Okrug, which included a large enclave in Northern Ingushetia, and a smaller one bordering Grozny. Its boundaries approximated those of classical Zyx.

The ASSR did not exist in its original state very long. Already on 1 September 1921, Kabardin Okrug was split from the ASSR as separate Kabardin Autonomous Oblast, subordinated directly to the RSFSR. Next came Karachay Okrug, which was transformed into Karachay-Cherkess Autonomous Oblast on 12 January 1922; Balkar Okrug, which was merged with Kabardin AO into Kabardino-Balkarian Autonomous Oblast on 16 January 1922; and Chechen Okrug, which was transformed into the Chechen Autonomous Oblast on 30 November 1922.

By the Decree of the Supreme Soviet of 7 July 1924, the remaining territory of the ASSR was partitioned into the North Ossetian Autonomous Oblast and the Ingush Autonomous Oblast. The Sunzha Cossack Okrug and the city of Vladikavkaz were directly subordinated to the VTsIK until 17 October 1924, when North Caucasus Krai was formed and integrated all of the former ASSR in addition to those two units.

In the 19th century, the best land in the Region was given to Cossacks, Russian and Ukrainian military colonizers, while many natives were driven to the mountains. In 1920, the Soviet government decided to deport the Terek Cossacks and give their farms to the natives. A total of 34,637 individuals were deported to Vladikavkaz, Arkhangelsk and Donbas. Hundreds of families were later found to be supporters of the Soviet government. In January 1921, the forced resettlement of the Cossacks was stopped, and some families returned to occupy abandoned farms, but the densely populated line of Tsarist-era military settlements was erased from the North Caucasus forever and the natives were free to occupy the fertile lands on the valley floors. In 1882, 24.7% of the Ingush lived in the mountains, but by 1924 only 2.1% did.

During the Cold War, many Western historians saw the disintegration of the Mountaineer Republic as a divide-and-conquer strategy by the Soviet government to keep the peoples of the Caucasus weak and subjugated to Moscow. The Soviet archives that became public in the 1990s have shown this not to be the case. The disintegration of the republic started in March 1921, just two months after its creation, when the leaders of Kabarda expressed their discontent at having been made part of the republic and cited the absence of economic links between the Kabards and other Mountaineer peoples. From April to June 1921, Kabarda held a congress at which 140 delegates, only 28 of the Bolsheviks, had overwhelmingly voted not just to become an autonomous oblast, but to also demand autonomous republic status. Joseph Stalin had to talk the leader of the Kabards, Betal Kalmykov, out of applying for a full union republic status.

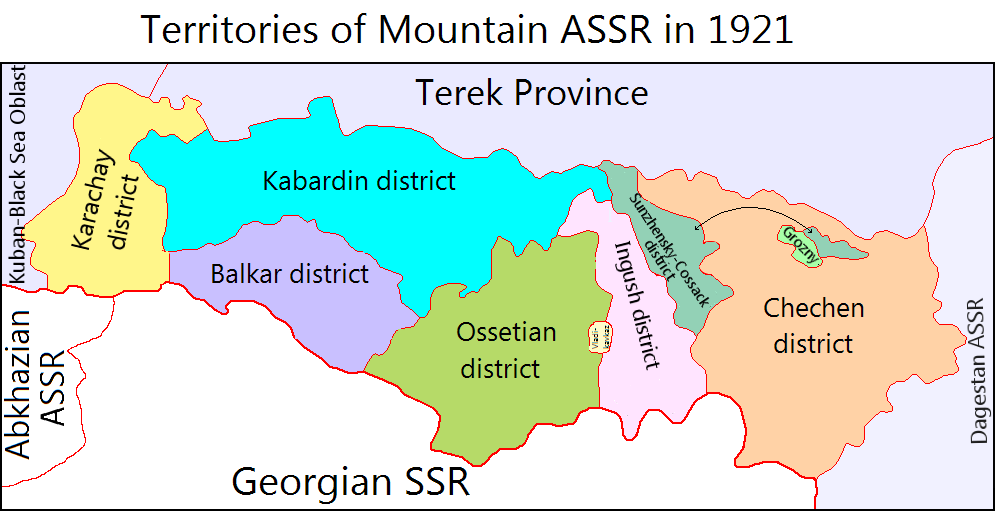
Map of the Mountain ASSR, with okrugs labeled as "districts".

== Bibliography ==
- Даудов, А. Х. (2012). "Государственное устройство Горской АССР" [The state structure of the Mountain ASSR]. Вестник Санкт-Петербургского университета (in Russian) (1). СПб.: Санкт-Петербургский государственный университет: 31–41. ISSN 1812-9323.
