= Komi (Zyryan) Autonomous Oblast =

1921–1936 unit of Russia

Coordinates: 64°18′N 52°15′E

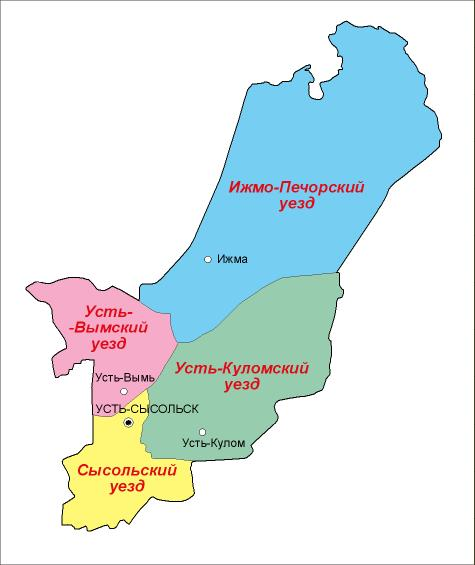
Map of Komi (Ziryan) AO, 1927

Komi (Zyryan) Autonomous Oblast (Note: Russian: Автономная область Коми (Зырян), romanized: Avtonomnaya oblast' Komi (Zyryan); Komi: Коми (Зыряна) асвеськӧдлан обласьт, romanized: Komi (Zyryana) asves’ködlan oblas’t) was an oblast-level administrative-territorial unit (autonomous oblast) of the Russian SFSR, which existed from 22 August 1921 until 1936. It was the predecessor of the Komi ASSR. The seat of the Oblast was located in Ust-Sysolsk (renamed "Syktyvkar" in 1930).
