= Ingush Autonomous Oblast =

Former autonomous oblast of the Russian SFSR (1924-34)

Coordinates: 43°19′N 45°41′E

Ingush Autonomous Oblast ГІалгІай АО (Ingush) Ингушская АО (Russian)
- Autonomous oblast of the Soviet Union
- 1922–1934
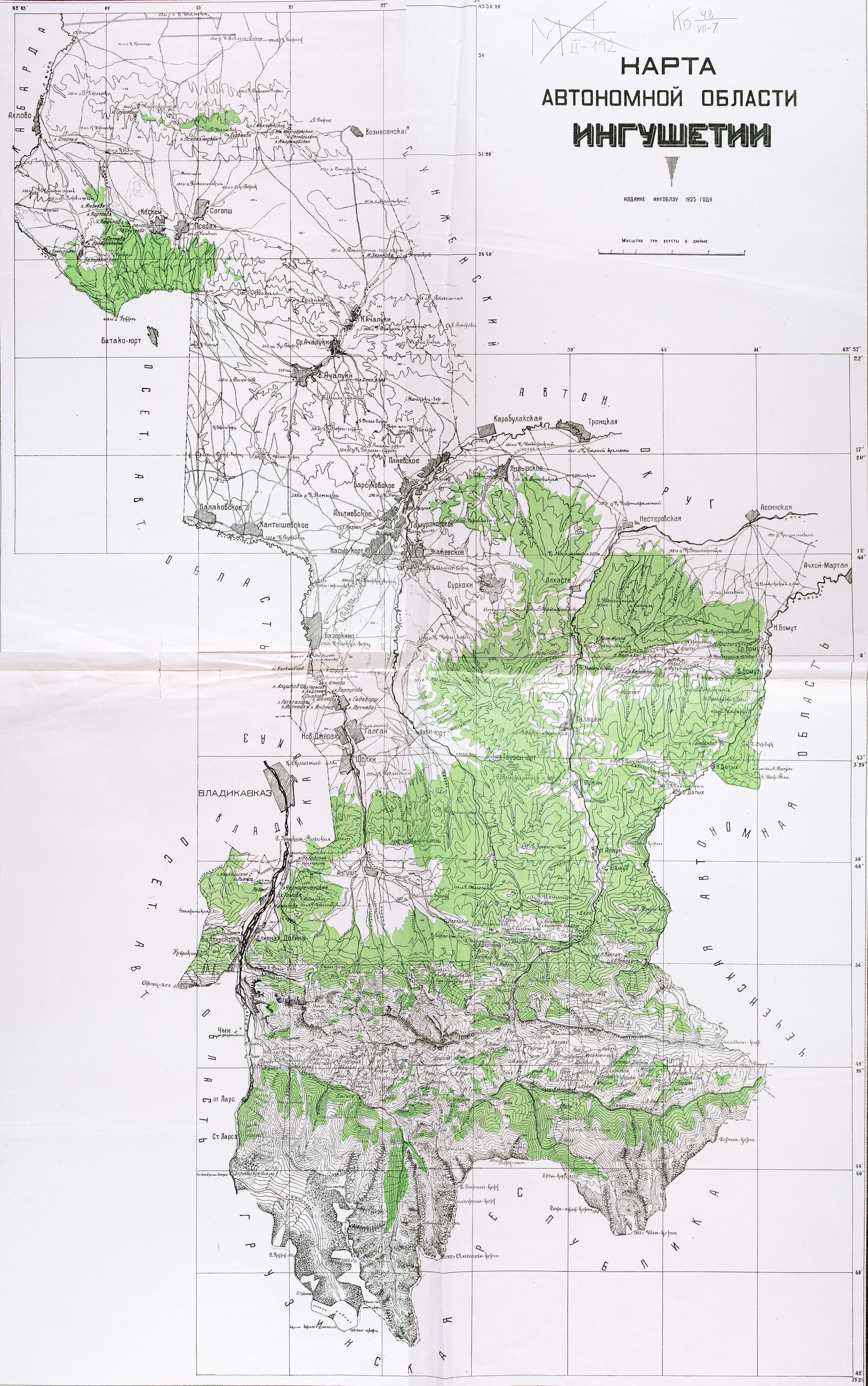
- Capital: Vladikavkaz
- Demonym: Ingush
- Historical era: 20th century
  - Established: 7 July 1924
  - Disestablished: 15 January 1934
Preceded by	Succeeded by
Mountain Autonomous Soviet Socialist Republic	Chechen–Ingush Autonomous Oblast
- Today part of: Russia · Ingushetia · North Ossetia-Alania · Chechnya

The Ingush Autonomous Oblast (Ingush: ГӀалгӀай автономе область, Russian: Ингушская автономная область) was an autonomous oblast of the Russian SFSR in the Soviet Union, created on 7 July 1924. Since 16 October 1924 it belonged to the North Caucasus Krai. It was merged with the Chechen Autonomous Oblast to form the Checheno-Ingush Autonomous Oblast on 15 January 1934.

== Bibliography ==
- Шмидт, О. Ю., ed. (1937). "Ингушская автономная область" [Ingush Autonomous Oblast]. Империалистическая война — Интерполяция [Imperialist War - Interpolation]. Большая советская энциклопедия (in Russian). Vol. 28 (1st ed.). Москва: Советская энциклопедия. p. 65.
