= Karachay-Cherkess Autonomous Oblast =

Region of the Russian Soviet Federative Socialist Republic

Karachay-Cherkessia Autonomous Oblast Къарачай-Черкес АО Къэрэшей-Черкес АО Карачаево-Черкесская АО
- Autonomous oblast of the Soviet Union
- 1922–1926; 1957–1991
- Location of the Karachay-Cherkess AO in the European Soviet Union.
- Capital: Cherkessk
- Historical era: 20th century
  - Established: 12 January 1922
  - Split into Karachay AO and Cherkess AO: 1926
  - Recreation: 1957
  - Disestablished: 1991
Preceded by
1922; Mountain Autonomous Soviet Socialist Republic
1957: Karachay Autonomous Oblast
Cherkess Autonomous Oblast
Succeeded by
1926: Karachay Autonomous Oblast
Cherkess Autonomous Oblast
1991: Karachay-Cherkessia
- Today part of: Russia: Karachay-Cherkessia

Karachay-Cherkessia Autonomous Oblast (Russian: Карачаево-Черкесская автономная область, romanized: Karachaevo-Cherkesskaya avtonomaya oblast’; Karachay-Balkar: Къарачай-Черкес автоном область, romanized: Qaraçay-Çerkes avtonom oblast; Kabardian: Къэрэшей-Черкес автономнэ область, romanized: Qərəṩey-Cherkes avtonomnə oblast’; Abaza: Къарча-Черкес автоном область, Q̇arća-Ćerkes avtonom oblast’) was an autonomous oblast of the Russian Soviet Federative Socialist Republic in the Soviet Union that was created on 12 January 1922, and was the predecessor of the Karachay-Cherkess Republic. The Karachay-Cherkess oblast was first formed in 1922 for the Circassian (Cherkess) and Karachays peoples. The oblast was dissolved in 1926, to form the Karachay Autonomous Oblast and Cherkess Autonomous Oblast. Karachay Autonomous Oblast was dissolved in 1943, when the Karachays were exiled to Central Asia for their alleged collaboration with the Germans. In 1957, upon their return, the Karachay-Cherkess autonomous oblast was recreated. During this time, part of the territory was incorporated into the Georgian SSR. In 1991 it became a republic.
