= Chechen Autonomous Oblast =

Former autonomous oblast of the Russian SFSR (1922-34)

Coordinates: 43°19′N 45°41′E

Chechen Autonomous Oblast Нохчийн АО (Chechen) Чеченская АО (Russian)
- Autonomous oblast of the Soviet Union
- 1922–1934
- Capital: Grozny
- Demonym: Chechens
- Historical era: 20th century
  - Established: 30 November 1922
  - Disestablished: 15 January 1934
Preceded by	Succeeded by
Mountain Autonomous Soviet Socialist Republic	Checheno-Ingush Autonomous Oblast
- Today part of: Russia · Chechnya · Dagestan

The Chechen Autonomous Oblast (Chechen: Нохчийн автономин область, romanized: Noxçiyn avtonomin oblast; Russian: Чеченская автономная область, romanized: Chechenskaya avtonomnaya oblast'), or Autonomous Oblast of Chechnya (Russian: автономная область Чечни, romanized: avtonomnaya oblast' Chechni), was an autonomous oblast of the Russian SFSR, created on November 30, 1922 when it was separated from the Mountain ASSR on the advice of Anastas Mikoyan. From 16 October 1924 it belonged to the North Caucasus Krai.

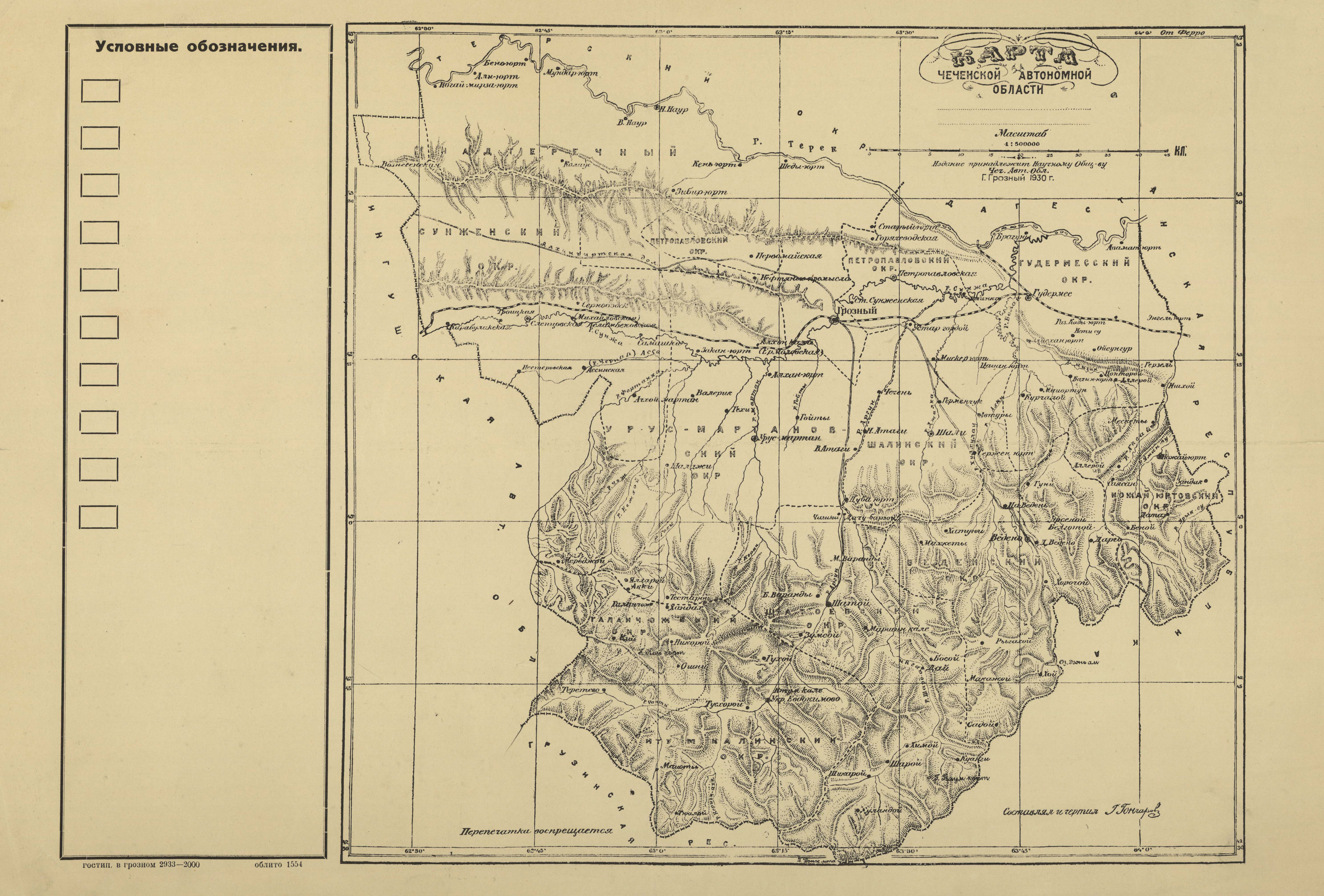
Map of the Chechen Autonomous Oblast in 1930

On January 15, 1934, the Chechen and Ingush Autonomous Oblasts were merged to form the Chechen–Ingush Autonomous Oblast.
