= Karachay Autonomous Oblast =

Karachay Autonomous Oblast was an autonomous oblast in the Soviet Union created on 26 April 1926. It was formed by the split of the Karachay-Cherkess Autonomous Oblast in 1926, creating Karachay and Cherkess Autonomous Oblast. Karachay Autonomous Oblast was dissolved during World War II, when the Karachay people were exiled to Central Asia for their alleged collaboration with the Germans. During this time, the territory was partitioned between the Georgian SSR, Cherkess AO, Stavropol and Krasnodar regions. In 1957 it and the Cherkess Autonomous Oblast merged to reinstate the Karachay-Cherkess Autonomous Oblast.
