= Cherkess Autonomous Oblast =

Autonomous oblast of the Russian SFSR, Soviet Union

The Cherkess Autonomous Oblast (Russian: Черкесская автономная область, romanized: Cherkesskaya avtonomnaya oblast; Kabardian: Черкес автономнэ область, Čérkés avtonomne oblast’) or Cherkessia (Russian: Черкесия, romanized: Cherkesiya; Kabardian: Шэрджэс, Šerdžes, or Черкес хэку, Čérkés xekw) was an autonomous oblast of the Russian SFSR, Soviet Union, created on April 26, 1926, by the split of the Karachay-Cherkess Autonomous Oblast. It was called the Cherkess National Okrug (Russian: Черкесский национальный округ, romanized: Cherkessky natsionalny okrug) until April 30, 1928. It was dissolved in 1957 by the creation of the new Karachay-Cherkess Autonomous Oblast.

Territorial changes of the Cherkess Autonomous Oblast

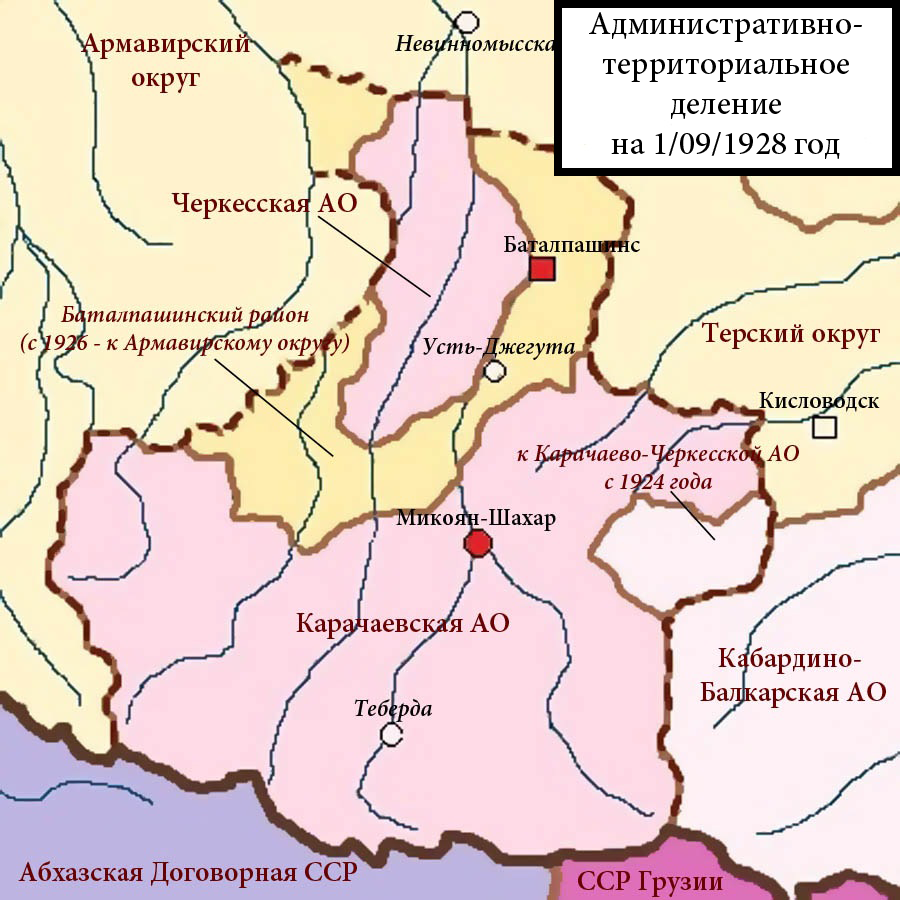
1928

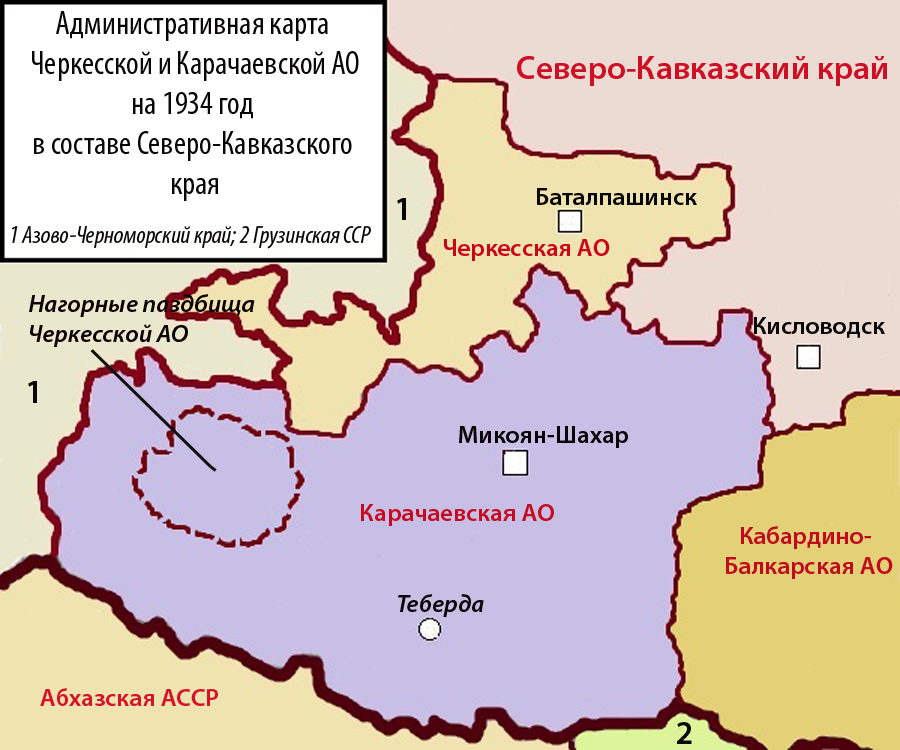
1934

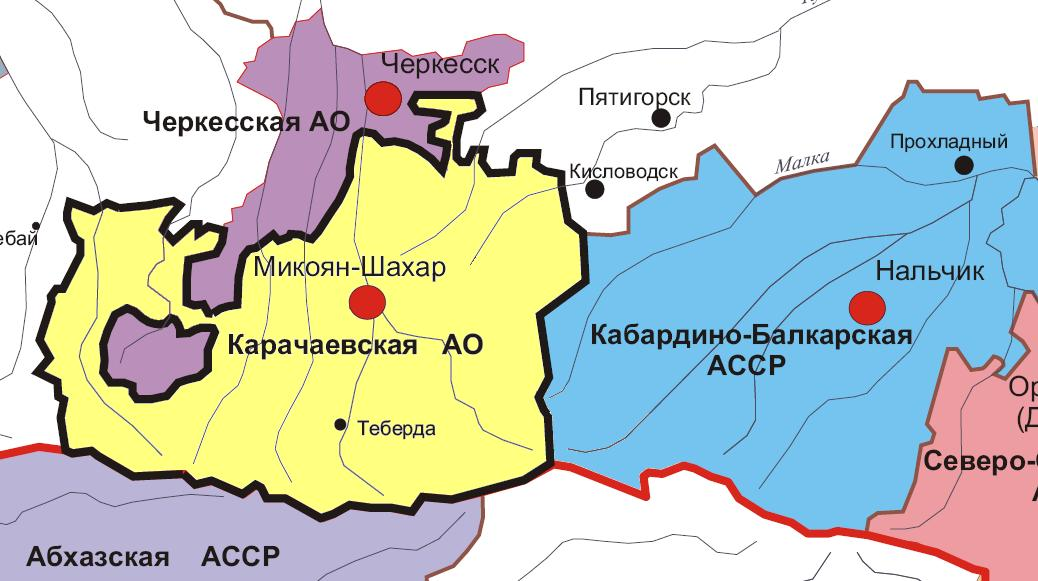
1943

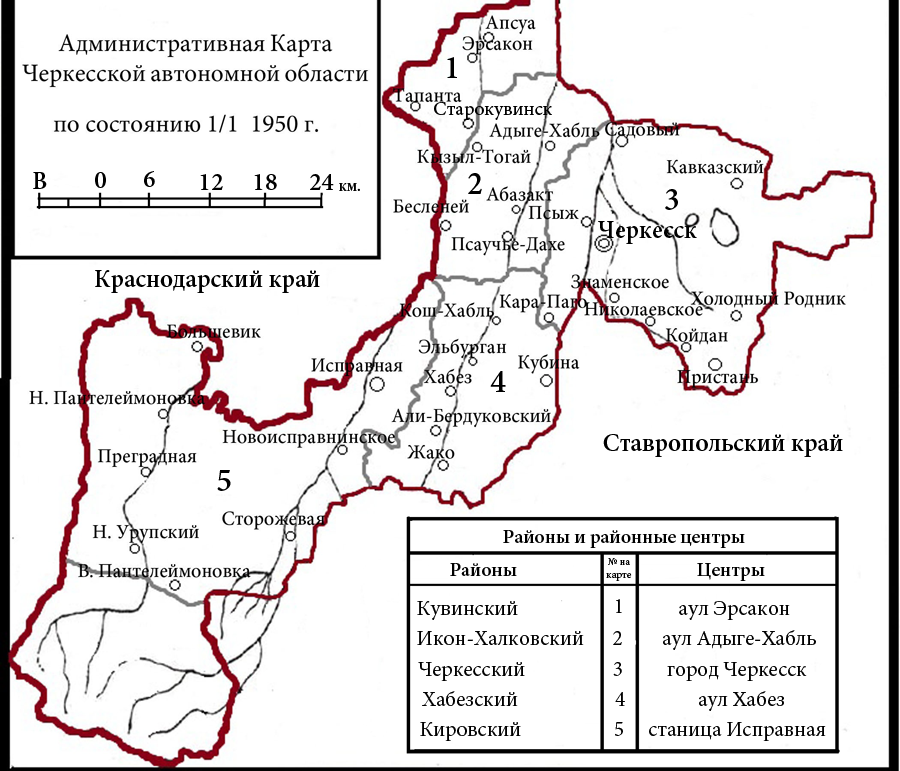
1950
