= North Caucasus Krai =

Soviet Union administrative division

Coordinates: 45.7°N 43.1°E

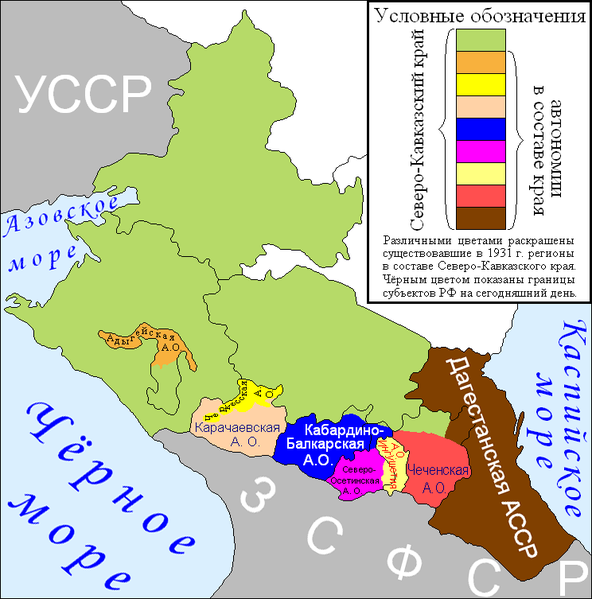
North Caucasus Krai (green) in 1931 before the creation of the Azov-Black Sea Krai in 1934

North Caucasus Krai (Russian: Се́веро-Кавка́зский край, Severo-Kavkazskiy kray) was an administrative division (krai) within the Russian Soviet Federative Socialist Republic of the Soviet Union. It was established on 17 October 1924. Its administrative center was Rostov-on-Don until 10 January 1934, Pyatigorsk until January 1936, then Ordzhonikidze (today Vladikavkaz) and, from 15 December 1936, Voroshilovsk (today Stavropol).

As of 1932, the population of the krai was estimated at 10,290,000 in an area of 351,800 km^{2}. 45.9% of the overall population was Russian, and 37.2% of the overall population was Ukrainian.

Widespread death by starvation occurred in the krai during the Soviet famine of 1932–33.

As of the 1937 All-Union Census, the krai had a population of 1,635,277 in a smaller area.

After undergoing numerous administrative changes, including the loss of the majority of its territory to the new Azov-Black Sea Krai on 10 January 1934, it was renamed Ordzhonikidze Krai (Орджоникидзевский край), after Sergo Ordzhonikidze, on 13 March 1937, and Stavropol Krai on 12 January 1943.

Since 19 January 2010, the region has been divided between the North Caucasian Federal District and the Southern Federal District.

== Demographics ==
=== Nationalities ===
- Nationalities of the krai according to the Soviet census of 1926. Note that the Dagestan ASSR was not part of the krai in 1926.

Nationality	Number	percentage (%)	males	females
Russians	3,841,063	46.2	1,811,824	2,029,239
Ukrainians	3,106,852	37.4	1,489,237	1,617,615
Chechens	296,282	3.56	151,934	144,348
Armenians	162,186	1.95	83,270	78,916
Ossetians	155,400	1.87	77,611	77,789
Kabardians (Note: Kabardians and Circassians counted separately)	139,689	1.68	70,874	68,815
Germans	93,915	1.13	45,567	48,348
Ingush	72,043	0.88	36,091	35,952
Circassians	64,031	0.77	32,925	31,106
Karachays	55,068	0.66	27,717	27,351
Belarusians	51,317	0.62	32,925	31,106
Jews (Note: Mountain, Crimean, and Georgian Jews counted separately from other Jews)	42,476	0.51	20,486	21,990
Balkars	33,280	0.40	17,120	16,160
Greeks	32,178	0.38	16,039	16,139
Tatars	19,053	0.23	10,766	8,287
Poles	18,425	0.22	9,186	9,239
Georgians (Note: including Adjarians, Mingrelians, and Svans)	15,011	0.18	8,621	6,390
Abazins	13,813	0.16	7,125	6,688
Kalmyks	11,712	0.14	6,003	5,709
Moldovans (Note: 562 Romanians were counted separately)	9,546	0.11	4,828	4,718
Others	74,594	0.90	41,375	33,219
Total Soviet Union citizens	8,307,934	100.0	3,994,947	4,312,987
Aliens	55,557	(0.66)	31,599	23,958

== See also ==
- Kuban
