= Russian Soviet Federative Socialist Republic =

Soviet republic from 1917 to 1991

Russian Soviet Federative Socialist Republic Российская Советская Федеративная Социалистическая Республика
- 1917–1991
- Flag: (1954–1991); State emblem: (1978–1991)
- Motto: Пролетарии всех стран, соединяйтесь! "Workers of the world, unite!"
- Anthem: Рабочая Марсельеза "Worker's Marseillaise" (1917–1918); Интернационал "The Internationale" (1918–1944); Государственный гимн Союза Советских Социалистических Республик "State Anthem of the Union of Soviet Socialist Republics" (1944–1990); Патриотическая песня "Patrioticheskaya Pesnya" (1990–1991)
- The Russian SFSR (red) within the Soviet Union (red and white)
- Status: Sovereign state (1917‍–‍1922); Union Republic of the Soviet Union (1922‍–‍1991); Union Republic of the Soviet Union with priority of republican legislation (1990‍–‍1991)
- Capital: Petrograd (1917‍–‍1918); Moscow (1918‍–‍1991)
- Largest city: Moscow
- Official languages: Russian
- Recognised languages: See Languages of Russia
- Religion: Secular state (de jure); State atheism (de facto); Russian Orthodoxy (majority)
- Demonym: Russian
- Government: Federal communist state
- Head of state
  - 1917 (first): Lev Kamenev
  - 1990–1991 (last): Boris Yeltsin
- Head of government
  - 1917–1924 (first): Vladimir Lenin
  - 1990–1991: Ivan Silayev
  - 1991 (last): Boris Yeltsin
- Legislature: Congress of Soviets (1917‍–‍1938); Supreme Soviet (1938‍–‍1990); Congress of People's Deputies (1990‍–‍1991)
- History
  - October Revolution: 7 November 1917
  - Russian Civil War: 1917–1922
  - Soviet republic proclaimed: 25 January 1918
  - USSR created: 30 December 1922
  - Crimea transferred to Ukrainian SSR: 19 February 1954
  - State sovereignty: 12 June 1990
  - Belovezh Accords: 12 December 1991
  - Russian SFSR renamed into the Russian Federation: 25 December 1991
  - Dissolution of the Soviet Union: 26 December 1991
  - End of the Soviet political system: 25 December 1993

Area
- 1956: 17,125,200 km^{2} (6,612,100 sq mi)

Population
  - 1989 census: 147,400,537
  - 1990 estimate: 147,969,406
- GDP (PPP): 1990 estimate
  - Total: $1.19 trillion
  - Per capita: $8,027.8
- GDP (nominal): 1990 estimate
  - Total: $517.01 billion
  - Per capita: $3,491.1
- HDI (1990): 0.762 high
- Currency: Soviet ruble (SUR)
- Time zone: (UTC +2 to +12)
- Calling code: +7
- ISO 3166 code: RU
- Internet TLD: .su
Preceded by
1918: Russian Republic
1920: Russian State
1922: Far Eastern Republic
1923: Priamurye Government
Succeeded by
Russian Federation

The Russian Soviet Federative Socialist Republic (Note: Russian: Российская Советская Федеративная Социалистическая Республика, romanized: Rossiyskaya Sovetskaya Federativnaya Sotsialisticheskaya Respublika, IPA: [rɐˈsʲijskəjə sɐˈvʲetskəjə fʲɪdʲɪrɐˈtʲivnəjə sətsɨəlʲɪˈsʲtʲitɕɪskəjə rʲɪˈspublʲɪkə]) (Russian SFSR) (Note: Often abbreviated as RSFSR (Russian: РСФСР). Previously known as the Russian Socialist Federative Soviet Republic, the Russian Federative Soviet Republic, and the Russian Soviet Republic, and unofficially as the Russian Federation or Soviet Russia.) was a revolutionary, and later, communist state from 1917 to 1922, and afterwards the largest and most populous constituent republic of the Soviet Union (USSR) from 1922 to 1991, until becoming a sovereign part of the Soviet Union with priority of Russian laws over Union-level legislation in 1990 and 1991, the last two years of the existence of the USSR. The Russian SFSR was composed of sixteen smaller constituent units of autonomous republics, five autonomous oblasts, ten autonomous okrugs, six krais and forty oblasts. Russians formed the largest ethnic group. The capital of the Russian SFSR and the USSR as a whole was Moscow and the other major urban centers included Leningrad (Petrograd until 1924), Stalingrad (Volgograd after 1961), Novosibirsk, Sverdlovsk, Gorky and Kuybyshev.

On 7 November 1917 [O.S. 25 October], as a result of the October Revolution, the Russian Soviet Republic was proclaimed as a sovereign revolutionary republic and, after March 1921, the world's first communist state guided by communist ideology. The first constitution was adopted in 1918. In 1922, the Russian SFSR signed a treaty officially creating the USSR. On 12 June 1990, the Congress of People's Deputies adopted the Declaration of State Sovereignty. On 12 June 1991, Boris Yeltsin, supported by the Democratic Russia pro-reform movement, was elected the first and only President of the RSFSR, a post that would later become the Presidency of the Russian Federation. The August 1991 Soviet coup d'état attempt in Moscow with the temporary brief internment of President Mikhail Gorbachev destabilised the Soviet Union. Following these events, Gorbachev lost all his remaining power, with Yeltsin superseding him as the pre-eminent figure in the country. On 8 December 1991, the heads of Russia, Ukraine and Belarus signed the Belovezha Accords declaring dissolution of the USSR and established the Commonwealth of Independent States (CIS) as a loose replacement confederation. On 12 December, the agreement was ratified by the Supreme Soviet (the parliament of the Russian SFSR); therefore the Russian SFSR had renounced the Treaty on the Creation of the USSR and de facto declared Russia's independence from the USSR itself and the ties with the other Soviet republics.

On 25 December 1991, following the resignation of Gorbachev as President of the Soviet Union, the Russian SFSR was renamed the Russian Federation. (Note: The names Russian Federation and Russia have been equal since 25 December 1993.) The next day, the USSR was self-dissolved by the Soviet of the Republics on 26 December, which by that time was the only functioning parliamentary chamber of the All-Union Supreme Soviet. After the dissolution, Russia took full responsibility for all the rights and obligations of the USSR under the Charter of the United Nations, including the financial obligations. As such, Russia assumed the Soviet Union's UN membership and permanent membership on the Security Council, nuclear stockpile and the control over the armed forces; Soviet embassies abroad became Russian embassies.

The 1978 constitution of the Russian SFSR was amended several times to reflect the transition to democracy, private property and market economy. The new Russian constitution, coming into effect on 25 December 1993 after a constitutional crisis, completely abolished the Soviet form of government and replaced it with a semi-presidential system. The economy of Russia became heavily industrialised, accounting for about two-thirds of the electricity produced in the USSR. By 1961, it was the third largest producer of petroleum due to new discoveries in the Volga-Urals region and Siberia. In 1974, there were 475 institutes of higher education in the republic providing education in 47 languages to some 23,941,000 students. A network of territorially organised public-health services provided health care. The economy began to be liberalised starting in 1985 under Gorbachev's "perestroika" restructuring policies, including the introduction of non-state owned enterprises (e.g. cooperatives).

== Nomenclature ==
Under the leadership of Vladimir Lenin (1870–1924) and Leon Trotsky (1879–1940), the Bolsheviks established the Soviet state on 7 November [O.S. 25 October] 1917. This happened immediately after the October Revolution toppled the interim Russian Provisional Government (most recently led by opposing democratic socialist Alexander Kerensky (1881–1970)) which had governed the new Russian Republic after the abdication of the Russian Empire government of the Romanov imperial dynasty of Tsar Nicholas II the previous March (Old Style: February). The October Revolution was thus the second of the two Russian Revolutions of the turbulent year of 1917. Initially, the new Soviet state lacked an official name and was unrecognised by neighboring countries for five months.

Anti-Bolsheviks soon suggested new names, however. By 1919 they had coined the mocking label Sovdepia (Russian: Совдепия) for the nascent state of the Soviets of Workers' and Peasants' Deputies. Speakers of colloquial English coined the term "Bololand" to refer to the land of the Bolos (a term identified from 1919 onwards with the Bolsheviks).

On 25 January 1918 the third meeting of the All-Russian Congress of Soviets proclaimed the establishment of the Russian Soviet Republic. In July 1918, the Fifth All–Russian Congress of Soviets adopted both the new name, Russian Socialist Federative Soviet Republic (RSFSR), and the Constitution of the Russian SFSR.

Internationally, the Russian SFSR was recognised as an independent state in 1920 only by its bordering neighbors (Estonia, Finland, Latvia and Lithuania) in the Treaty of Tartu and by the short-lived Irish Republic of 1919–1922 in Ireland.

On 30 December 1922, with the treaty on the creation of the Soviet Union, Russia (the RSFSR), alongside the Transcaucasian SFSR, the Ukrainian SSR and the Byelorussian SSR, formed the Union of Soviet Socialist Republics. The final Soviet name for the constituent republic, the Russian Soviet Federative Socialist Republic, was adopted in the later Soviet Constitution of 1936. By that time, Soviet Russia had gained roughly the same borders of the old Tsardom of Russia before the Great Northern War of 1700 to 1721.

On 25 December 1991, during the collapse of the Soviet Union, which concluded on the next day, the RSFSR's official name was changed to the Russian Federation, which it remains to this day. This name and "Russia" were specified as the official state names on 21 April 1992, in an amendment to the then existing Constitution of 1978, and were retained as such in the subsequent 1993 Constitution of Russia.

== Geography ==
At a total of about 17,125,200 km (6,612,100 sq mi), the Russian SFSR was the largest of the fifteen Soviet republics, with its southerly neighbor, the Kazakh SSR, being second.

The international borders of the RSFSR touched Poland on the west; Norway and Finland on the northwest; and to its southeast in eastern Asia were the Democratic People's Republic of Korea (North Korea), Mongolian People's Republic (now Mongolia) and the People's Republic of China (China, formerly the Republic of China; 1912–1949). Within the Soviet Union, the RSFSR bordered the Slavic states: Ukrainian SSR (now Ukraine), Byelorussian SSR (now Belarus), the Baltic states: Estonian SSR (now Estonia), Latvian SSR (now Latvia) and Lithuanian SSR (now Lithuania, included into USSR in 1940) to its west and the Azerbaijan SSR (now Azerbaijan), Georgian SSR (now Georgia), and Kazakh SSR (now Kazakhstan) to the south.

Roughly 70% of the area in the RSFSR consisted of broad plains, with mountainous tundra regions mainly concentrated in the east of Siberia with Central Asia and East Asia. The area is rich in mineral resources, including petroleum, natural gas, and iron ore.

== History ==
=== Early years (1917–1920) ===
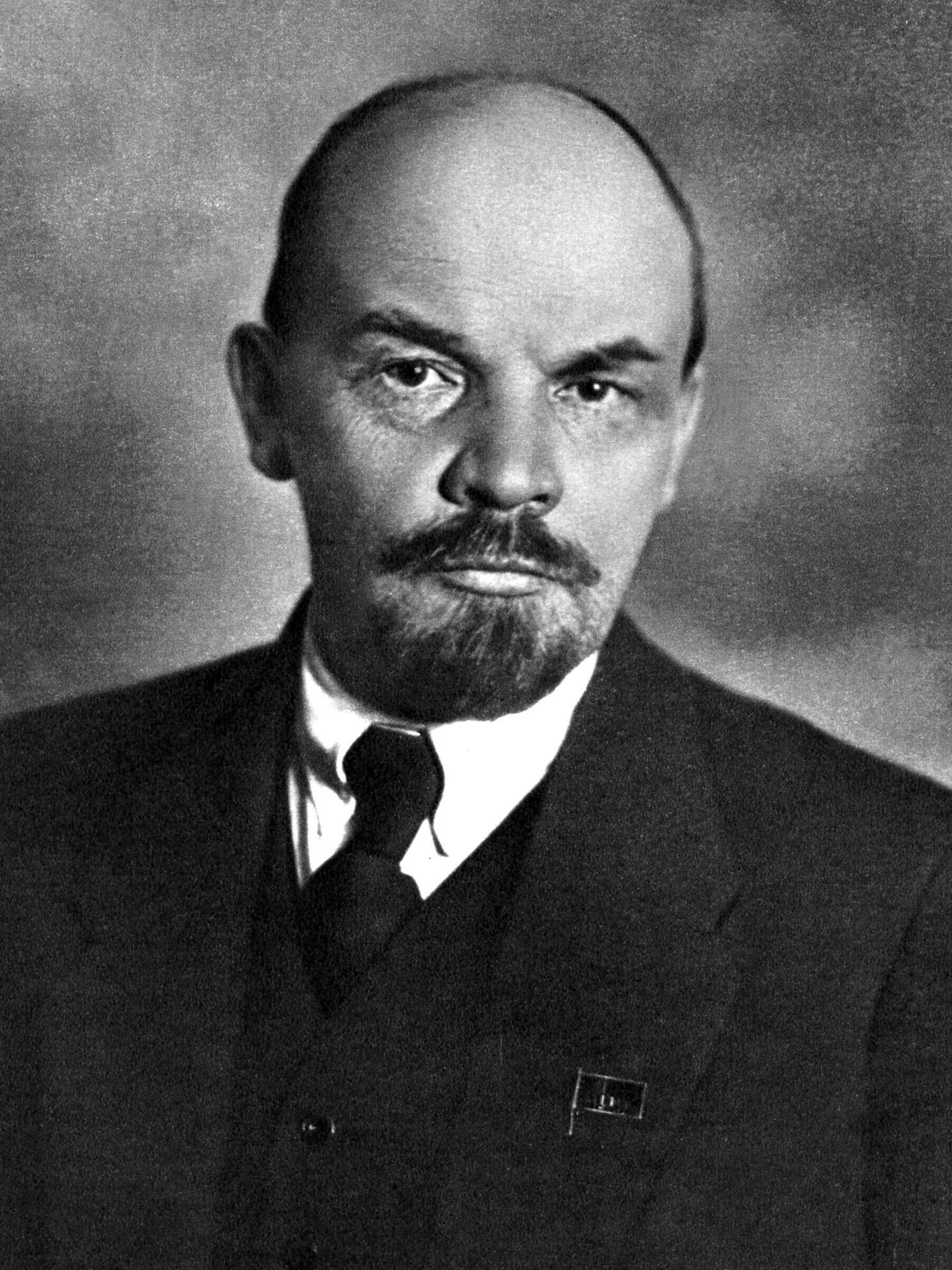
Vladimir Lenin, founder of the Soviet Union and the leader of the Bolshevik party

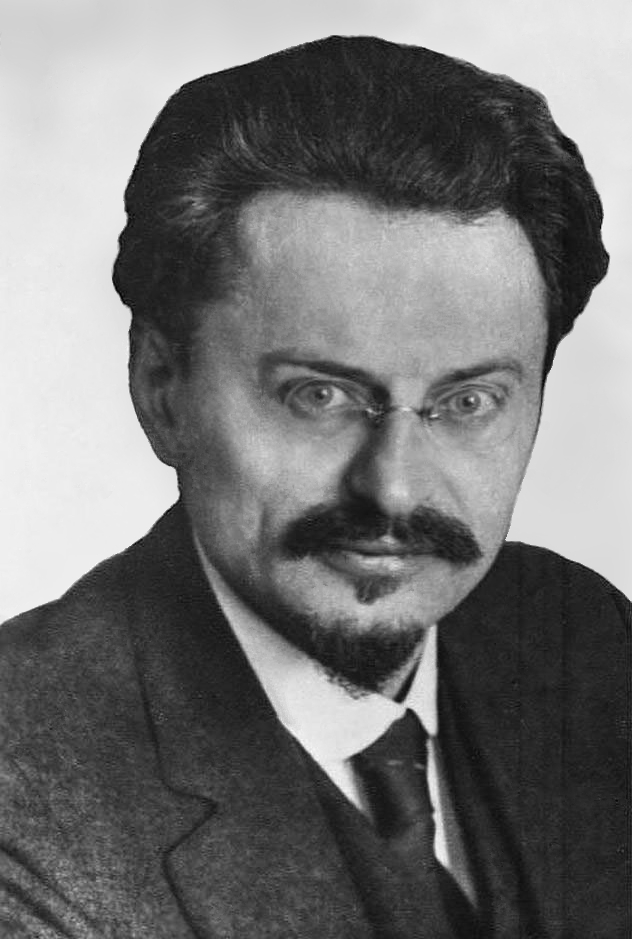
Leon Trotsky, founder of the Red Army and a key figure in the October Revolution

The Soviet government first came to power on 7 November 1917, immediately after the interim Russian Provisional Government headed by Alexander Kerensky, which governed the Russian Republic, was overthrown in the October Revolution, the second of the two Russian Revolutions. The state it governed, which lacked an official name, went unrecognised by neighboring countries for another five months. The initial stage of the October Revolution, which involved the assault on Petrograd, occurred largely without any casualties.

On 18 January 1918, the newly elected Constituent Assembly proclaimed Russia a democratic federal republic under the name "Russian Democratic Federal Republic". However, the Bolsheviks dissolved the Assembly on the following day and nullified its decrees. Conversely, the Bolsheviks also reserved a number of vacant seats in the Soviets and Central Executive for the opposition parties in proportion to their vote share at the Congress. At the same time, a number of prominent members of the Left Socialist Revolutionaries had assumed positions in Lenin's government and lead commissariats in several areas. This included agriculture (Kolegaev), property (Karelin), justice (Steinberg), post offices and telegraphs (Proshian) and local government (Trutovsky). Lenin's government also instituted a number of progressive measures such as universal education, healthcare and equal rights for women.

On 25 January 1918, at the third meeting of the All-Russian Congress of Soviets, the establishment of the Russian Socialist Federative Soviet Republic (RSFSR) was proclaimed. On 3 March 1918, the Treaty of Brest-Litovsk was signed, giving away much of the westernmost lands of the former Russian Empire to the German Empire, in exchange for peace on the Eastern Front of World War I. In July 1918, the fifth All-Russian Congress of Soviets adopted the Constitution of the Russian SFSR. By 1918, during the Russian Civil War, several states within the former Russian Empire had seceded, reducing the size of the country even more, although some were conquered by the Bolsheviks.

=== 1920s ===
The Russian famine of 1921–22, also known as Povolzhye famine, killed an estimated 5 million, primarily affecting the Volga and Ural River regions.

The economic impact of the Civil War was devastating. A black market emerged in Russia, despite the threat of martial law against profiteering. The ruble collapsed, with barter increasingly replacing money as a medium of exchange and, by 1921, heavy industry output had fallen to 20% of 1913 levels. 90% of wages were paid with goods rather than money. 70% of locomotives were in need of repair, and food requisitioning, combined with the effects of seven years of war and a severe drought, contributed to a famine that caused between 3 and 10 million deaths. Coal production decreased from 27.5 million tons (1913) to 7 million tons (1920), while overall factory production also declined from 10,000 million roubles to 1,000 million roubles. According to the noted historian David Christian, the grain harvest was also slashed from 80.1 million tons (1913) to 46.5 million tons (1920).

On 30 December 1922, the First Congress of the Soviets of the USSR approved the Treaty on the Creation of the USSR, by which Russia was united with the Ukrainian Soviet Socialist Republic, Byelorussian Soviet Socialist Republic and Transcaucasian Soviet Federal Socialist Republic into a single federal state, the Soviet Union. The treaty was included in the 1924 Soviet Constitution, adopted on 31 January 1924 by the Second Congress of Soviets of the USSR.

One of the early ambitious economic plans of the Soviet government was GOELRO, Russian abbreviation for "State Commission for Electrification of Russia" (Государственная комиссия по электрификации России), which sought to achieve total electrification of the entire country. Soviet propaganda declared the plan was basically fulfilled by 1931. The national power output per year stood at 1.9 billion kWh in Imperial Russia in 1913, and Lenin's goal of 8.8 billion kWh was reached in 1931. National power output continued to increase significantly. It reached 13.5 billion kWh by the end of the first five-year plan in 1932, 36 billion kWh by 1937, and 48 billion kWh by 1940.

Paragraph 3 of Chapter 1 of the 1925 Constitution of the RSFSR stated the following:

By the will of the peoples of the Russian Socialist Federative Soviet Republic, who decided on the formation of the Union of Soviet Socialist Republics during the Tenth All-Russian Congress of Soviets, the Russian Socialist Federative Soviet Republic, being a part of the Union of Soviet Socialist Republics, devolves to the Union the powers which according to Article 1 of the Constitution of the Union of Soviet Socialist Republics are included within the scope of responsibilities of the government bodies of the Union of Soviet Socialist Republics.

=== 1930s ===
Many regions in Russia were affected by the Soviet famine of 1932–1933: Volga, Central Black Soil Region, North Caucasus, the Urals, the Crimea, part of Western Siberia, and the Kazakh ASSR. With the adoption of the 1936 Soviet Constitution on 5 December 1936, the size of the RSFSR was significantly reduced. The Kazakh ASSR and Kirghiz ASSR were transformed into the Kazakh SSR (now Kazakhstan) and Kirghiz Soviet Socialist Republic (Kyrgyzstan). The former Karakalpak Autonomous Socialist Soviet Republic was transferred to the Uzbek Soviet Socialist Republic (Uzbekistan).

The final name for the republic during the Soviet era was adopted by the Russian Constitution of 1937, which renamed it the Russian Soviet Federative Socialist Republic (RSFSR).

=== 1940s ===
Just four months after Operation Barbarossa, the Wehrmacht was quickly advancing through the Russian SFSR, and was approximately 10 miles (16 km) away from Moscow. However, after the defeat in the Battle of Moscow and the Soviet winter offensive, the Germans were pushed back. In 1942, the Wehrmacht entered Stalingrad. Despite a deadly five-month battle in which the Soviets suffered over 1,100,000 casualties, they achieved victory following the surrender of the last German troops near the Volga River, ultimately pushing German forces out of Russia by 1944.

In 1943, Karachay Autonomous Oblast was dissolved by Joseph Stalin (1878–1953), General Secretary of the Communist Party, later Premier, when the Karachays were exiled to Central Asia for their alleged collaboration with the invading Germans in the Great Patriotic War (World War II, 1941–1945), and territory was incorporated into the Georgian SSR.

On 3 March 1944, on the orders of Stalin, the Chechen-Ingush ASSR was disbanded and its population forcibly deported upon the accusations of collaboration with the invaders and separatism. The territory of the ASSR was divided between other administrative units of Russian SFSR and the Georgian SSR.

On 11 October 1944, the Tuvan People's Republic was joined with the Russian SFSR as the Tuvan Autonomous Oblast, becoming an Autonomous Soviet Socialist Republic in 1961.

After reconquering Estonia and Latvia in 1944, the Russian SFSR annexed their easternmost territories around Ivangorod and within the modern Pechorsky and Pytalovsky Districts in 1944–1945.

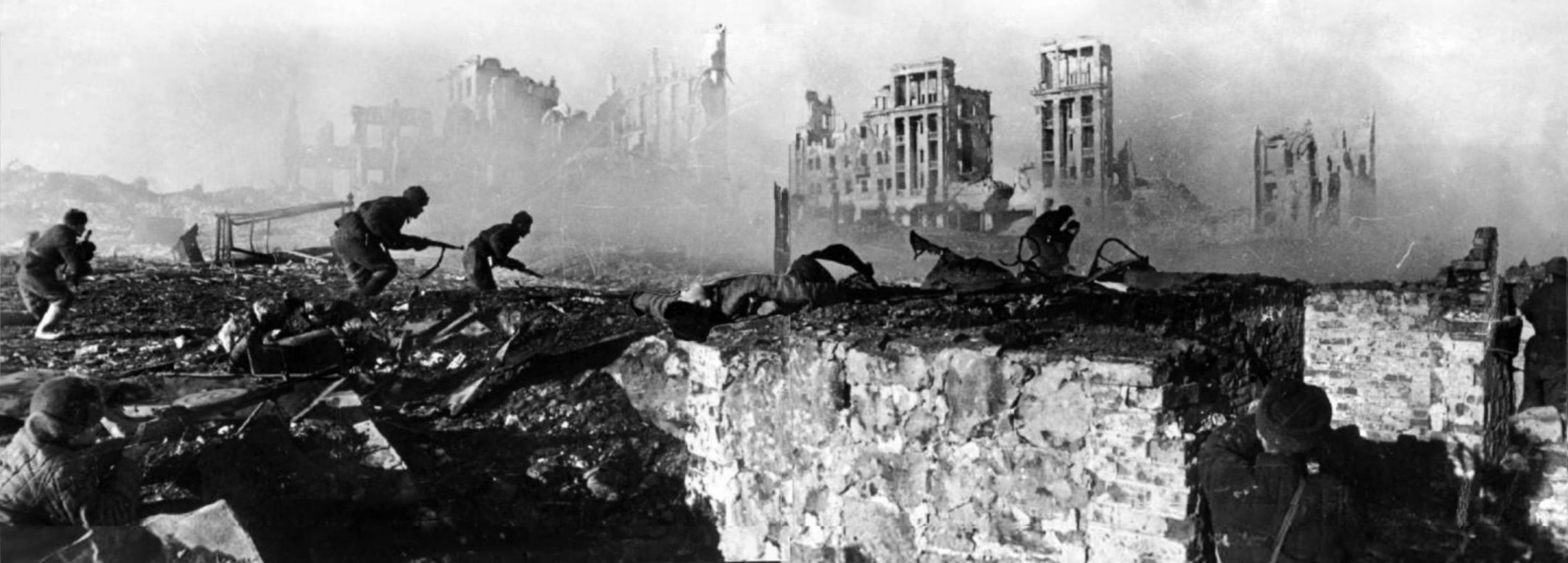
The Battle of Stalingrad, considered by many historians as a decisive turning point of World War II

At the end of World War II Soviet troops of the Red Army occupied southern Sakhalin Island and the Kuril Islands off the coast of East Asia, north of Japan, making them part of the RSFSR. The status of the southernmost Kurils, north of Hokkaido of the Japanese home islands remains in dispute with Japan and the United States following the peace treaty of 1951 ending the state of war.

On 17 April 1946, the Kaliningrad Oblast – the north-eastern portion of the former Kingdom of Prussia, the founding state of the German Empire (1871–1918) and later the German province of East Prussia including the capital and Baltic seaport city of Königsberg – was annexed by the Soviet Union and made part of the Russian SFSR.

=== 1950s ===
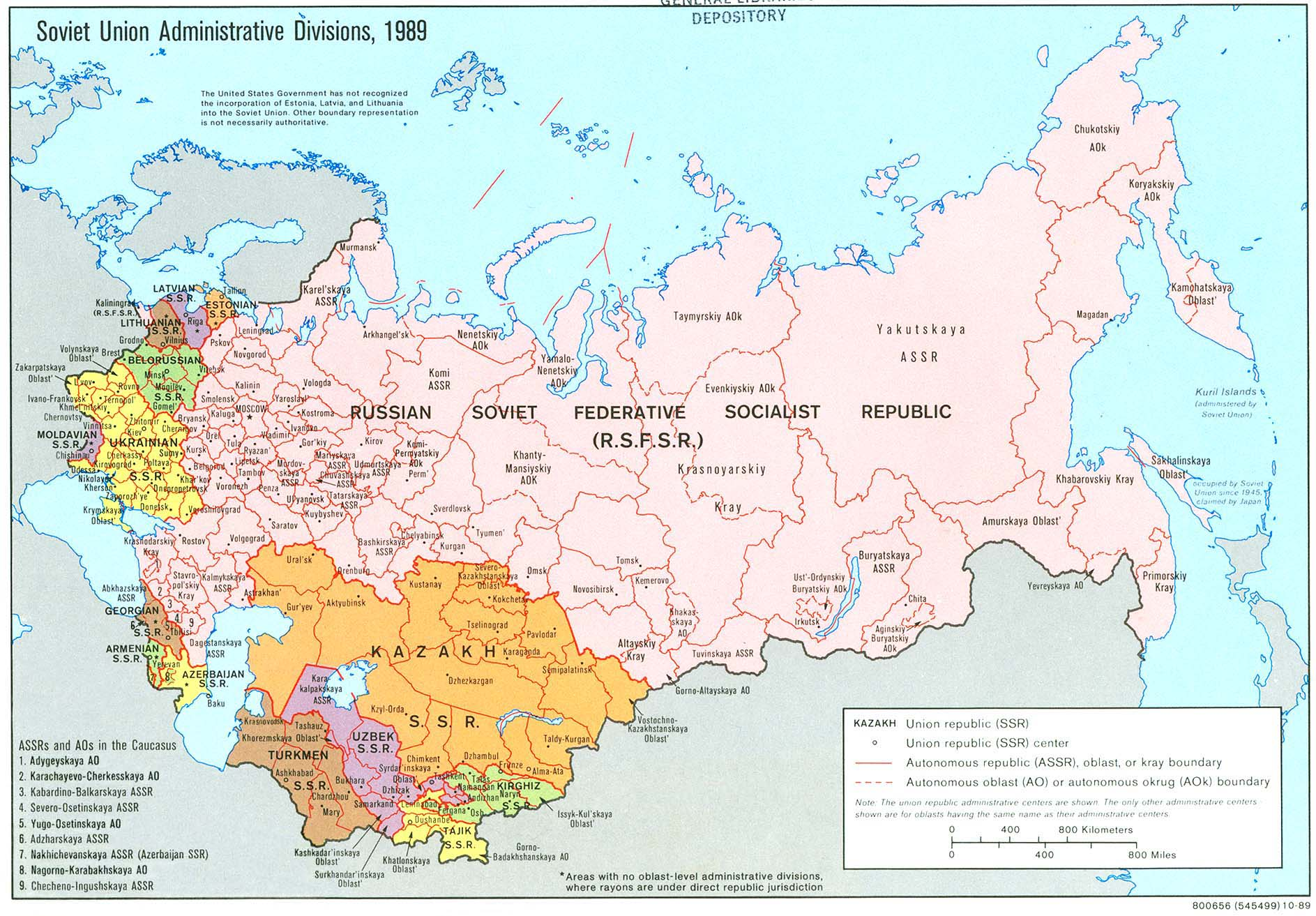
Political divisions of RSFSR (1989)

After the death of Joseph Stalin on 5 March 1953, Georgy Malenkov became the new leader of the USSR. In January 1954, Malenkov (via Presidium of the Supreme Soviet of the Soviet Union issuing a decree) transferred the Crimean Oblast from the Russian SFSR to the Ukrainian SSR.

On 8 February 1955, Malenkov was officially demoted to deputy Prime Minister. As First Secretary of the Central Committee of the Communist Party, Nikita Khrushchev's authority was significantly enhanced by Malenkov's demotion. Under Khrushchev's leadership of the country, the Karelo-Finnish SSR was transferred back to the RSFSR as the Karelian ASSR in 1956.

On 9 January 1957, Karachay Autonomous Oblast and Chechen-Ingush Autonomous Soviet Socialist Republic were restored by Khrushchev and they were transferred from the Georgian SSR back to the Russian SFSR.

=== 1960s–1980s ===
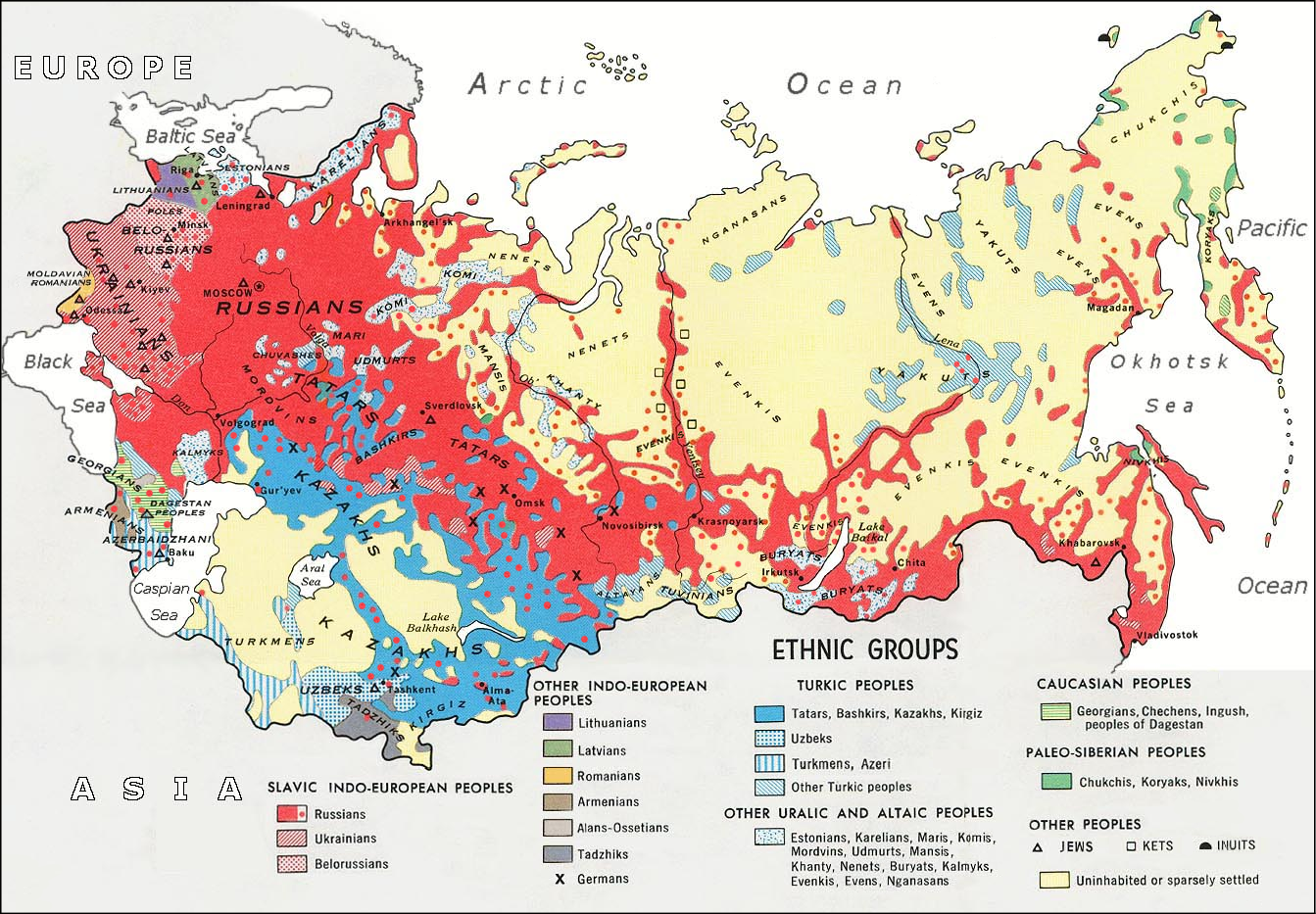
Ethnographic map of the Soviet Union, 1970

In 1964, Nikita Khrushchev was removed from his position of power and replaced with Leonid Brezhnev. Under his rule, the Russian SFSR and the rest of the Soviet Union went through a mass era of stagnation. Even after Brezhnev's death in 1982, the era did not end until Mikhail Gorbachev took power in March 1985 and introduced liberal reforms in Soviet society.

On 12 April 1978, a new Constitution of Russia was adopted.

=== Early 1990s ===
On 29 May 1990, at his third attempt, Boris Yeltsin was elected the chairman of the Supreme Soviet of the Russian SFSR following the first free parliamentary elections from decades. The Congress of People's Deputies of the Republic adopted the Declaration of State Sovereignty of the Russian SFSR on 12 June 1990, which was the beginning of the "War of Laws", pitting the Soviet Union against the Russian Federation and other constituent republics.

Flag adopted by the Russian SFSR national parliament in 1991

On 17 March 1991, an all-Russian referendum created the post of President of the RSFSR and on 12 June, Boris Yeltsin was democratically elected president by popular vote.

During the unsuccessful 1991 Soviet coup d'état attempt of 19–21 August 1991 in Moscow, the capital of the Soviet Union and Russia, Yeltsin strongly supported the President of the Soviet Union, Mikhail Gorbachev. On 23 August, Yeltsin, in the presence of Gorbachev, signed a decree suspending all activity by the Communist Party of the Russian SFSR in the territory of Russia. On 6 November, he went further, banning the Communist Parties of the USSR and the RSFSR in the RSFSR. In the meantime, Yeltsin began taking over what remained of the Soviet government.

On 8 December 1991, at Viskuli near Brest (Belarus), Yeltsin, Ukrainian President Leonid Kravchuk and Belarusian leader Stanislav Shushkevich signed the "Agreement on the Establishment of the Commonwealth of Independent States", known in media as the Belovezh Accords. The document, consisting of a preamble and fourteen articles, began with a declaration that the Soviet Union no longer existed "as a subject of international law and geopolitical reality". However, based on the historical community of peoples and relations between the three states, as well as bilateral treaties, the desire for a democratic rule of law, the intention to develop their relations based on mutual recognition and respect for state sovereignty, the parties agreed to the formation of the Commonwealth of Independent States. On 12 December, the agreement was ratified by the Supreme Soviet of the Russian SFSR by an overwhelming majority: 188 votes for, 6 against and 7 abstentions. The legality of this ratification raised doubts among some members of the Russian parliament, since according to the Constitution of the RSFSR of 1978 consideration of this document was in the exclusive jurisdiction of the Congress of People's Deputies of the RSFSR. On the same day, the Supreme Soviet of the Russian SFSR denounced the Treaty on the Creation of the USSR and recalled all Russian deputies from the Supreme Soviet of the Soviet Union. A number of lawyers believe that the denunciation of the union treaty was meaningless since it became invalid in 1924 with the adoption of the first constitution of the USSR. While the Soviet Constitution did not allow a republic to unilaterally recall its deputies, what was left of the Soviet government had been rendered impotent, and was in no position to object. Although the 12 December vote is sometimes reckoned as the moment that the RSFSR seceded from the collapsing Soviet Union, this is not the case. It appears that the RSFSR took the line that it did not need to follow the secession process delineated in the Soviet Constitution because it was not possible to secede from a country that no longer existed.

On 24 December, Yeltsin informed the Secretary-General of the United Nations that by agreement of the member states of the CIS the Russian Federation would assume the membership of the Soviet Union in all UN organs (including the Soviet Union's permanent seat on the UN Security Council). Russia took full responsibility for all the rights and obligations of the USSR under the Charter of the United Nations, including the financial obligations, and assumed control over its nuclear stockpile and the armed forces; Soviet embassies abroad became Russian embassies. On 25 December – just hours after Gorbachev resigned as president of the Soviet Union – the Russian SFSR was renamed the Russian Federation, reflecting that it was now a sovereign state with Yeltsin assuming the Presidency. That same night, the Soviet flag was lowered from the Kremlin for the last time, and replaced with the tricolor. The Soviet Union officially ceased to exist the next day. The change was originally published on 6 January 1992 (Rossiyskaya Gazeta). According to law, during 1992, it was allowed to use the old name of the RSFSR for official business (forms, seals, and stamps).

On 21 April 1992, the Congress of People's Deputies of Russia approved the renaming of the RSFSR into the Russian Federation, by making appropriate amendments to the Constitution, which entered into force since publication on 16 May 1992.

== Government ==
The Government was known officially as the Council of People's Commissars (1917–1946) and Council of Ministers (1946–1991). The first government was headed by Vladimir Lenin as Chairman of the Council of People's Commissars of the Russian SFSR and the last by Boris Yeltsin as both head of government and head of state under the title of president. The Russian SFSR was controlled by the Communist Party of the Soviet Union until the 1991 August coup, which prompted President Yeltsin to suspend the recently created Communist Party of the Russian Soviet Federative Socialist Republic.

Following the October Revolution, the country initially operated as a de facto revolutionary republic, sometimes described as a Soviet democracy. However, Lenin began quickly dismantling pluralism and consolidating power, turning it into a one-party state by July 1918 following the failed Left SR uprising in Moscow, using it as a pretext for initiating a Red Terror against political dissidents.

The system remained an authoritarian (and, under Stalin, totalitarian) regime until the start of systemic reforms known as perestroika initiated by Mikhail Gorbachev in late 1980s.

Following the abolition of Article 6 of the Soviet Constitution, Soviet Russia held its first semi-free parliamentary elections in March 1990, electing a reformist-democratic leader Boris Yeltsin as a parliamentary speaker and effectively the leader of the country in May 1990. During this period, Russian SFSR turned into a federal parliamentary republic in practice.

After the creation of the post of the President of the Russian SFSR (later changed to President of Russia) in March 1991, the country became a semi-presidential republic following the election of Yeltsin for this place in its first and only presidential elections held in June 1991 (inaugurated in July the same year) up until the collapse of the Soviet Union in December.

=== Autonomous republics within the Russian SFSR ===
- Turkestan ASSR was formed on 30 April 1918 on the territory of the former Turkestan General-Governorate. As part of the delimitation programme of Soviet Central Asia, the Turkestan ASSR along with the Khorezm SSR and the Bukharan PSR were disbanded on 27 October 1924 and replaced by the Soviet Union republics of Turkmen SSR and Uzbek SSR. The latter contained the Tajik ASSR until December 1929, when it too became a full Union republic, the Tajik SSR. The RSFSR retained the newly formed Kara-Kirghiz and the Kara-Kalpak autonomous oblasts. The latter was part of the Kirgiz, then the Kazak ASSR until 1930 when it was directly subordinated to Moscow.
- Bashkir ASSR was formed on 23 March 1919 from several northern districts of the Orenburg Governorate populated by Bashkirs. On 11 October 1990, it declared its sovereignty, as the Bashkir SSR, which in 1992 was renamed the Republic of Bashkortostan.
- Tatar ASSR was formed on 27 May 1920 on the territory of the western two-thirds of the Kazan Governorate populated by Tatars. On 30 October 1990, it declared sovereignty as the Republic of Tatarstan and on 18 October 1991 declared its independence. The Russian constitutional court overturned the declaration on 13 March 1992. In February 1994, a separate agreement was reached with Moscow on the status of Tatarstan as an associate state in Russia with confederate status.
- Kirgiz ASSR was formed on 26 August 1920 from the Ural, Turgay, Semipalatinsk oblasts and parts of Transcaspia, Bukey Horde and Orenburg Governorate populated by Kirgiz-Kaysaks (former name of Kazakh people). Further enlarged in 1921 upon gaining land from Omsk Governorate and again in 1924 from parts of Jetysui Governorate and Syr Darya and Samarkand oblasts. On 19 April 1925, it was renamed Kazak ASSR. (see below)
- Mountain ASSR was formed on 20 January 1921 after the Bolshevik Red Army evicted the short-lived Mountainous Republic of the Northern Caucasus. Initially composed of several national districts, one-by-one these left the republic until 7 November 1924 when the remains of the republic was partitioned into the Ingush Autonomous Oblast, the North Ossetian Autonomous Oblast and the Sunzha Cossack District (all subordinates to the North Caucasus Krai).
- Dagestan ASSR was formed on 20 January 1921 from the former Dagestan Oblast. On 17 September 1991, it declared sovereignty as the Dagestan SSR.
- Crimean ASSR was formed on 18 October 1921 on the territory of Crimean peninsula within the Russian SFSR, following the Red Army's defeat of Baron Wrangel's Army, ending the Russian Civil War in Europe. On 18 May 1944, it was reduced to the status of oblast alongside the criminal deportation of the Crimean Tatars, now recognised as genocide, as collective punishment for alleged collaboration with the German occupation regime in Taurida Subdistrict. On 19 February 1954, the oblast was transferred to the Ukrainian SSR. Re-established on 12 February 1991, it declared sovereignty on 4 September of that year. On 5 May 1992, it declared independence as the Republic of Crimea. On 13 May, the Verkhovna Rada of Ukraine overturned the declaration, but compromised on an Autonomous Republic of Crimea within Ukraine. After the 2014 Ukrainian revolution, a Russian military intervention and a disputed referendum, Crimea was annexed by Russia in March 2014, a move largely considered illegal by the international community.
- Yakut ASSR was formed on 16 February 1922 upon the elevation of the Yakut Autonomous Oblast into an ASSR. On 27 September 1990, it declared sovereignty as the Yakut-Sakha Soviet Socialist Republic. From 21 December 1991, it has been known as the Republic of Sakha (Yakutia).
- Buryat ASSR was formed on 30 March 1923 as due to the merger of the Mongol-Buryat Autonomous Oblast of the RSFSR and the Buryat-Mongol Autonomous Oblast of the Far Eastern Republic. Since September 1937, the Ust-Orda Buryat Autonomous Okrug and the Agin-Buryat Autonomous Okrug were separated from the Buryat-Mongolian ASSR, which were abolished in 2008 by merging with the Irkutsk Oblast and the Chita Oblast, respectively (with the merger of the Chita Oblast and Aga, the Zabaykalsky Krai was formed). Until 7 July 1958 – Mongol-Buryat ASSR. On 27 March 1991, it became the Republic of Buryatia.
- Karelian ASSR was formed on 23 July 1923 when the Karelian Labor Commune was integrated into the RSFSR's administrative structure. On 31 March 1940, it was elevated into a full Union republic as the Karelo-Finnish SSR. On 16 July 1956, it was downgraded in status to that of an ASSR and re-subordinated to RSFSR. It declared sovereignty on 13 October 1991 as the Republic of Karelia.
- Volga German ASSR was formed on 19 December 1924 upon elevation of the Volga German Autonomous Oblast into an ASSR. On 28 August 1941, upon the deportation of Volga Germans to Central Asia, the ASSR was disbanded. The territory was partitioned between the Saratov and Stalingrad Oblasts.
- Kazak ASSR was formed on 19 April 1925 when the first Kirghiz ASSR was renamed and partitioned. Upon the ratification of the new Soviet constitution, the ASSR was elevated into a full Union Republic on 3 December 1936. On 25 October 1990, it declared sovereignty and on 16 December 1991 its independence as the Republic of Kazakhstan.
- Chuvash ASSR was formed on 21 April 1925 upon the elevation of the Chuvash Autonomous Oblast into an ASSR. It declared sovereignty on 26 October 1990 as the Chuvash SSR.
- Kirghiz ASSR was formed on 1 February 1926 upon elevation of the Kirghiz Autonomous Oblast. Upon the ratification of the new Soviet constitution, the ASSR was elevated into a full Union Republic on 3 December 1936. On 12 December 1990, it declared sovereignty as the Republic of Kyrgyzstan and on 31 August 1991 its independence.
- Kara-Kalpak ASSR was formed on 20 March 1932 upon elevation of the Kara-Kalpak Autonomous Oblast into the Kara-Kalpak ASSR; from 5 December 1936 a part of the Uzbek SSR. In 1964, it was renamed the Karakalpak ASSR. It declared sovereignty on 14 December 1990.
- Mordovian ASSR was formed on 20 December 1934 upon the elevation of Mordovian Autonomous Oblast into an ASSR. It declared sovereignty on 13 December 1990 as the Mordovian SSR. Since 25 January 1991, it has been known as the Republic of Mordovia.
- Udmurt ASSR was formed on 28 December 1934 upon the elevation of Udmurt Autonomous Oblast into an ASSR. It declared sovereignty on 20 September 1990. Since 11 October 1991, it has been known as the Udmurt Republic.
- Kalmyk ASSR was formed on 20 October 1935 upon the elevation of Kalmyk Autonomous Oblast into an ASSR. On 27 December 1943, upon the deportation of the Kalmyks, the ASSR was disbanded and split between the newly established Astrakhan Oblast and parts adjoined to Rostov Oblast, Krasnodar Krai and Stavropol Krai. On 9 January 1957, Kalmyk Autonomous Oblast was re-established in its present borders, first as a part of Stavropol Krai and from 19 July 1958 as a part of the Kalmyk ASSR. On 18 October 1990, it declared sovereignty as the Kalmyk SSR.
- Kabardino-Balkar ASSR was formed on 5 December 1936 upon the departure of the Kabardino-Balkar Autonomous Oblast from the North Caucasus Kray. After the deportation of the Balkars on 8 April 1944, the republic is renamed as Kabardin ASSR and parts of its territory transferred to Georgian SSR. Upon the return of the Balkars, the KBASSR is re-instated on 9 January 1957. On 31 January 1991, the republic declared sovereignty as the Kabardino-Balkar SSR and from 10 March 1992 as the Kabardino-Balkarian Republic.
- Northern Ossetian ASSR was formed on 5 December 1936 upon the disbandment of the North Caucasus Kray and its constituent North Ossetian Autonomous Oblast was raised into an ASSR. Declared sovereignty on 26 December 1990 as the North Ossetian SSR.
- Chechen-Ingush ASSR was formed on 5 December 1936 when the North Caucasus Krai was disestablished and its constituent Chechen-Ingush Autonomous Oblast was elevated into an ASSR and subordinated to Moscow. Following the en masse deportation of the Chechens and Ingush, on 7 March 1944 the ChIASSR was disbanded and the Grozny Okrug was temporarily administered by Stavropol Kray until 22 March when the territory was portioned between North Ossetian and Dagestan ASSRs and the Georgian SSR. The remaining land was merged with Stavropol Krays Kizlyar district and organised as Grozny Oblast, which existed until 9 January 1957 when the ChIASSR was re-established though only the southern border's original shape was retained. It declared sovereignty on 27 November 1990 as the Chechen-Ingush Republic. On 8 June 1991, the 2nd Chechen National Congress proclaimed a separate Chechen-Republic (Noxchi-Cho) and on 6 September began a coup which overthrew the Soviet local government. De facto, all authority passed to the self-proclaimed government which was renamed as the Chechen Republic of Ichkeria in early 1993. In response, the western Ingush districts after a referendum on 28 November 1991 were organised into an Ingush Republic which was officially established on 4 June 1992 by decree of Russian President as the Republic of Ingushetia. The same decree de jure created a Chechen republic, although it would be established only on 3 June 1994 and carry out partial governance during the First Chechen War. The Khasavyurt Accord would again suspend the government on 15 November 1996. The present Chechen Republic government was re-established on 15 October 1999.
- Komi ASSR was formed on 5 December 1936 upon the elevation of the Komi (Zyryan) Autonomous Oblast into an ASSR. Declared sovereignty on 23 November 1990 as the Komi SSR and from 26 May 1992 as the Republic of Komi.
- Mari ASSR was formed on 5 December 1936 upon the elevation of the Mari Autonomous Oblast into an ASSR. Declared Sovereignty on 22 December 1990 as the Mari Soviet Socialist Republic (Mari El).
- Tuva ASSR was formed on 10 October 1961 when the Tuva Autonomous Oblast was elevated into an ASSR. On 12 December 1990, it declared sovereignty as the Soviet Republic of Tyva.
- Gorno-Altai ASSR was formed on 25 October 1990 when Gorno-Altai Autonomous Oblast declared sovereignty. Since 3 July 1991, it has been known as the Gorno-Altai SSR.
- Karachayevo-Cherkessian ASSR was formed on 17 November 1990 when Karachay-Cherkess Autonomous Oblast was elevated into an ASSR and instead of Stavropol Krai subordinated directly to the RSFSR. It declared sovereignty on 3 July 1991 as the Karachay-Cherkess SSR.

== Economy ==
In the first years of the existence of the RSFSR, the doctrine of war communism became the starting point of the state's economic activity. In March 1921, at the X Congress of the RCP (B), the country's leadership deemed the policy's goals fulfilled, and the New Economic Policy was introduced at Lenin's suggestion.

After the formation of the Soviet Union, the economy of the RSFSR became an integral part of the economy of the USSR. The economic program of the RSFSR (NEP) was continued in all union republics. The Gosplan (State General Planning Commission) of the RSFSR, which replaced GOELRO, was reorganised into the Gosplan of the USSR. Its early task was to develop a unified national economic plan, based on the electrification plan, and to oversee its overall implementation.

Unlike the previous Russian constitutions, the 1978 Constitution devoted an entire chapter (Chapter II) to the description of the economic system of the RSFSR, which defined the types of property and indicated the state's economic goals.

As noted by Corresponding Member RAS RAS V. I. Suslov, who took part in large-scale studies of the relationship between the economies of the republics of the USSR and the RSFSR in the late Soviet era: "The degree of inequality of economic exchange was very high, and Russia was always the losing side. The product created by Russia largely supported the consumption of other union republics".

== Culture ==
=== National holidays and symbols ===
The public holidays for the Russian SFSR included Defender of the Fatherland Day (23 February), which honored Russian men, especially those serving in the army; International Women's Day (8 March), which combineed the traditions of Mother's Day and Valentine's Day; Spring and Labor Day (1 May); Victory Day; and like all other Soviet republics, the Great October Socialist Revolution (7 November), which was its most popular holiday.

Victory Day was the second most popular holiday in Russia as it commemorated the victory over Nazism in the Great Patriotic War. A huge military parade was annually organised in Moscow on Red Square. Similar parades took place in all major Russian cities and cities with the status of Hero City or City of Military Glory.

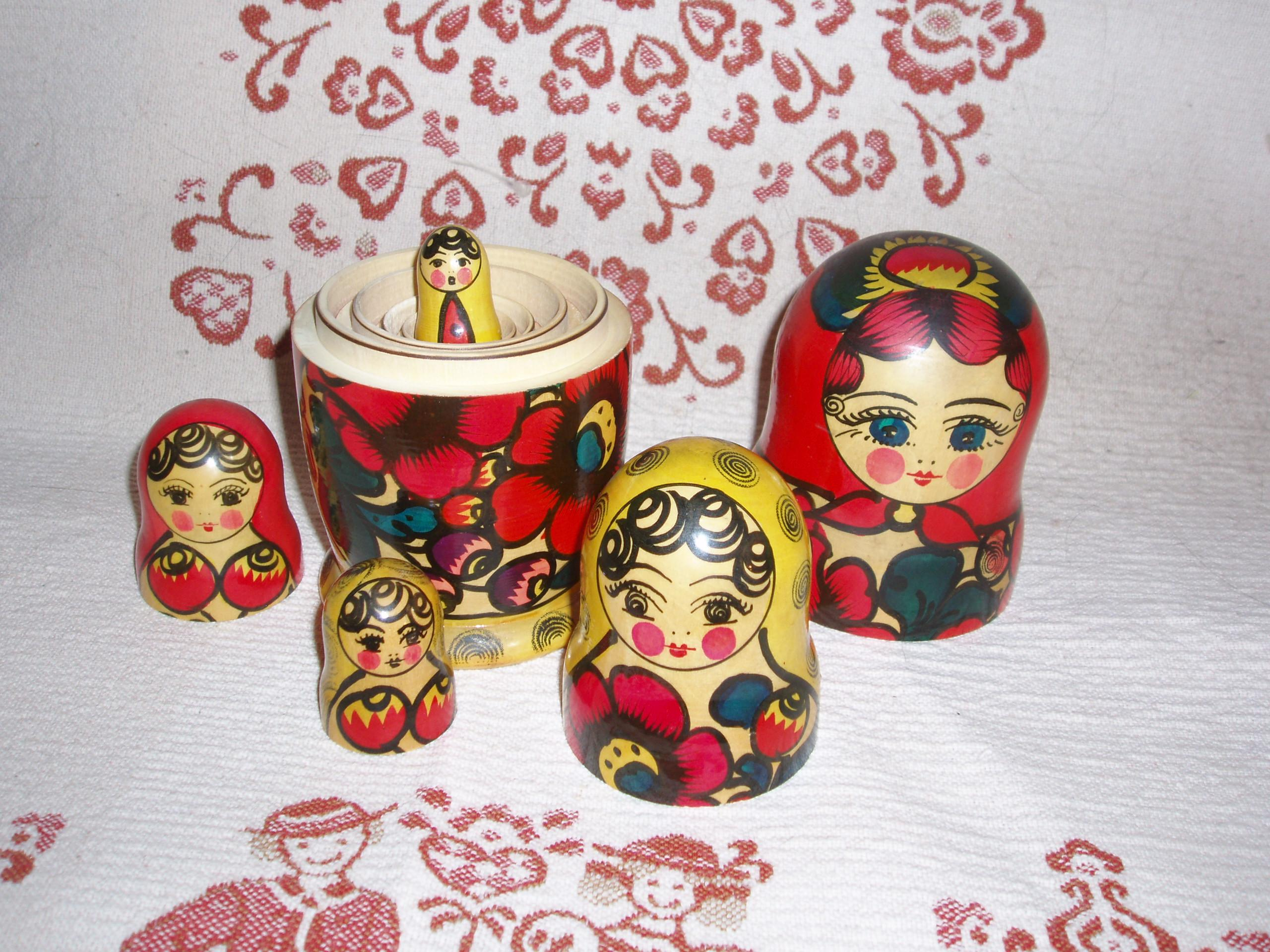
Matryoshka doll taken apart

During its 76-year existence, the Russian SFSR anthem was the same as the Soviet anthem (unlike other republics): The Internationale until 1944 and then the State Anthem of the Soviet Union. In 1990, the RSFSR adopted its own separate anthem called Patrioticheskaya Pesnya, which became the anthem of independent Russia. In 2000, Vladimir Putin re-introduced the Soviet anthem. The motto "Workers of the world, unite!" was commonly used and shared with other Soviet republics. The hammer and sickle and the full Soviet coat of arms are still widely seen in Russian cities as part of architectural decorations. The Soviet red stars are also encountered, often on military equipment and war memorials. The Red Banner continues to be honored, especially the Banner of Victory of 1945.

The Matryoshka doll was a recognisable symbol of the Russian SFSR (and the Soviet Union as a whole), and the towers of Moscow Kremlin and Saint Basil's Cathedral in Moscow were the Russian SFSR's leading architectural icons. Chamomile was the national flower and birch the national tree. The Russian bear was an animal symbol and a national personification of Russia. Though this image has a Western origin, Russians themselves have accepted it together with the indigenous national personification, Mother Russia.

=== Flag history ===
The flag of the Russian SFSR changed numerous times, with the original being a field of red with the Russian name of the republic written on the flag's centre in white. This flag had always been intended to be temporary, as it was changed less than a year after its adoption. The second flag had the letters РСФСР (RSFSR) written in yellow within the canton and encased within two yellow lines forming a right angle. The next flag was used from 1937, notably during World War II. Interesting because it was used until Stalin's death when a major vexillological reform was undertaken within the Soviet Union. This change incorporated an update for all the flags of the Soviet Republics as well as for the flag of the Soviet Union itself. The flag of the Russian SFSR was now a defaced version of the flag of the Soviet Union, with the main difference being a minor repositioning of the hammer and sickle and most notably adding a blue vertical stripe to the hoist. This version of the flag was used from 1954 until 1991, amidst the ongoing collapse of the Soviet Union, when it was changed to a design resembling the original ensign of the Tsardom of Russia and the Russian Empire, with a notable difference of the flag ratio being 1:2 instead of the original 2:3 ratio. After 1993, when the Soviet form of government was officially dissolved in the Russian Federation, the flag was changed to the original civil ensign with its original 2:3 proportions.

1917–1918

1918–1937

1937–1954

1954–1991

1991 (Note: Later used as a national flag of the Russian Federation until 1993.)

== Bibliographies ==
- Bibliography of the Russian Revolution and Civil War
- Bibliography of Stalinism and the Soviet Union
- Bibliography of the post-Stalinist Soviet Union
