= Arbeit und Kampf =

German language magazine (1920–21)

Arbeit und Kampf ('Labour and Struggle') was a German language magazine issued from Marxstadt, Russian SFSR 1920-1921. The magazine carried the slogan "Journal of Political Enlightenment and Socialist Cultural Work in the Red Army" (Zeitschrift für politische Aufklärung und sozialistische Kulturarbeit in der Roten Armee). 21 issues of Arbeit und Kampf appeared. The magazine was founded by Georg Löbsack, who was later named People's Commissar for Education in the Volga German ASSR.
