= Rote Sturmfahne =

- Rote Sturmfahne masthead, October 1938
- Type: Daily
- Editor: Alexander Hasselbach (1934-1937)
- Founded: 1931
- Ceased publication: August 1941
- Political alignment: Communist
- Language: German language
- Headquarters: Marxstadt
- Circulation: ~5,000

Rote Sturmfahne was a German language daily newspaper published from Marxstadt, Volga German Autonomous Soviet Socialist Republic, Soviet Union, and was founded in 1931. It was an organ of the Marxstadt Canton Committee of the All-Union Communist Party (Bolsheviks), the Marxstadt Canton Executive Committee and trade unions. It had a circulation of about 5,000 copies, with the issues containing four pages. During 1934-1937, Alexander Hasselbach was the editor of Rote Sturmfahne, while Eduard Eurich was the executive secretary of the editorial office of Rote Sturmfahne 1938-1941.

The publication was discontinued in August 1941.
