= Zum Kommunismus! =

- Publisher: Volga German regional committee, Russian Young Communist League
- Editor: D. Schmidt
- Founded: 1919
- Ceased publication: 1920
- Political alignment: Communist
- Language: German language
- Headquarters: Marxstadt

Zum Kommunismus! ('For Communism!') was a Volga German communist newspaper. It was the organ of the Volga German regional committee of the Russian Young Communist League. It was published from Marxstadt between 1919 and 1920. D. Schmidt was the editor of Zum Kommunismus!

== See also ==
- Rote Jugend
