= Nachrichten =

Volga German communist newspaper

- Nachrichten masthead, 1920
- Type: Daily (mid-1920s)
- Founder(s): German Commissariat, Saratov
- Founded: 1918
- Ceased publication: 1941
- Political alignment: Communist
- Language: German language
- Headquarters: Saratov (1918–1922), Engels (1922–1941)
- Circulation: 25,000 (1931)

Nachrichten ('News') was a Volga German communist newspaper, published between 1918 and 1941. Nachrichten was the organ of the Communist Party in the Volga German Autonomous Soviet Socialist Republic.

The newspaper was founded under the name Vorwärts ('Forward') by the German Commissariat in Saratov in March 1918. Vorwärts was the first Bolshevik newspaper directed towards the Volga German colonists. It carried the by-line 'Organ of the Socialists in the German Volga territory' (Organ der Sozialisten des deutschen Wolgagebiets). The name was changed to Nachrichten in June 1918, as the Bolsheviks wanted to avoid any association with the SPD organ Vorwärts. The newspaper used Gothic font, but switched to Latin font sometime in the mid-1930s.

In April 1919 the publication Kommunist ('Communist', published from Katharinenstadt since 1916 and initially named Kolonist) was merged into Nachrichten. In the beginning Nachrichten was published alongside Die Wacht, but Die Wacht was closed down in June 1919.

In October 1918 (after the disbanding of the German Commissariat), Nachrichten became the organ of the Russian Communist Party (bolsheviks) Regional Committee (obkom) of the Volga German Labour Commune. The newspaper had a circulation of around 2,500 at this point. It was printed by the Shelgorm & Co. Typographical Association in Saratov. In mid-1919 the printing of Nachrichten was taken over by the Staats-Verlag des Gebietes der Wolgadeutschen. By this point circulation had doubled, fluctuating between 5,000 and 5,400. From 1922 onwards, the newspaper was published in Kosackenstadt. Around the time of the founding of the Volga German ASSR, Nachrichten was published daily.

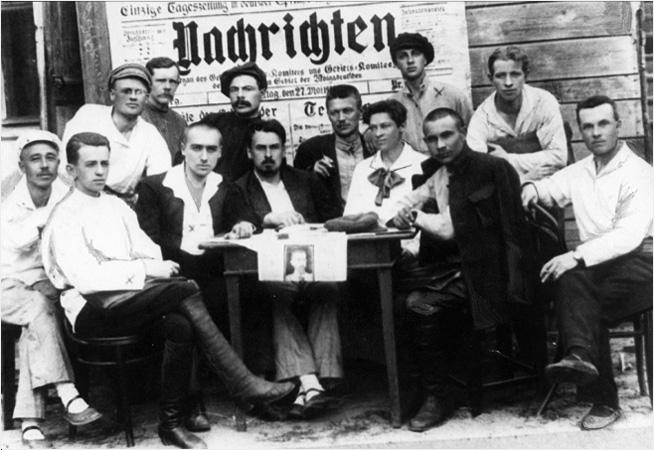
Nachrichten editorial staff, 1923

In 1931 Nachrichten became the joint organ of the Volga German Communist Party obkom and the regional trade union committee. In the same year a shortage of paper made it necessary to limit the frequency of publishing to 18 issues per month and reduce circulation to around 25,000. In 1933 it was converted into the joint organ of the party obkom, the city of Engels (the new name for Kosackenstadt) committee and the Engels city soviet. In 1939 it was named the organ of the Volga German ASSR Supreme Soviet, the party obkom, the Engels city party committee and the Engels city council of people's deputies.
