= Christ the King Church =

Christ the King Church may refer to:

== Denominations ==
- Protestant Church of Christ the King, an African Reformed denomination

== Buildings and congregations ==
=== Australia ===
- Church of Christ the King, Tennant Creek, Northern Territory
- Catholic Church of Christ the King, Taralga, New South Wales

=== China ===
- Christ the King Church, Shenzhen
- Church of Christ the King, Xiamen

=== Denmark ===
- Christ the King Church, Nuuk, Greenland

=== Iceland ===
- Christ the King Cathedral (Reykjavík)

=== India ===
- Christ the King Church, Jog Falls, Karnataka
- Christ the King Church, Dasarapalli, Tamil Nadu
- Christ the King Church, Palacode, Tamil Nadu
- Christ the King Church, venur, karnataka

=== Ireland ===
- Church of Christ the King, Turners Cross, Cork

=== Latvia ===
- Christ the King Church, Riga

=== Lithuania ===
- Cathedral of Christ the King, Panevėžys

=== Malta ===
- Christ the King Church, Paola

=== Nauru ===
- Christ the King Church, Arubo

=== Russia ===
- Christ the King Church, Marks

=== Sweden ===
- Christ the King Church, Gothenburg

=== Uganda ===
- Christ the King Catholic Church, Kampala

=== United Kingdom ===
- Church of Christ the King, Bloomsbury, London
- Christ the King Church, Wimbledon Park, London
- Church of Christ the King, Birkenhead, Merseyside

=== United States ===
- Christ the King Church (Fort Smith, Arkansas)
- Christ the King Church (Larkspur, Colorado), designated an anti-LGBT hate group by the Southern Poverty Law Center
- Christ the King School and Church, Lexington, listed on the National Register of Historic Places in Kentucky
- Christ the King Presbyterian Church, Cambridge, Massachusetts
- Christ the King Parish, Ludlow, Massachusetts
- Christ the King's Church (Bronx), New York
- Church of Our Lord, Christ the King, Cincinnati, first Catholic church internationally dedicated to Christ under the title of "King"

== See also ==
- Christ the King Cathedral (disambiguation)
