= Canton (administrative division) =

Type of administrative division of a country

A canton is a type of administrative division of a country. In general, cantons are relatively small in terms of area and population when compared with other administrative divisions, such as counties, departments, or provinces. Internationally, the most politically important cantons are the Swiss cantons. As the constituents of the Swiss Confederation, theoretically and historically, they are semi-sovereign states.

The term is derived from the French word canton, meaning "corner" or "district" (from which "cantonment" is also derived).

== In specific countries ==
Cantons exist or previously existed in the following countries:

- Cantons of Belgium
- Cantonal Government of Bohol
- Cantons of Bolivia
- Cantons of Bosnia and Herzegovina: federal units of the Federation of Bosnia and Herzegovina
- Canada: Canadian French equivalent for the English word "township", since the translation municipalité is already used for a different level of government (see township).
  - Cantons of Quebec
- Cantons of Costa Rica: national second order subdivision of the first order Provinces. Cantons are further subdivided into the third order Districts. Each canton has its own municipality, or local government.
- Cantons of Ecuador: subdivisions below the provinces of Ecuador.
- Cantons of El Salvador: divisions of a municipality outside the more urban caserios, which border the town or city. Cantones can be thought as the more rural parts of a city or town, generally far from the actual urban population.
- Cantons of France: a subdivision of arrondissements and départements, grouping several communes.
- Cantons of Lebanon: unofficial militias and factions during the Lebanese Civil War and afterwards. Most areas have been returned to Lebanese government control.
- Cantons of Luxembourg: first order administrative subdivisions
- Cantonal Government of Negros: short-lived provisional government in the Visayas during the Filipino-American Wars in the 19th–20th centuries Republic of Negros.
- Cantons of Rojava (Western Kurdistan, Syria)
- Cantons of Switzerland: each a semi-sovereign state within Switzerland.
- Cantons of Togo: Subdivisions of Togo's prefectures, and further divided into villages.
- subdivisions of vingtaines in Jersey
- subdivisions of the parishes of Guernsey

=== In former countries ===
- Cantons of Prussia: military enrollment districts between 1733 and 1813
- Cantons of Eastern Rumelia, the subdivisions below the departments.
- Cantons of the Soviet Union, subdivisions of several autonomous regions of the country before 1941.
- In the Republic of New Granada, cantons were subdivisions below the provinces.
- In the First Spanish Republic in 1873, "Cantonalists" took over the city of Cartagena, Spain, a major Spanish Navy base, and declared the city independent (see Cantonal Rebellion).
