= American Volga Relief Society =

German-American non-governmental organization

The American Volga Relief Society was a German American non-governmental organization that provided relief and supplies to ethnically German settlements in the area around the Volga River. The group was active following World War I, during the period between 1921 and 1924. The organization officially disbanded in 1926, though private donations continued until the 1930s.

== Historical context ==
Following the Russian Revolution and subsequent Bolshevik seizure of the government in 1917, Vladimir Lenin became the de facto leader of the newly formed Soviet Union. One of the first acts of the Lenin government was to confiscate and redistribute peasant lands in order to institute a system of collective farming. In the Volga region, farmers were required to relinquish their seed wheat, preventing them from planting wheat for the following year and effectively destroying the potential harvest. The Saratov and Samara provinces, along the Volga River, saw ethnic Germans resisting the seizure of peasant land and seed wheat. The Lenin government responded by ordering complete grain requisition and an extermination campaign. Along with this, crops failed due a drought, and by 1921, the region was being devastated by famine, starvation, and war.

This part of the country, along with Ukraine, was one of the largest grain-producing regions, and the loss of both labor power and collective farms would have been a blow to the new Bolshevik government. For fear of an increased number of rebellions, the Bolshevik government requested international famine relief organizations into the area, despite several years of denying a crisis. Many of the American relief efforts were coordinated under Herbert Hoover's American Relief Administration, which coordinated and oversaw non-governmental relief operations. The privately funded AVRS was a part of this organizational relief campaign of the United States federal government.

=== The famine ===
The Russian famine of 1921–1922 generated an enormous amount of media coverage in the United States, and public support for the victims of the famine was high. Reports of conditions from family members and journalists in the Volga region pointed suggested a bleak picture with an emphasis on the sensational, particularly as regards the deaths of children and the rumors of cannibalism among people living in remote areas of the Soviet Union.

The Russian famine also generated a number of diseases, including typhus, that further decimated the population. In total, estimates suggest approximately five million people perished all over Russia during the famine.

== German Russians in the Volga region ==
Specifically in the Volga, the Volga Germans living in the region numbered close to 750,000 people in 1914; by 1920, that number had dwindled to about 450,000 in a combination of death and flight. When the famine hit, the years 1921–1922 had the highest death toll, with approximately 170,000 deaths German settlements along the Volga River.

After the Revolution and the end of the famine, the German population became one of the largest ethnic minority groups in Russia. In 1924, the Soviet government granted the German Russians a degree of autonomy as the Volga German Autonomous Soviet Socialist Republic. Ethnic Germans had migrated to this region under Catherine the Great, and were allowed to maintain cultural traditions such as religious practices and clothing. During the famine, however, many of these ethnic Germans fled to the United States, Canada, England, and other Western states, seeking refuge from the risk of starvation. Others left for the cities and other towns of Russia and Europe, hoping to escape the devastation. Many of these expatriates left family behind in Russia, although many of them continued to have contact with their relatives and friends who remained in the Volga region.

=== Formation of the AVRS ===
The flight of German Russians to the United States resulted in a large German American population. Beginning in 1920, following the First World War, many German Americans received letters from family members still living near the Volga. Upper and middle class Americans considered the possibilities of aiding the Russians fleeing the number regime. Relief efforts began to crop up, and efforts to send aid to various regions of Russia dealing with famine or starvation, particularly from churches and other religious organizations.

Two organizations independently formed to specifically support ethnic Germans in the Volga River area: George Repp's Volga Relief Society in Portland, Oregon, and the Central States Volga Relief Society, in Lincoln, Nebraska. Both groups solicited donations and assistance from American Volga German communities to aid their families left in Russia during the famine, which they then used to distribute a variety of items and cash assistance to Volga communities in Russia. On November 4, 1922, the two organizations joined to form the American Volga Relief Society (AVRS).

By the end of 1922, the newly formed AVRS began soliciting funds from Volga Germans living in California, Nebraska, Colorado, Washington, Montana, Oklahoma, Illinois, Kansas, and other states with large German-Russian populations.

== Areas of operation ==
The AVRS operated primarily in the Saratov and Samara provinces in what would eventually become the German Volga Republic. The group also had operations in the Samara-Koshki German settlement area, and German settlements in Omsk in Siberia. The group would later spread operations to Germany itself, sending donations to orphanages and missions.

== Scope of assistance ==
According to some estimates, the AVRS managed to raise over a million dollars for relief efforts, and it along with other relief efforts may have reached several thousand individuals living in German Volga sentiments. The AVRS sent material resources that varied from community to community, but was at least partially responsible for the large-scale effort coordinated by the ARA, other religious groups, and a number of additional private actors that fed and provided assistance to perhaps 10 million individuals living in famine-struck parts of Russia during the early years of the Soviet Union. Despite the efforts of the AVRS, the ARA, and other non-governmental organizations, a large number of the population suffered under the final days of the famine.

=== Solicitation ===
Starting in 1921, the organization sent letters to various communities along the river to inquire about the number of villages before and after the war, livestock and equipment before and after the war, the number of people in need of assistance, and the kinds of assistance that communities needed the most, which included from clothing, foodstuffs, livestock, or farm equipment. These letters also requested that each community elect a local leader to organize and coordinate local distribution of materials. These letters were the starting point for a longer negotiation about the needs of locals and the resources of the AVRS.

=== Clothing ===
The majority of requests were for of clothing and footwear. Clothing was a particularly important, given the cold winter of the areas in which the AVRS was operating. After two years of starvation and famine before relief organizations arrived, clothing, shoes, and stockings were necessary to prevent hypothermia, but also to simply clothe the people in items that were not rags. Some communities also specifically requested bedding to replace old bedding that was no longer functional.

=== Food ===
Despite the famine, few communities requested foodstuffs or named food as a primary need. Some specific requests were made on behalf of the sick, including rice, cocoa, sugar, tea, and fat. Nonetheless, a large number of the donations and supplies that the AVRS delivered to famine-struck regions included foodstuffs. The group distributed these goods, along with wheat, rye, potatoes, yeast, meat, and millet. The grains were particularly important given the failure and confiscation of wheat crops. In many cases, food supplies ran low, and occasionally the sickest or "most in need" individuals (rather than entire families) would receive foodstuffs and other supplies.

=== Agricultural needs ===
Many letters from Volga communities to the AVRS also requested livestock, seeds, and farm equipment to revitalize agriculture and end the famine. Seed potatoes were also provided to several communities. Agriculture would have played a vital role in supporting the Volga community, particularly in smaller settlements in remote areas with little access to transit.

=== Building materials ===
Some communities also requested building materials, or money to purchase materials to repair religious structures like chapels and churches. The AVRS also distributed firewood for the poor.

=== Medicine ===
Medical needs were high in a starving society. Requests for doctors and medications for "the sick" were common, and the AVRS attempted to deliver essential medical supplies to regions that requested them.

=== Other materials ===
The AVRS distributed a number of materials that fall outside of these categories, including

- sewing needles
- writing pens
- thread
- a weaving loom to a widow

=== Reception ===
The vast majority of Volga Germans who received material support from the relief efforts of the AVRS sent letters of gratitude, or had others who could send gratitude on their behalf. A large number of records addressed to the AVRS include both an expression of gratitude and a request for additional aid.

That said, there is little in the historical record to give any insight into how the Soviet government responded to particular forms of aid, particularly building materials for religious institutions, which would have been outlawed during the early years of the Soviet era.

Additionally, sources show little insight into the public perception of groups like the AVRS, much less the organization itself, that indicate either public approval or disapproval of the efforts of the AVRS. In contrast, relief organizations that originated in elite circles saw some public praise of relief efforts in Russia and surrounding areas that supported refugees.

== Organizational leadership ==
The first president of the AVRS was Dr. H. P. Weckesser of Lincoln. Jacob Volz of York, Nebraska, was the on-site representative of the organization in Russia. Hebert Hoover headed the American Relief Association through the United States federal government, which coordinated with private non-governmental organizations to facilitate relief to the region. Weckesser died in 1923 relief efforts, and vice president John Rohrig took over operations in his wake.

=== George Repp ===
George Repp was a member of the Zion Congregational Church in Portland, Oregon. At one of the earliest meetings of the Volga Relief Society, the organization selected Repp to work with the ARA on the ground in Russia. A businessman, Repp sacrificed his time and family to travel to Russia to work with refugees and relief efforts for a year. He arrived in Russia on October 10, 1921, and began making arrangements for food and supply distribution, organizing local committees, and documenting conditions in the area. He returned to the United States in September 1922 and continued to organize relief efforts from the U.S.

=== Jacob Volz ===
Jacob Volz took on the task of coordinating relief efforts from Russia between 1922 and 1923. Volz was faced with the difficult task of choosing which families and occasionally, which individual members of families, were most in need, and distributing materials accordingly. He kept detailed records of his distributions and observations, sending receipts back to the AVRS regularly. He also distributed mail and collected additional information regarding addresses and locations of ethnic Germans receiving aid in the Volga. Volz's letters indicate occasional challenges to effective aid distribution – lost packages or illegible receipts contributed to the confusion. Volz's father died while he was working in Russia, and he received news of the death from letters organized by the AVRS.

=== Local relief coordinators ===
AVRS sent letters to villages and communities and asked for each to elect a leader to coordinate relief efforts locally. The job entailed managing correspondence with the AVRS, passing along requests for aid, distribution, and reporting back how the goods were distributed and to whom. The men elected to this job were literate and able to communicate independently with the AVRS, and their letters and requests are housed at the AVRS Archive in Nebraska, and a number are listed here.

- Eduard Föll was the coordinator in Malousensk.
- Johann Jacob Stumpf coordinated relief efforts in Neu-Warenburg
- David Schneider and Philipp Kisselman coordinated relief efforts in Oberdorf.
- Jacob Velte and Jacob Reichert led relief efforts in Dietel and Oleschna.
- Friedrich Friedrichovich Schäfer coordinated relief efforts in Kana in the Pallasovka region.
- Friedrich Groh coordinated relief efforts in Kraft.

== Disbanding ==
Little record exists of why the AVRS disbanded. One possible explanation that goes unaddressed in the documents of the AVRS is the formation of the Volga German Autonomous Soviet Socialist Republic, for which the Soviet government ceded partial formal control to the region to govern its own affairs. This largely consisted of the ability of Volga Germans to practice their own religion, as well as to govern their own affairs under the authority of the Soviet government. The famine ended after 1922, though the Volga likely spent several years recovering from the aftermath, making the organization's work a useful contribution to the rebuilding efforts following the famine, the First World War, and the revolution. The ARA itself closed its offices in 1923, giving the oversight organization and federal relief efforts a shorter lifespan than at least one of its constitutive organizations.

=== Donors ===
An extensive catalogue of donors exists in the historical archive of the AVRS. A blank form was sent to several religious communities who considered donations. Perhaps the greatest amount of money however, was collected from donors who bought "subscriptions" – that is, they were able to contribute small or, in some cases, large sums of money to the relief effort. Around four hundred individuals scattered across Nebraska and other central states had continuous monthly donations for a year or more, according to the historical record.

== AVRS and other relief efforts ==
Around the time of the transition to communism time, a large number of people living in newly communist territories left and fled to surrounding areas. Many went to Constantinople, and American relief efforts also went to the areas surrounding the new Soviet Union. American elites donated to refugee efforts in various parts of Eastern Europe and non-governmental relief efforts began to support the lives and livelihoods, particularly artistic endeavors, of the refugees. The AVRS was one of a number of private organizations that was founded by middle class Americans, and was one of the organizations that relied primarily on religious groups rather than soliciting funds from advertising or others means. Other active religious organizations at the time included the Quakers, the Mennonites, and Jews, who led parallel fundraising and resource distribution efforts with the AVRS and the ARA.

=== Relationship with the American government ===
The American Relief Administration (ARA) was one of the first governmental forms of relief for the government, and was the primary governmental oversight organization of the AVRS. In addition to national support from the United States federal government, individuals from other Western states including England and Canada sought advice on how to contribute to relief efforts in the German Volga region, along with a number of other areas hit hard by the famine.
