= List of Baltic German recipients of the military Order of Lāčplēsis =

This is a list of Baltic German recipients of the military Order of Lāčplēsis. The list consists of 55 recipients of Baltic German extraction, of whom 52 were Latvian citizens at the time they were awarded the Order of Lāčplēsis. The Order was named after the Latvian epic hero, Lāčplēsis. As a young man, Lāčplēsis kills a bear with his bare hands and thus the order is also known as the Order of the Bearslayer.

== A ==
- Arved Ahlberg (Latvian: Arvīds Ālbergs), born 7 May 1900, Riga - died 12 February 1941, Łódź. Order no. 1551, 3rd class, awarded 1922.
- Theodor Audring (Latvian: Teodors Audrings), born 1 July 1900, Aizpute - died 8 November 1947, Daugavpils. Order no. 1554, 3rd class, awarded 1922.

== B ==
- Wolfgang Behling (Latvian: Volfgangs Bēhlings), born 2 March 1900, Riga - died 13 June 1950, Schwerin. Order no. 1556, 3rd class, awarded 1922.
- Erich Berg (Latvian: Ērihs Bergs), born 1 November 1900, Riga - died 19 October 1978, Bremen. Order no. 1558, 3rd class, awarded 1922.
- Werner Blumenbach (Latvian: Verners Blūmenbahs), born 4 June 1900, Riga - died 5 December 1990, Zwickau. Order no. 1563, 3rd class, awarded 1922.
- Theodor Brandt (Latvian: Teodors Brants), born 28 August 1896, Moscow - died 27 August 1981, Bodenwerder. Order no. 1047, 3rd class, awarded 1921.
- Arthur Baron von Buxhoeveden (Latvian: Arturs fon Bukshēvedens), born 29 March 1882, Murratz - died 27 October 1964, Karlsruhe. Order no. 1742, 3rd class, awarded 1925.

== D ==
- Konrad Deckert (Latvian: Konrāds Dekerts), born 15 August 1891, Irši Parish - died 1942, Solikamsk. Order no. 1985, 3rd class, awarded 1926.

== E ==
- John Ehwing (Latvian: Džons Ēvings), born 14 March 1890, Riga - died 6 June 1940, Poznań. Order no. 1046, 3rd class, awarded 1921.
- Georg Erhardt (Latvian: Juris Erhards), born 19 November 1895, Irši Parish - died 6 February 1935, Riga, buried Brothers' Cemetery. Order no. 1379, 3rd class, awarded 1922.

== F ==
- Gerhard Fehst (Latvian: Gerhards Fēsts), born 11 November 1898, (Estonia) - died 1982, Heidelberg. Order no. 1547, 3rd class, awarded 1922.
- Ernst Fiebig (Latvian: Ernests Fībihs), born 6 December 1898, Rivne - no further information. Order no. 313, 3rd class, awarded 1920.
- Hamilkar Baron von Foelkersahm (Latvian: Hamilkārs Felkerzāms), born 7 September 1893, Adsel - died 12 November 1982, Waldkraiburg. Order no. 327, 3rd class, awarded 1920.
- Jakob Freiberg (Latvian: Jēkabs Freibergs), changed surname 1940 to Kalnietis, born 17 January 1900, Riga - died 3 December 1987, Jelgava, buried Baloži Cemetery. Order no. 160, 3rd class, awarded 1920.

== G ==
- Albert Gebhardt (Latvian: Alberts Gebhards), born 22 October 1896, Riga - died December 1945, Poznań. Order no. 1560, 3rd class, awarded 1922.
- Theodor Goertz (Latvian: Teodors Gercs), born 10 May 1900, Warsaw - no further information. Order no. 440, 3rd class, awarded 1920.
- Wilhelm Grissel (Latvian: Vilhelms Grisels), born 6 May 1898, Riga - died 29 December 1958, Frankfurt am Main. Order no. 1548, 3rd class, awarded 1922.
- Constantin von Gutzeit (Latvian: Konstantīns Gutceits), born 14 October 1891, Ilzene parish - died 7 October 1981, Barsinghausen. Order no. 1561, 3rd class, awarded 1922.

== J ==
- Harry Janson (Latvian: Harijs Jansons), born 13 January 1896, Riga - died 27 May 1992, Buenos Aires. Order no. 1048, 3rd class, awarded 1921.

== K ==
- Wilhelm Johannes Arwed Max Kattchée (Lithuanian: Maksimas Katche; Latvian: Maksims Kathe), born 5 November 1879, Joniškis - died 10 June 1933, Biržai. Order no. 1860, 3rd class, awarded 1924.
- Erich Kemmerer (Latvian: Ērihs Kemerers), born 27 November 1897, Neuhoffrungstal, Crimea - died 2 April 1942, Eastern Front. Order no. 1546, 3rd class, awarded 1922.
- Woldemar Klein (Latvian: Voldemārs Kleins), born 30 May 1893, Pinsk - died 17 October 1919, Bolderāja. Order no. 1255, 3rd class, awarded posthumously 1922.
- Arthur Heinrich von Koehler (Latvian: Artūrs Heinrihs Kēlers), born 25 November 1894, Džūkste parish - died 21 November 1941, Kirov Oblast (Prison camp Vyatlag). Order no. 337, 3rd class, awarded 1920.
- Arthur Krasting (Latvian: Artūrs Krastings), born 25 November 1887, Pärnu - died 22 June 1952, Heilbronn. Order no. 1557, 3rd class, awarded 1922.

== L ==
- Leo Lankowsky (Latvian: Leo Lankovskis), born 23 June 1893, Jelgava - died 5 January 1970, Hamburg. Order no. 1545, 3rd class, awarded 1922.
- Heinrich Lietz (Latvian: Heinrihs Līcs), born 31 January 1898, Riga - died 4 August 1982, Stuttgart. Order no. 236, 3rd class, awarded 1920.
- Gotthard Lindenberg (Latvian: Gothards Lindenbergs), born 26 June 1894, Allaži parish - died 8 June 1960, Schlangenbad. Order no. 1552, 3rd class, awarded 1922.
- Herbert Linge (Latvian: Herberts Linge), born 9 July 1897, Kuldīga - no further information. Order no. 1559, 3rd class, awarded 1922.
- Harry Lutz (Latvian: Harijs Lucs), born 23 June 1900, Riga - died 6 March 1966, Osnabrück. Order no. 484, 3rd class, awarded 1921.

== M ==
- Arnold Baron von Maydell (Latvian: Arnolds Maidelis), born 15 July 1884, Põltsamaa - no further information. Order no. 1302, 3rd class, awarded 1922.

== P ==
- Rudolf Peitan (Latvian: Rūdolfs Peitāns), born 20 January 1894, Riga - died 8 July 1922, Riga. Order no. 481, 3rd class, awarded 1921.
- Georg Pernaux (Latvian: Georgs Pērno), born 19 March 1900, Pļaviņas - died 21 April 1990, Bochum. Order no. 365, 3rd class, awarded 1920.

== R ==
- Friedrich Rathfelder (Latvian: Fridrihs Rātfelders), born 8 March 1897, Riga - no further information. Order no. 377, 3rd class, awarded 1920.
- Nikolaus Richter (Latvian: Nikolajs Rihters), born 10 April 1897, Riga - died 29 January 1960, Berndorf, Leipzig. Order no. 400, 3rd class, awarded 1920.
- Karl Ritter (Latvian: Kārlis Riters), born 12 November 1895, Koknese Parish - died 27 April 1920, Rītupe, buried Koknese Cemetery. Order no. 756, 3rd class, awarded posthumously 1921.
- Friedrich Roehsler (Latvian: Fridrihs Rēslers), born 26 June 1889, Riga - died January 1945, Poznań. Order no. 636, 3rd class, awarded 1921.

== S ==
- Felix von Samson-Himmelstjerna (Latvian: Fēlikss Samsons-Himmelšerna), born 29 August 1885, Valmiera - died 26 March 1967, Stuttgart. Order no. 1550, 3rd class, awarded 1922.
- Helmut Scheinpflug (Latvian: Helmūts Šeinpflūgs), born 20 November 1896, Liepupe parish - died 1960, Weißenau, Friedrichshafen. Order no. 1549, 3rd class, awarded 1922.
- Heinrich Schmidt (Latvian: Heinrihs Šmits), born 2 February 1900, Riga - no further information. Order no. 1562, 3rd class, awarded 1922.
- Wilhelm Seelert (Latvian: Vilhelms Zēlerts), born 8 August 1888, Tukums - died 16 June 1963, Bitterfeld. Order no. 533, 3rd class, awarded 1921.
- Johann Sengbusch (Latvian: Johans Zengbušs), born 22 July 1900, Paide - died 10 January 1942, Solikamsk. Order no. 1808, 3rd class, awarded 1925.
- Theodor Sieffers (Latvian: Teodors Zieferss), born 3 November 1892, Sauka parish - died January 1945, Janowiec Wielkopolski. Order no. 1535, 3rd class, awarded 1922.
- Hans Siegmund (Latvian: Hanss Zīgmunds), born 25 September 1890, Liepāja - no further information. Order no. 273, 3rd class, awarded 1920.
- Max Specht (Latvian: Maksis Špehts), born 8 November 1898, Limbaži - died 26 May 1980, Hamburg. Order no. 1553, 3rd class, awarded 1922.
- Alexander Starck (Latvian: Aleksandrs Starks), born 27 March 1896, Riga - no further information. Order no. 1564, 3rd class, awarded 1922.
- Johann Stender (Latvian: Johans Stenders), born 19 July 1899, Subate - died 7 July 1974, Wiedenbrück, Bielefeld. Order no. 292, 3rd class, awarded 1920.

== T ==
- Erich Taube (Latvian: Erihs Taube), born 31 December 1900, Riga - died 20 September 1978, Kiel. Order no. 231, 3rd class, awarded 1920.
- Felix Treu (Latvian: Fēlikss Treijs), born 15 February 1895, Riga - died 10 May 1976, Straubing. Order no. 347, 3rd class, awarded 1920.

== U ==
- Alex Ucke (Latvian: Aleksis Uke), born 21 April 1898, Bēne parish - died 22 August 1966, Lüneburg. Order no. 304, 3rd class, awarded 1920.

== W ==
- Harry Waeber (Latvian: Harijs Vēbers), born 15 May 1894, Jēkabpils - died 28 March 1947, Güstrow. Order no. 441, 3rd class, awarded 1920.
- Emar Waldmann (Latvian: Emārs Valdmanis), born 22 August 1896, Riga - no further information. Order no. 579, 3rd class, awarded 1921.
- Platon Wendt (Latvian: Platons Vendts), born 18 October 1886, Riga - died 23 January 1961, New York City. Order no. 595, 3rd class, awarded 1920.
- Karl Wichmann (Latvian: Kārlis Vihmanis), born 22 January 1888, Riga - no further information. Order no. 1367, 3rd class, awarded 1922.
- Lothar Wilde von Wildemann (Latvian: Lotārs Vilde-Vildemants), born 25 May 1900, Daugavpils - died 28 January 1944, Narva. Order no. 1719, 3rd class, awarded 1924.

== Z ==
- Axel Zakowsky (Latvian: Aksels Cakovkis), born 1 November 1888, Sarkaņi parish - died 12 May 1939, Riga, buried Riga Forest Cemetery. Order no. 1565, 3rd class, awarded 1924.

== See also ==
- Baltic Germans

== Notes ==
=== Bibliography ===
- Adolphi, Renate (2001). 800 Jahre - unser gemeinsames Riga : Beiträge deutschbaltischer Autoren zum 800-jährigen Jubiläum der Stadt Riga 2001 (in German). Lüneburg: Carl-Schirren-Gesellschaft. ISBN 978-3-923149-33-9. OCLC 248859528.
- Priedītis, Ērichs Ēriks (1996). Latvijas Valsts apbalvojumi un Lāčplēši (in Latvian). Riga: Junda. ISBN 9984-01-020-1. OCLC 38884671.
