= Socialist Homeland is in Danger! =

Sovnarkom decree of danger

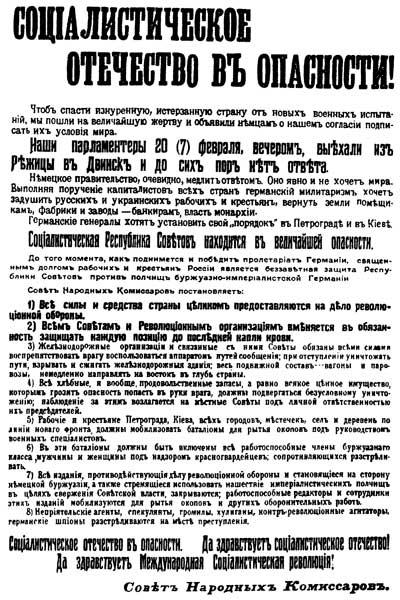

Sovnarkom (SNK) of the RSFSR
- Enacted: February 18, 1918
- Status: Repealed

Socialist Homeland is in Danger! (Russian: Социалистическое отечество в опасности!) is one of the most famous decrees of the Sovnarkom, written as a decree-appeal. The decree was published in February 1918 in response to the German attack on Bolshevik-controlled territory of the Russian Republic that started on February 18, 1918, as a result of stagnation at the Brest-Litovsk peace talks (see Treaty of Brest-Litovsk).

It was claimed in Soviet times that the decree was written by the chairman of Sovnarkom, Vladimir Lenin, adopted on February 21 and published on February 22, 1918. But modern scholars give authorship of the decree to Leon Trotsky. Trotsky also claimed that it was he who wrote the draft to decree.

== Description ==
In this decree, the author requested "Soviets and revolutionary organizations" to "protect each position to their last drop of blood" and destroy food stocks that could end up in "enemy hands". Railway workers were instructed to divert to the east of the country the rolling stock, during the retreat to destroy the tracks and railway buildings. Also, a mobilization of workers and peasants was declared to dig trenches.

Article 7 of the decree ordered to close "... publications opposing the cause of revolutionary defense and siding with the German bourgeoisie as well as seeking to exploit the invasion of imperialist hordes in order to overthrow the Soviet regime... labor ready editors and staff of these publications are mobilized to dig trenches and other defensive works".

Based on the decree, the Bolsheviks' appointed Commander-in-Chief Nikolai Krylenko signed the order about "revolutionary mobilization" on February 21, 1918.

Richard Pipes in his work "The Bolsheviks in the struggle for power" draws attention to the last bullets of the decree. Article 6 included the mobilization to dig trenches, "under the supervision of the Red Guards", "all labor ready members of the bourgeois class, men and women", in fear of being shot. According to the researcher, "from here derived the practice of forced labor, which has since been applied to millions of citizens of the country."
