= Christ the King Church, Marks =

Coordinates: 51.7031°N 46.7321°E

Christ the King Church
- Церковь Христа Царя
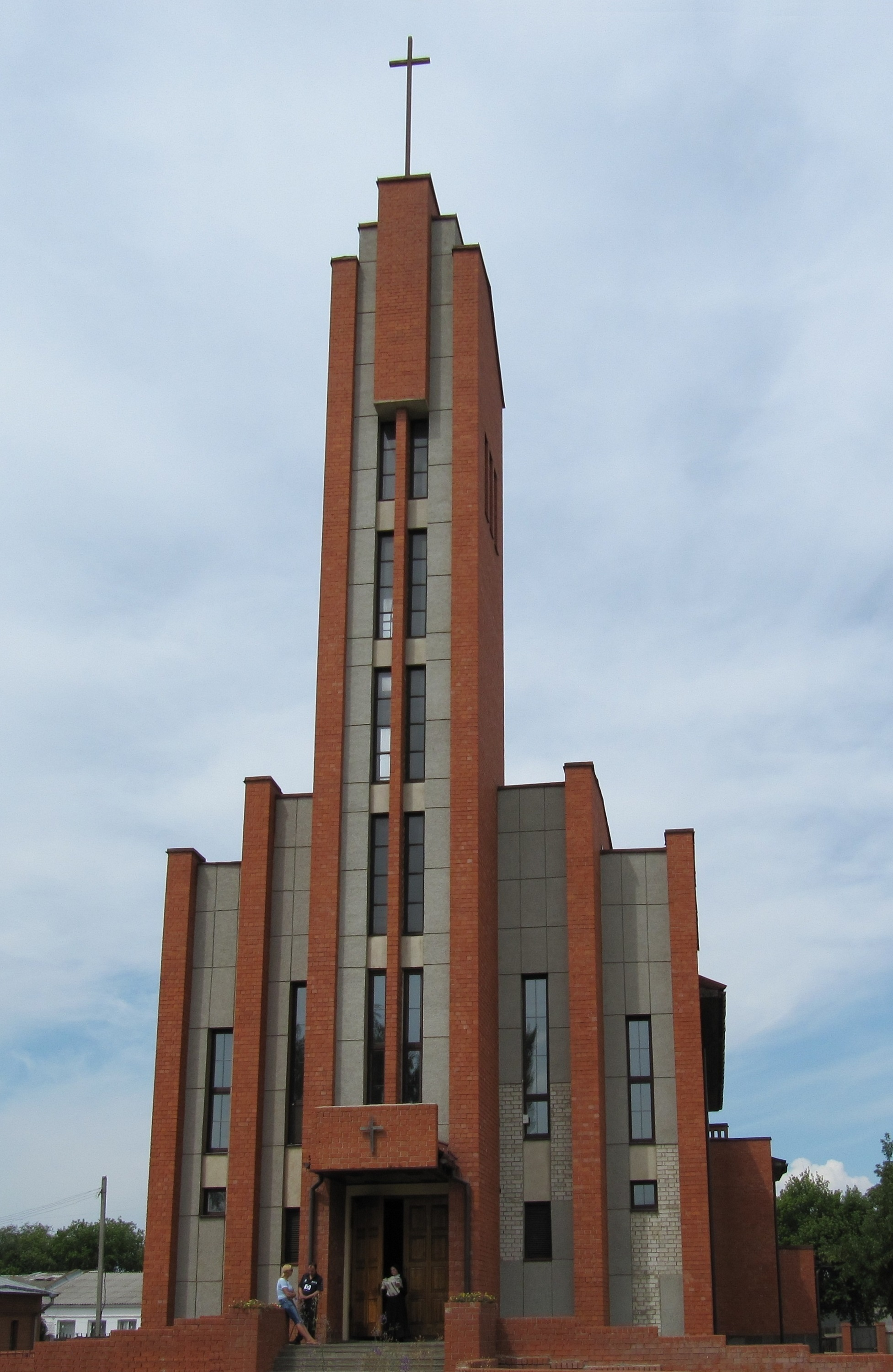
- Christ the King Church
- Location: Marks
- Country: Russia
- Denomination: Roman Catholic Church

The Christ the King Church (Russian: Церковь Христа Царя) It is a Catholic church located in the city of Marks (Saratov) in Russia, home to the descendants of the German Catholics of the Volga.

Christ the King Church is the first Catholic church to be built in Russia after the fall of the USSR, and after the revolution of 1917. Construction began in 1990 and was the church consecrated in 1993.

The Catholic parish was revived and registered in 1983. The community was served by Joseph Werth from 1988 to 1991 and by father Clemens Pickel until 2001.

A community of Catholic nuns is located nearby. They provide, among other services, catechesis.

The parish also serves the small village church of Stepnoïe 46 kilometers southwest.

== See also ==
- Roman Catholicism in Russia
- Christ the King Church
