= Alexander Heckmann =

Soviet–Volga German politician (1908–1994)

- Александр Гекман

Chairman of the Council of People's Commissars of the Volga German ASSR
- In office July 1938 – September 1941
- Supreme Soviet Chairman: Konrad Hoffmann
- Preceded by: Wladimir Dalinger
- Succeeded by: Position abolished

Personal details
- Born: August 17, 1908 Goly Karamysh (Balzer), Saratov Governorate, Russian Empire
- Died: 1994 (aged 85–86) Batumi, Autonomous Republic of Adjara, Georgia
- Citizenship: Soviet
- Party: Communist Party of the Soviet Union

Alexander Ivanovich Heckmann (Russian: Александр Иванович Гекман, romanized: Aleksandr Ivanovich Gekman; 17 August 1908 – 1994) was a Soviet–Volga German politician. From 1938 to 1941, he served as the last head of government of the Volga German ASSR.

== Biography ==
Heckmann was born in the Saratov Governorate of the Russian Empire, into the family of a bricklayer in the village of Goly Karamysh (German name Balzer; today part of the city of Krasnoarmeysk). From the age of ten he worked as a spool craftsman and poster. In 1922 he joined the Komsomol and took an active part in building a pioneer organization in Balzer. In 1926 he entered the workers' faculty of Saratov. In 1930 he joined the CPSU. In 1934 he graduated from the Saratov Institute of Agricultural Mechanization. As a student, he actively participated in the collectivization and dekulakization in the area. From 1935 he worked as an electrical engineer in companies of the People's Commissariats for Light Industry and Agriculture. In September 1937 he was appointed People's Commissar for Light Industry of the Volga German ASSR.

In February 1938 he was elected 2nd Secretary of the Regional Committee of the Communist Party of the ASSR. On 20 June 1938, the Presidium of the Central Executive Committee of the ASSR appointed him Chairman of the Council of People's Commissars of the ASSR. At the 1st meeting of the Supreme Soviet of the ASSR, held on 25–27 July 1938, his candidacy was approved. He was Chairman of the Council of People's Commissars of the ASSR from July 1938 to September 1941.

On 12 December 1937, he was elected a deputy of the Supreme Soviet of the USSR (in the Soviet of Nationalities) from the Krasnoarmeysk constituency of the ASSR. On 26 June 1938, he was elected deputy of the Supreme Soviet of the RSFSR for the 1st electoral term from the Balzer constituency of the Volga German ASSR. He took the post of deputy chairman of the Presidium of the Supreme Soviet. He was recalled on 27 March 1944; officially because he had "lost touch with his voters".

On 22 June 1941, the German attack on the Soviet Union commenced. On July 13th and 14th, 1941, together with Konrad Hoffmann, the last head of state (chairman of the Presidium of the Supreme Soviet) of the Volga German ASSR, he appealed to the German people not to shed the blood of the Soviet people and to take up arms against Adolf Hitler and to judge the "fascist cannibals".

On 1 September 1941, in accordance with the decree of 28 August "On Resettlement of Germans living in the Volga Region", he and his family were deported to Minusinsk in the Krasnoyarsk Krai. On 5 September 1941 he was removed from office in absentia. In Minusinsk he worked as an electrical engineer at the municipal power plant for a few months. From January 1942 he was in the NKVD labor columns in Vyatlag in Kirov Oblast. Here he became secretary of the party organization of the mobilized 12th Lumberjack Brigade. He was removed from this post after his expulsion from the CPSU. He was transferred to Bazstroi in the Sverdlovsk region of the Ukrainian SSR, where he was the senior dispatcher of the construction department of the NKVD Bogoslovsk Aluminum Plant until May 1944.

On 22 May 1944 he was arrested in the case of "Leadership of the former ASSR of the Germans of the Volga region". On 9 August 1946, he was charged with "anti-Soviet propaganda" with a nationalist background and sentenced to 4 years in prison. After his release from prison in 1948, he worked as a power engineer in the match factory in Biysk. From 1957 he worked at the Design Institute in Batumi. He was rehabilitated by the decision of the Presidium of the Sverdlovsk District Court of 12 March 1959.

Political offices
Preceded by Wladimir Dalinger	Chairman of the Council of People's Commissars of the Volga German ASSR; July 1938 – September 1941	Republic extinguished
