= Die Wacht =

Die Wacht ('The Guard') was a Volga German communist newspaper, which appeared around 1918 as a sister publication of Nachrichten. Die Wacht ceased publication in June 1919.
