= Konrad Hoffmann =

Soviet–Volga German politician (1894–1977)

- Конрад Гофман
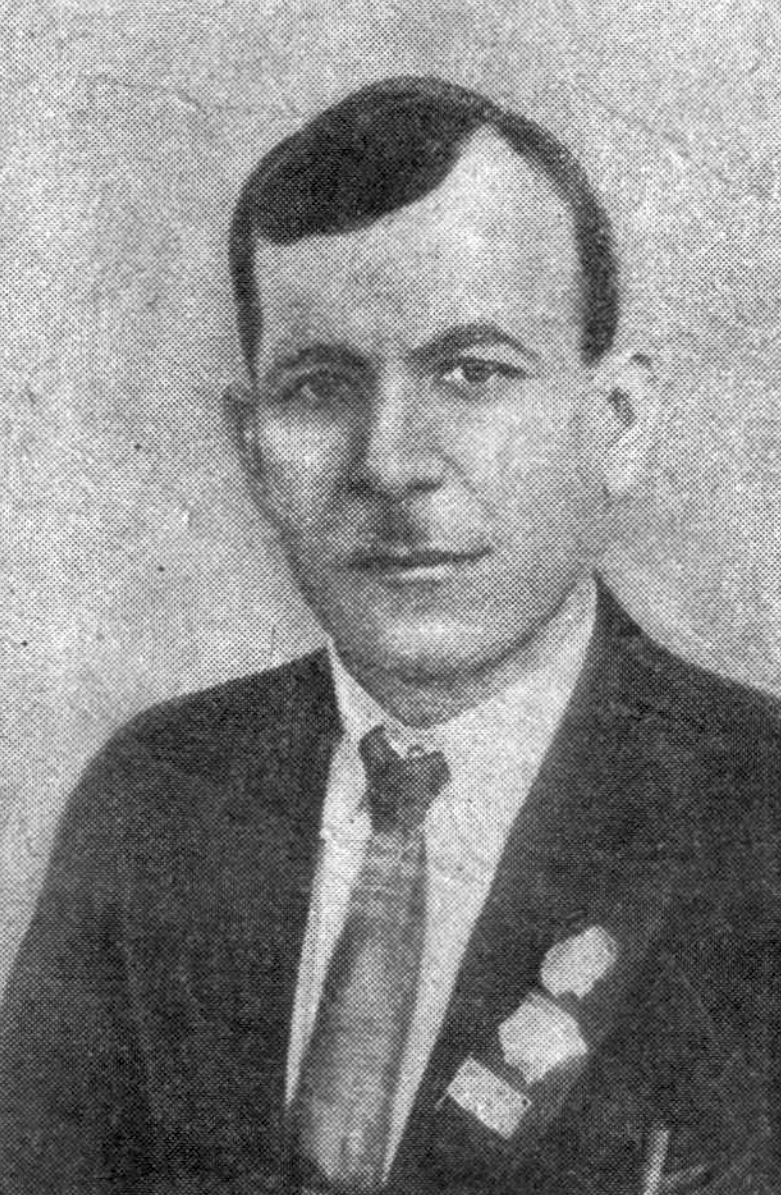
- A 1938 drawing of Hoffmann

Chairman of the Presidium of the Supreme Soviet of the Volga German ASSR
- In office July 1938 – September 1941
- CPC Chairman: Alexander Heckmann
- Preceded by: David Rosenberger (Chairman of the Central Executive Committee of the Volga German ASSR)
- Succeeded by: Position abolished

Personal details
- Born: 1894 Pokrovskaya sloboda, Samara Governorate, Russian Empire
- Died: 1977 (aged 82–83) Andijan, Uzbek SSR, Soviet Union
- Citizenship: Soviet
- Party: Communist Party of the Soviet Union
- Spouse: Antonina Ilyinichna

Military service
- Allegiance: Russian Empire
- Branch/service: Imperial Russian Army
- Rank: Private
- Battles/wars: World War I; Caucasus campaign

Konrad Heinrichovich Hoffmann (Russian: Конрад Генрихович Гофман, romanized: Konrad Genrikhovich Gofman; 1894 – 1977) was a Soviet–Volga German politician. From 1938 to 1941, he served as the last head of state of the Volga German ASSR.

== Biography ==
Hoffmann was born in the Samara Governorate of the Russian Empire; he came from a working-class family. During World War I, he served in the Imperial Russian Army and fought in the Caucasus campaign. From 1918 to 1936 he worked as an assistant driver, then as a locomotive driver in the town of Engels. In 1924 the Volga German ASSR was founded, as an Autonomous Soviet Socialist Republic within the Russian SFSR of the USSR. In the same year, Hoffmann became a member of the CPSU. In the years 1936 to 1937 he was master and manager of a locomotive depot.

From July 1938 Hoffmann was chairman of the Presidium of the Supreme Soviet of the Volga German ASSR – i.e. the head of state. Also since 1938 he was a deputy in the Supreme Soviet of the USSR.

With the German attack on the Soviet Union on 22 June 1941, the situation changed dramatically for Hoffmann. On July 13 and 14, 1941, together with Alexander Heckmann, the last head of government (chairman of the Council of People's Commissars) of the Volga German ASSR, he appealed to the German people not to shed the blood of the Soviet people and to take up arms against Adolf Hitler and to judge the "fascist cannibals". Although he had spoken out clearly against the Third Reich and fascism, he was removed from all political offices in September 1941. The Volga German ASSR was dissolved and its ethnic German population was deported to Central Asia and Siberia. Hoffmann was accused of sabotage, arrested by the NKVD and had to do forced labor in the Gulag "correctional labour camps". After the end of World War II, he was released again and was able to settle with his family in Andijan, in the Uzbek SSR. There he worked for a railway company and died in 1977 at the age of 82. In 1996 he was officially posthumously rehabilitated.

Political offices
Preceded by David Rosenberger as Chairman of the Central Executive Committee of the Volga German ASSR	Chairman of the Presidium of the Supreme Soviet of the Volga German ASSR; July 1938 – September 1941	Republic extinguished
