= Labour Commune of Volga Germans =

Autonomous Region within the RSFSR (1918–1923)

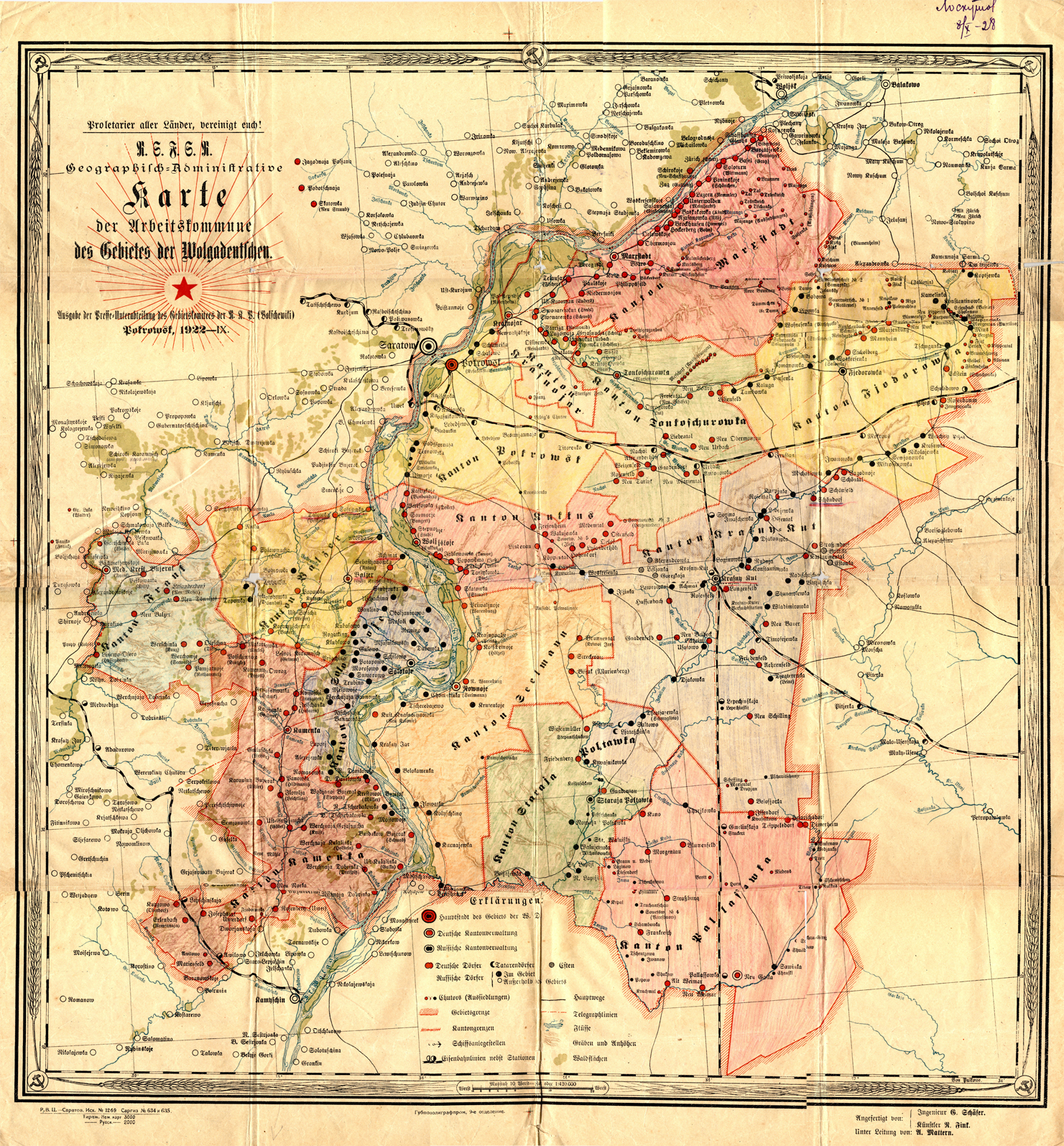
Labour Commune of Volga Germans in 1922

The Labour Commune of Volga Germans (German: Arbeitskommune der Wolgadeutschen; Russian: Трудовая коммуна немцев Поволжья, romanized: Trudovaya kommuna nemtsev Povolzh'ya) was a polity established in Russia following the Bolshevik seizure of power in October 1917. The Council of People's Commissars of the Russian Soviet Federative Socialist Republic passed a decree which established this.

The administrative centre was originally located in the city of Saratov, but was relocated to Yekaterinenstadt, which was renamed Marxstadt a few weeks later in June 1919.

The polity consisted of three districts (Uyezds):

- Goly Karamysh District centred on Goly Karamysh
- Yekaterinenstadt District centred on Yekaterinenstadt (Marxstadt)
- Rovnoye District centred on Rovnoye

It was restructured as the Volga German Autonomous Soviet Socialist Republic on February 20, 1924 (claims of December 19, 1923), by the Declaration of the All-Russian Central Executive Committee and the Council of People's Commissars of the Russian SFSR.
