= Rote Jugend =

- Rote Jugend, October 26, 1936 issue
- Type: Twice-monthly (1924-1927), Weekly (1927-)
- Publisher: Volga German ASSR regional committee, Komsomol
- Editor: A. Loos
- Founded: June 18, 1924
- Political alignment: Communist
- Language: German language
- Headquarters: Engels

Rote Jugend ('Red Youth') was a Volga German communist newspaper. It was the organ of the regional committee of the All-Union Leninist Communist Youth League in the Volga German Autonomous Soviet Socialist Republic. The newspaper was founded in 1919.

Rote Jugend was published from Engels. It began publishing twice monthly from June 18, 1924 onwards. In January 1927 it was converted into a weekly newspaper. It was printed at the State Publishers of the People's Commissariat. A. Loos served as the editor of Rote Jugend.
