= Vyatlag =

GULAG camp К-231 in Kirov Oblast

Vyatlag, Vyatsky ITL or Vyatka ITL (Вятский ИТЛ, Vyatka correctional labor camp) was one of the largest Gulag forced labor camps. It was named after Vyatka Land, being located in Kirov Oblast, centered in Kirov, formerly known as Vyatka. It was established on February 5, 1938, and existed well after the dismantling of Gulag. Its main operations were logging and wood processing, including the construction of the related plants and rail and automobile roads, as well as other odd production. It is peak it housed over 28,000 inmates in 1942.

A fundamental, over 450 pages, work on the history of Vyatlag was published by Viktor Berdinskikh.

== Notable inmates ==
- Alexander Heckmann, served in NKVD labor columns
- Artūrs Kēlers
- Fricis Virsaitis ( November 14, 1882 – May 24, 1943 ), Latvian general, died in Vyatlag
- Heinrich Paal, best known as an Esnotian Olympic footballer. Being a member of the Estonian Defence League, he was arrested by NKVD after the Soviet annexation of Estonia and died in Vyatlag.
- Jaan Zimmermann
- Juhan Tõrvand
- Kaarel Eenpalu
- Natalya Semper
- Oskar Suursööt
- Yuri Davydov

See "Vyatlag inmates" category in Russian Wikipedia for more.
