= Emblem of the Volga German Autonomous Soviet Socialist Republic =

- Armiger: Volga German Autonomous Soviet Socialist Republic
- Adopted: 29 April 1937
- Crest: Red star
- Supporters: Wheat and Cotton
- Motto: Proletarier aller Länder, vereinigt euch! (German) Пролетарии всех стран, соединяйтесь! (Russian) "Workers of the world, unite!"

The national emblem of the Volga German Autonomous Soviet Socialist Republic was adopted in 1937 by the government of the Volga German Autonomous Soviet Socialist Republic. The emblem is similar to the emblem of the Russian Soviet Federative Socialist Republic.

== History ==
=== Second version ===
On April 29, 1937, the second stage of the Extraordinary 10th Congress of Soviets of the Volga German ASSR adopted the Constitution of the Volga German Autonomous Soviet Socialist Republic. The Constitution was approved by the Law of the Russian SFSR on June 2, 1940. Article 110 of the constitution described the emblem of the Volga German ASSR :

The State Emblem of the Volga German Autonomous Soviet Socialist Republic is the state emblem of the RSFSR, which consists of an image of a gold sickle and a hammer, placed crosswise, with handles down, on a red background in the sun and framed with ears of" RSFSR " "Proletarians of all countries, unite!" In Russian and German, with the addition of "Volga German ASSR" in Russian and German under the inscription "RSFSR" with smaller letters.

— Constitution of the Volga German Autonomous Soviet Socialist Republic (1937), Article 110

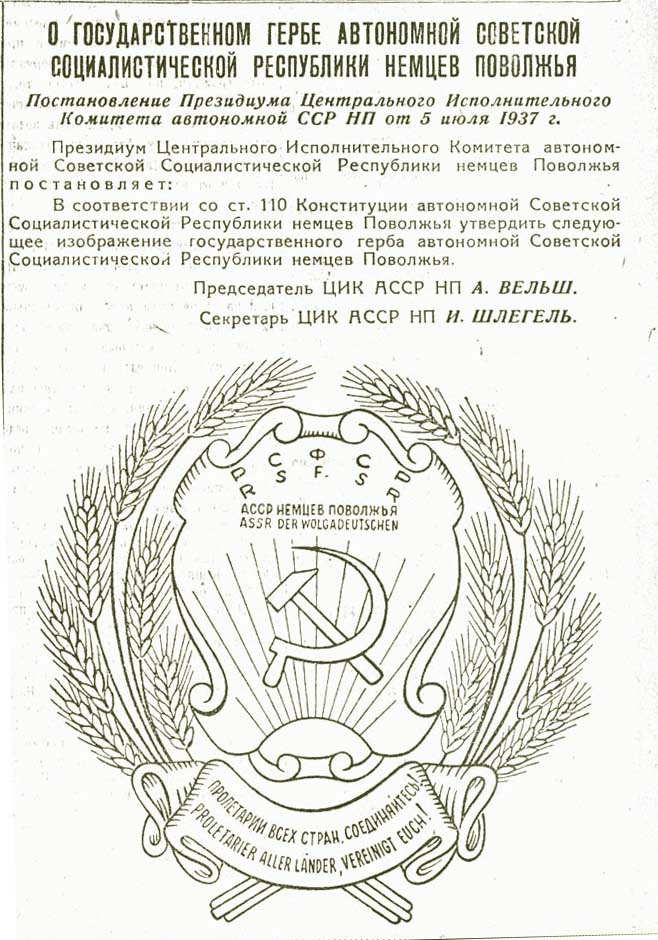
The decree on the emblem of the Volga German ASSR.

On 7 May 1937, the Presidium of the Central Executive Committee of the Volga German ASSR adopted a decree "On the State Emblem of the Volga German Autonomous Soviet Socialist Republic":

In accordance with Article 110 of the Constitution of the Volga German Autonomous Soviet Socialist Republic, the following image of the state emblem of the Volga German Autonomous Soviet Socialist Republic.

— On the State Emblem of the Volga German Autonomous Soviet Socialist Republic (1937)

The decree which depicted the emblem of the Volga German Autonomous Soviet Socialist Republic was published on July 10, 1937, on the front page of the newspaper Bolshevik.

The emblem was relinquished after the liquidation of the Volga German ASSR by the Decree of the Presidium of the Supreme Soviet of the USSR of August 28, 1941 "On the resettlement of Germans living in the Volga region".

== Gallery ==
1937–1941
