= Wilhelm Adolfovich Kurz =

Austrian-Soviet Politician

Wilhelm Adolfovich Kurz (1892 – 10 May 1938) was an Austrian-born politician in the Soviet Union. He was a prominent member of the Volga German community and served as the head of government of the Volga German Autonomous Soviet Socialist Republic from 1922 to 1924.

== Biography ==
Wilhelm Adolfovich Kurz was born in 1892 in Vienna. His father emigrated to Russia with his family when Wilhelm was a child.

After the outbreak of World War I, he was exiled to Kazan. Following the February Revolution, he was released from exile and began organizing for the Communist Party among the German-speaking residents of Kazan. He later moved to Moscow and led the Austrian-Hungarian Council for Workers’ and Soldiers’ Deputies. In 1920, the Central Committee of the Communist Party sent him to the Volga German Autonomous Soviet Socialist Republic to participate in the region's Congress of Soviets. He became the chairman of the economic committee for the Republicans in 1921. In 1922, he was tapped to become the Chairman of the Councils of People's Commissars, which was the Prime Minister of the Republic.

In 1931, Kurz was appointed as the head of Intourist, which organized tourism for foreign visitors. In 1933, he became the first Soviet official to visit the United States after its recognition of the Soviet Union.

In 1937, Kurz, along with other leaders of the Volga German ASSR were arrested and charged with membership in a counterrevolutionary nationalist organization. He was tried and sentenced to death by the Politburo on 27 April 1938. He was executed on 10 May 1938 in Kommunarka.

He was rehabilitated in 1957.
