= Early Soviet Decrees =

Soviet legislation in 1917–24, before the Soviet Union

Decrees (Russian: декреты) were legislative acts of the highest Soviet institutions, primarily of the Council of People's Commissars (the highest executive body) and of VTsIK (the highest legislative body between sessions of the Congress of Soviets), issued between 1917 and 1924. Such acts issued after 1924 are referred to as Decisions (Russian: постановление) or Ukases in Soviet sources.

These decrees under Lenin's first government laid the basis for socially progressive policies in the Soviet Union such as universal education, universal healthcare, participatory democracy, the extension of legal rights for women and ethnic minorities.

== Bolshevik Initial Decrees ==
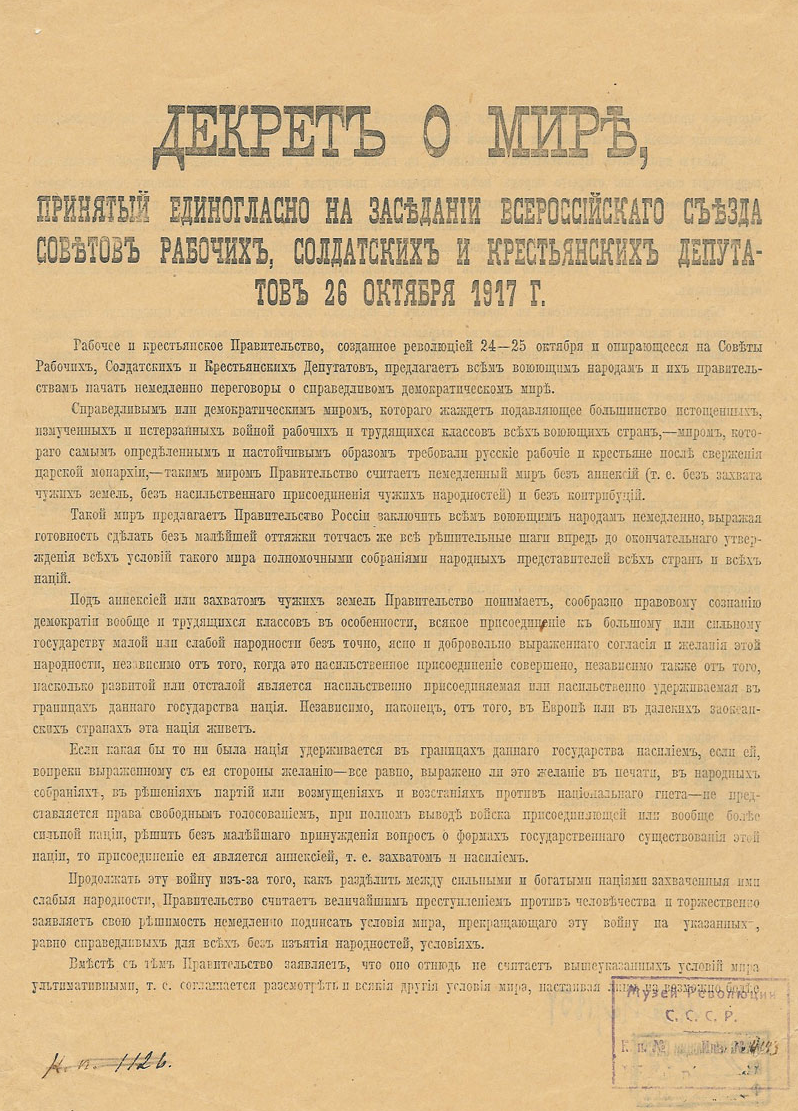
Decree on Peace title page

The Bolshevik Initial Decrees (the 'Decrees') were announced as soon as the Bolsheviks declared their success in the October Revolution (October 26, 1917). The Decrees seemed to conform to the popular Bolshevik slogan "Peace, Land and Bread", taken up by the masses during the July Days (July 1917), an uprising of workers and military forces. The slogan succinctly articulated the grievances of the Russian peasantry, armed forces and proletariat (the working-class sections of Russian society). As revisionist historian Christopher Read suggests, "The Bolsheviks were successful in uniting the diverse revolutionary movements and directing them towards one goal", namely the establishment of state-socialism. At the same time, the Bolsheviks were not "re-inventing the wheel." Legal reforms along similar lines to the Decrees had been discussed in the State Duma but were not implemented due to internal disagreements.

The Decree on Peace outlined measures for Russia's withdrawal from the First World War without "payment of indemnities or annexations". This decree aimed to secure the support of many soldiers on the disintegrating Russian front. The sincerity of this Bolshevik assurance came under scrutiny when V.I. Lenin endorsed the Treaty of Brest-Litovsk which divested Russia of its Baltic territory.

The Decree on Land outlined measures by which the peasants were to divide up rural land among themselves. It advocated the forceful dissolution of many wealthy estates by peasant forces. Such measures no doubt contributed to an increase in Bolshevik support amongst the peasantry, but were counterproductive in that the Russian war front disintegrated as soldiers (who were formerly peasants) returned to secure land for themselves.

The Workers' Decrees outlined measures for minimum wage, limitations on workers' hours, and the running of factories by elected workers' committees. This consolidated Bolshevik support amongst the working classes in the cities, where they had taken power.

The Bolsheviks also declared approximately 100 other decrees outlining the formal setup of Bolshevik government through the medium of the soviet institutions. Nevertheless, Soviet political sovereignty was to be further challenged by the fact that the Social Revolutionary Party attained over 50% of the votes in a democratically elected Russian Constituent Assembly in January 1918. The Assembly was promptly shut down by the Bolsheviks on the grounds that the Soviets (workers' councils) were a more advanced democratic representation of the Russian people.

The significance of the Decrees has been the subject of historical debate. There is consensus that the Bolsheviks wanted to secure popular support through them. However, historians question the Bolsheviks' motives in pursuing this populist agenda. Liberal historians are sceptical and see the Decrees as opportunistic. For instance, Edward Acton believes that the Bolsheviks realised that the mass of ordinary people did not share their objectives. Furthermore, those ordinary people had no idea that their interests were not tied to the Bolsheviks. The reality was that "the cleavage of the goals of the masses and that of the Bolsheviks was fundamental." Richard Pipes takes this analysis further and contends that key Bolsheviks intentionally proposed the Decrees to gain the legitimacy they would need to bring about a totalitarian state. Revisionist historians take a different view. According to them, the advent of a totalitarian state was circumstantial. The Bolsheviks were not opportunists but benevolent idealists; the point of the Decrees was to bring about a better quality of life for the Russian people. Regardless of which view is the more accurate account, it is clear from these opposing perspectives that the history of the Initial Decrees is a politically charged issue. This is perhaps because historians use the Decrees to try to discern whether the implementation of Marxist thought has totalitarian tendencies.

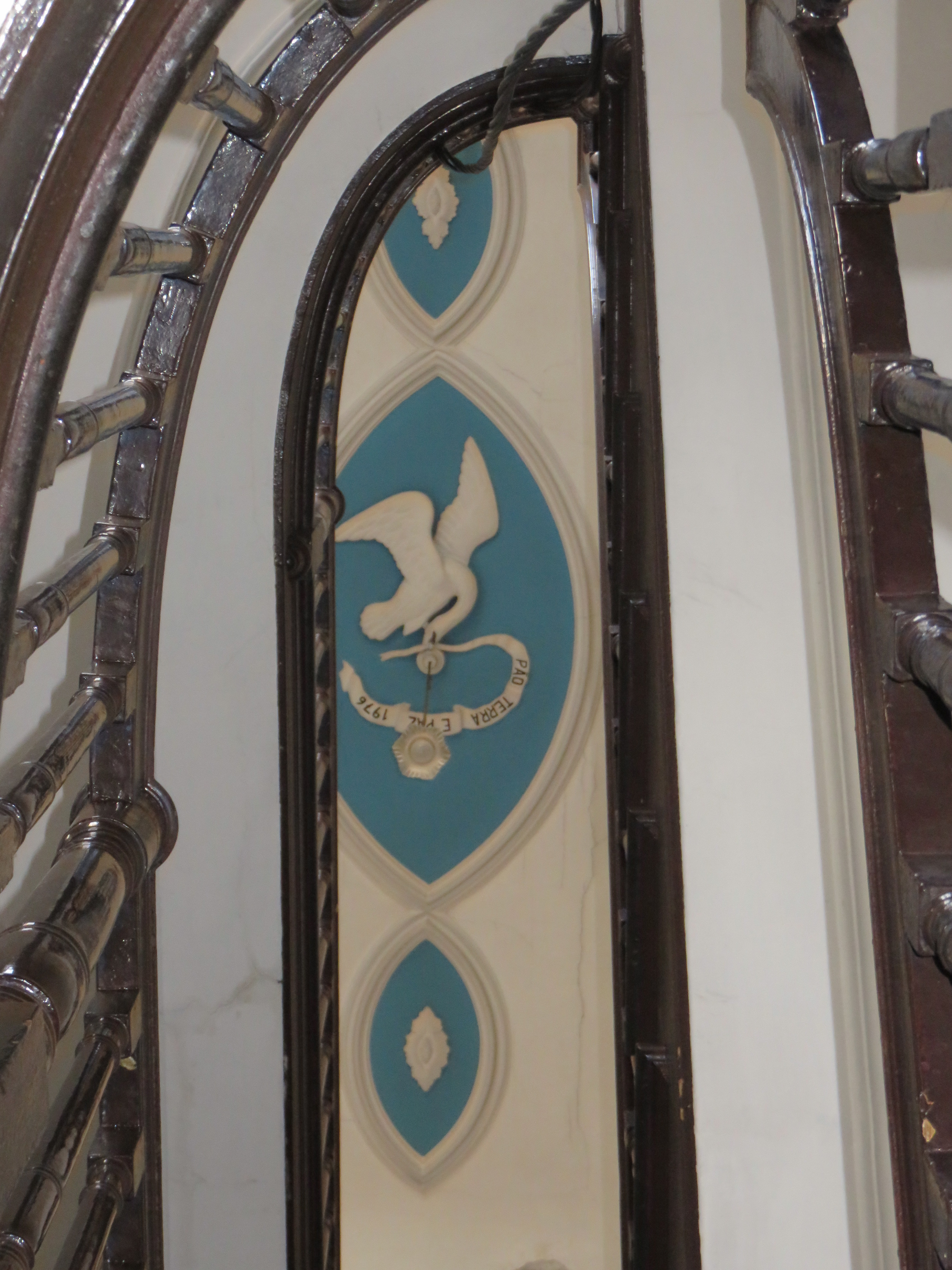
"Pão, Terra e Paz" (Bread, Land and Peace) Bolshevik motto painted in plaster in a ceiling of a Funchal building previously housing the paramilitary organization Legião Portuguesa, in 1976, after the Carnation Revolution

== List of Soviet Decrees ==
=== 1917 ===
Date (New Style)	Decree name	Issued by	E-text
November 8	Decree on Peace	2nd Congress of Soviets of Workers', Soldiers', and Peasants' Deputies	
November 8	Decree on Land	2nd Congress of Soviets of Workers', Soldiers', and Peasants' Deputies	
November 8	Decree on Establishment of the Workers' and Peasants' Government	2nd Congress of Soviets of Workers', Soldiers', and Peasants' Deputies	
November 9	Decree on Press	Sovnarkom	
November 11	Decree on an Eight-Hour Working Day	Sovnarkom	
November 12	Decree on the Right to Issue Laws	Sovnarkom	
November 13	Decree on Social Insurance	Sovnarkom	
November 18	Decree on Transfer of Power and the Means of Production to the Toilers	Sovnarkom	
November 22	Decree on Establishment of the State Commission on Enlightenment	Sovnarkom	
November 24	Decree on the Abolition of Estates and Civil Ranks	VTsIK	
November 27	Decree on Workers' Control	Sovnarkom	
December 5	Decree on Courts	VTsIK	
December 15	Decree on the Formation of the Supreme Economic Council of National Economy	VTsIK, Sovnarkom	
December 27	Decree on the Nationalization of the Banks	VTsIK	
December 29	Decree on the Election of Officers and on the Organization of Authority in the Army	VTsIK, Sovnarkom	
December 29	Decree on the Equalization of Rights of All Serving in the Army	VTsIK, Sovnarkom	
December 31	Decree on the State Independence of Finland	Sovnarkom	
December 31	Decree on Civil Marriage, Children and civil registry bookkeeping	VTsIK, Sovnarkom	

=== 1918 ===
Date (New Style)	Decree name	Issued by	E-text
January 4	Decree on the Clock Change	Sovnarkom	
January 7	Decree on the Rights and Duties of Soviets	Sovnarkom	
January 19	Decree on the Dissolution of the Constituent Assembly	VTsIK	
January 28	Decree on Establishment of the Workers' and Peasants' Red Army	Sovnarkom	
February 2	Decree on Separation of Church and State	Sovnarkom	
February 3	Decree on the Annullation of State Debts	VTsIK	
February 8	Decree on Introduction of the Western European Calendar	Sovnarkom	
February 11	Decree on Establishment of the Workers' and Peasants' Red Fleet	Sovnarkom	
February 15	Decree on Courts N2	VTsIK	
February 21	Decree "Socialist Homeland is in Danger!"	Sovnarkom	
March 26	Decree on the End of Workers' Control over the Railroads	Sovnarkom	
April 10	Decree on Consumers' Co-Operatives	Sovnarkom	
April 12	Decree on the Dismantling of Monuments Erected in Honor of the Tsars and Their Servants and on the Formulation of Projects of Monuments to the Russian Socialist Revolution	Sovnarkom	
April 14	Decree on the Flag of the Russian Republic	VTsIK	
April 22	Decree on the Nationalization of External Trade	Sovnarkom	
April 22	Decree on Establishing Compulsory Military Training for Workers and Peasants of Age 18 to 40	VTsIK	
May 2	Decree on the Nationalization of the Sugar Industry	Sovnarkom	
May 13	Decree Giving the Food Commissariat Extraordinary Powers to Combat Village Bourgeoisie Who Were Concealing and Speculating on Grain Reserves	VTsIK, Sovnarkom	
May 13	Decree on Forests	Sovnarkom	
May 29	Decree on the Compulsory Recruitment into the Workers' and Peasants' Red Army	VTsIK	
June 11	Decree on the Organisation of the Village Poor and Supply to Them of Grain, Prime Necessities and Agricultural Implements	VTsIK	
June 28	Decree on the Nationalization of Large-Scale Industry and Railway Transportation Enterprises	Sovnarkom	
August 9	Decree on the Uprooting of the Anti-Semitic Movement	Sovnarkom	
September 4	Decree on the Nationalization of Private Railroads	Sovnarkom	
September 5	Decree on Red Terror	Sovnarkom	
September 14	Decree on the Introduction of the International Decimal Metric System	Sovnarkom	
October 5	Decree on Registration and Protection of Monuments of Culture and Ancient Art, Owned by Private Persons, Societies and Institutions	Sovnarkom	
October 19	Decree on the Establishment of the Labour Commune of Volga Germans	Sovnarkom	
October 31	Decree on the Social Security of Working People	Sovnarkom	

=== 1919 ===
Date (New Style)	Decree name	Issued by	E-text
January 4	Decree on Release from Military Service Due to Religious Beliefs	Sovnarkom	
January 11	Decree on Surplus Appropriation System	Sovnarkom	
February 8	Decree on the Introduction of Time Measurement According to International Time Zone System	Sovnarkom	
April 22	Decree on the Order of Preservation and Annihilation of Archive Acts	Sovnarkom	
July 29	Decree on Abolishing Private Property Rights on Archives of Russian Writers, Composers, Painters and Scientists, Preserved in Libraries and Museums	Sovnarkom	
December 26	Decree on Eradication of Illiteracy among the Population of the Russian SFSR	Sovnarkom	

=== 1920 ===
Date (New Style)	Decree name	Issued by	E-text
January 29	Decree on the Universal Labour Conscription	Sovnarkom	
June 8	Decree on Labour Rewarding with Premiums	Sovnarkom	
June 17	Decree on General Wage Regulations	Sovnarkom	

=== 1921 ===
Date (New Style)	Decree name	Issued by	E-text
March 21	Decree on the Replacement of Surplus Appropriation System by the Food Tax	VTsIK	
March 28	Decree on the Free Exchange, Purchase and Selling of Agricultural Goods in Guberniyas that Ended Surplus Appropriation System	Sovnarkom	
April 7	Decree on Consumers' Cooperation	Sovnarkom	
July 7	Decree on Producers' Cooperation	VTsIK, Sovnarkom	

=== 1922 ===
Date (New Style)	Decree name	Issued by	E-text
March 17	Decree on the Universal Food Tax for Agricultural Goods	VTsIK, Sovnarkom	
November 15	Decree on the Unification of the Russian SFSR with the Far Eastern Republic	VTsIK	
December 19	Decree on Giving Exit Visas and Passports for Going Abroad	Sovnarkom	

=== 1924 ===
Date (New Style)	Decree name	Issued by	E-text
December 19	Decree on Transforming Labour Commune of Volga Germans into ASSR	VTsIK	
