= Christ the King Church, Jog Falls =

Christ the King Church
- Christ the King Church, Jog Falls
- Location within Karnataka
- 14°13′44″N 74°48′43″E
- Location: Jog Falls, Shimoga district
- Country: India
- Denomination: Roman Catholic
- Website: www.shimogadiocese.org

History
- Status: Parish church
- Dedication: Christ the King

Architecture
- Functional status: Active

Administration
- Province: Bangalore
- Diocese: Shimoga
- Parish: Jog Falls

Clergy
- Archbishop: Peter Machado
- Bishop: Francis Serrao

Christ the King Church, Jog Falls was established in 1959. It is located in Jog Falls, Sagara, Shimoga District, Karnataka state, India.
