= Cantons of the Soviet Union =

Administrative units of the Soviet Union

Cantons were administrative units in several autonomous republics and regions of Russian Soviet Federative Socialist Republic, and then the Soviet Union, in 1919–1941. Cantons existed in Bashkir ASSR (1919–1930), Dagestan ASSR (1928–1929), Kirghiz ASSR (1926–1930), Tatar ASSR (1920–1930), Mari AO (1921–1932) and the Volga German ASSR (1922–1941).
