= Fölkersam =

Fölkersam or Fölkersahm (Russian: Фёлькерзам) is the name of an aristocratic Baltic German family and may refer to:

- Adrian von Fölkersam (1914–1945), German Waffen-SS officer
- Dmitry von Fölkersam (1846–1905), Admiral in the Imperial Russian Navy
