= Marks, Russia =

Town in Saratov Oblast, Russia

Marks Маркс
- Town
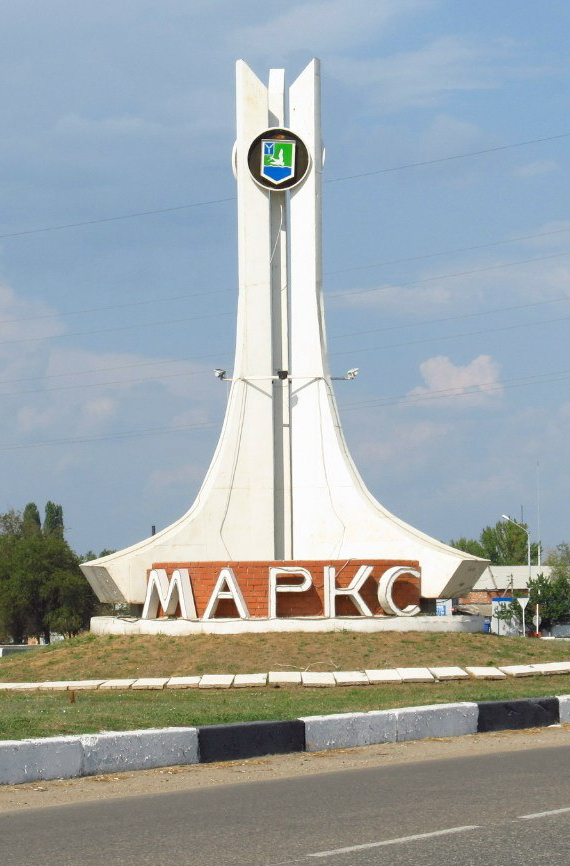
- A stele at the entrance to Marks

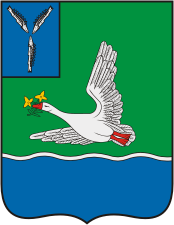
- Coat of arms
- Interactive map of Marks
- Location of Marks Marks (Saratov Oblast)
- Coordinates: 51°43′N 46°45′E
- Country: Russia
- Federal subject: Saratov Oblast
- Founded: 1767
- Town status since: 1918
- Elevation: 20 m (66 ft)

Population (2010 Census)
  - Total: 31,531
  - Estimate (2021): 28,749 (−8.8%)

Administrative status
  - Subordinated to: Marks Town Under Oblast Jurisdiction
  - Capital of: Marksovsky District, Marks Town Under Oblast Jurisdiction

Municipal status
  - Municipal district: Marksovsky Municipal District
  - Urban settlement: Marks Urban Settlement
  - Capital of: Marksovsky Municipal District, Marks Urban Settlement
- Time zone: UTC+4 (MSK+1)
- Postal codes: 413090, 413092, 413093
- Dialing code: +7 84567
- OKTMO ID: 63626101001

Marks (Russian: Маркс), also spelled Marx, named after Karl Marx, is a town in Saratov Oblast, Russia, located 60 kilometers (37 mi) northeast of Saratov, the administrative center of the oblast. Population: 31,531 (2010 census); 32,849 (2002 census); 31,908 (1989 Soviet census).

It was previously known as Baronsk, Katharinenstadt (until 1920), Marxstadt (until 1941).

== History ==
It was founded in 1767 as a Volga German community called Baronsk (Баронск), named so because the Dutchman Ferdinand Baron Caneau de Beauregard, who was a baron, founded the city. It was soon renamed Katharinenstadt (Екатериненштадт; Yekaterinenshtadt, Jekaterinenstadt; 1915 - 1920 Yekaterinograd), after Catherine the Great. In 1918, it was granted town status and was the location for the administration of the Labour Commune of Volga Germans. It was renamed Marxstadt in 1919 (Марксштадт; Marksshtadt), after Karl Marx. In 1941, during the resettlement of Germans, the town was given its present name.

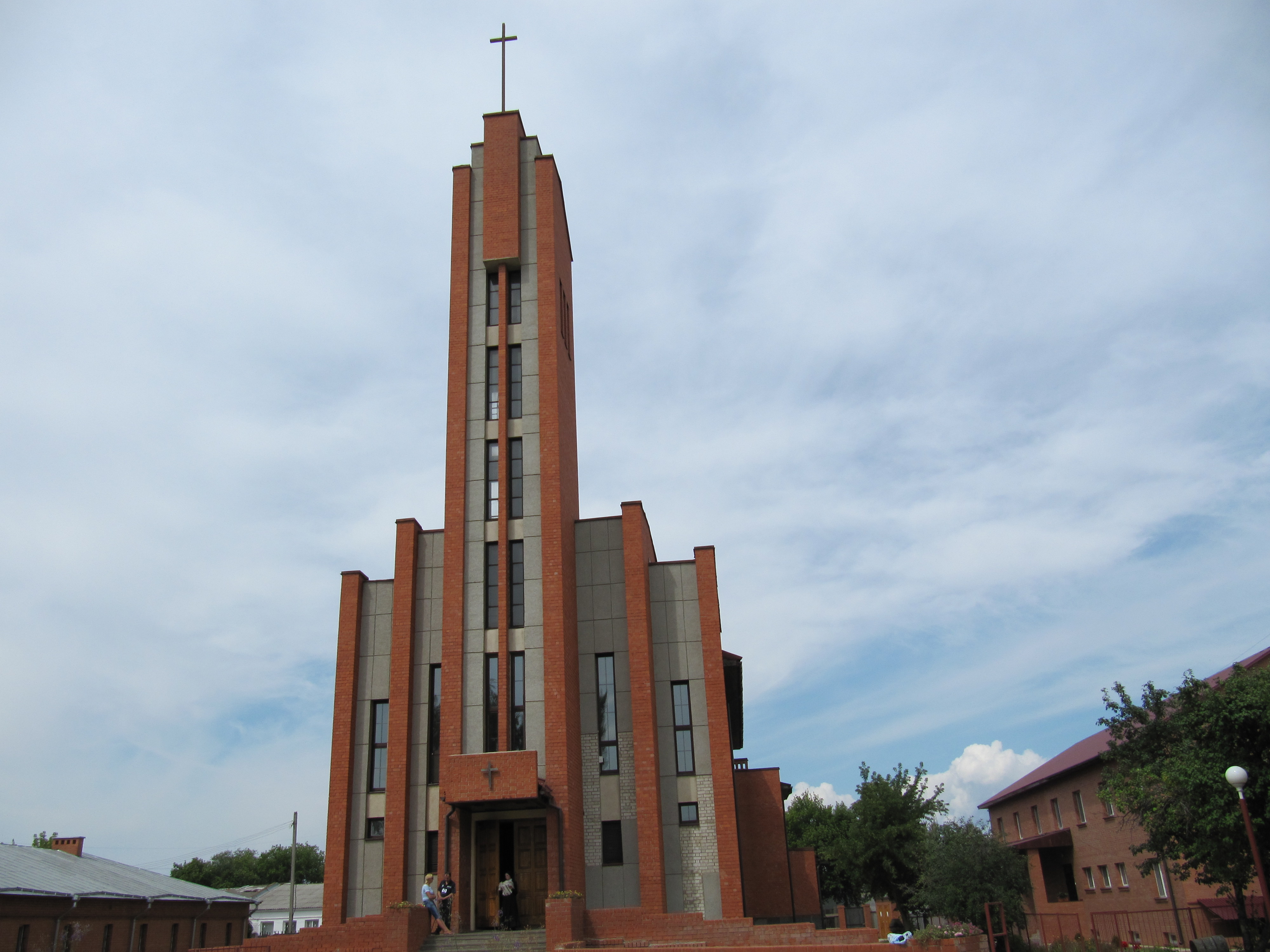
Christ the King Catholic church

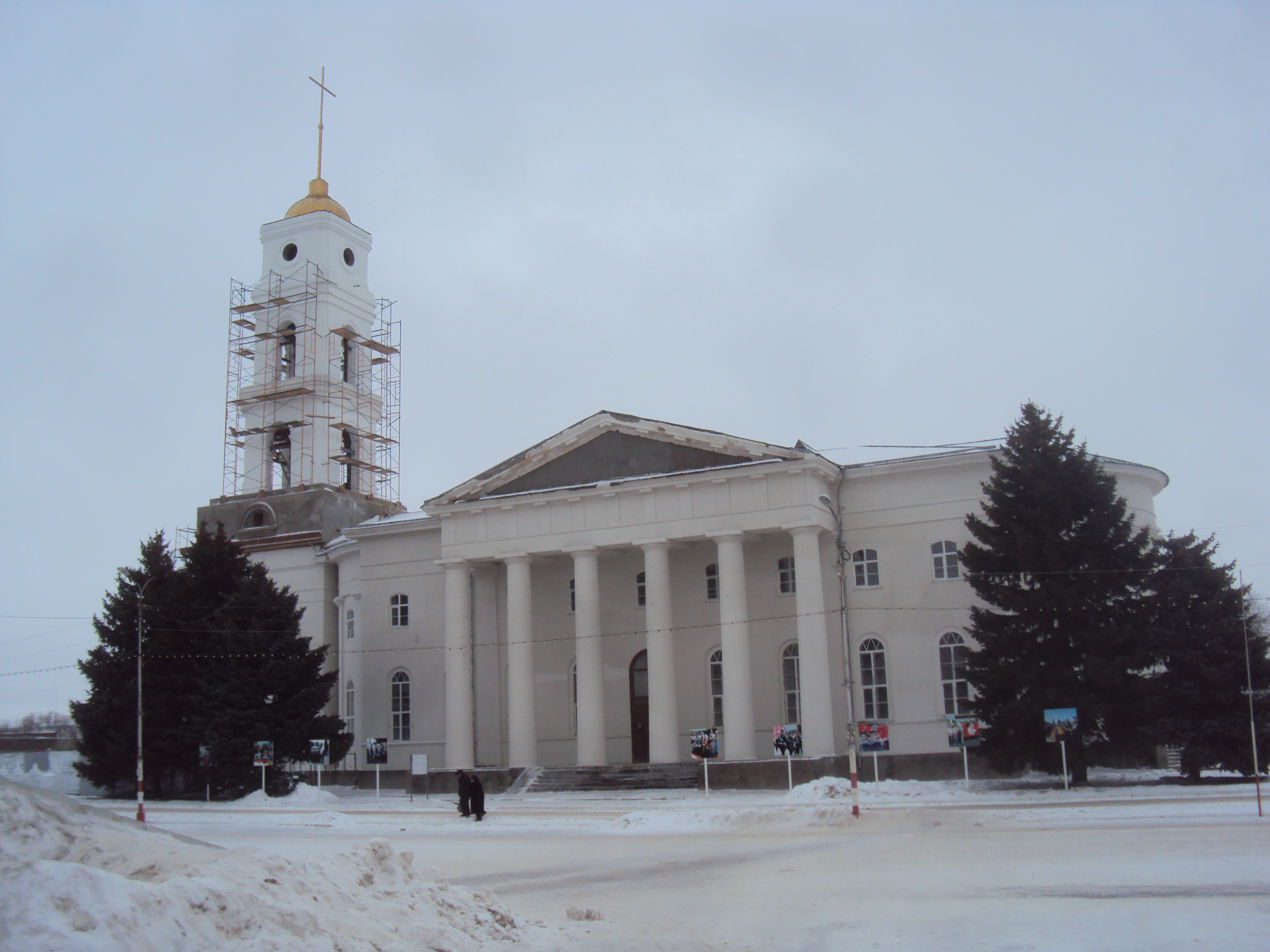
The old Lutheran church in 2017

== Administrative and municipal status ==
Within the framework of administrative divisions, Marks serves as the administrative center of Marksovsky District, even though it is not a part of it. As an administrative division, it is incorporated separately as Marks Town Under Oblast Jurisdiction—an administrative unit with the status equal to that of the districts. As a municipal division, Marks Town Under Oblast Jurisdiction is incorporated within Marksovsky Municipal District as Marks Urban Settlement.
