= Volga German Autonomous Soviet Socialist Republic =

Autonomous republic of the Russian SFSR (1918–1941)

Volga German Autonomous Soviet Socialist Republic Автономная Советская Социалистическая Республика Немцев Поволжья (Russian) Autonome Sozialistische Sowjetrepublik der Wolgadeutschen (German)
- ASSR of the Russian SFSR
- 1918–1941
- Flag State emblem

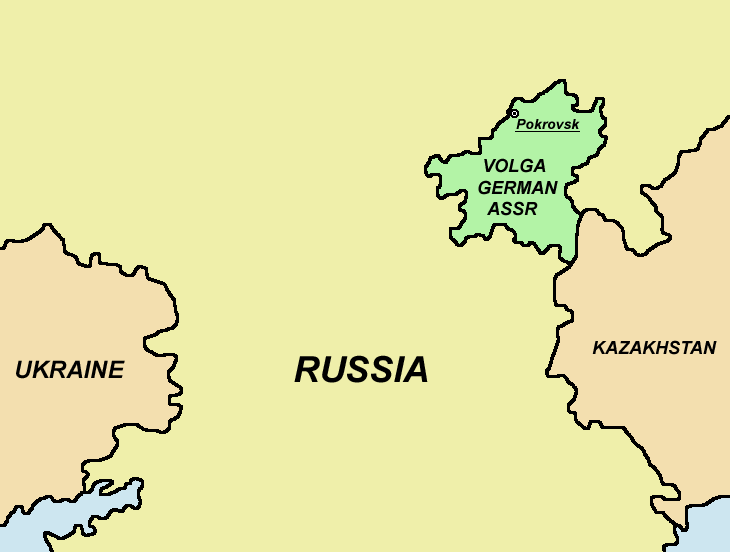
- Capital: Engels^{a}
- Area
  - 1941: 28,400 km^{2} (11,000 sq mi)
- Population
  - 1941: 606,000
- Government
  - Motto: Proletarier aller Länder, vereinigt Euch! (English: Workers of the world, unite!)
- Chairman (Central Executive Committee)
  - October 1918 – March 1919: Ernst Reuter
- Legislature: Supreme Council of the Volga German Autonomous Soviet Socialist Republic
- History
  - Established: 19 October 1918
  - Disestablished: 7 September 1941
- Political subdivisions: 14 cantons
| Preceded by | Succeeded by |
| Samara Governorate | Saratov Oblast; Stalingrad Oblast |
- Today part of: Russia: Volgograd Oblast; Saratov Oblast
- a. Known as "Pokrovsk" or "Kosakenstadt" before 1931.

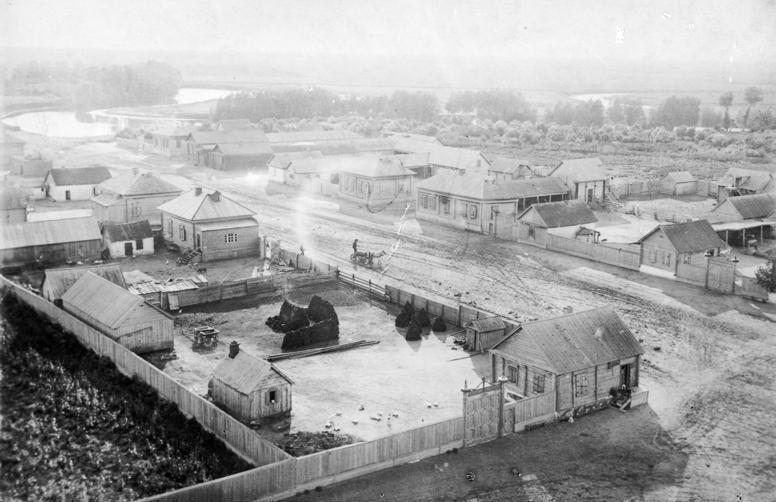
Streckerau, 1920 (Novokamenka).

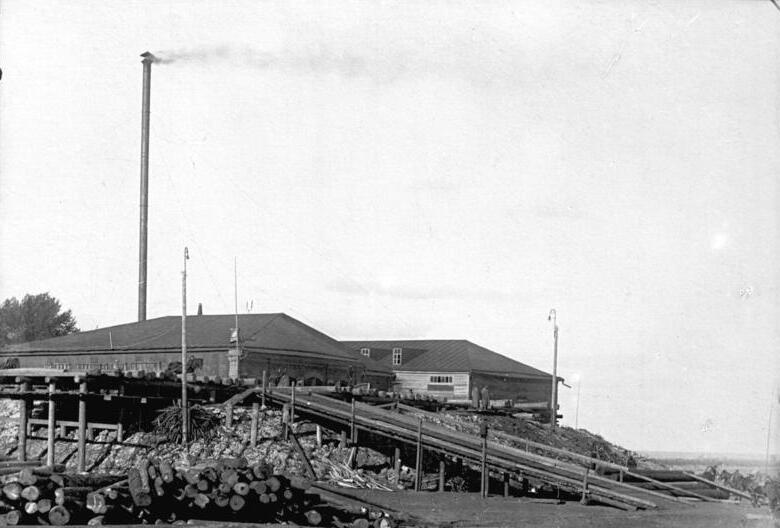
Pokrowsk, 1928 (Engels).

The Volga German Autonomous Soviet Socialist Republic (German: Autonome Sozialistische Sowjetrepublik der Wolgadeutschen; Russian: Автономная Советская Социалистическая Республика Немцев Поволжья, romanized: Avtonomnaya Sovetskaya Sotsialisticheskaya Respublika Nemtsev Povolzh'ya), abbreviated as the Volga German ASSR, was an autonomous republic of the Russian SFSR. Its capital city was Engels (known as Pokrovsk or Kosakenstadt before 1931) located on the Volga River. As a result of the German invasion of the Soviet Union in 1941, the republic was abolished and Volga Germans were exiled.

== History ==
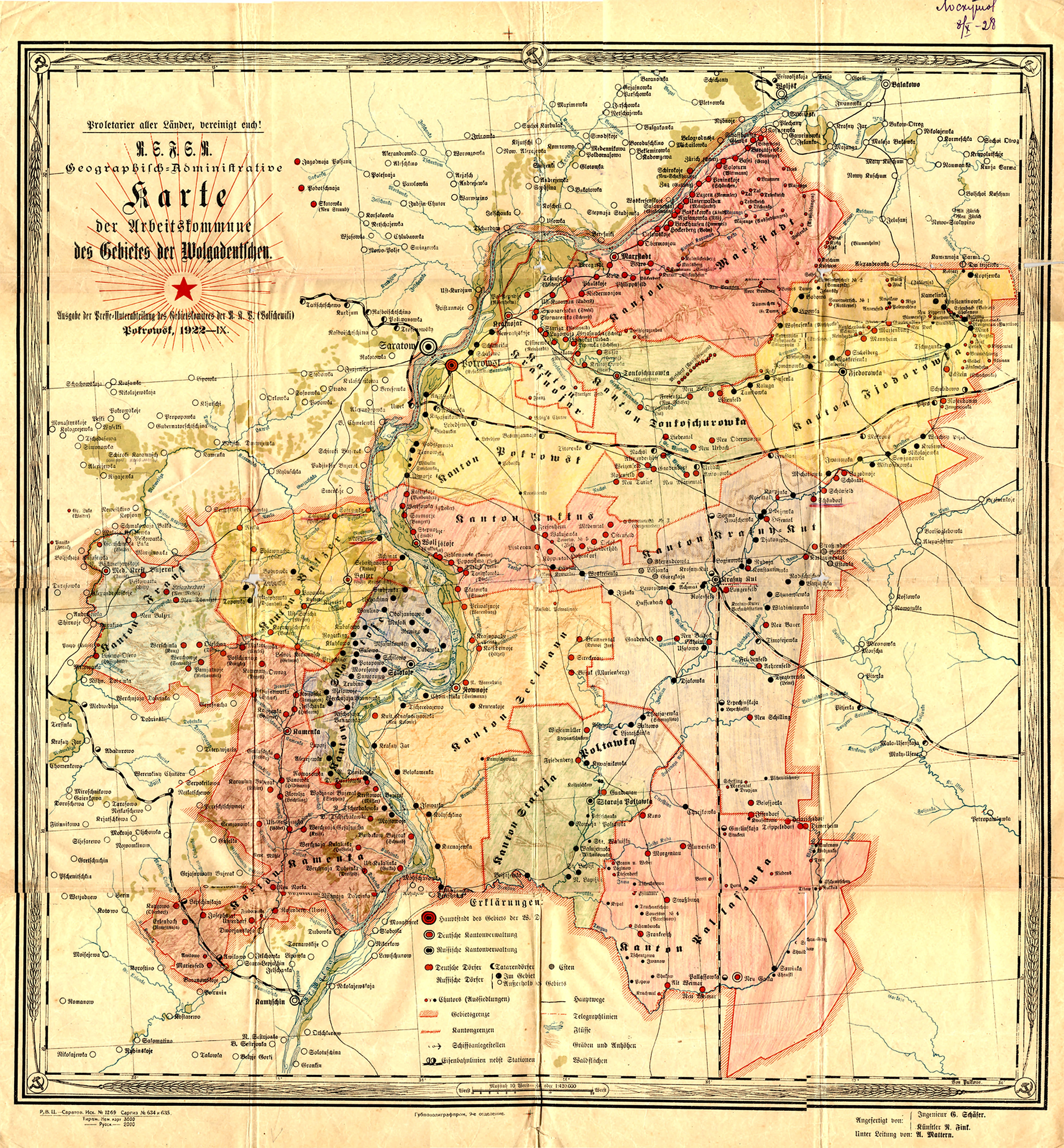
Map of the Labour Commune of Volga Germans, 1922

The first provision of a special status for Volga Germans in the Russian SFSR was created following the October Revolution, by a 29 October (some claim 19 October) 1918 decree of the Soviet government, establishing the Labour Commune of Volga Germans. This gave Soviet Germans a special status among the non-Russians in the USSR. It was restructured as an Autonomous Soviet Socialist Republic on 20 February 1924 (claims of 19 December 1923), by a declaration of the All-Russian Central Executive Committee and the Council of People's Commissars of the Russian SFSR. It became the first national autonomous unit in the Soviet Union after the Donetsk–Krivoy Rog Soviet Republic. It occupied the area of compact settlement of the large Volga German minority in Russia, which numbered almost 1.8 million by 1897. The republic was declared on 6 January 1924.

At the moment of declaration of autonomy, an amnesty was announced. However, it eventually was applied to a small number of people. According to the policy of korenizatsiia, carried out in the 1920s in the Soviet Union, usage of the German language was promoted in official documents and Germans were encouraged to occupy management positions. According to the 1939 census, there were 366,685 Germans in the republic.

By 1 January 1941, the Volga German ASSR included the city of Engels and 22 cantons: Baltsersky, Gmelinsky, Gnadenflyursky, Dobrinsky, Zelmansky, Zolotovsky, Ilovatsky, Kamensky, Krasnoyarsky, Krasnokutsky, Kukkussky, Lizandergeysky, Marientalsky, Marxshtadtsky, Pallasovsky, Staro-Poltavsky, Ternovsky, Untervaldsky, Fedorovsky, Franksky, Ekgeimsky and Erlenbakhsky.

The German invasion of the Soviet Union in 1941 marked the end of the Volga German ASSR. On 28 August 1941, the republic was formally abolished and, out of fear they could act as German collaborators, all Volga Germans were deported to the Kazakh SSR, Altai and Siberia. Many were interned in labor camps merely due to their heritage. On 7 September 1941, the republic was formally extinguished and its territory divided between the Saratov Oblast (15 cantons) and the Stalingrad Oblast (7 cantons).

Following the death of Stalin in 1953, the situation for Volga Germans improved dramatically. In 1964, a second decree was issued, openly admitting the government's guilt in pressing charges against innocent people and urging Soviet citizens to give Volga Germans every assistance in their "economic and cultural expansion". With the existence of a socialist German state in East Germany now a reality of the post-war world, the Volga German ASSR was never reestablished.

Beginning in the early 1980s and accelerating after the fall of the Soviet Union, many Volga Germans have emigrated to Germany by taking advantage of the German law of return, a policy which grants citizenship to all those who can prove to be a refugee or expellee of German ethnic origin or as the spouse or descendant of such a person.

== Population ==
The following table shows population of the ethnic groups of the Volga German ASSR:

| | 1926 census | 1939 census |
|---|---|---|
| Germans | 379,630 (66.4%) | 366,685 (60.5%) |
| Russians | 116,561 (20.4%) | 156,027 (25.7%) |
| Ukrainians | 68,561 (12.0%) | 58,248 (9.6%) |
| Kazakhs | 1,353 (0.2%) | 8,988 (1.5%) |
| Tatars | 2,225 (0.4%) | 4,074 (0.7%) |
| Mordvins | 1,429 (0.3%) | 3,048 (0.5%) |
| Belarusians | 159 (0.0%) | 1,636 (0.3%) |
| Chinese | 5 (0.0%) | 1,284 (0.2%) |
| Jews | 152 (0.0%) | 1,216 (0.2%) |
| Poles | 216 (0.0%) | 756 (0.1%) |
| Estonians | 753 (0.1%) | 521 (0.1%) |
| Others | 710 (0.1%) | 3,869 (0.6%) |
| Total | 571,754 | 606,352 |

== Leaders ==
=== Heads of state ===
| No. | Portrait | Name (Birth–Death) | Tenure | | Notes |
Central Executive Committee Chairmen
| 1 | | Ernst Reuter (1889–1953) | 1918 | 1919 | German statesman, diplomat, Mayor of West Berlin |
| 2 | | Adam Reichert (1869–1936) | 1919 | 1920 | Teacher, journalist, kolkhoznik, shot |
| 3 | | Alexander Dotz (1890–1965) | 1920 | | World War I participant, Russian statesman |
| 4 | | Vasiliy Pakun | 1920 | 1921 | Russian statesman |
| 5 | | Alexander Moor (1889–1938) | 1921 | 1922 | World War I and Russian Civil War participant, Russian general and statesman, Turkmenistani statesman, Uzbekistani statesman, shot in Tashkent |
| 6 | | Wilhelm Kurz (1892–1938) | 1922 | 1924 | Russian statesman, shot |
| 7 | | Johannes Schwab (1888–1938) | 1924 | 1930 | Russian statesman, shot |
| 8 | | Andrew Gleim (1892–1954) | 1930 | 1934 | Russian statesman |
| 9 | | Heinrich Fuchs (?–1938) | 1934 | 1935 | Russian statesman, shot |
| 10 | | Adam Welsch (1893–1937) | 1935 | 1936 | World War I participant, chekist, regional party leader, Russian statesman, shot |
| 11 | | Heinrich Lüft (1899–1937) | 1936 | 1937 | Russian statesman, shot |
| 12 | | David Rosenberger (1896–1956) | 1937 | 1938 | Russian statesman |
Supreme Soviet Chairman
| 1 | | Konrad Hoffmann (1894–1977) | 1938 | 1941 | World War I participant, railway worker, Russian statesman |

=== Heads of government ===
Sovnarkom of the Republic

Created on 12 January 1924, by declaration at the first session of the Central Executive Committee of the Republic.

| No. | Portrait | Name (Birth–Death) | Tenure | | Notes |
|---|---|---|---|---|---|
| 1 | | Wilhelm Kurz (1892–1938) | 1924 | 1929 | Russian statesman, shot |
| 2 | | Andrew Gleim (1892–1954) | 1929 | 1930 | Russian statesman |
| 3 | | Heinrich Fuchs (?–1938) | 1930 | 1935 | Russian statesman, shot |
| 4 | | Adam Welsch (1893–1937) | 1935 | 1936 | World War I participant, chekist, regional party leader, Russian statesman, shot |
| 5 | | Heinrich Lüft (1899–1937) | 1936 | 1937 | Russian statesman, shot |
| 6 | | Wladimir Dalinger (1902–1967) | 1937 | 1938 | Russian Civil War participant, security forces officer, Russian statesman, entrepreneur |
| 7 | | Alexander Heckmann (1908–1994) | 1938 | 1941 | Engineer, Russian statesman, Gulag survivor |

== Maps ==
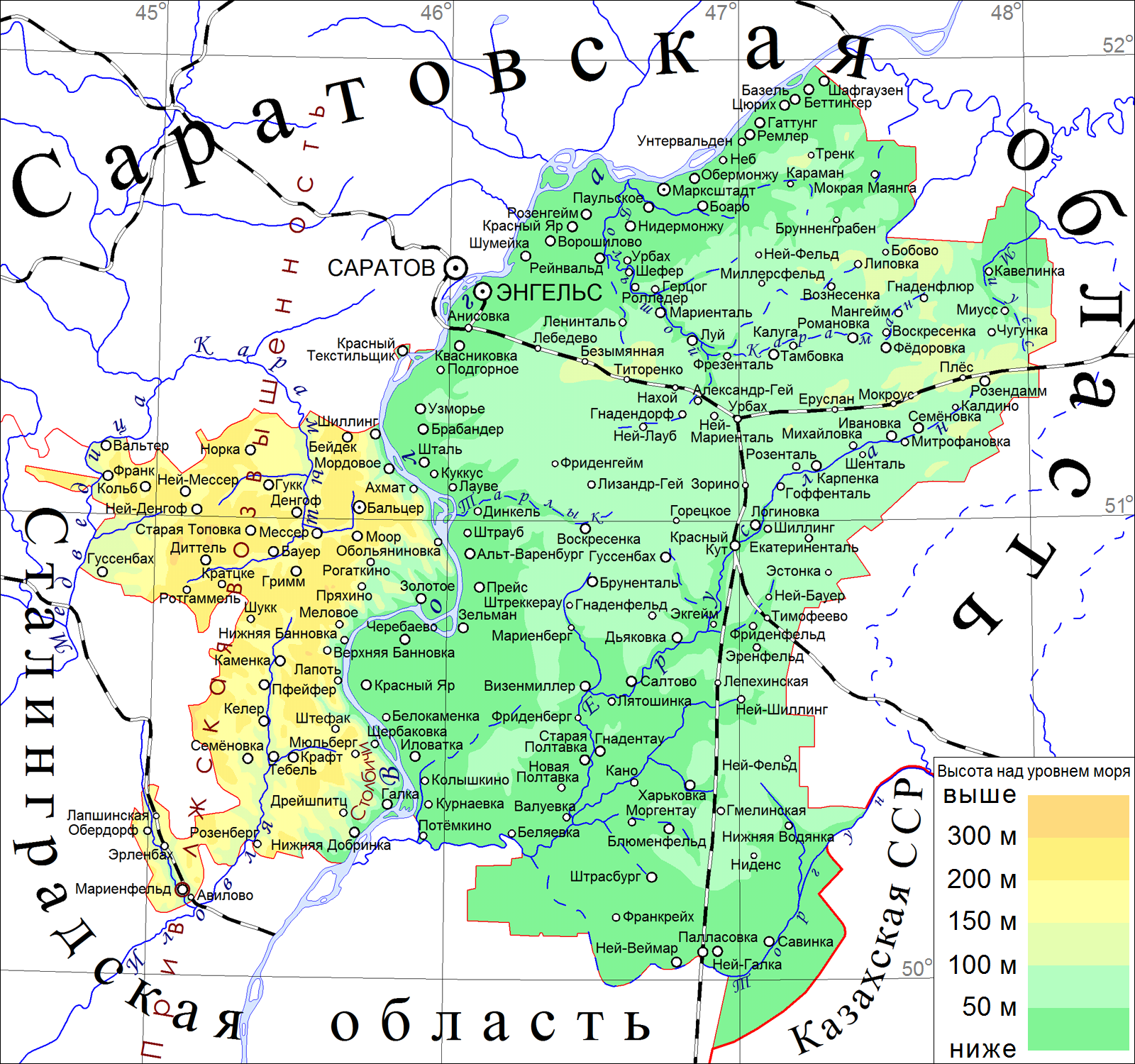
Russian topographic map of the republic.

Administrative division of the republic after its dissolution.

== See also ==
- History of Germans in Russia, Ukraine, and the Soviet Union
- Ethnic Germans
- Baltic Germans
- German Quarter
- Yellow Ukraine
