= Treaty of Brest-Litovsk =

1918 treaty between Soviet Russia and the Central Powers

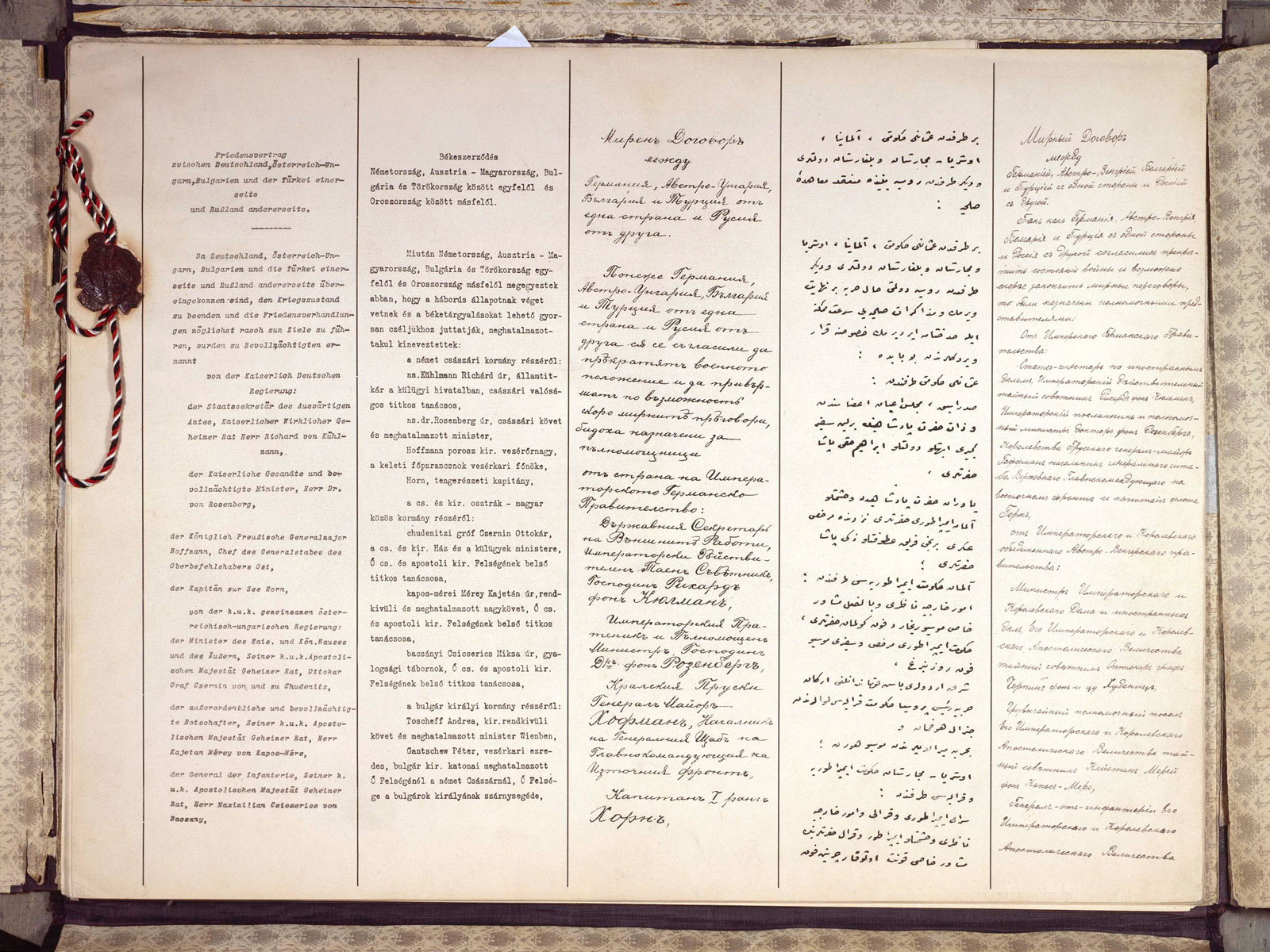
- The first page of the treaty in (from left to right) German, Hungarian, Bulgarian, Ottoman Turkish, and Russian
- Signed: 3 March 1918; 108 years ago
- Location: Brest-Litovsk
- Condition: Ratification
- Parties: Germany; Austria-Hungary; Bulgaria; Ottoman Empire; Soviet Russia
- Languages: Bulgarian; German; Hungarian; Russian; Ottoman Turkish

Full text
- Treaty of Brest-Litovsk at Wikisource

The Treaty of Brest-Litovsk was a separate peace treaty signed on 3 March 1918 between Russia and the Central Powers (Germany, Austria-Hungary, the Ottoman Empire, and Bulgaria), by which Russia withdrew from World War I. The treaty, which followed months of negotiations after the armistice on the Eastern Front in December 1917, was signed at Brest-Litovsk (now Brest, Belarus).

The Soviet delegation was initially headed by Adolph Joffe, and key figures from the Central Powers included Max Hoffmann and Richard von Kühlmann of Germany, Ottokar Czernin of Austria-Hungary, and Talaat Pasha of the Ottoman Empire. In January 1918, the Central Powers demanded secession of all occupied territories of the former Russian Empire. The Soviets sent a new peace delegation led by Leon Trotsky, which aimed to stall the negotiations while awaiting revolutions in Central Europe. A renewed Central Powers offensive launched on February 18 captured large territories in the Baltic region, Belarus, and Ukraine and forced the Soviet side to sue for peace.

Under the terms of the treaty, Russia lost control of Ukraine, Poland, Belarus, Lithuania, Latvia, Estonia, and its Caucasian province of Kars and Batum. The lands comprised 34% of the former empire's population, 54% of its industrial land, 89% of its coalfields, and 26% of its railways. The historian Stephen Kotkin wrote that "no Russian government had ever surrendered so much territory or sovereignty". The Soviet government also confirmed the independence of Finland, which it had recognized in January 1918, and pledged to end its war with the Ukrainian People's Republic, which the Central Powers had recognized under the prior Treaty of Brest-Litovsk (9 February 1918). A supplementary protocol signed in August 1918 required Russia to pay Germany war reparations of six billion marks. The treaty was controversial in Russia, giving a unifying cause to the White movement and opening a rift between the Bolsheviks and the Left Socialist-Revolutionaries, whose representatives withdrew from the Council of People's Commissars after its signing and later rebelled in the Left SR Uprising.

The treaty was annulled by the Armistice of 11 November 1918, in which Germany surrendered to the western Allied Powers. Subsequent attempts by the Soviets to restore power in the lost territories during the Russian Civil War (1917–1922) had mixed results, with the Red Army losing the three Baltic countries but regaining Azerbaijan, Armenia, Belarus, Georgia, and Ukraine by 1921. The border with Turkey established by the treaty was largely affirmed by the Treaty of Kars (1921). Under the Treaty of Rapallo (1922), Russia and Germany renounced all territorial and financial claims against each other.

== Background ==
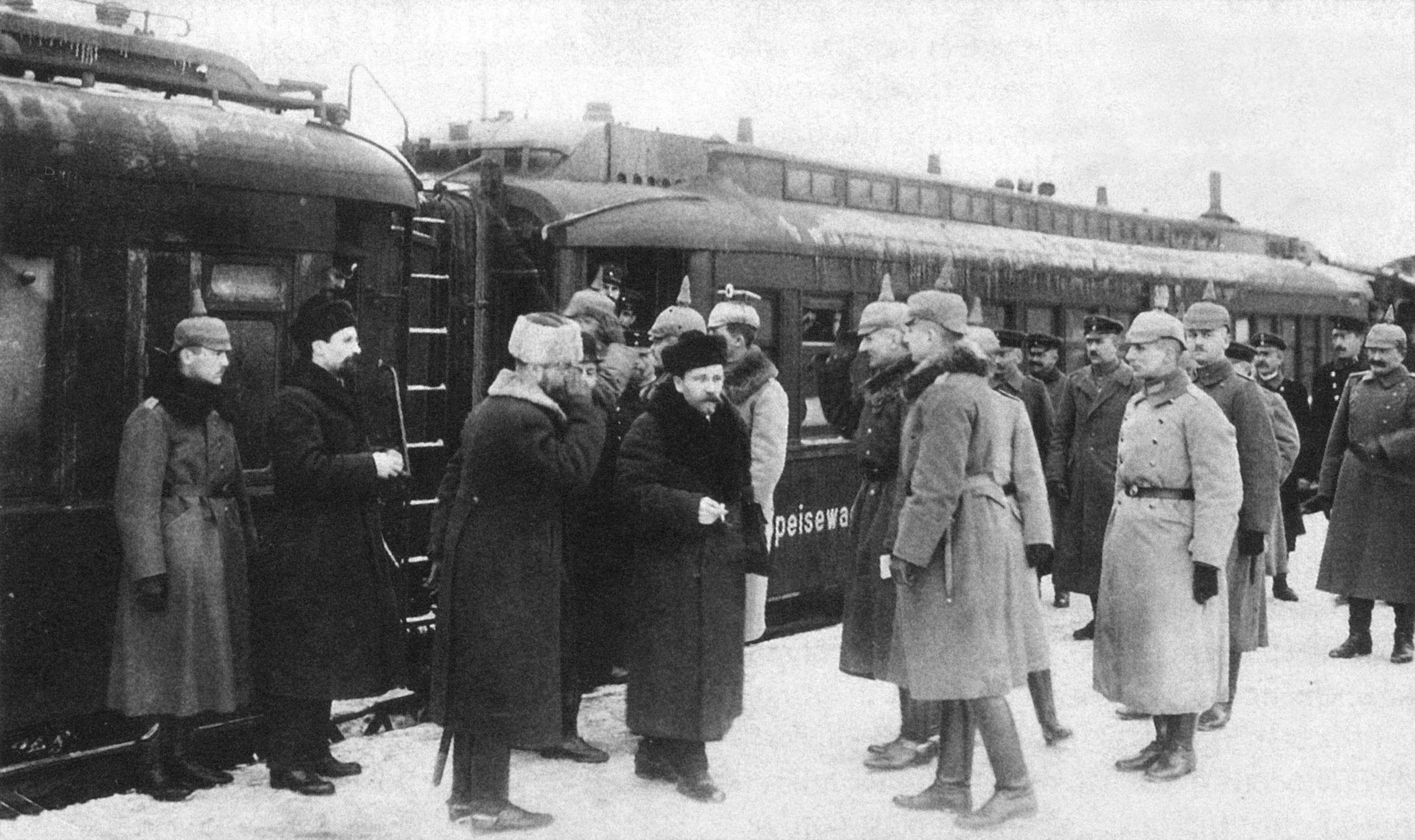
Lev Kamenev arriving at Brest-Litovsk

By 1917, Germany, Austria-Hungary, and Russia were stuck in a stalemate on the Eastern Front of World War I and the Russian economy had nearly collapsed under the strain of the war effort. The large numbers of war casualties and persistent food shortages in the major urban centers brought about civil unrest, known as the February Revolution, that forced Tsar Nicholas II to abdicate. The Russian Provisional Government that replaced the Tsar in early 1917 continued the war. Foreign Minister Pavel Milyukov sent the Entente Powers a telegram, known as the Milyukov note, affirming to them that the Provisional Government would continue the war with the same war aims that the former Russian Empire had. The pro-war Provisional Government was opposed by the self-proclaimed Petrograd Soviet of Workers' and Soldiers' Deputies, dominated by leftist parties. Its Order No. 1 called for an overriding mandate to soldier committees rather than army officers. The Soviet started to form its own paramilitary power, the Red Guards, in March 1917.

The continuing war led Germany to agree to a suggestion that they should favour the opposition Communist Party (Bolsheviks), who were proponents of Russia's withdrawal from the war. Therefore, in April 1917, Germany transported Bolshevik leader Vladimir Lenin and 31 supporters in a sealed train from exile in Switzerland to Finland Station, Petrograd. Upon his arrival in Petrograd, Lenin proclaimed his April Theses, which included a call for turning all political power over to workers' and soldiers' soviets (councils) and an immediate withdrawal of Russia from the war. At around the same time, the United States entered the war, potentially shifting the balance of the war against the Central Powers. Throughout 1917, Bolsheviks called for the overthrow of the Provisional Government and an end to the war. Following the disastrous failure of the Kerensky offensive, discipline in the Russian Army deteriorated completely. Soldiers would disobey orders, often under the influence of Bolshevik agitation, and set up soldiers' committees to take control of their units after deposing the officers.

The defeat and ongoing hardships of war led to anti-government riots in Petrograd, the "July Days" of 1917. Several months later, on 7 November [O.S. 25 October], Red Guards seized the Winter Palace and arrested the Provisional Government in what is known as the October Revolution.

A top priority of the newly established Soviet government was to end the war. On 8 November [O.S. 26 October], Lenin signed the Decree on Peace, which was approved by the Second Congress of the Soviet of Workers', Soldiers', and Peasants' Deputies. The Decree called "upon all the belligerent nations and their governments to start immediate negotiations for peace" and proposed an immediate withdrawal of Russia from World War I. Leon Trotsky was appointed Commissar of Foreign Affairs in the new Bolshevik government. In preparation for peace talks with the representatives of the German government and the representatives of the other Central Powers, Trotsky appointed his good friend Adolph Joffe to represent the Bolsheviks at the peace conference.

== Peace negotiations ==
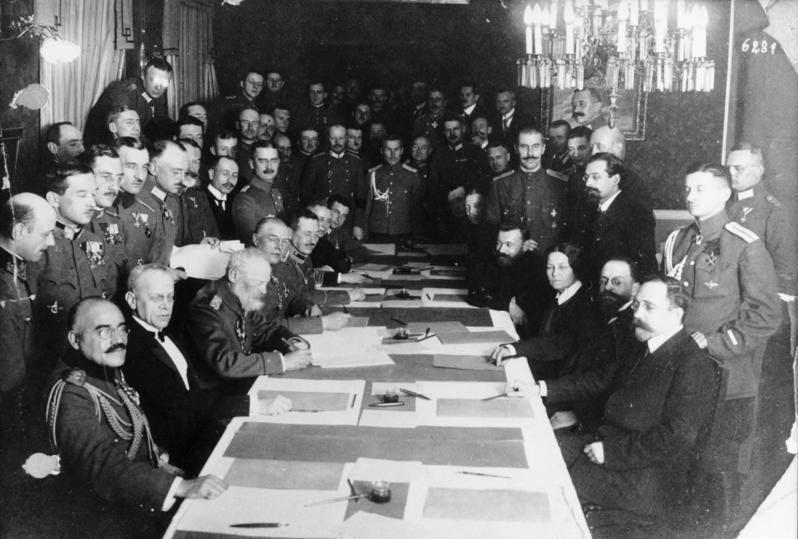
Signing of the armistice between Russia and Germany on 15 December 1917. Prince Leopold of Bavaria signing the treaty

On 15 December 1917, an armistice between Soviet Russia and the Central Powers was concluded. On 22 December, peace negotiations began in Brest-Litovsk.

Arrangements for the conference were the responsibility of General Max Hoffmann, the chief of staff of the Central Powers' forces on the Eastern Front (German: Oberkommando-Ostfront, Ober Ost). The delegations that had negotiated the armistice were made stronger. Prominent additions on the Central Powers' side were the foreign ministers of Germany, Richard von Kühlmann, and Austria-Hungary, Count Ottokar Czernin, both the Ottoman grand vizier Talaat Pasha and Foreign Minister Nassimy Bey. The Bulgarians were headed by Minister of Justice Popoff, who was later joined by Prime Minister Vasil Radoslavov.

The Soviet delegation was led by Joffe, who had already led their armistice negotiators, but his group was made more cohesive by eliminating most of the representatives of social groups, like peasants and sailors, and the addition of tsarist general Aleksandr Samoilo and the noted Marxist historian Mikhail Pokrovsky. It still included Anastasia Bitsenko, a former assassin, representing the Left Socialist-Revolutionaries who were at odds with the Bolsheviks. Again, the negotiators met in the fortress in Brest-Litovsk, and the delegates were housed in temporary wooden structures in its courtyards because the city had been burnt to the ground in 1915 by the retreating Russian army. They were cordially welcomed by the German commander of the Eastern Front, Prince Leopold of Bavaria, who sat with Joffe on the head table at the opening banquet with one hundred guests. As they had during the armistice negotiations, both sides continued to eat dinner and supper together amicably intermingled in the officers' mess.

When the conference convened Kühlmann asked Joffe to present the Russian conditions for peace. He made six points, all variations of the Bolshevik slogan of peace with "no annexations or indemnities". The Central Powers accepted the principles "but only in case all belligerents [including the nations of the Entente] without exception pledge themselves to do the same". They did not intend to annex territories occupied by force. Joffe telegraphed the news to Petrograd. Thanks to informal chatting in the mess, one of Hoffmann's aides, Colonel Friedrich Brinckmann, realized that the Russians had optimistically misinterpreted the Central Powers' meaning. It fell to Hoffmann to set matters straight at dinner on 27 December: Poland, Lithuania and Courland, already occupied by the Central Powers, were determined to separate from Russia on the principle of self-determination that the Bolsheviks themselves espoused. Joffe "looked as if he had received a blow on the head". Pokrovsky wept as he asked how they could speak of "peace without annexations when Germany was tearing eighteen provinces away from the Russian state". The Germans and the Austro-Hungarians planned to annex slices of Polish territory and to set up a rump Polish state with what remained. The Baltic governorates were to become client states ruled by German princes. Czernin was beside himself that this hitch that was slowing the negotiations; self-determination was anathema to his government and they urgently needed grain from the east because Vienna was on the verge of starvation. He proposed to make a separate peace. Kühlmann warned that if they negotiated separately, Germany would immediately withdraw all its divisions from the Austrian front; Czernin dropped that threat. The food crisis in Vienna was eventually eased by "forced drafts of grain from Hungary, Poland, and Romania and by a last moment contribution from Germany of 450 truck-loads of flour". At Russia's request, they agreed to recess the talks for 12 days.

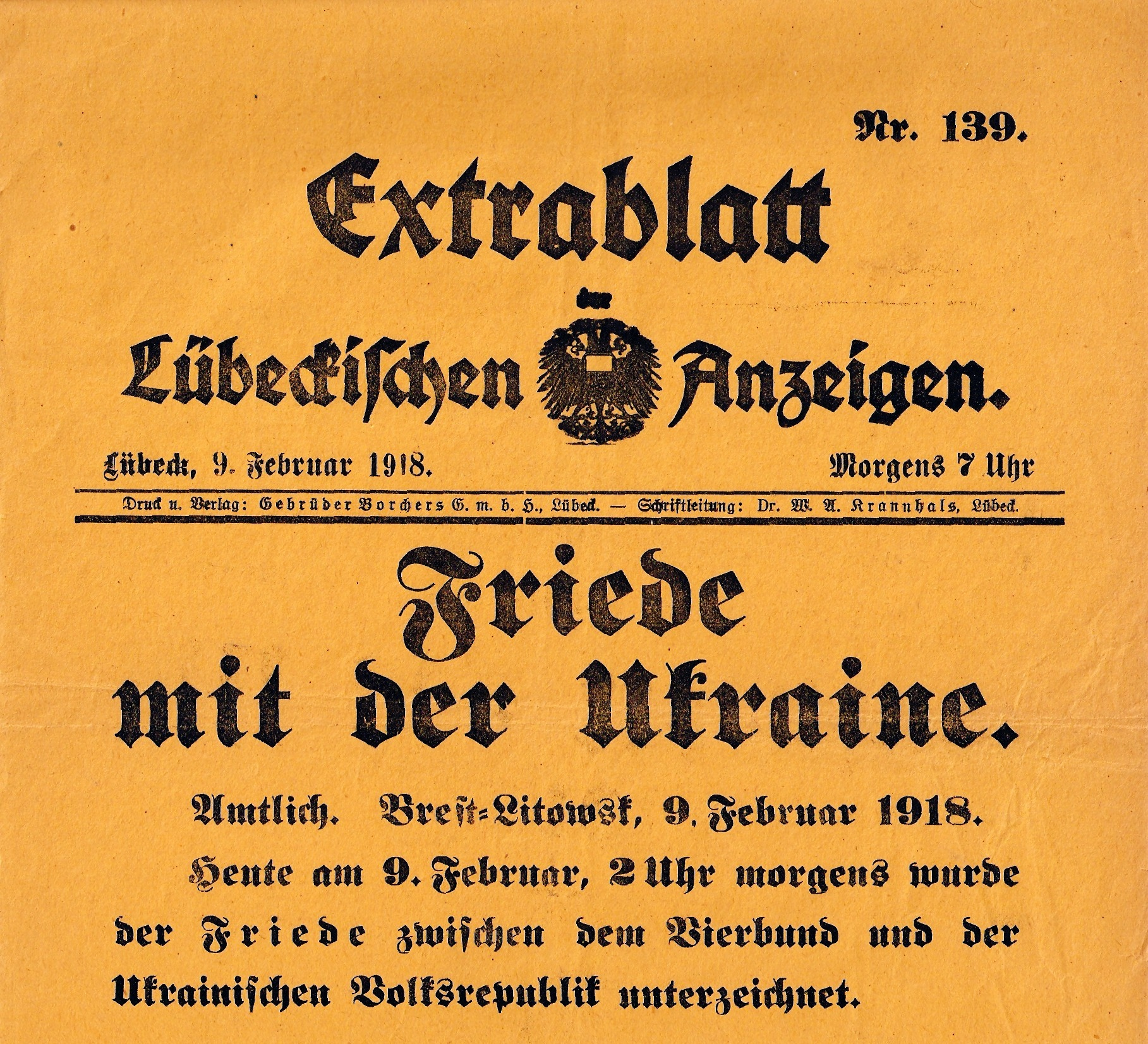
Special edition of the Lübeckischen Anzeigen, with the headline as: "Peace with Ukraine"

The Soviets' only hopes were that time would make their allies agree to join the negotiations or that the western European proletariat would revolt and so their best strategy was to prolong the negotiations. As Trotsky wrote, "To delay negotiations, there must be someone to do the delaying". Therefore, Trotsky replaced Joffe as the leader.

On the other side were significant political realignments. On New Year's Day in Berlin, Kaiser Wilhelm II insisted that Hoffmann reveal his views on the future German–Polish border. He advocated taking a small slice of Poland; Paul von Hindenburg and Erich Ludendorff wanted much more. They were furious with Hoffmann for breaching the chain of command and wanted him to be dismissed and sent to command a division. The Kaiser refused, but Ludendorff no longer spoke with Hoffmann on the telephone since the communication was now through an intermediary.

The German Supreme Commanders were also furious at ruling out of annexations, contending that the peace "must increase Germany's material power". They denigrated Kühlmann and pressed for additional territorial acquisitions. When Hindenburg was asked why they needed the Baltic provinces he replied, "To secure my left flank for when the next war happens." However, the most profound transformation was that a delegation from the Ukrainian Rada, which had declared independence from Russia, had arrived at Brest-Litovsk. They would make peace if they were given the Polish city of Cholm and its surroundings, and they would provide desperately needed grain. Czernin no longer was desperate for a prompt settlement with the Russians.

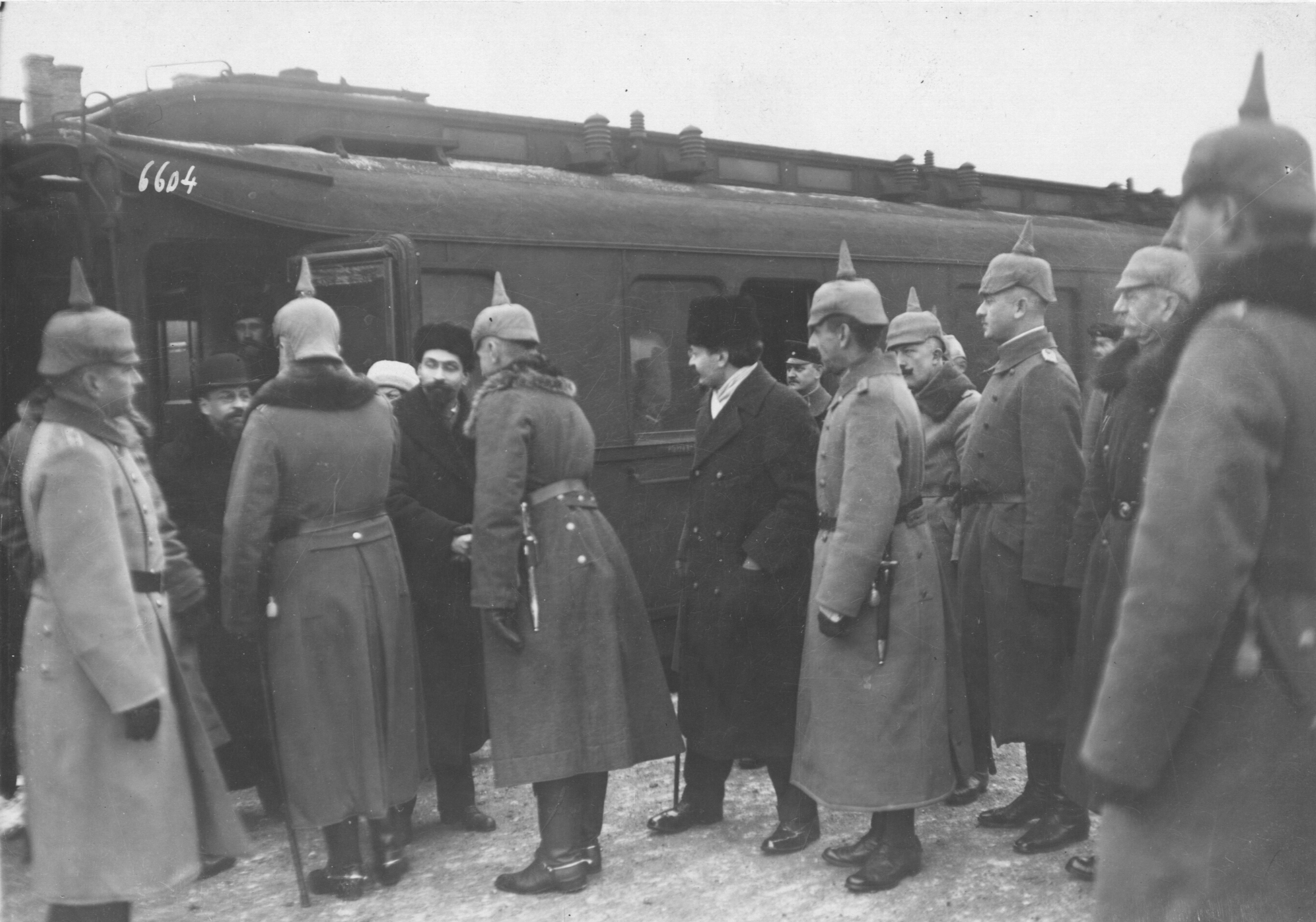
Trotsky being greeted by German officers

When they reconvened, Trotsky declined the invitation to meet Prince Leopold and terminated shared meals and other sociable interactions with the representatives of the Central Powers. Day after day, Trotsky "engaged Kühlmann in debate, rising to subtle discussion of first principles that ranged far beyond the concrete territorial issues that divided them". The Central Powers signed a peace treaty with Ukraine during the night of 8–9 February even though the Russians had retaken Kiev. German and Austro-Hungarian troops entered Ukraine to prop up the Rada. Finally, Hoffmann broke the impasse with the Russians by focusing the discussion on maps of the future boundaries. Trotsky summarised their situation "Germany and Austria-Hungary are cutting off from the domains of the former Russian Empire territories more than 150,000 square kilometers in size". He was granted a nine-day recess for the Russians to decide whether to sign.

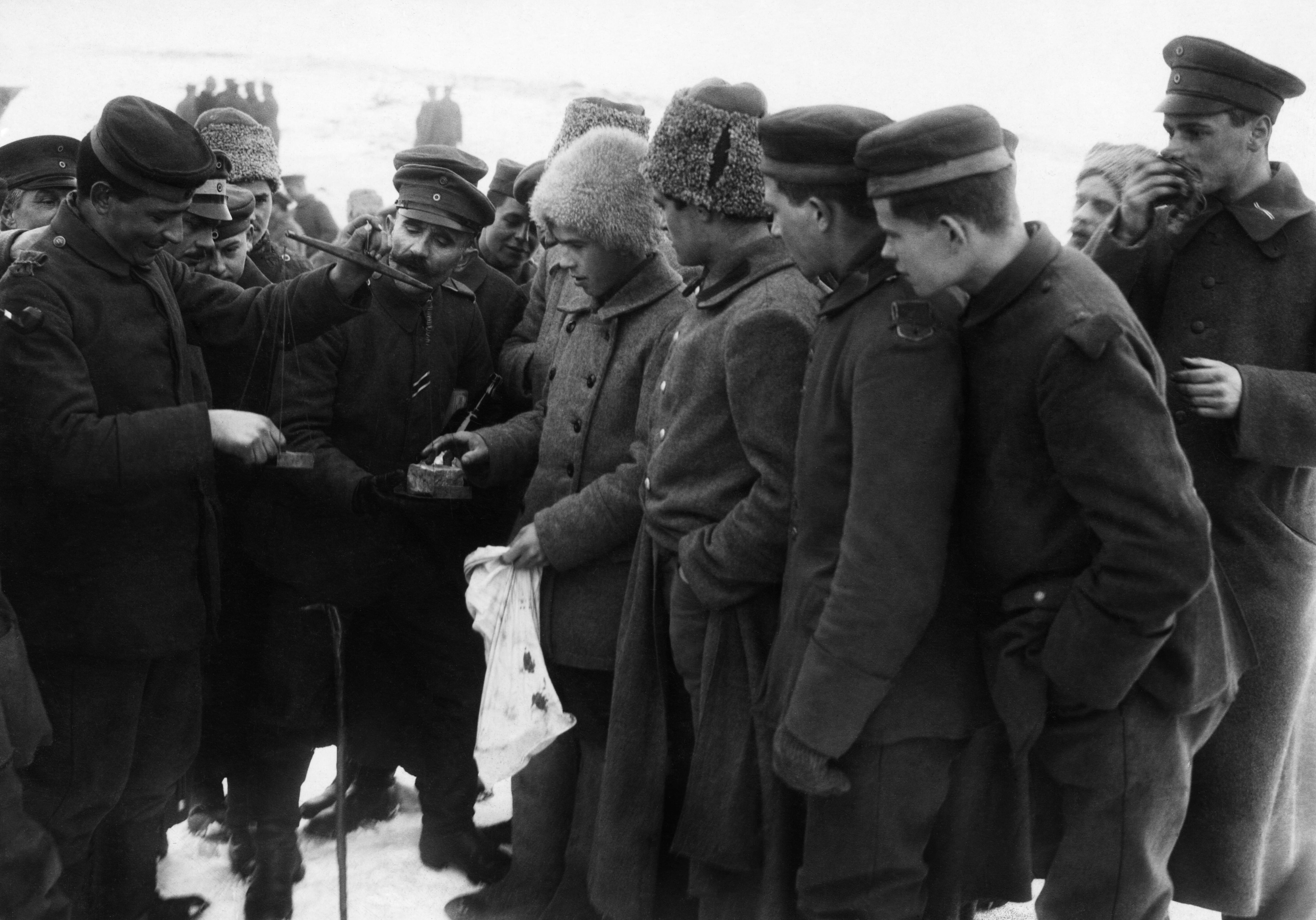
German and Soviet troops gathering together, February 1918

In Petrograd, Trotsky argued passionately against signing and proposed that instead, "they should announce the termination of the war and demobilization without signing any peace." Privately, in correspondence with Count Otto von Czernin, Trotsky had expressed his willingness to relent to peace terms upon the resumption of a German offensive although with moral dissent. Lenin was for signing rather than having an even more ruinous treaty forced on them after a few more weeks of military humiliation. The "Left Communists", led by Nikolai Bukharin and Karl Radek, were sure that Germany, Austria-Hungary, the Ottoman Empire, and Bulgaria were all on the verge of revolution. They wanted to continue the war with a newly raised revolutionary force while awaiting these upheavals. Consequently, Lenin agreed to Trotsky's formula – a position summed up as "no war – no peace" – which was announced when the negotiators reconvened on 10 February 1918. The Soviets thought that their stalling was succeeding until 16 February when Hoffmann notified them that the war would resume in two days, when 53 divisions advanced against the near-empty Soviet trenches. On the night of 18 February, the Central Committee supported Lenin's resolution that they sign the treaty by a margin of seven to five. Hoffmann kept advancing until 23 February when he presented new terms that included the withdrawal of all Soviet troops from Ukraine and Finland. The Soviets were given 48 hours to open negotiations with the Germans, and another 72 to conclude them. Lenin told the Central Committee that "you must sign this shameful peace in order to save the world revolution". If they did not agree, he would resign. He was supported by six Central Committee members, opposed by three, with Trotsky and three others abstaining. Debate in the All-Russian Central Executive Committee was intense, with Left SRs jeering Lenin as a traitor. Lenin explained that they must "concede space...in order to win time." The measure passed 116 to 85.

Trotsky resigned as foreign minister and was replaced by Georgy Chicherin.

When Sokolnikov arrived at Brest-Litovsk, he declared "we are going to sign immediately the treaty presented to us as an ultimatum but at the same time refuse to enter into any discussion of its terms". The treaty was signed at 17:50 on 3 March 1918.

Kühlmann, invited Emil Orlík, a Viennese Secessionist and artist, to attend the conference. He composed portraits of all the participants along with a series of smaller caricatures. These were gathered together into a book, copies of which were distributed to each participant at the end of the negotiations.

== Terms ==
=== Signing ===
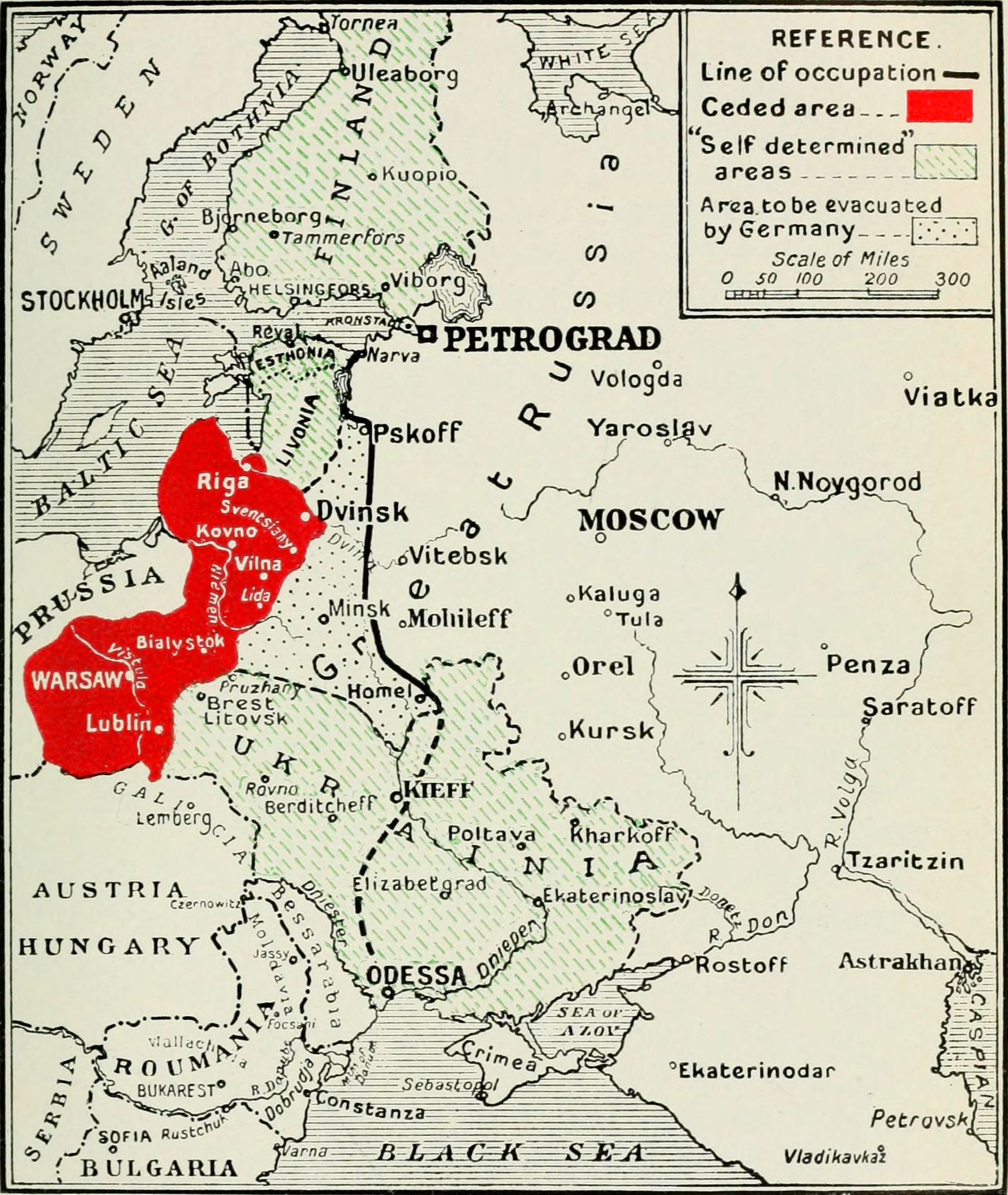
Borders drawn up in the treaty

The Treaty of Brest-Litovsk was signed on 3 March 1918. The signatories were Soviet Russia signed by Grigori Sokolnikov on the one side and Germany, Austria-Hungary, Bulgaria, and the Ottoman Empire on the other.

The treaty marked Russia's final withdrawal from World War I as an enemy of her co-signatories, on severe terms. In all, the treaty took away territory that included a quarter of the population and the industry of the former Russian Empire and nine tenths of its operational coal mines.

=== Territorial cessions in Eastern Europe ===
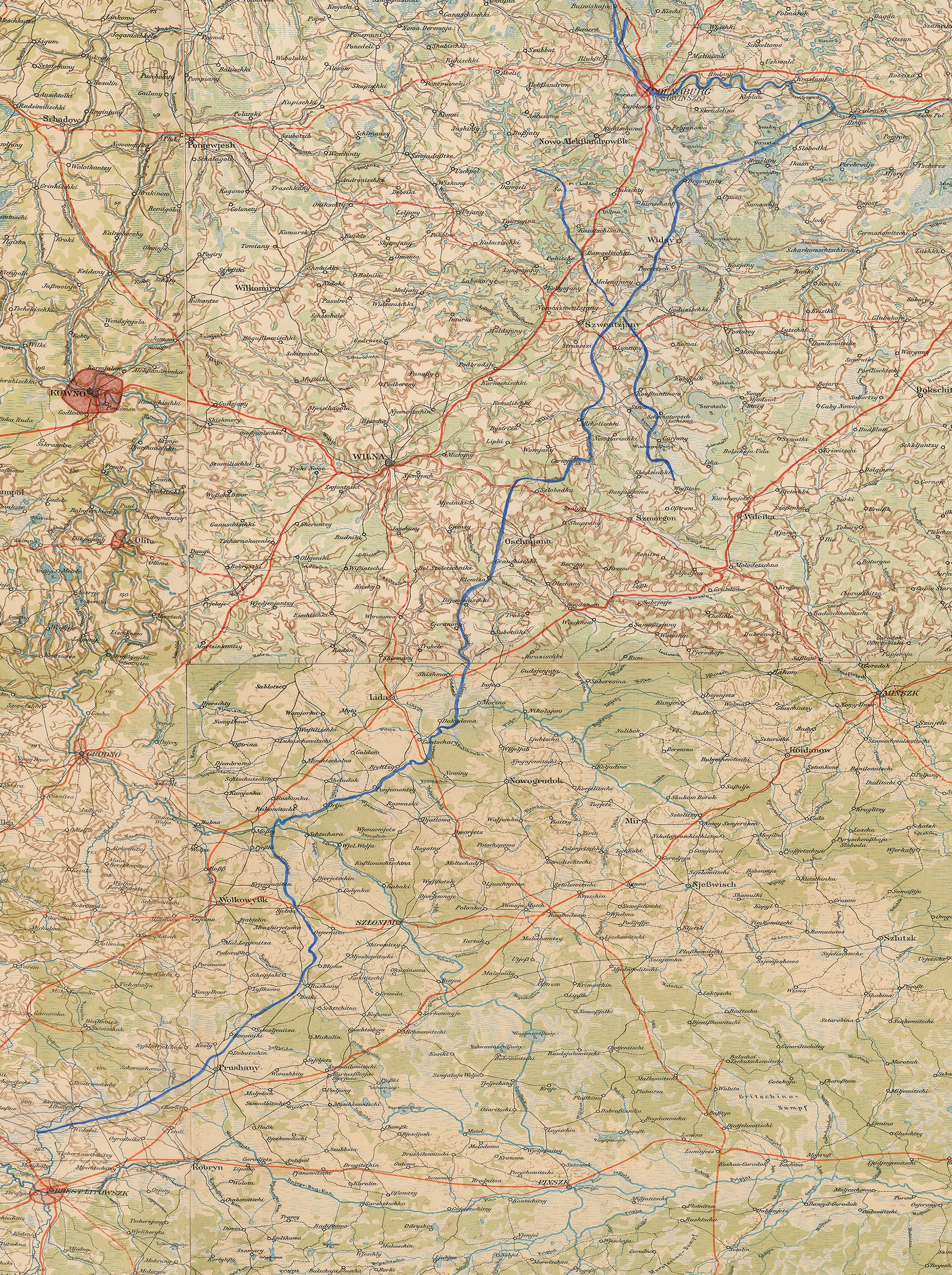
Excerpt of the map annexed to the treaty, demarcation line in blue

Russia renounced all territorial claims in Finland (whose independence it had already recognized), Estonia, Latvia, Lithuania, most of Belarus, and Ukraine. The territory of the Kingdom of Poland was not mentioned in the treaty, as the Germans refused to recognize the existence of any Polish representatives, which in turn led to Polish protests. The treaty stated that "Germany and Austria-Hungary intend to determine the future fate of these territories in agreement with their populations." Most of the territories were in effect ceded to Germany, which intended to have them become economic and political dependencies, where the local German-speaking minority would be the ruling elite. New monarchies were to be created in Lithuania and the proposed "United Baltic Duchy" (which was planned to comprise Latvia and Estonia). Later in 1918, German aristocrats Wilhelm Karl, Duke of Urach (for Lithuania), and Adolf Friedrich, Duke of Mecklenburg-Schwerin (for the planned United Baltic Duchy), were nominally appointed, but in reality never became, rulers of these envisaged new pro-German countries.

This plan was detailed by Ludendorff, who wrote, "German prestige demands that we should hold a strong protecting hand, not only over German citizens, but over all Germans."

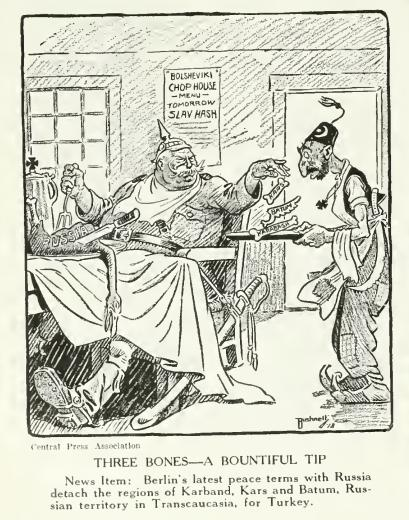
"Three bones—a bountiful tip", a political cartoon from 1918 by American cartoonist E. A. Bushnell

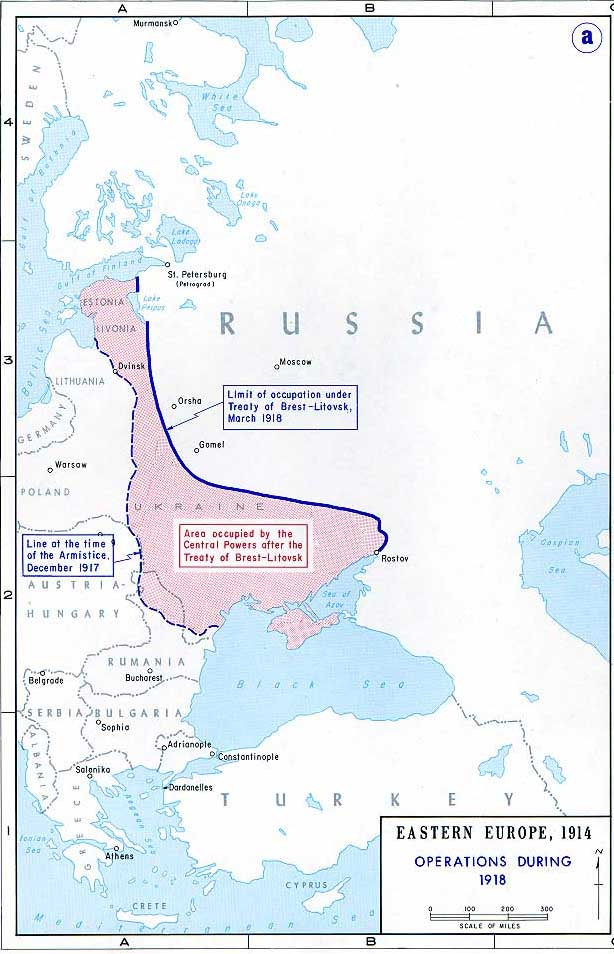
Territorial claims ceded by Soviet Russia to the Central Powers under the Treaty of Brest-Litovsk

The occupation of the western part of the former Russian Empire ultimately proved a costly blunder for Berlin, as over one million German troops lay sprawled out from Poland nearly to the Caspian Sea, all idle and depriving Germany of badly needed manpower in France. The hopes of using Ukraine's grain and coal proved abortive; in addition, the local population became increasingly hostile to the occupation. Revolts and guerrilla warfare began breaking out all over the occupied territory, many of them inspired by Bolshevik agents. German troops also had to intervene in the Finnish Civil War, and Ludendorff became increasingly concerned that his troops were being affected by propaganda emanating from Moscow, which was one of the reasons he was reluctant to transfer divisions to the Western Front. The attempt at establishing an independent Ukrainian state under German guidance was unsuccessful as well. However, Ludendorff completely ruled out the idea of marching on Moscow and Petrograd to remove the Bolshevik government from power.

Germany transferred hundreds of thousands of veteran troops to the Western Front for the 1918 Spring Offensive, which shocked the Allied Powers but ultimately failed. Some Germans later blamed the occupation for significantly weakening the Spring Offensive. The Germans began slowly but steadily withdrawing personnel from the occupied territories from east to west as the troop transfers to the Western Front continued throughout 1918. Local independence movements, particularly those based in what is now Belarus and Ukraine, moved in to fill the void the Germans left behind and established themselves in the newly freed territories.

Belarus and Ukraine became independent, while Poland, Estonia, Livonia, and Courland become protectorates of the German Empire. Later, Bessarabia united with Romania.

Russia lost 34% of its population, 54% of its industrial land, 89% of its coalfields, and 26% of its railways. Russia was also fined 6 billion marks.

=== Territorial cessions in the Caucasus ===
At the insistence of Talaat Pasha, the treaty declared that the territory the Ottoman Empire surrendered to Russia in the Russo-Turkish War (1877–1878), specifically Ardahan, Kars, and Batumi, were to be returned. At the time of the treaty, this territory was under the effective control of Armenian and Georgian forces.

Paragraph 3 of Article IV of the treaty stated that:

The districts of Ardahan, Kars, and Batum will likewise and without delay be cleared of Russian troops. Russia will not interfere in the reorganization of the national and international relations of these districts, but leave it to the population of these districts to carry out this reorganization in agreement with the neighbouring states, especially with the Ottoman Empire.

Armenia, Azerbaijan, and Georgia rejected the treaty and instead declared independence. They formed the short-lived Transcaucasian Democratic Federative Republic.

=== Soviet-German financial agreement of August 1918 ===
In the wake of Soviet repudiation of Tsarist bonds, the nationalisation of foreign-owned property and confiscation of foreign assets, and Entente forces landing on Russian territory, the Soviets and Germany signed an additional agreement on 27 August 1918. The Soviets agreed to pay six billion marks in compensation for German losses.

ARTICLE 2 Russia shall pay Germany six billion marks as compensation for losses sustained by Germans through Russian measures; at the same time corresponding claims on Russia's part are taken into account, and the value of supplies confiscated in Russia by German military forces after the conclusion of peace is taken into account.

The amount was equal to 300 million rubles. The Soviets additionally agreed to sell Germany 25% of the output of the Baku oil fields. Three secret clauses provided for German military action against Entente forces on Russian soil, as well as the expulsion of British troops from Baku.

== Lasting effects ==
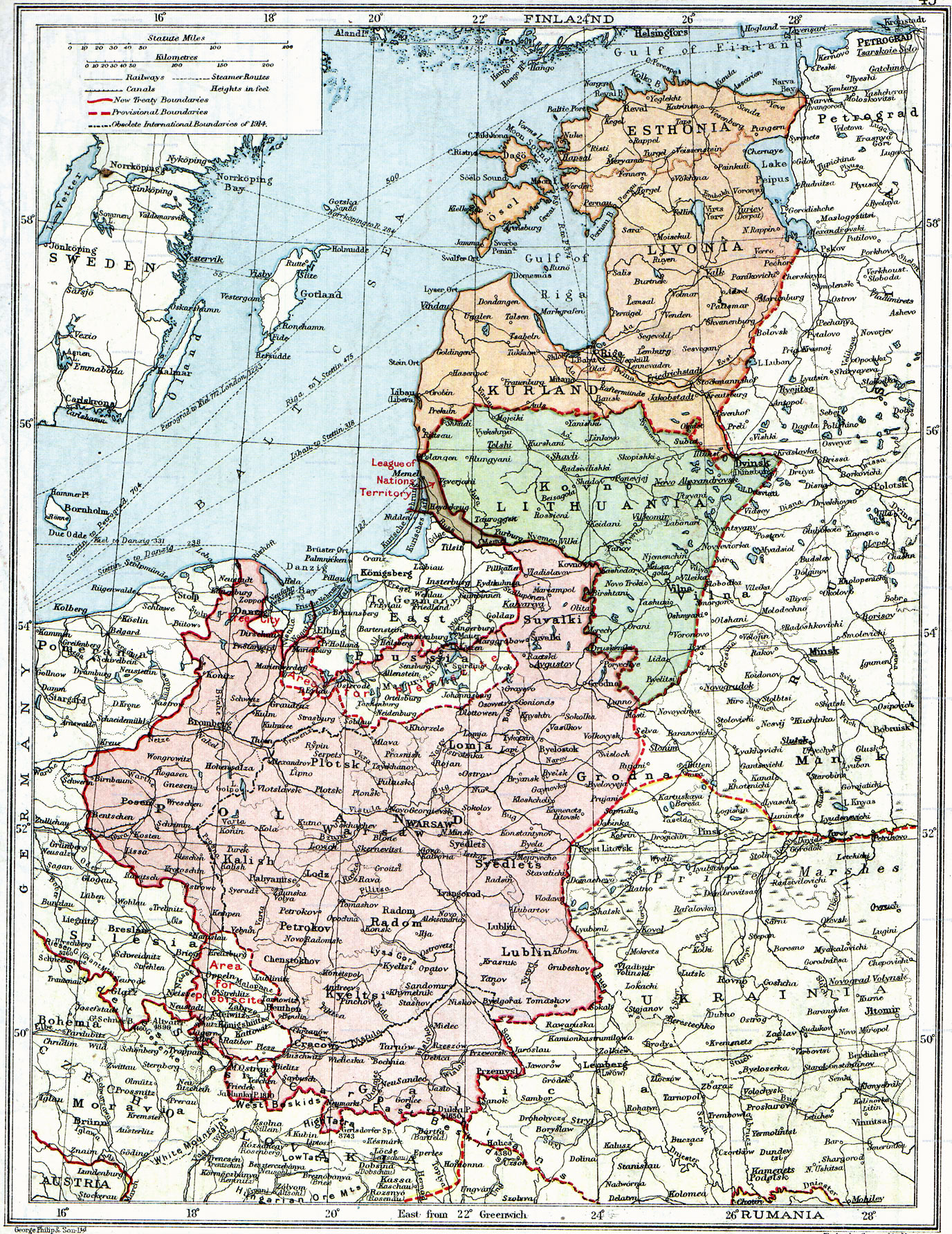
"Poland & The New Baltic States": a map from a 1920 British atlas, showing borders left undefined between the treaties of Brest-Litovsk, Versailles and Riga

The treaty freed up a million German soldiers for the Western Front and allowed Germany to use "much of Russia's food supply, industrial base, fuel supplies, and communications with Western Europe". According to historian Spencer Tucker, the Allied Powers felt that

The treaty was the ultimate betrayal of the Allied cause and sowed the seeds for the Cold War. With Brest-Litovsk, the spectre of German domination in Eastern Europe threatened to become reality, and the Allies now began to think seriously about military intervention [in Russia].

For the Western Allied Powers, the terms that Germany had imposed on Russia were interpreted as a warning of what to expect if the Central Powers won the war. Between Brest-Litovsk and the point when the situation in the Western Front became dire, some officials in the German government and the high command began to favour offering more lenient terms to the Allied Powers in exchange for their recognition of German gains in the east.

The treaty marked a significant contraction of the territory controlled by the Bolsheviks or that they could lay claim to as effective successors of the Russian Empire. While the independence of Poland was already accepted by them in principle, and Lenin had signed a document accepting the Finnish independence, the loss of Ukraine and the Baltics created, from the Bolshevik perspective, dangerous bases of anti-Bolshevik military activity in the subsequent Russian Civil War (1917–1923). However, Bolshevik control of Ukraine and Transcaucasia was, at the time, fragile or non-existent.

Many Russian nationalists and some revolutionaries were furious at the Bolsheviks' acceptance of the treaty and joined forces to fight them. Non-Russians who inhabited the lands lost by Bolshevik Russia in the treaty saw the changes as an opportunity to set up independent states.

Immediately after the signing of the treaty, Lenin moved the Soviet government from Petrograd to Moscow to prevent Germany from capturing the Russian capital in the event of an invasion. Trotsky blamed the peace treaty on the bourgeoisie, the social revolutionaries, Tsarist diplomats, Tsarist bureaucrats, "the Kerenskys, Tseretelis and Chernovs", the Tsarist regime, and the "petty-bourgeois compromisers".

The treaty opened a permanent rift between the Bolsheviks and Left SRs. In July 1918 the Left SRs assassinated German Ambassador Wilhelm von Mirbach in the hopes that it would induce Germany to annul the treaty, leading to the Left SR Uprising.

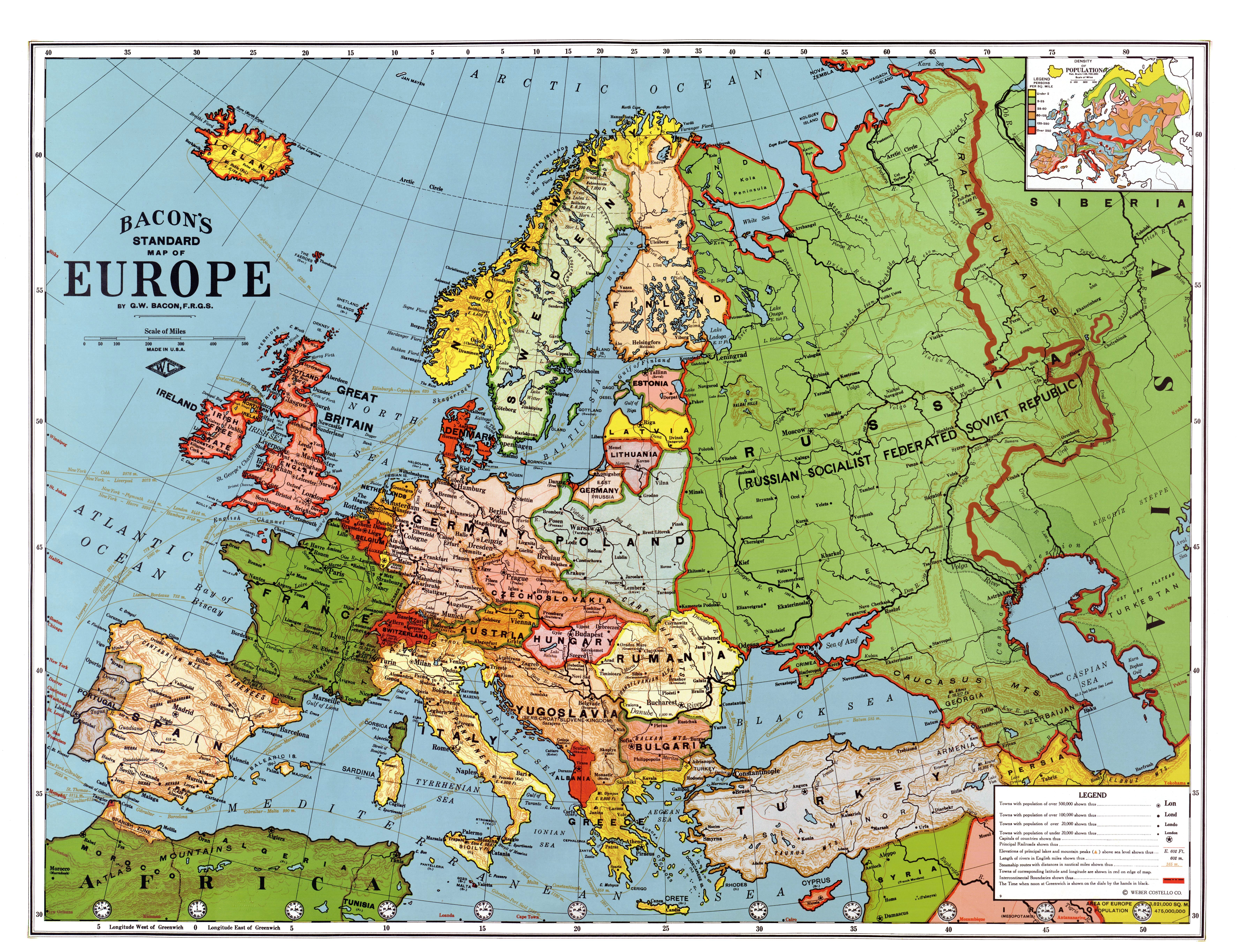
A map of Europe in 1923 after the Russian Civil War, among other revolutions.

Relations between Russia and the Central Powers did not go smoothly. The Ottoman Empire broke the treaty by invading the newly created First Republic of Armenia in May 1918. Joffe became the Russian ambassador to Germany. His priority was distributing propaganda to trigger the German revolution. On 4 November 1918, "the Soviet courier's packing-case had 'come to pieces'" in a Berlin railway station; it was filled with insurrectionary documents. Joffe and his staff were ejected from Germany in a sealed train on 5 November 1918. In the Armistice of 11 November 1918 that ended World War I, one clause abrogated the Brest-Litovsk treaty. Next, the Bolshevik legislature (VTsIK) annulled the treaty on 13 November 1918, and the text of the VTsIK Decision was printed in the newspaper Pravda the next day.

In the year after the armistice following a timetable set by the victors, the German Army withdrew its occupying forces from the lands gained in Brest-Litovsk. However, relations between Russia and the Allied Powers were also bad due to the Allied Powers' intervention in the Russian Civil War against the Soviet government of Russia and its allies. The fate of the region, and the location of the eventual western border of the Soviet Union, was settled in violent and chaotic struggles over the course of the next three and a half years. The Polish–Soviet War was particularly bitter; it ended with the Treaty of Riga in 1921. Although most of Ukraine and Belarus fell under Bolshevik control and eventually became two of the constituent republics of the Soviet Union, Poland and the Baltic states re-emerged as independent nations. In the Treaty of Rapallo, concluded in April 1922, Germany accepted the Treaty's nullification, and the two powers agreed to abandon all war-related territorial and financial claims against each other.

This state of affairs lasted until 1939, when after signing the secret protocol to the Nazi-Soviet pact, the Soviet Union was able to advance its borders westward by invading Poland in September 1939, by conquering parts of eastern Finland in the 1939–1940 Winter War, and by invading and occupying Estonia, Latvia, Lithuania, and parts of Romania (Bessarabia and northern Bukovina) in 1940. During World War II the Soviet leadership was thus able to overturn the majority of the territorial losses incurred at Brest-Litovsk, except for the larger part of Finland and western Congress Poland.

== See also ==
- 1918 Russia–Ukraine negotiations
- Armistice of Focșani
- Berlin Conference (December 6–7, 1917)
- History of Belarus
- Mitteleuropa
- Septemberprogramm
- Treaty of Brest-Litovsk (9 February 1918), signed by Ukraine
- Spa Conferences (First World War)
