= Fedor Linde =

Russian revolutionary (1881–1917)

- Friedrich Linde
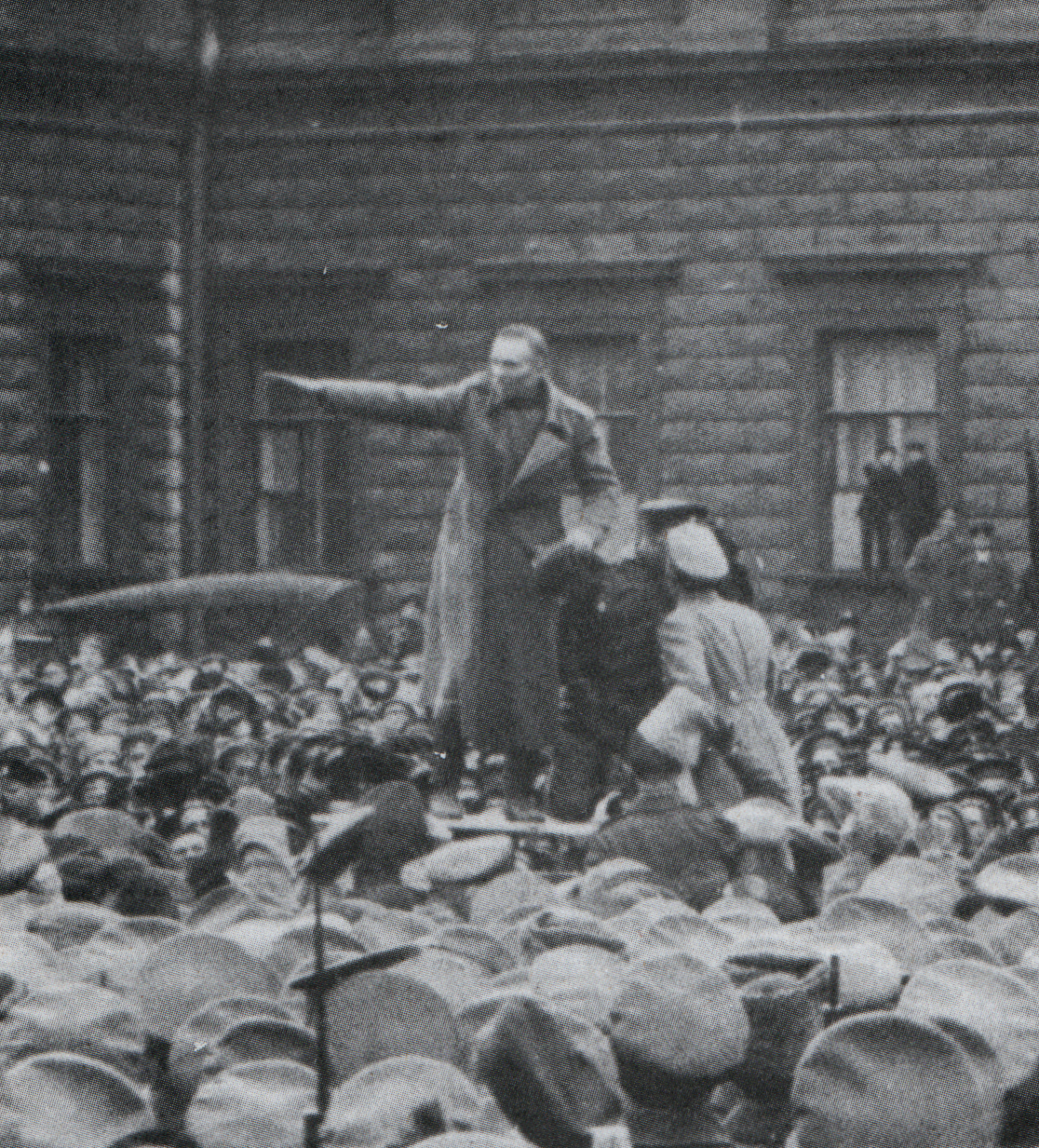
- Linde during the April Crisis of 1917
- Born: 9 February 1881
- Died: 21 August 1917 (aged 36); Lutsk
- Military career
- Allegiance: Russian Empire; Russian Republic
- Branch: Imperial Russian Army; Russian Army
- Unit: Finnish Life Guards Regiment
- Conflicts: World War I

Fedor Fedorovich Linde (Russian: Фёдор Линде; German: Friedrich Linde; 9 February 1881 – 21 August 1917) was a Russian revolutionary and political commissar. He played an "unsung but crucial role" in turning the tide of the February Revolution, in the words of historian Orlando Figes.

He was a sergeant in the Finland Regiment. For his role in leading a demonstration against Pavel Milyukov to demand his resignation, he was sent as a commissar to the Russian Army on the front by the Soviet. Here he became well known for convincing revolutionary units to continue fighting.

Linde was killed trying to convince a group of soldiers to return to combat near Lutsk in 1917, and was hailed as a "fallen fighter of the people's cause", receiving a hero's funeral.

== Biography ==
=== Early life ===
Fedor Linde was the son of a German chemist and a Polish peasant woman. His mother grew up in a small farm near St. Petersburg, and was an innkeeper; the inn was popular among the Russian revolutionaries of the capital when they tried to avoid the police. In socialising with the guests, the "tall, blonde and handsome", described as a "romantic idealist", became involved in the revolutionary underground.

He enrolled in the Mathematics Faculty of St. Petersburg University in 1899, and immediately became a leading figure in the student protest movement.

=== Political involvement ===
During the 1905 Revolution, Linde worked with the Social Democrats and joined the Bolsheviks the same year in St. Petersburg, organising the students into an "academic legion" to spread revolutionary propaganda to the working class. For this he was arrested and imprisoned in Kresty Prison, before he was forced to go into exile in Europe. Linde was allowed to return during the Romanov Tercentenary in 1913, as part of the political amnesties given. At the eruption of hostilities in 1914, Linde was mobilised by the Finland Regiment. He was soon promoted to rank of sergeant on the basis of his courageous leadership.

During the 1917 February Revolution, several army unit mutinies took place in Petrograd. In all of these mutinies, junior officers, mostly hailing from the lower-class or wielding democratic sympathies, played the "decisive role". Figes notes that Linde was "typical in this regard". In a letter written in the spring of 1917, to Socialist Revolutionary Boris Sokolov explained how he managed to convince the 5,000 soldiers of the Preobrazhensky Regiment to join the mutiny: Lying on the couch of the barracks of the Preobrazhensky Regiment near the Tauride Palace reading a book by Haldane, he was alerted to the events going on outside when a stray bullet shot through the window. Absorbed by the book, he did not notice the shooting and yelling in the streets, but now quickly noticed how Cossack troops were attacking unarmed citizens. When he saw a young girl try to evade a Cossack horse, the girl being too slow, and subsequently being struck down and landed under the horse's feet, her "penetrating inhuman scream" made something in him "snap". He now rallied his fellow soldiers standing on a table. Following him, not knowing to where or for what cause they followed him, they joined him in an attack on the police and Cossacks. Linde and his regiment killed some, with the rest retreating. He led a group of soldiers from the Preobrazhensky and Lithuanian Regiments, to the Finland Regiment to bring out his own soldiers.

Officers and soldiers like Linde provided what Figes calls "the first signs of real organisation" to the revolution. Linde with his men commanded a lorry, which bore a large banner reading "The First Revolutionary Flying Squad". During the Revolution, Linde took up command of the guard post at the gate of the Tauride Palace, having been elected by the Finland regiment to represent it in the Soviet council. Soldiers and officers like Linde were displayed with portraits in shop windows in the wake of the Revolution for their part in the events, but, according to Figes, have since "remained hidden from history books".

=== Milyukov note ===
An outraged Linde saw the Milyukov note as a betrayal to the February Revolution's promise to end the Great War and Tsarist autocracy. He led a battalion of the Finland Regiment in April in an armed demonstration to the Marinsky Palace, in the expectation that the Soviet would take over the Russian Provisional Government and establish Soviet power and demand the arrest of the government. By the time they had arrived at Marinsky, his regimental detachment had been accompanied by angry soldiers from Moscow and Pavlov regiments, swelling to 25,000 men.

Linde's "show of power" was improvised, but he was convinced that the Soviet Executive would approve of his actions in light of the April Theses. The Executive, however, passed a resolution in which they condemned Linde's actions, saying that the Soviet was not ready to assume power but should rather help the Provisional Government reassert its authority. Linde was denounced in the right-wing press as a "Bolshevik" in the wake of the events, depicting his demonstration as a bloody coup attempt – even though it had dissolved peacefully after having been ordered to do so by the Soviet.

=== Great War and death ===
As a punishment for his role in the demonstration against Milyukov, the Soviet sent Linde into "exile" as a commissar to the Special Army on the front, where his leadership skills were to be used for the coming offensive; he was satisfied with his new task. He became "something of a legend" for his trips to the most Bolshevized parts of the front, where he managed to convince them to continue to fight, and was something of a "model commissar".

At the time, it was generally believed that "Linde's own naive idealism" was "to blame for his brutal murder." On his arrival to the front, the commissar had been warned of the large danger that groups of deserters could pose. One of the bands of deserters, the 443rd, 444th of the 3rd Infantry Division, had been terrorising the area surrounding Lutsk, and it was believed that the 500 Cossacks brought by General Pyotr Krasnov should be employed to crack down on their camp. Linde, however, believed in the power of the "revolutionary word", insisting that the old ally of the Tsarist regime should not be deployed against the "freest army in the world". He insisted that he was going to make them listen to sense, emphasising it was "all a question of psychology". Unswayed by the others' arguments, he was allowed to attempt to convince the soldiers.

Linde approached the camp, consisting of approximately 5,000 deserters, alone, with a group of officers following him some distance behind, and with mounted Cossacks riding to surround the camp. The soldiers, seeing the Commissar approach, arose from the ground and prepared their rifles. Linde, noticing two groups (one large, and one small, compact), addressed the smaller one which he realised contained the most "Bolshevized" troops, on the basis of their hardened looks. He jumped onto a pile of logs and began calling on the soldiers to defend the "Fatherland", pointing in the direction of the sounds of the enemy artillery. Linde, noticing his words had no effect, began to harangue the soldiers, dubbing them "bastards" and "lazy swine", undeserving of freedom.

The agitated soldiers from the smaller Bolshevik group began heckling Linde, calling him a German spy. Krasnov, spectating from a distance, realised the severity of the situation and came in a car to rescue Linde. Linde however refused to leave. Only when the soldiers began moving towards him did he attempt to escape. Before he could escape however, he was struck down by a large soldier who struck the butt of his rifle into Linde's temple, with a second one "shooting him to the ground". A large crowd of soldiers "shrieking" threw themselves onto the incapacitated Linde, stabbing him with their bayonets. Krasnov and the others attempted to escape, but the soldiers gave chase, while the Cossack troops struggled to gain control. Colonel Konstantin Girshfeld was stripped naked and tortured before he was killed, and two other officers were also killed before the convoy managed to escape.

Linde's body was brought back to Petrograd and received a hero's funeral. The free, democratic press labelled him a "fallen fighter of the people's cause", and lauded him as a brilliant example of the "patriotic revolutionary" which the Russian army sorely needed.
