= The Dual Power =

Political article by Vladimir Lenin

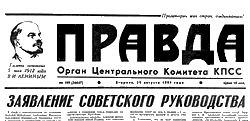
- Author: Vladimir Lenin
- Original title: Двоевластие
- Language: Russian
- Subject: The nature of State power after the February Revolution
- Genre: Political essay
- Publisher: Pravda
- Publication date: 9 April 1917
- Publication place: Russia
- Media type: Newspaper
- Pages: 4 (Note: From the Collected Works of Vladimir Lenin, vol. 24, pp. 38–41.)

"The Dual Power" (Russian: Двоевластие) is a short political article by Vladimir Lenin, published in the Bolshevik newspaper Pravda on 9 April 1917 (O.S.; 22 April N.S.) about Dual Power in Russia. Written within a week of Lenin's return to Petrograd from exile, the article discussed the system that emerged from the February Revolution, where the Russian Provisional Government and the Soviets of Workers' and Soldiers' Deputies each exercised part of the revolutionary state's authority after the fall of Tsar Nicholas II. It was published days after the April Theses was published and builds upon ideas contained in there.

== Background ==
The February Revolution (Note: Russian: Февральская буржуазно-демократическая революция) was the first of two revolutions in Russia in 1917. After Tsar Nicholas II abdicated the throne, the February Revolution led to the establishment of the Russian Provisional Government and its counterpart, the Petrograd Soviet. The Provisional Government was composed of former State Duma representatives; the Petrograd Soviet was made up of socialist leaders. With the Russian government transitioning from an autocracy to this system of "dual power" there was confusion about how both could coexist and govern together effectively.

== Pravda article ==
Lenin argues that the Soviets are not a group alongside the government, but a state power of a different type, one that traditional parliamentary politics does not describe. He states, "This power is of the same type as the Paris Commune of 1871." Writing on the Historical Materialism website, Peter D. Thomas notes that for Lenin the Soviets "represented a 'special type of state' that recalled ... the defining features of the Paris Commune". Lenin lays out three characteristics of their power:

- Its authority derives not from a law enacted by parliament, but from the direct initiative of the people from below. (Note: "the source of power is not a law previously discussed and enacted by parliament, but the direct initiative of the people from below, in their local areas".)
- Since the police and the army are institutions set against the people, they should be replaced by the arming of the whole people, with order maintained by the workers and peasants themselves. (Note: "the replacement of the police and the army, which are institutions divorced from the people and set against the people, by the direct arming of the whole people; order in the state under such a power is maintained by the armed workers and peasants themselves, by the armed people themselves.")
- The bureaucracy must be either replaced by the direct rule of the people or placed under their control, elected and subject to recall. (Note: "officialdom, the bureaucracy, are either similarly replaced by the direct rule of the people themselves or at least placed under special control; they not only become elected officials, but are also subject to recall at the people's first demand; they are reduced to the position of simple agents; from a privileged group holding "jobs" remunerated on a high, bourgeois scale, they become workers of a special "arm of the service", whose remuneration does not exceed the ordinary pay of a competent worker.")

The remedy he proposes is not a seizure of power by a minority but the patient winning of the working class to Bolshevik positions, and the article closes on the class alignment that in his view set the party's tasks. Lenin returned to the question a day later in "The Tasks of the Proletariat in Our Revolution", (Note: Written the following day, though not published until September, when it appeared as a pamphlet.) where he stated the conclusion in its hardest form: "Two powers cannot exist in a state. One of them is bound to pass away."

Leon Trotsky discusses dual power in a chapter in The History of the Russian Revolution, where he states, "a two-power régime arises only out of irreconcilable class conflicts – it is possible, therefore, only in a revolutionary epoch".

== See also ==
- April Theses
- Petrograd Soviet Order No. 1
- April Crisis
- The State and Revolution
