= Friedrich Linde =

Friedrich Linde may refer to:

- Fedor Linde, Russian revolutionary
- Friedrich Linde, general manager or general director of Linde plc in 1935
- Friedrich Linde, 19th century German composer
