= The State and Revolution =

1917 book by Vladimir Lenin

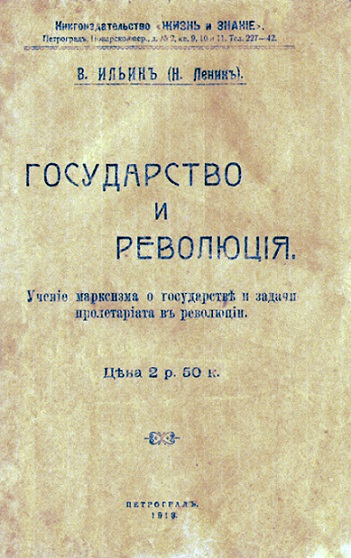
- Cover of a Russian first edition
- Author: Vladimir Lenin
- Original title: Государство и революция
- Language: Russian
- Genre: Politics
- Publication date: 1918
- Publication place: Russian Republic
- Media type: Print

The State and Revolution: The Marxist Theory of the State and the Tasks of the Proletariat in the Revolution (Russian: Государство и революция. Учение марксизма о государстве и задачи пролетариата в революции, romanized: Gosudarstvo i revolyutsiya. Ucheniye marksizma o gosudarstve i zadachi proletariata v revolyutsii) is a book written by Vladimir Lenin and published in 1918 which describes his views on the role of the state in society, the necessity of proletarian revolution, and the theoretical inadequacies of social democracy in achieving revolution to establish the dictatorship of the proletariat.

== Background ==
Lenin began the composition of an early draft of The State and Revolution while in exile in Switzerland in 1916, under the title "Marxism on the State".

"Soviets", legislative bodies of workers and peasants, were the de facto governments of Petrograd and many smaller cities. The Russian public was deeply upset with the continuation of Russia's involvement in World War I and the continued economic difficulties that it brought on. On November 7, the Congress of Soviets officially elected a coalition of Bolsheviks, Socialist Revolutionaries and Mensheviks to govern. Through the Red Guards, paramilitary organizations of revolutionary workers, sailors, and soldiers, the Soviet government was able to storm the Winter Palace and officially abolish the Provisional Government. The revolution was not uniformly accepted among all Russians; resistance and disruption would occur routinely leading up to the Russian Civil War. A particular issue that Lenin covers in The State and Revolution was the right of nations to secession ("the right to self-determination"); during the composition of this book, the Mensheviks of Georgia declared independence soon after the Revolution, forming the Democratic Republic of Georgia.

By November 25, the 1917 Constitutional Assembly was elected with a majority of positions going to the Socialist Revolutionary Party, which had made a right-ward turn after the revolution with most of the Left-SRs joining the Bolshevik party. In one of the most controversial actions of the early Soviet government, the constitutional convention was dissolved on January 20, 1918.

== Synopsis ==
The State and Revolution is considered to be Lenin's most important work on the state and has been called by Lucio Colletti "Lenin's greatest contribution to political theory". According to the Marxologist David McLellan, "the book had its origin in Lenin's argument with Bukharin in the summer of 1916 over the existence of the state after a proletarian revolution. Bukharin had emphasised the 'withering' aspect, whereas Lenin insisted on the necessity of the state machinery to expropriate the expropriators. In fact, it was Lenin who changed his mind, and many of the ideas of State and Revolution, composed in the summer of 1917 – particularly the anti-statist theme – were those of Bukharin".

Lenin's direct and simple definition of the State is that "the State is a special organisation of force: it is an organisation of violence for the suppression of some Social class." Hence his denigration even of parliamentary democracy, which was influenced by what Lenin saw as the recent increase of bureaucratic and military influences:

To decide once every few years which member of the ruling class is to repress and crush the people through parliament – this is the real essence of bourgeois parliamentarism, not only in parliamentary-constitutional monarchies, but also in the most democratic republics.

— Vladimir Lenin, The State and the Revolution

Citing Friedrich Engels and Karl Marx, Lenin investigates theoretical questions about the existence of the State after the proletarian revolution, addressing the arguments of anti-authoritarians, anarchists, social democrats, and reformists, in describing the progressive stages of societal change—the revolution, establishing “the lower stage of communist society” (the socialist commune), and the “higher stage of communist society” that will yield a stable society where personal freedom might be fully expressed.

Lenin especially defends Marx's theory of communism, and Marxism generally; to wit, when old revolutionaries die, the bourgeoisie are not content with labelling them “enemies of the state”, because that would attract political radicals, so they attack the revolutionaries’ theoretic writings by ascribing to them an (anti-revolutionary) social-democratic mediocrity contrary to “the revolutionary nature of Marx”; such bourgeois intellectuals are the “revisionists” who transform a human being into an abstraction:

During the lifetime of great revolutionaries, the oppressing classes constantly hounded them, received their theories with the most savage malice, the most furious hatred, and the most unscrupulous campaigns of lies and slander. After their deaths, attempts are made to convert them into harmless icons, to canonize them, so to say, and to hallow their names, to a certain extent, for the ‘consolation’ of the oppressed classes, and with the object of duping the latter, while, at the same time, robbing the revolutionary theory of its substance, blunting its revolutionary edge, and vulgarizing it. Today, the bourgeoisie and the opportunists within the labour movement concur in this doctoring of Marxism. They omit, obscure, or distort the revolutionary side of this theory, its revolutionary soul. They push to the foreground and extol what is, or seems, acceptable to the bourgeoisie. All the social-chauvinists are now ‘Marxists’ (don’t laugh!). And more and more frequently, German bourgeois scholars, only yesterday specialists in the annihilation of Marxism, are speaking of the ‘national-German’ Marx, who, they claim, educated the labour unions, which are so splendidly organised for the purpose of waging a predatory war!

The State and Revolution describes the inherent nature of the State as a tool for class oppression, the creation of a social class's desire to control the other social classes when politico-economic disputes cannot otherwise be peacefully resolved; whether a dictatorship or a democracy, the State remains the social-control means of the ruling class. Even in a democratic capitalist republic, the ruling class never relinquish political power, maintaining it via the “behind-the-scenes” control of universal suffrage—an excellent deception that maintains the idealistic concepts of “freedom and democracy”; hence, communist revolution is the sole remedy for such demagogy:

1. The anarchists propose the State's immediate abolishment; Lenin counter-proposes that such idealism is pragmatically impossible, because the proletariat would need to crush the bourgeois resistance through a mechanism, and that is the state.
2. Where the State immediately abolished, without the “conditions leading to the arising of the State” being abolished as well, a new State would appear, and the socialist revolution would have been in vain.

In the event, the proletariat through the dictatorship of the proletariat would establish a communal State (per the 1871 Paris Commune model), then gradually suppress the dissenting bourgeoisie, in achieving the withering away of the State as its institutions begin to “lose their political character”.

Thus, following Marx's conclusions on the Paris Commune, which Lenin took as his model. Lenin declared that the task of the Revolution was to smash the State. Although for a period under communism, "there remains for a time not only bourgeois right but even the bourgeois State without the bourgeoisie," Lenin believed that after a successful proletarian revolution the state had not only begun to wither, but was in an advanced condition of decomposition. But Lenin also called the state "the armed and ruling proletariat" so McLellan asks whether this, too withers? Yes, according to McLellan, "in so far as it was in any way a power separate from and opposed to, the masses" Lenin had little to say of the institutional form of this transition period. There was a strong emphasis on the dictatorship of the proletariat: "A Marxist is solely someone who extends the recognition of the class struggle to the recognition of the dictatorship of the proletariat. This is what constitutes the most profound distinction between the Marxist and the ordinary petty (as well as big) bourgeois. This is the touchstone on which the real understanding and recognition of Marxism is to be tested."

== Editions in English ==
- Lenin, Vladimir. State and Revolution. Aziloth Books, London. 2017. ISBN 978-1614271925
- ibid, ed. Robert Service, State and Revolution. Penguin Books, London. 1992. ISBN 978-0140184358
- ed. Christman, Henry M. Essential Works of Lenin: What is to be Done and other Writings. Bantam Books, New York, 1966. ISBN 9780486253336.
- Tucker, Robert C, ed. (1975). The Lenin Anthology. Norton. ISBN 978-0-393-09236-3. OCLC 643594933.

== See also ==
- Vladimir Lenin bibliography
- Who, whom?
- The Dual Power

== Sources ==
- McLellan, David (1979). Marxism after Marx: an introduction. Macmillan. ISBN 978-0-333-18155-3.
