= Berlin Conference (December 6–7, 1917) =

Strategy meeting during World War I

Berlin Conference (December 6 and 7, 1917)
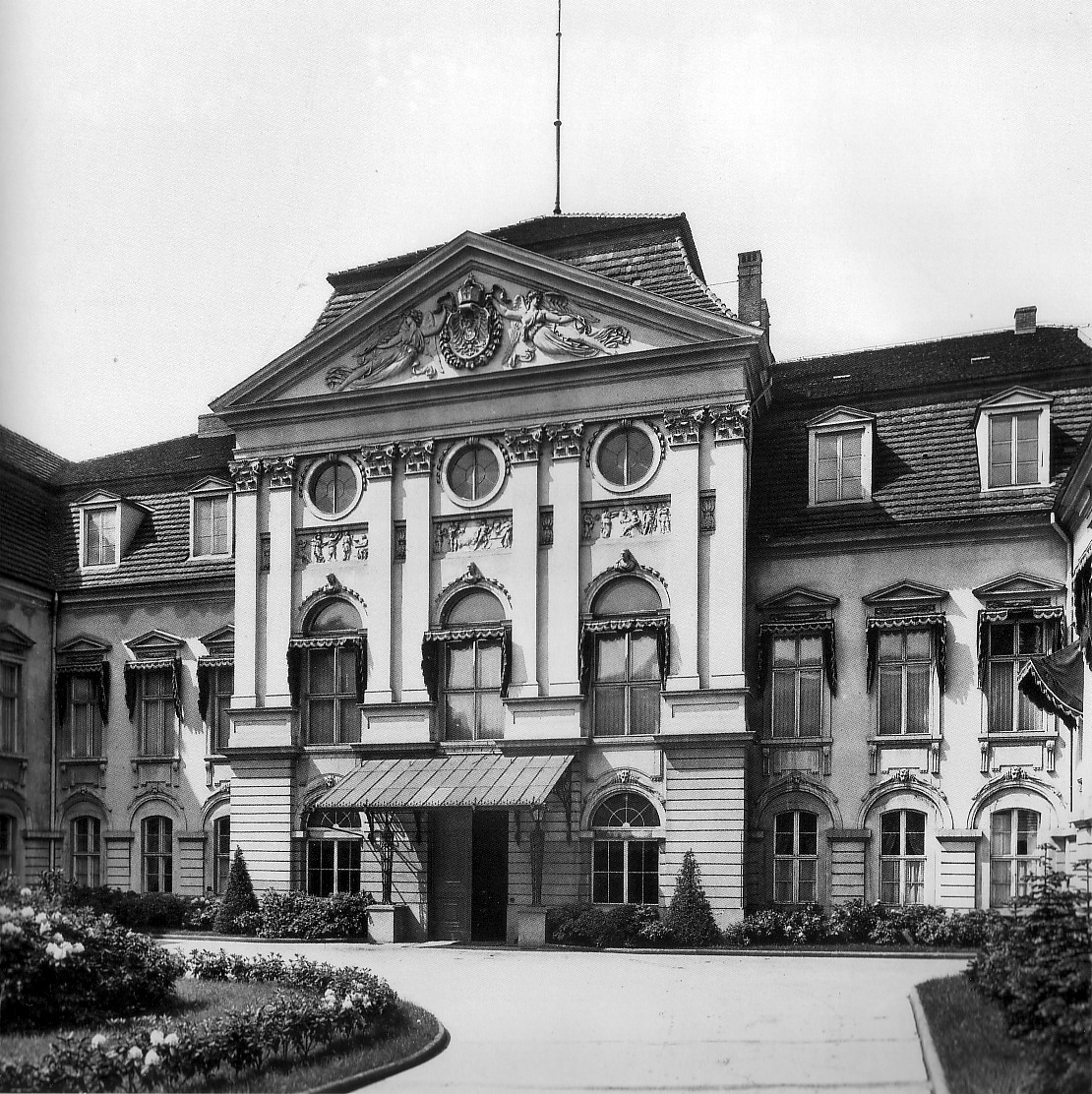
- The chancellery of the Reich en 1910.
- Genre: Strategy meeting
- Dates: December 6 and 7, 1917
- Location: Berlin
- Country: German Empire
- Participants: Wilhelm II; Georg von Hertling; Richard von Kühlmann; Paul von Hindenburg; Erich Ludendorff; Max Hoffmann

The Berlin Conference held on December 6 and 7, 1917 was a council of the German Imperial Crown summoned to the Imperial Chancellery by Emperor Wilhelm II to ratify the conditions on which the members of the Quadruple Alliance, or Central Powers would be prepared to accept an armistice with the Council of People's Commissars in power in Russia after the October Revolution.

The conference, which brought together civilians and soldiers, was also a new opportunity for confrontation between members of the civilian government and the military, who were opposed over the nature of the peace to be imposed on a defeated Russia. The former wanted to impose moderate conditions, while the latter favored a peace that would reflect the reality of the military balance on the Eastern Front, which favored the Central Powers. This opposition also forms around the question of control over the abandoned Russian territories.

== Context ==
=== Situation in Russia ===
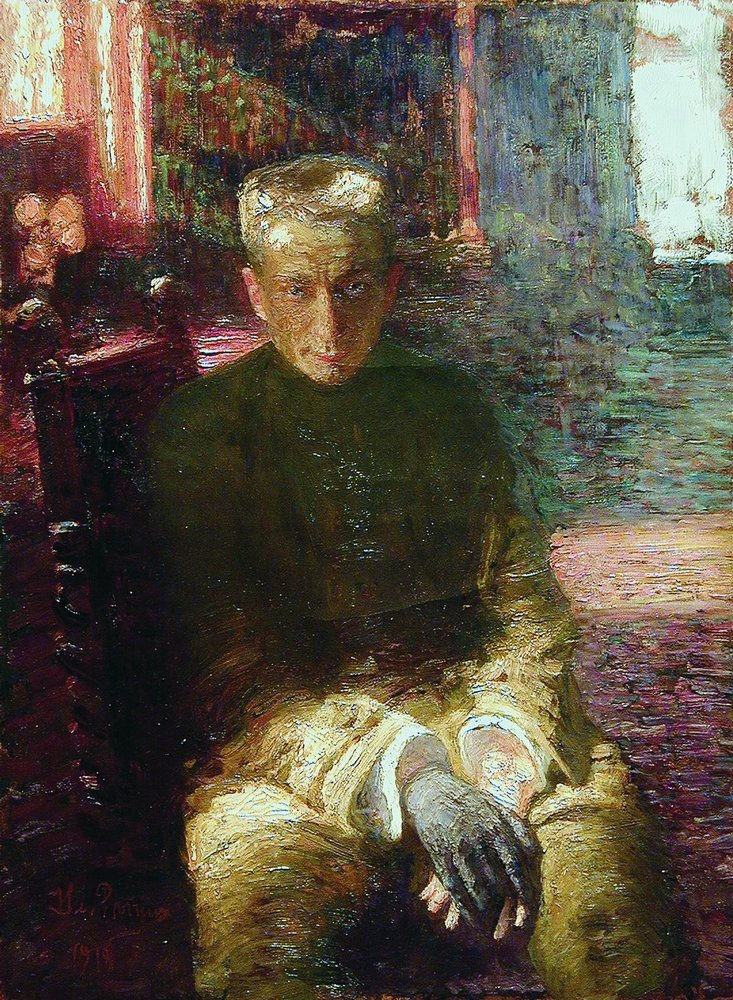
Alexander Kerensky, portrayed here by Ilya Repin, launched a final Russian offensive on the Eastern Front on July 1, 1917.

Since the February Revolution, the Reich has been seeking to destabilize the Russian provisional government that succeeded Nicholas II, while the Russian army has been crumbling and rapidly losing its operational capacity.

Russia's new government soon came out in favor of continuing Russian involvement in the conflict, disappointing the wishes of the majority of the population. This policy also disappointed the Germans, who had expected the provisional government to request a suspension of operations. Thus, in April, the German government allowed exiled left-wing socialists (Bolsheviks), including Lenin and his relatives, to cross Germany by train to Russia to create a structured pacifist movement, in a context marked by the Russian population's weariness with the prolonged conflict.

In parallel with this agitation, the Russian army carried out a final offensive in Austro-Hungarian Galicia, which after some initial successes, gave the signal for the dissolution of the Russian army in July 1917, depriving the provisional government of any capacity to wage war effectively against the Central Powers.

On November 6 and 7, 1917, the Bolsheviks staged a successful coup d'état in Petrograd, installing a government that remained in precarious conditions. It was not until early December 1917 that Lenin and his government managed to stabilize their power, not only in the capital but also in Moscow: the efforts of Kerensky, the most dangerous of their rivals at the time, to restore his authority ended in failure, as the army did not intervene.

=== Peace is near ===
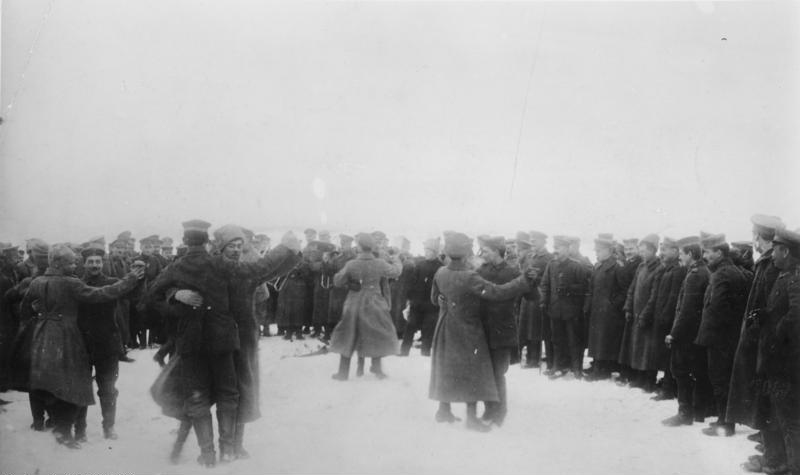
Fraternization between German and Russian soldiers was initially encouraged by the German command.

Since March, the German imperial government held a series of talks, both internally and with its quadruplicate allies, to define a program of war aims, despite the fact that the central powers had lost the strategic initiative in the previous year. (Note: In the battles of the Somme, of Gorizia, and on the Brusiluv offensive, the Central Powers suffered losses that were impossible to replace, both in men and equipment.)

In Russia, the February Revolution raised hopes of the end of operations on the Eastern Front, but these hopes were quickly dashed by the declarations of the members of the provisional government, who supported the continuation of the war. On November 21, 1917, however, when the Bolsheviks had secured their power in Petrograd, Lenin requested the opening of peace negotiations, which were immediately refused by the Allies; this proposal was accepted on the advice of Max Hoffmann, Erich Ludendorff's Chief of Staff, and under pressure from Ottokar Czernin, the Austro-Hungarian Foreign Minister.

As soon as the acceptance of the Russian proposal was announced on December 2, 1917, Nikolai Krylenko, chief of staff of the Russian army appointed by the Council of People's Commissars, announced to the Russian troops the end of hostilities with the Central Powers, calling into question the operational capabilities of the Russian army: Russian soldiers, thinking that peace had been signed, fraternized with Austro-German troops; these fraternizations were initially encouraged by the OHL, the German High Command, despite the reservations of the Ober Ost, in charge of operations on the Eastern Front, and the AOK, the Austro-Hungarian Supreme Command.

== Participants ==
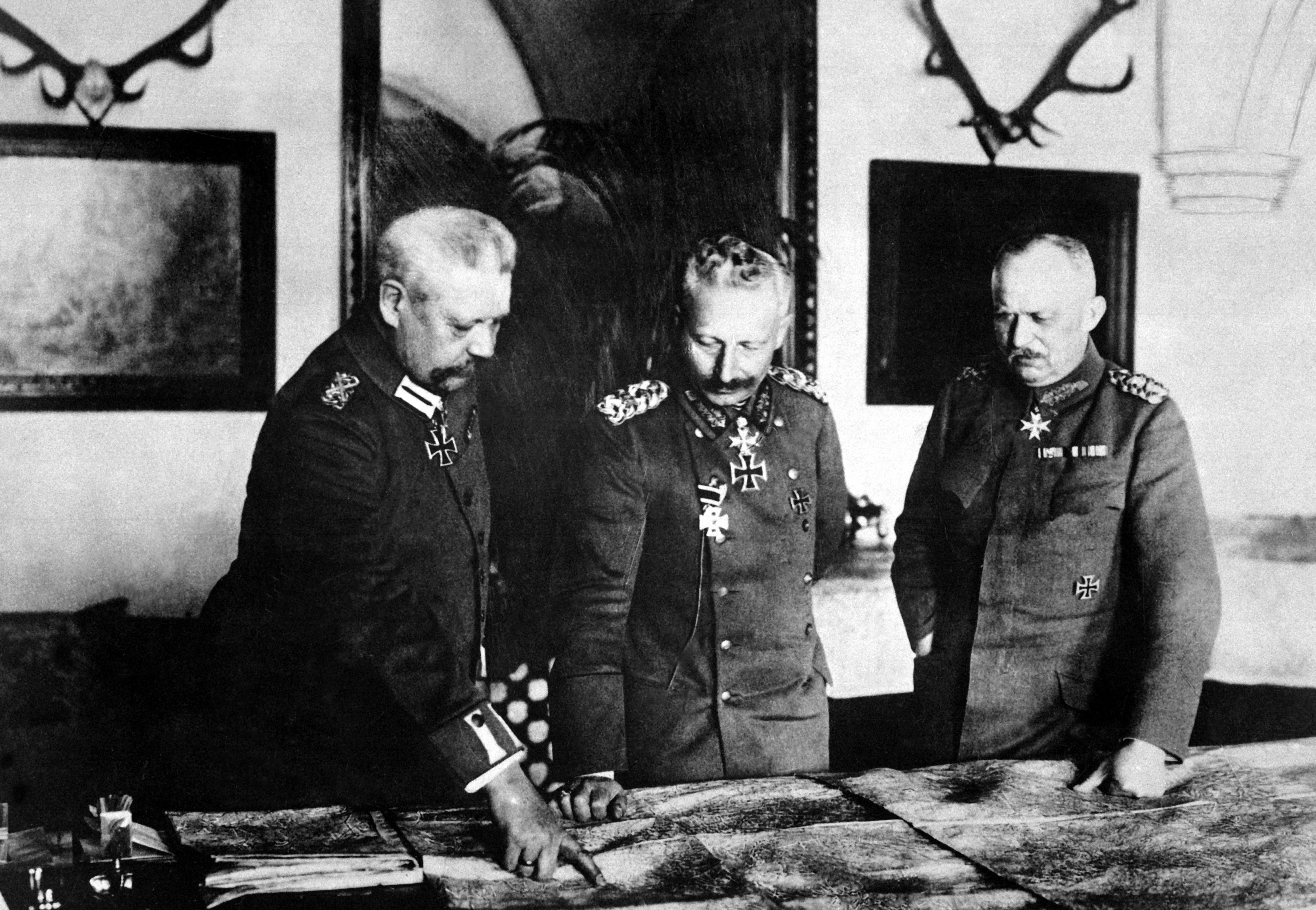
Paul von Hindenburg, Wilhelm II and Erich Ludendorff on January 8, 1917

The conference, held in the Imperial Chancellery and chaired by Emperor Wilhelm II, brought together representatives of the High Command with members of the Imperial Cabinet.

The Dioscuri, Paul von Hindenburg and Erich Ludendorff, accompanied by their Chief of Staff and principal advisor, Max Hoffmann, the "unavoidable man from the East," (Note: Max Hoffmann held various functions in the staffs of the armies deployed on the Eastern Front, then in the Ober Ost from August 17, 1914.) attended this Crown Council on behalf of the German High Command.

The Imperial Chancellor, Georg von Hertling, together with Richard von Kühlmann, the State Secretary for Foreign Affairs, represented the civil government. Despite the pre-eminence of his position, the Chancellor, a tired old man, (Note: Historians Fritz Fischer and Jean-Yves Le Naour portray him as an indolent old man, with little concern for the tasks imposed on him.) who was disliked by the Lutheran elite because he was a Catholic, delegated the details of the exchange with the military to his minister: relations between the Ministry and the OHL were abominable.

== Discussions ==
=== German hesitations ===
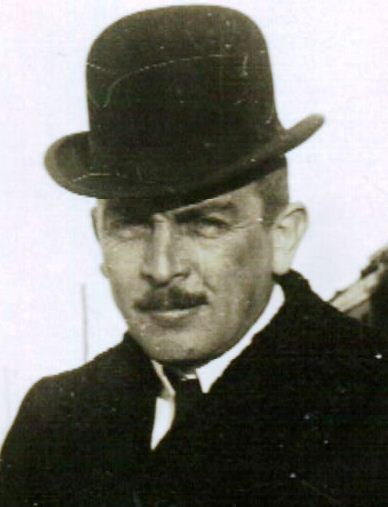
Richard von Kühlmann doubted the strength of the government established after the October Revolution.

The Bolshevik government's request gave rise to some reservations on the part of the Quadruple Alliance.

Richard von Kühlmann was the most cautious about the Russian proposals. He was well aware of the precariousness of the new power in Petrograd, which had been in place for two weeks and did not control Russian territory.

The revolutionary program of Lenin and his government seemed to frighten some German and Austro-Hungarian officials; indeed, Lenin's pacifist proclamations raised fears of contagion within the Central Powers. The program of "peace without annexations or indemnities", which found echoes in the opposition in the Reichstag, repelled the German government and military, who were all in favor of strengthening German power in Europe and Africa. What's more, this program exacerbated tensions between civilians and the military, with civilians calling for the establishment of independent states linked to Germany by long-term agreements, and the military for the annexation of the Baltic and Polish regions of the former Russian Empire to the Reich or to Prussia. (Note: On July 31, 1917, the differences between civilian and military opinion on the question of the Reich's war goals were revealed during the Bingen Conference.)

=== Proposed policies ===
Some of the participants, especially members of the civilian government, favored opening negotiations with the new authorities in Petrograd, while the military wanted to resume hostilities, which had in fact been suspended for a month, and "restore order" in Russia in Ludendorff's words.

The civilians wanted the Eastern Front closed and long-term access to Russia's agricultural and mineral wealth, enabling the establishment of a continental bloc in Eastern Europe, supported by independent states detached from Russia and linked to the Reich by long-term political, technical and economic agreements; they also wanted to remain out of Russian political life. To firmly tie Russia to the Reich, trade clauses were also considered: the Russian government had to agree to a return to the customs rate in effect in 1914.

The civilians' program was bound to clash with the military, who were still in favor of annexations in the Baltic states and the military occupation of vast portions of Russian territory, including the seat of government, reduced to the role of extra and guarantor of Russia's proper administration. To legalize this military occupation, the military contemplated specific clauses in the peace treaty between Russia and the Central Powers, the reorganization of its army along Prussian lines and the permanent occupation of certain Russian cities or regions. Customs and trade clauses were also considered. The Russian government was required to adopt German trade standards, and to draw up regulations for rail traffic and rivers and canals based on the model in place in the Reich.

== Decisions ==
=== Armistice ===
A study of the situation on the Russian front led those present to take a positive view of the overtures of the Russian government.

The precarious nature of Lenin's government did not prevent those present from considering the opening of armistice negotiations, despite the differences within the Reich government over the policy to be adopted in Russia.

The conference participants agreed on moderate armistice conditions, limited to a suspension of arms and an armistice line defined by the front line. They accepted the Bolsheviks' request to legalize fraternization between soldiers. However, a consensus was reached to limit its impact and scope: such meetings between German and Russian soldiers could only take place in specific locations, and exchanges of letters remained subject to postal control. (Note: The military command therefore hoped to limit the impact of the pacifist propaganda that the Bolsheviks thought they could spread among the German units deployed on the Eastern Front.)

=== The Reich confronts the new Russian power ===
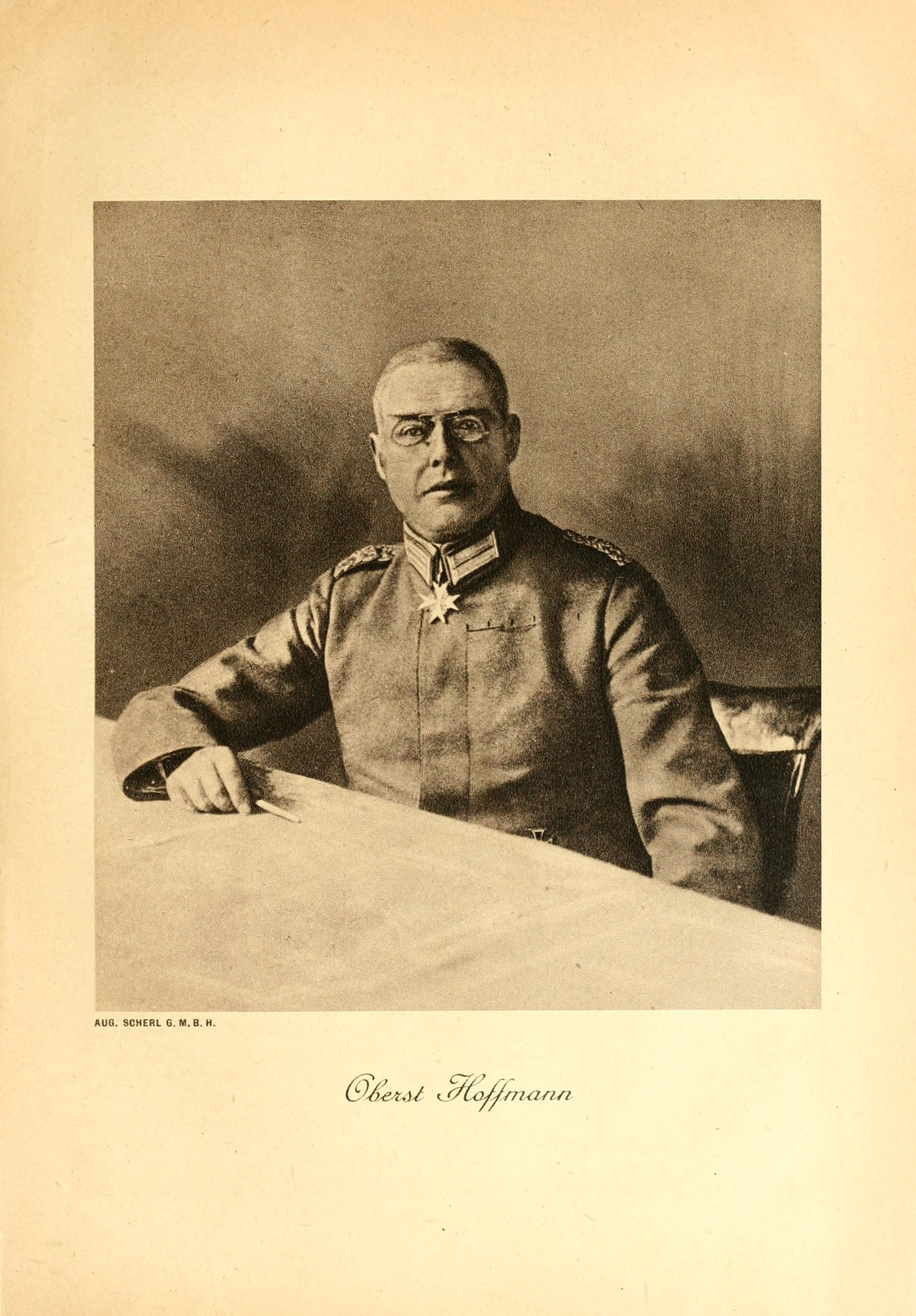
Max Hoffmann opposed the conclusion of a peace that might be too harsh for Russia.

As the main players in Lenin's return to Russia, German leaders welcomed the new Russian government's requests to open negotiations.

Richard von Kühlmann, however, made no mistake about the solidity of the Petrograd government's power; despite the military's reluctance, he obtained de facto recognition of Lenin's government and the opening of peace negotiations. In the Secretary of State's view, no power that could impose itself through a possible overthrow of the Bolsheviks would be able to impose a resumption of hostilities against the Central Powers.

The Reich government did not wish to formally recognize the Council of People's Commissars as the legal government of the Russian Republic, but Richard von Kühlmann succeeded in getting the Kaiser to agree to a two-stage recognition of Lenin's government. In the first stage, the opening of negotiations was to lead to de facto recognition of its existence, then in the second stage, the signing of the peace treaty with the Central Powers would lead to the full recognition of the new government. This two-stage solution was the result of a compromise between Max Hoffmann and Richard von Kühlmann, who were both in favor of rapidly concluding peace with Russia, while the Dioscuri wished to realize the ambitious program of war objectives defined during the month of October. (Note: In Kreuznach, and then in Vienna Conferences, first German and then German-Austro-Hungarian, had defined an ambitious program of war aims on October 7 and 22.)

=== Preparing peace with Russia ===
This conference also represented the second opportunity to consider the peace terms that the Reich wished to impose on the Russian government.

While all participants agreed to remove Poland and the Baltic states from Russia, they remained divided over the nature of German control over these territories. The Russian demand for a cessation of hostilities did not put an end to the quarrels between civilians and the military: the civilians wanted to set up states linked to the Reich by long-term political, economic and military agreements, calling into question their real independence, while the military wanted extensive annexations in the Baltic states and Poland.

Civilians and the military also disagreed over the delineation of Russia's western borders, from the Baltic to the Black Sea, with the civilians calling for remote control of these territories. In particular, through a return to the clauses of the German-Russian trade treaty in force before the outbreak of the conflict. Meanwhile, the military favored evicting Russia from the Baltic states, Poland, Ukraine and the Caucasus.

== See also ==
- Oberste Heeresleitung
- Wilhelm II
- Armistice between Russia and the Central Powers
- Operation Faustschlag
- Treaty of Brest-Litovsk
- Treaty of Berlin (August 27, 1918)
- Peace efforts during the First World War
