= Dual power =

Political theory

Dual power, sometimes referred to as counterpower, refers to a strategy in which alternative institutions coexist with and seek to ultimately replace existing authority.

The term was first used by the communist Bolshevik leader Vladimir Lenin (1870–1924) in the 1917 Pravda article titled "The Dual Power" (Двоевластие, Dvoyevlastiye), referring to the coexistence of two Russian governments as a result of the February Revolution: the Soviets (workers' councils), particularly the Petrograd Soviet, and the Russian Provisional Government. Lenin saw this unstable power dynamic as an opportunity for revolutionaries to seize control.

This notion has informed the strategies of subsequent communist-led revolutions elsewhere in the world, including the Chinese Communist Revolution led by Mao Zedong (1893–1976) after the Chinese Civil War (1927–1949) and in eastern Europe after World War II (1939–1945).

While the term was initially associated with Bolshevik strategy, its meaning has since expanded among anarchists, municipalists, and other libertarian socialists, where it describes the creation of directly democratic structures such as worker cooperatives, people’s assemblies, and mutual aid networks that challenge state and capitalist power while prefiguring a self-managed society.

== Background ==
After Tsar Nicholas II abdicated the throne, the resulting February Revolution led to the establishment of the Provisional Government and its counterpart, the Petrograd Soviet. The Provisional Government was composed of former State Duma representatives with approval from the Petrograd Soviet, whereas the Petrograd Soviet was made up of socialist leaders elected by a proletariat constituency. With the Russian government moving from an autocracy to this system of "dual power" with the Provisional Government and Petrograd Soviet constantly vying for power, there was much confusion on how both could coexist and govern effectively.

In this confusion, the Provisional Government realized the Soviet had the people's trust and enthusiasm. In the hopes of appeasing the Soviet and keeping the support of the population, the Provisional Government launched several very bold liberal acts and promoted civil liberties through means of freedom of speech, press, and assembly. Yet, other than strategic political motives, the Provisional Government understood that their power was illegitimate, due to the fact that they were not elected by the people. To solve the problem of illegitimacy, the Provisional Government was in the process of establishing the Constituent Assembly, whose members would be democratically elected by the people. The Constituent Assembly would never come to be under the Provisional Government's rule, as the elections were set after the Bolsheviks seized power in the October Revolution.

After the February Revolution, Lenin published his April Theses and in it he expressed unhappiness with the February Revolution as he described it as a "Bourgeois Revolution". He pushed for the slogan "All Power to the Soviets". Lenin mentioned that a Proletarian Revolution was necessary, and expressed that he had no interest in cooperating with the Provisional Government or the other Soviet leaders who were willing to compromise. Other members of Soviet leadership were skeptical of Lenin's ideas since they were afraid that Lenin and the Bolsheviks were advocating for anarchism. Lenin also criticized the Petrograd Soviet for governing alongside the Provisional Government, and accused them of forgetting and abandoning socialist ideas and the proletarian revolution.

== Provisional Government ==
The Provisional Government's members primarily consisted of former State Duma members under Nicholas II's reign. Its members were mainly members of the liberal Constitutional Democratic Party and conservative Octobrist party, but also included one Progressivist and one Trudovik. The ideological and political ideas differed wildly throughout the party's leadership and members, but most were moderates, offering both liberal and conservative views at times. The Kadets and the Provisional Government alike pushed for new policies including the release of political prisoners, a decree of freedom of press, cessation of the Okhrana, abolition of the death penalty, and rights for minorities. The Provisional Government and the Kadets also wanted Russia to continue to be involved in World War I, much to the dismay of the Soviets. Despite certain political ideas, the Kadets became slightly more conservative overall with the rise of left-wing parties and left-wing thought within both the Provisional Government and the Petrograd Soviet. The Provisional Government realized that their power was not legitimate since they were former Duma members, and not elected by a general public. They knew that to be seen as a legitimate government body, they would need to be elected by the people, and they established the Constituent Assembly and scheduled popular elections to take place later in the year.

Alexander Kerensky, a former member of the Fourth Duma and a chairman of the Soviet Executive Committee and eventually the Prime Minister for the Provisional Government, was brought into the Provisional Government as a way to gain support from left-wing parties and the Petrograd Soviet. Kerensky was a moderate socialist, and believed that cooperation with the Provisional Government was necessary. Historian S. A. Smith explains that after the appointment of Kerensky "Thus was born 'dual power', an institutional arrangement under which the Provisional Government enjoyed formal authority, but where the Soviet Executive Committee had real power." The Provisional Government feared the Soviets immense growing power, and through this fear they tried to appease them as much as possible. When Kerensky became Prime Minister, he attempted to work with the Soviets including arming the Soviets and their followers during the Kornilov affair.

== Petrograd Soviet ==
The Soviet of Workers' and Soldiers' Deputies in Petrograd served as the voice of the smaller councils of deputies elected by commoners, specifically soldiers and workers. The Petrograd Soviet, therefore, could claim a much better understanding of the people's will, since it was composed of many orators whom the lower class population elected. The Soviet was established after the February Revolution, composed of numerous socialist revolutionaries.

The workers and soldiers of Russia saw hope in the Petrograd soviets, and elected deputies to it en masse, causing it to gain membership at an alarming rate (1,200 seats had been filled in a week). The Petrograd Soviet was seen as a benefactor that would bring them land, bread, and peace.

The executive committee was initially made up of Nikolai Ckheidze, Matvei Skobelev, and Alexander Kerensky. To keep radical mentality from spreading and provoking a "counter-revolutionary movement", they supported the Provisional Government where necessary.

== July Days' impact ==
The events of the July Days would solidify the issues of dual power within government between the Provisional Government and Petrograd Soviet. Between 3 and 7 July (Julian Calendar date), a Bolshevik uprising, still disputed whether intentional by Lenin, occurred. In what is seen as a "grassroots" uprising, workers and lower ranks of soldiers violently demonstrated in the streets, calling for the Soviet to take power over the Provisional Government. The uprising was supported by the Bolshevik Military Organization and Petersburg Committee, who sent in more support, but the leaders of the party had less concrete opinions about the demonstration.

Alexander Kerensky, head of the Provisional Government, led a crackdown on those involved with the events of the July Days and overthrow of the Provisional Government. The military was used to gather and arrest violent demonstrators, retake government buildings from Bolshevik forces, and dissolve military units that had participated in the attempted overthrow. The Provisional Government also attempted to undermine Lenin and his party by revealing their investigation of his ties to Germany, Russia's enemy during World War I. These combined actions would quell the Bolshevik uprising and support until August 1917 (Julian).

The reinstatement of the death penalty for soldiers, and Kerensky transferring the Provisional Government into the Winter Palace were among the actions that led to accusations of counterrevolutionary activity (reestablishment of autocratic government) by the Provisional Government. A new kind of duality between the classes (proletariat and bourgeoisie) was a split noticeable not only in government, but also in everyday life for Russians. This led to increased tensions between both theaters, and made it difficult for groups to collaborate. The Petrograd Soviet represented the Proletariat, while the Provisional Government members were part of the former State Duma, representing the old government under the tsar. This divide was also evident in the military, between rank-and-file soldiers and military officers. As World War I continued on, soldiers started to mutiny or to disobey orders from their superiors, while supporting the soviets, hoping to bring an end to Russia's involvement in the war.

== October Revolution ==
My answer is: (1) it should be overthrown, for it is an oligarchic, bourgeois, and not a people’s government, and is unable to provide peace, bread, or full freedom; (2) It cannot be overthrown just now, for it is being kept in power by a direct and indirect, a formal and actual agreement with the Soviets of Workers’ Deputies, and primarily with the chief Soviet, the Petrograd Soviet; (3) generally, it can not be “overthrown” in the ordinary way, for it rests on the “support ” given to the bourgeoisie by the second government—the Soviet of Workers’ Deputies, and that government is the only possible revolutionary government, which directly expresses the mind and will of the majority of the workers and peasants.

— Lenin's answer to "Should the Provisional Government be overthrown immediately?" in The Dual Power (April 1917)

Although the Bolshevik party was largely put down after the events of the July Days, Lenin still believed that the group could gain power in government because of unsteadiness due to the dual power situation. In April he wrote that the time was not yet right for revolution, as the Petrograd Soviet was still involved and working with the Provisional Government, as well as stating, "we do not as yet know a type of government superior to and better than the Soviets." With the July Days seen as "Lenin's worst blunder", even though it was not necessarily his intention, the Bolsheviks were still not in place to take over the Provisional Government and Petrograd Soviet.

However, with the Kornilov affair of August 1917 (Julian-style date), the Bolsheviks regained both power in their party, but also with the masses. With Kornilov's soldiers moving towards the capital and the Provisional Government, Kerensky had released many Bolshevik leaders arrested during the July Days and also provided arms in order for the Bolsheviks to defend the Provisional Government. By arming and calling on those who he had earlier punished, the Bolsheviks saw that they truly were gaining power in the government and Russian society. The Russian population lost faith in the Provisional Government because of how it handled Kornilov's coup, and many began supporting the Bolsheviks, with the group winning elections throughout Petrograd, especially in districts made up of the working class. This event, coupled with food shortages, the continuation of Russian involvement in World War I, and mass unemployment, worked in the Bolsheviks favor, turning people away from the government in charge and toward the party that promised "Bread, Peace, Land."

When the Bolsheviks overthrew the Provisional Government during the October Revolution, they were able to do so with little resistance. The Provisional Government realized that their power was limited at the point of takeover, as the Bolsheviks had been gaining supporters and had more revolutionaries. When the actual overthrow occurred between the days of October 25 and 26 (Julian), Bolsheviks first seized means of transportation and communication, such as roads, bridges, railways, and post offices. Lenin then went to the Second Congress of Soviets of Workers' and Soldiers' Deputies to present the overthrow of the Provisional Government and state authority by the Bolshevik party. The Winter Palace (at the time, the home of the Provisional Government) was seized without a casualty the morning of the 26th, and the Congress had no choice but to approve Lenin's decree. With this, the period of dual power between the Provisional Government and Petrograd Soviet came to a close.

== Strategy and ideological concepts ==
As the ideological monopoly of dominant institutions is broken and people increasingly rely on Alternative Institutions (AIs), those who benefited from existing arrangements may seek to dismantle their competitors. At the same time, those who seek fundamental changes in society or who find the alternative ways of organizing it valuable may seek to enlarge and strengthen the alternative infrastructure. Counter institutions (XIs) are created both to defend the AIs and to promote their growth. These work to challenge and attack the status quo while creating, defending, and securing space for opposition and alternative institutions. They do this with everything from political protests, to direct appropriation (of plantations, government buildings, factories, etc.) for the use of alternative institutions, to civil disobedience or armed resistance. The line between AIs and XIs is seldom entirely clear as many alternative institutions are also self-promoting or defending. Together the AIs and XIs form an alternative source of power in society which is "necessarily autonomous from, and competitive with, the dominant system, seeking to encroach upon the latter's domain, and, eventually, to replace it."

Successful dual-power rebellions end with the acceptance of the new social forms by much of the populace and the realization by the old rulers that they are no longer capable of using their systems of force against the revolutionary movement. This can occur because noncooperation has crippled the old structures of power, because too few people remain loyal to the old rulers to enforce their will, or because the rulers themselves undergo an ideological conversion. At this point, there is not general confusion. The disappearance of old leaders and structures of power is accommodated by the expansion of the alternative system.

The French Marxist writer and guerilla partisan Régis Debray identified the concept of dual-power with that of the movement of Trotskyism in his 1967 work Révolution dans la Révolution? (Revolution in the Revolution?). Within the theory of dual-power, according to Debray, the guerilla movement is subordinated to that of the vanguard party which both inhibits the flexibility of tactics available to revolutionary guerilla armies and places them in a defensive position to protect vanguard party officials and assets. Debray's strategical framework largely identified with that of the Cuban Revolution, in particular that of Fidel Castro and Ernesto "Che" Guevara.

== Modern usage by libertarian socialists ==
Libertarian socialists have more recently appropriated the term to refer to the strategy of achieving a libertarian socialist economy and polity by means of incrementally establishing and then networking institutions of direct participatory democracy to contest the existing power structures of state and capitalism, ultimately leading to a revolutionary rupture. This does not necessarily mean disengagement with existing institutions; for example, Yates McKee describes a dual-power approach as "forging alliances and supporting demands on existing institutions – elected officials, public agencies, universities, workplaces, banks, corporations, museums – while at the same time developing self-organized counter-institutions." In this context, the strategy itself is sometimes also referred to as "counterpower" to differentiate it from the term's Leninist origins.

Strategies used by libertarian socialists to build dual power include:

- Mutualism – building alternative economies through cooperatives, credit unions and local purchasing.
- Municipalism – building popular assemblies to make decisions at the community level and displace both capitalism and the modern state.
- Syndicalism – building revolutionary trade unions to confront management in the workplace and ultimately overthrow capitalism. In its anarchist form, it seeks to simultaneously abolish the state.
- Council communism – building workers' councils as revolutionary workplace and governmental structures.
- Autonomist Marxism – building a variety of independent structures until a revolutionary overtaking of the state on the path to a libertarian communist society.

== Historical examples of dual power ==
- The Italian popolo in opposition to the nobles who controlled city states in the late 13th century gradually developed its own officials, who paralleled those of the commune.
- The Spanish Revolt of the Comuneros in 1520-1521 dual power in opposition to the prevailing royal administration of King Charles I.
- The Republic of Kosova and the Autonomous Province of Kosovo and Metohija
- Libya has been under dual power since the Second Libyan Civil War between the governments supported by the General National Congress and the High Council of State (National Salvation Government (2014–2017), Government of National Accord (2015–2021) and the Government of National Unity (2021–)) and the House of Representatives-supported governments (Second Al-Thani Cabinet (2014–2021) and the Government of National Stability (2022–))
- Yemen has been under dual power since the Yemeni civil war with North Yemen being controlled by the Houthi-led Supreme Political Council and South Yemen being controlled by different factions which form the Presidential Leadership Council
- Igor Strelkov, a separatist figure in eastern Ukraine, used the historical term "dual power" to refer to the situation in the city of Donetsk in mid-2014. Despite the presence of armed separatist militias in the city, its mayor and police forces remained loyal to Kyiv, taking orders from the Ukrainian authorities.

== See also ==
- Bibliography of the Russian Revolution and Civil War
- Outline of the Russian Revolution and Civil War
- Index of articles related to the Russian Revolution and Civil War
- The Dual Power
- Council communism
- Diarchy
- Dual state (model)
- Marxism–Leninism
- Rival government
