= Petrograd Soviet Order No. 1 =

1917 decree regarding military affairs

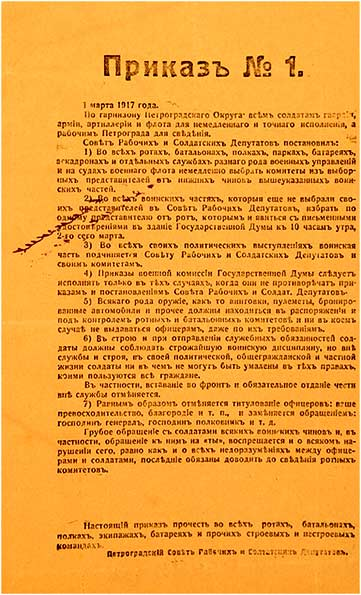
The Order No. 1

Order No. 1 (Russian: Prikaz nomer odin) was the first official decree of the Petrograd Soviet of Workers' and Soldiers' Deputies, issued on March 1, 1917 (March 14, New Style). It followed the February Revolution and was a response to actions taken the day before by the Provisional Committee of the State Duma, headed by Mikhail Rodzianko. On February 28, the Provisional Committee, acting as a government in Petrograd after the disintegration of the Tsarist authority and fearing that soldiers who had joined the revolution on February 26–27 (O.S.) without their officers (who had generally fled) might become an uncontrollable mob threatening the Duma, issued an order through the Duma's Military Commission. This order called on soldiers to return to their barracks and obey their officers.

The soldiers were skeptical of this order, partly because they viewed Rodzianko as too close to the Tsar (he had been President of the State Duma, which was seen as supportive of the Tsar). Some soldiers feared that sending them back to the barracks was an attempt to quash the Revolution, while most worried that they would be placed under their old, heavy-handed commanders, whose actions had led them to mutiny on the 27th, leaving their grievances unaddressed. In response, the Petrograd Soviet issued Order No. 1.

The order directed soldiers and sailors to obey their officers and the Provisional Government only if their orders did not contradict the Petrograd Soviet's decrees. It also called for units to elect representatives to the Soviet and for each unit to elect a committee to manage the unit. All weapons were to be handed over to these committees "and shall by no means be issued to the officers, not even at their demand." The order also permitted soldiers to dispense with standing at attention and saluting when off duty, while maintaining strict military discipline when on duty. Officers were no longer to be addressed as "Your Excellency" but as "Sir" ("Gospodin" in Russian), and they were forbidden from executing, corporally punishing, or even verbally abusing their soldiers. Soldiers of all ranks were to be addressed formally (with "vy" instead of "ty").

Despite a widespread belief that Order Number 1 infamously allowed for the election of officers, thereby undermining military discipline, the order makes no such provision. The elections mentioned in the order pertain to representatives to the Petrograd Soviet. This discrepancy arose from a proclamation issued around the same time by the Russian Social Democratic Labour Party (RSDLP – essentially the socialists, divided between the Mensheviks and the Bolsheviks) and the Petrograd Committee of Socialist Revolutionaries (SRs), calling on "Comrade Soldiers" to "elect for yourself platoon, company, and regimental commanders." The debate leading up to Order Number 1 included discussions of "sorting out" unfriendly (pro-Tsarist or counter-revolutionary) officers and excluding them from units, which may have been interpreted as a call for the election of officers. While unsympathetic, untrustworthy, or undesirable officers were blacklisted and forced out of their units, the actual election of officers did not occur.

== The order's impact ==
The order was highly controversial. Leon Trotsky called it "the single worthy document of the February Revolution," while others viewed it as an effort to prevent the continuation of Russia's war effort by crippling the government's control of the military, or even as a Bolshevik plot to undermine the Provisional Government. Many scholars have argued that it succeeded in the former sense. Michael Florinsky wrote that "it struck at the very heart of army discipline and contributed powerfully to the breakdown of the armed forces." George Katkov advanced the latter theory of a Bolshevik plot.

However, the order's intent was to restore discipline to the army and address complaints about officers returning to their units after the February Revolution and abusing their troops (as several soldiers reported to the Petrograd Soviet during the debate over the order). It was not intended to apply to armies at the front (as clarified in the order's sixth paragraph, this provision only applied while soldiers were off duty). Therefore, the extent to which Order Number 1 alone led to the breakdown of the Russian Army remains unclear.

Its immediate impact, however, was very clear. Within 48 hours of its proclamation, the Executive Committee attempted to issue “Order Number Two” in an unsuccessful attempt “to annul the first order, limiting its application to the Petrograd military district”. According to Leon Trotsky, it was “in vain” and “Order Number 1 was indestructible”.

== See also ==
- The Dual Power
