= Who, whom? =

Communist slogan

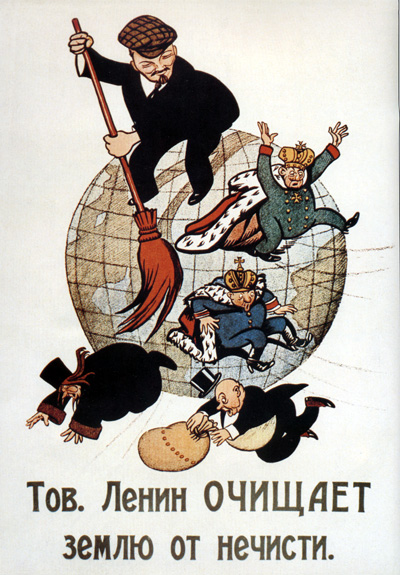
"Comrade Lenin Cleanses the Earth of Filth." (Mikhail Cheremnykh and Viktor Deni, 1920)

Who, whom? (Russian: кто кого?, kto kogo?; Russian pronunciation: [kto.kɐˈvo]) is a Bolshevik principle or slogan which was formulated by Vladimir Lenin in 1921.

== Origins and usage ==
Lenin is supposed to have stated at the second All-Russian Congress of Political Education Departments, on 17 October 1921,

Весь вопрос—кто кого опередит?

The whole question is—who will overtake whom?

— Lenin

Leon Trotsky used the shortened "who whom" formulation in his 1925 article, "Towards Capitalism or Towards Socialism?"

The shortened form was invoked by Joseph Stalin in 1929, in a speech to the Central Committee of the Communist Party of the Soviet Union, which also gave the formula its "aura of hard-line coercion" (while Lenin's phrase indicated a willingness to embrace economic competition):

The fact is, we live according to Lenin's formula: Kto–kogo?: will we knock them, the capitalists, flat and give them (as Lenin expresses it) the final, decisive battle, or will they knock us flat?

It came to be used as a formula describing the inevitability of class struggle, i.e. who (which of two antagonists) will dominate the other. In this view, all compromises and promises between enemies are just expedients – tactical maneuvers in the struggle for mastery.

== See also ==
- Cui bono
- Charles de Gaulle, who said "France has no friends, only interests."
- What Is to Be Done?
