= April Crisis =

Political crisis during the Russian Revolution

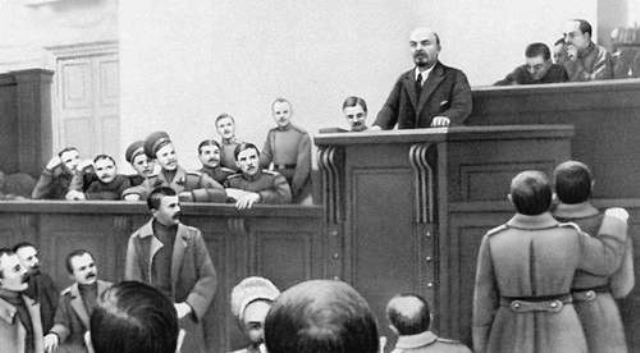
- Lenin reading his April Thesis to the Petrograd Soviet.
- Date: April 1917
- Location: Russian Provisional Government
- Cause: Russian involvement in World War I
- Outcome: Government resignations; Bolshevik popularity

The April Crisis, which occurred in Russia throughout April 1917, broke out in response to a series of political and public controversies. Conflict over Russia's foreign policy goals tested the dual power arrangement between the Petrograd Soviet and the Russian Provisional Government. The Executive Committee and the full Soviet endorsed Nikolai Sukhanov's "An Appeal to All the Peoples of the World", which renounced war and "acquisitionist ambitions." This appeal conflicted with the Provisional Government's position on annexations, and Foreign Minister Pavel Milyukov responded with the Milyukov note on 18 April declaring Russia's right to Constantinople and the Dardanelles.

Newspapers printed Milyukov's note on 20 April. Milyukov's note united disparate groups of Russians against the Provisional Government and Russian involvement in World War I. The public responded with mass demonstrations and violence in the streets of Petrograd, forcing Milyukov and War Minister Alexander Guchkov to resign. These events blurred the distinction between Dual Power, resulted in more governmental Soviet positions, and isolated the Bolsheviks as the only major Socialist party not affiliated with the Provisional Government.

== Background ==
After the end of Romanov rule in February 1917, Russia's new Provisional Government, composed of State Duma members and the Petrograd Soviet of Workers’ and Soldiers’ Deputies, governed Russia as halves of the Dual Power dynamic. Soviet participation in the Provisional Government swayed governmental policies, and cultivated the political issues of the April Crisis. At the time, Russia was embroiled in World War I, but was suffering catastrophic losses to German armies.

=== February Revolution ===
On 23 February, working class women stormed the streets of Petrograd, indicating the beginning of the February Revolution. This day was the socialist holiday International Women's Day, and women gathered to protest food shortages and high bread prices. In the following days, the protests intensified as both men and women marched towards the center of Petrograd. Russian police, known as the Cossacks, and soldiers from the Volhynian regiment, attempted to disseminate the crowd, but had little success. Four days later, on 27 February, key Russian military units allied themselves with the protestors, arresting Tsarist ministers the following day. During this span of time, Tsar Nicholas II had taken personal command of the Russian army. Upon receiving news about the unrest in Petrograd, the Tsar made the decision to return to the capital and restore order. However, the Tsar's generals and a delegation of politicians from the State Duma, persuaded him that only by abdicating the throne could he achieve social peace.

=== Dual power legitimizes Soviets ===
The Provisional Government and the Soviet of Workers' Deputies had conflicting plans for governance, and this disparity underlies much of the polarization and conflict of the April Crisis. Created from former representatives of the State Duma, the Provisional Government took power on 2 March. The Provisional Government questioned their own authority and was hesitant to exercise power. This created a void of decisive governance, and damaged the Provisional Government's standing among Russia's lower classes. But the Provisional Government was always somewhat distanced from workers, soldiers, and peasants. The Petrograd Soviet, on the other hand, possessed powerful street-level sway of worker and peasant opinions. This asset made cooperation with the Soviets imperative to the Provisional Government's success, as ignoring the Soviets meant relative isolation from large segments of the population, and greater unrest among lower classes. By cooperating with the Petrograd Soviet, the Provisional Government offered the Soviets a foundation from which they could draw power, and (to a certain extent) vindicated Soviet beliefs. It also gave them a powerful platform to voice their discontent with the Provisional Government's policies.

== Events ==
=== Appeal to All the Peoples of the World ===
On 1 March the Petrograd Soviet released "An Appeal to All the Peoples of the World," a letter written by Nikolai Sukhanov. The letter condemned Russia's participation in World War I, criticizing the country's enduring expansionist ambitions. It also sought to confine Russia's focus mostly to intra-national issues. The letter was released at a time of public turmoil and disenfranchisement with the Provisional Government. Russia's lower classes had seen no relief from the burdens of inflation and limited resources, and were becoming more inclined to the Soviet ideals.

=== Declaration of war aims ===
The Petrograd Soviet pressured the Provisional Government to speak against the aims of the old, tsarist regime in the war. On 14 March, the Provisional Government declared that Russia's goal was not to conquer people or territories, but was to achieve stable peace.

=== April Theses ===
On 3 April, the Bolshevik leader Vladimir Lenin arrived in Petrograd on a sealed train from Switzerland. At the Finland Station, he made statements against both the "Appeal to All the Peoples of the World" and the "Declaration of War Aims," instead demanding "all power to the soviets." He rejected any cooperation with the Provisional government or the Mensheviks, and called for withdrawal of Russia's troops from the war. Lenin's views on these issues were published in the Bolshevik newspaper, Pravda, on 7 April in what is known as his April Theses.

=== Milyukov note ===
On 18 April, the foreign minister, Paul Milyukov, sent a note to the Allies that said that Russia was determined to fight until World War I ended in victory. The note explained that the Provisional Government would readily enforce the usual "guarantees and sanctions" that would accompany victory. This statement implied that Russia would retain control of the Dardanelle Straits and Constantinople, as previously agreed upon by the Allies in 1915.

=== Mass demonstrations ===
In response to Milyukov's leaked notes, vast numbers of workers and soldiers took to the streets of Petrograd and Moscow. These demonstrations were sometimes violent: armed soldiers occupied the streets, and many skirmishes occurred between pro and anti-government activists. Brutality among anti-government protestors was aimed at the Provisional Government's inconsistent stance on Russia's participation in the war. Facing famine and inflation, protestors raised their voices to decry the Provisional Government's failure to represent their viewpoints and desires. Among protestors demands was the faint call for Soviet power, which displayed the evolving sentiments of Russia's populace, and foreshadowed the lower class-driven rise of the Soviets. Fearing that Russia was not ready for Soviet rule, Soviet leaders worked to pacify protestors and quell demonstrations.

== Aftermath ==
=== Government reshuffling ===
Responding to unrest among Russia's lower classes, Milyukov and the War Minister, Alexandr Guchkov, both resigned. The cabinet was subsequently reorganized to include socialists. Victor Chernov, a leader of the Socialist Revolutionaries (SRs) was now Minister of Agriculture, and Irakli Tsereteli, a Menshevik, was in charge of Posts and Telegraphs. The far-left leaning Bolsheviks refused to participate in what they viewed as the "bourgeois" coalition government. This left Lenin and the Bolsheviks as the only group that held fast to their anti-war policy, due to the collaboration and compromise needed for the other left-leaning political groups to work with the coalition government.

=== Increase in Bolshevik popularity ===
The Bolsheviks were the only political party that remained unwavering in their stance against Russia's involvement in the war. Lenin believed that the "international, imperialist war," would be better turned into a series of revolutionary wars within the warring nations. The Bolshevik Party's strict stance against Russia's participation in World War I led to an increase in the party's popularity.
