= Milyukov note =

Statement issued by Pavel Milyukov

The Milyukov note was a telegram, drafted by Foreign Minister Pavel Milyukov on behalf of the Russian Provisional Government in April 1917, important in the April Crisis period between the February Revolution and later October Revolution in Russian history. Sent in the wake of the abdication of Nicholas II and amidst the ongoing First World War, it was addressed to the Allied Powers. The telegram contained the statement that the Provisional Government would continue to fight against Imperial Germany, as had begun under the Tsar. Though it had broad agreement within the provisional government when drafted, the telegram came in the wake of widespread dissatisfaction in Russia with the course of the war. Ongoing Russian draft combat losses, such as at the disastrous Battle of Tannenberg early in the war and later in the successful but incredibly costly Brusilov offensive, had aided in the collapse of military and popular support for Tsar Nicholas II and ultimately helped force his abdication.

Public circulation of the note on April 20, 1917, prompted violent street protests in opposition to Russian participation in the war and outrage that the new government would continue Tsarist policies. It also led to condemnation by notable Marxists such as Vladimir Lenin and others who claimed the note was evidence that the Provisional Government was bowing to the interests of international capitalism and those who sought to continue the war for foreign conquest and other financial gain. Not only did the note's publication weaken the position of Milyukov, who faced public outrage, but it also exposed others in the Provisional Government such as Alexander Kerensky to face pressure from more activist left-wing elements such as the Bolsheviks who blamed him for agreeing to the Note's drafting. The pressure that resulted accelerated the April Crisis which increased popularity of the Bolsheviks and helped to further weaken and isolate the Provisional Government ahead of the October Revolution.
