= April Theses =

1917 directives by Vladimir Lenin

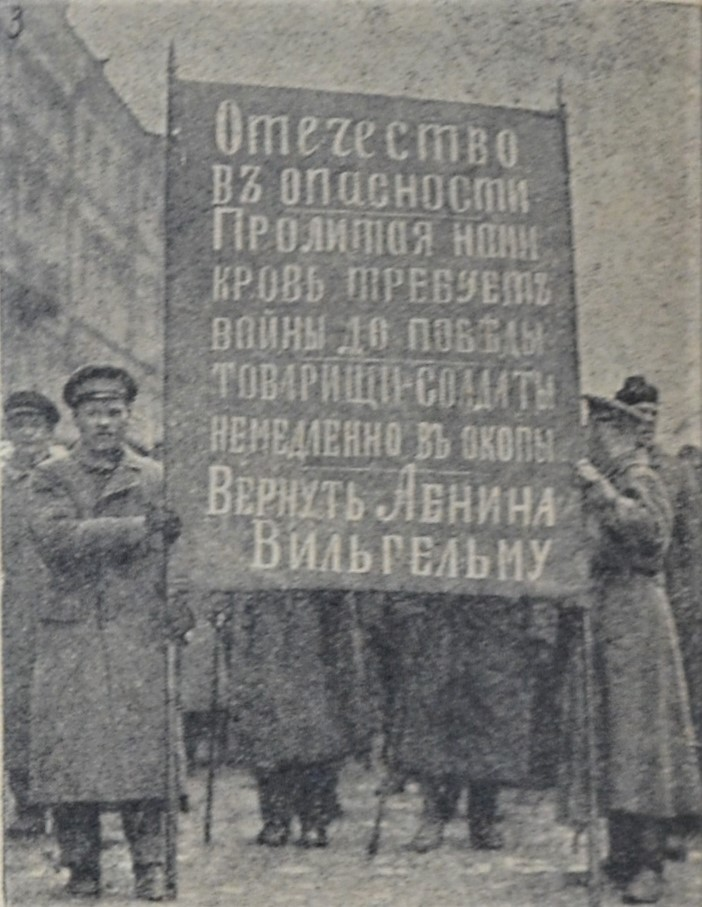
Manifestation of war veterans and invalids in Petrograd on 17 April 1917 against Lenin's arrival

The April Theses (Russian: апрельские тезисы, romanized: aprel'skie tezisy) were a series of ten directives issued by the Bolshevik leader Vladimir Lenin upon his April 1917 return to Petrograd from his exile in Switzerland via Germany, Sweden and Finland. The theses were mostly aimed at fellow Bolsheviks in Russia and returning to Russia from exile. He called for soviets (workers' councils) to seize state power (as seen in the slogan "all power to the soviets"), denounced liberals and social revolutionaries in the Provisional Government, called for Bolsheviks not to cooperate with the government, and called for new communist policies. The April Theses influenced the July Days and October Revolution in the next months and are identified with Leninism.

== Background ==
The February Revolution had resulted in the abdication of Tsar Nicholas II, the collapse of Imperial Russia, and the establishment of the liberal Provisional Government under Georgy Lvov and later Alexander Kerensky. The Provisional Government was dominated mainly by liberals and moderate socialists who wanted to instigate political reform, creating a democracy with elections for an executive and a constituent assembly.

After the February Revolution, Lenin sought to return to Russia as soon as possible. This was problematic because he was isolated in neutral Switzerland as World War I continued to be fought in neighbouring states. The Swiss communist Fritz Platten managed to negotiate with the German government for the safe passage of Lenin and his company through Germany by rail on the so-called "sealed train". The German government clearly hoped Lenin's return would create political unrest in Russia, which would lead to the capitulation of Russia and the end of Russian participation in the war on the Entente side, ending the war on the Eastern Front and allowing German forces to concentrate their fight against France, Britain, and allied forces on the Western Front. (Indeed, after the October Revolution resulted in the Bolshevik rise to power, this did occur with the Decree on Peace and Treaty of Brest-Litovsk.)

Once through Germany, Lenin continued by ferry to Sweden, and the remainder of the journey through Scandinavia was subsequently arranged by Swedish communists Otto Grimlund and Ture Nerman. On 16 April (3 April according to the old Russian Calendar) 1917, Lenin arrived by train to a tumultuous reception at Finland Station in Petrograd.

== The Theses ==
The April Theses were first published in a speech in two meetings on 17 April 1917 (4 April according to the old Russian Calendar). They were subsequently published in the Bolshevik newspaper Pravda. In the Theses, Lenin

1. condemns the Provisional Government as bourgeois and urges "no support" for it, as "the utter falsity of all its promises should be made clear". He condemns World War I as a "predatory imperialist war" and the "revolutionary defensism" of foreign social democrat parties, calling for revolutionary defeatism.
2. asserts that Russia is "passing from the first stage of the revolution—which, owing to the insufficient class consciousness and organization of the proletariat, placed power in the hands of the bourgeoisie—to its second stage, which must place power in the hands of the proletariat and the poorest sections of the peasants".
3. recognises that the Bolsheviks are a minority in most of the soviets against a "block of all the petty-bourgeois opportunist elements, from the Social-Cadets and the Socialist Revolutionaries down to the Organising Committee (Chkheidze, Tsereteli, etc.), Steklov, etc., etc., who have yielded to the influence of the bourgeoisie and spread that influence among the proletariat".
4. calls for a parliamentary republic not to be established and calls this a "retrograde step". He calls for "a republic of Soviets of Workers', Agricultural Labourers' and Peasants' Deputies throughout the country, from top to bottom".
5. calls for "abolition of the police, the army, and the bureaucracy" and for "the salaries of all officials, all of whom are elective and displaceable at any time, not to exceed the average wage of a competent worker".
6. calls for "The weight of emphasis in the agrarian programme to be shifted to the Soviets of Agricultural Labourers' Deputies", "confiscation of all landed estates", and "nationalisation of all lands in the country, the land to be disposed of by the local Soviets of Agricultural Labourers' and Peasants' Deputies. The organisation of separate Soviets of Deputies of Poor Peasants. The setting up of a model farm on each of the large estates (ranging in size from 100 to 300 dessiatines, according to local and other conditions, and to the decisions of the local bodies) under the control of the Soviets of Agricultural Labourers' Deputies and for the public account."
7. calls for "the immediate union of all banks in the country into a single national bank, and the institution of control over it by the Soviet of Workers' Deputies".
8. states that "it is not our immediate task to 'introduce' socialism, but only to bring social production and the distribution of products at once under the control of the Soviets of Workers' Deputies".
9. lists "party tasks" as "Immediate convocation of a party congress", "alteration of the party programme, mainly: (1) On the question of imperialism and the imperialist war, (2) On our attitude towards the state and our demand for a 'commune state', amendment of our out-of-date minimum programme, and change of the Party's name". Lenin notes that "instead of 'Social Democracy', whose official leaders throughout the world have betrayed socialism and deserted to the bourgeoisie (the 'defencists' and the vacillating 'Kautskyites'), we must call ourselves the Communist Party". The name change would dissociate the Bolsheviks from the social democratic parties of Europe supporting participation of their nation in World War I. Lenin first developed this point in his 1915 pamphlet "Socialism and War", when he first called the pro-war social-democrats "social chauvinists".
10. calls for a new "revolutionary International, an International against the social-chauvinists and against the 'Center'". This later became the Communist International (Third International) which was formed in 1919.

== Effects ==
After the February Revolution, Bolshevik leaders returning from exile (such as Lev Kamenev) were arguing a much more moderate line, that Russian involvement in the war could be justified and that there should be cooperation with the liberals in the Provisional Government. However, Lenin's arguments reflected those made by the leading Bolsheviks in Petrograd at the time of the February Revolution, such as Alexander Shlyapnikov. Joseph Stalin who had initially supported co operation with the Provisional Government changed his position upon reading the April Theses and spoke in favour of the programme at the Bolshevik city meeting in Petrograd.

After a heated discussion at the VII All-Russian Conference of the RSDLP(b) (April 24–29), with the participation of 133 delegates, the April Theses received the support of the majority of delegates from the field and formed the basis of the policy of the entire party.

== See also ==
- April Crisis, April 1917
- The Dual Power
