= Vladimir Lenin bibliography =

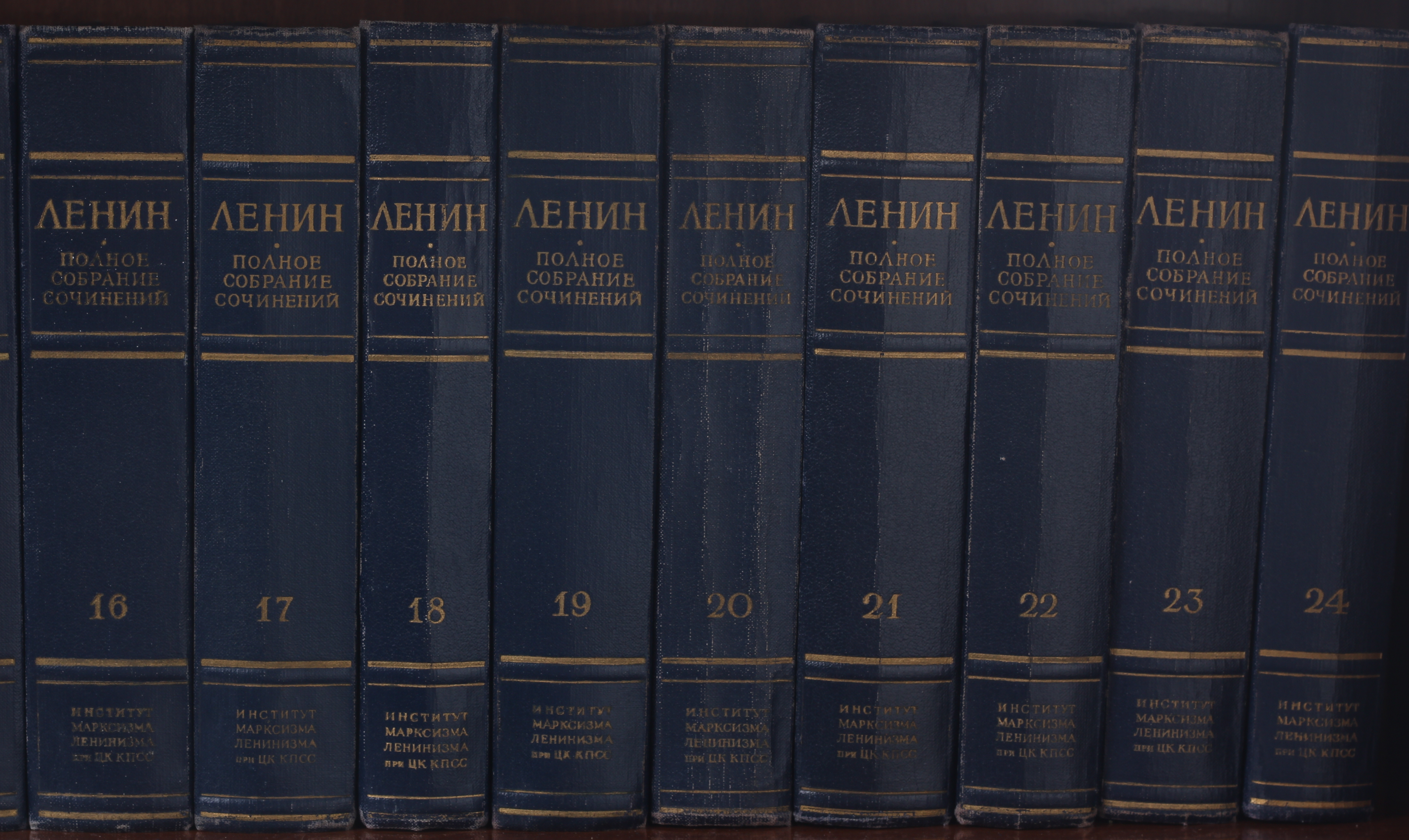
Complete Collected Works of Lenin. Gospolitizdat, 1958–.

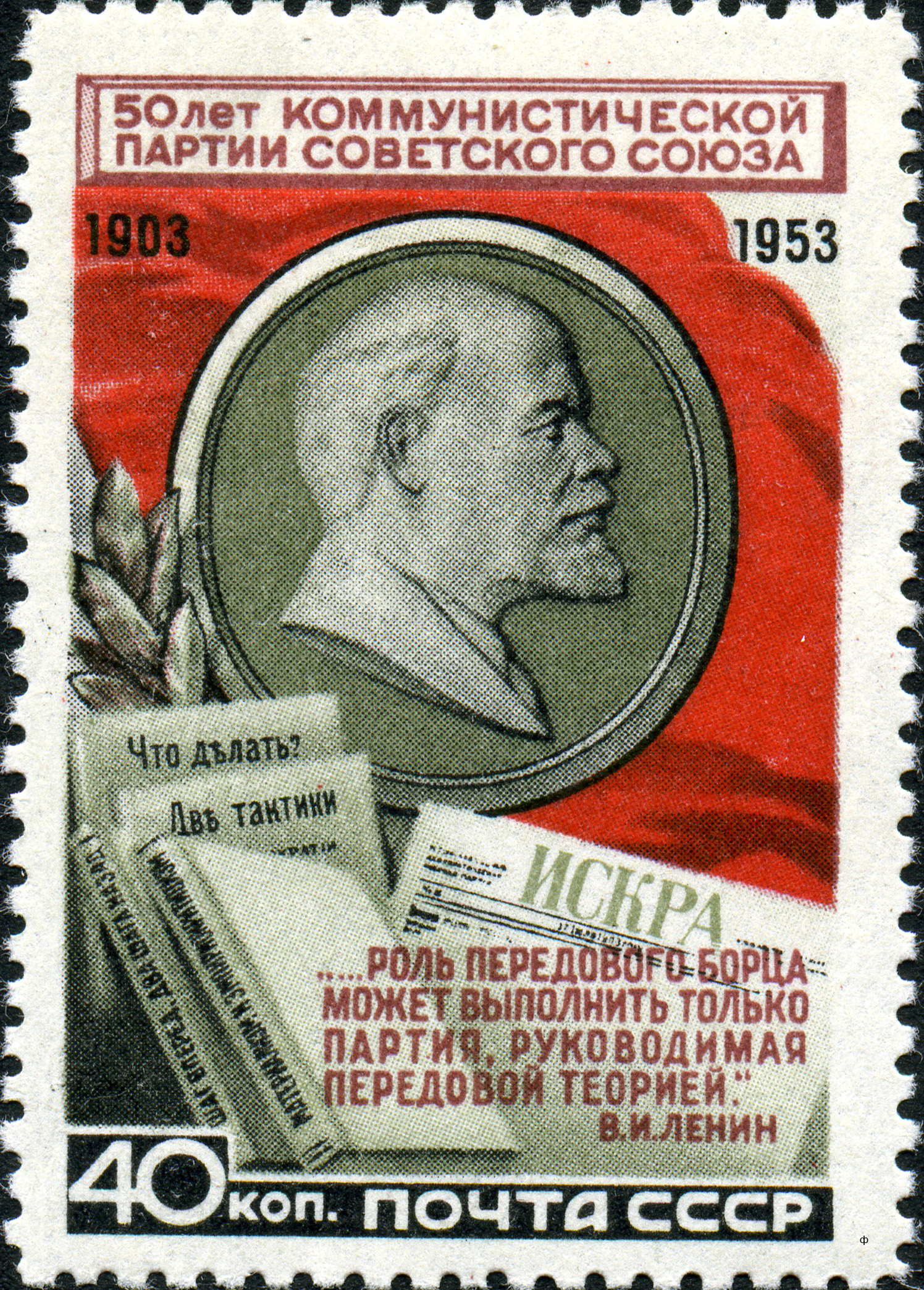
Several of Lenin's works depicted on a 1953 stamp (What Is to Be Done?, Two Tactics of Social Democracy in the Democratic Revolution, Materialism and Empirio-criticism, One Step Forward, Two Steps Back and Iskra), with a quote from What Is to Be Done?.

Vladimir Lenin (22 April [O.S. 10 April] 1870 – 21 January 1924) was a Russian communist revolutionary, politician, and political theorist. He served as head of government of the Russian Soviet Federative Socialist Republic from 1917, and of the Soviet Union from 1922. He was incapacitated by a series of strokes which began in May 1922, ending in his death early in 1924.

== Collected Works ==
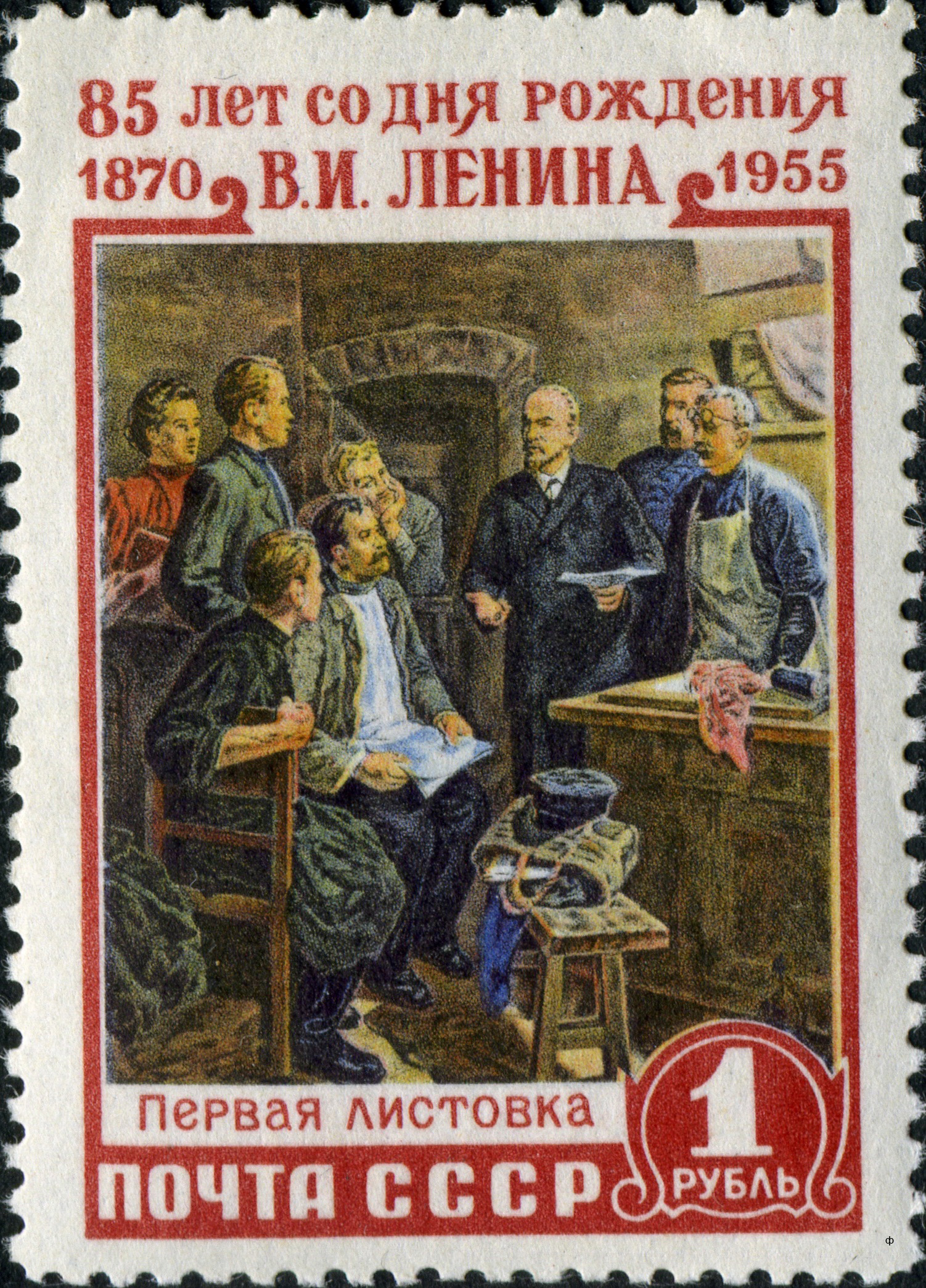
Lenin's first pamphlet, depicted on a 1955 stamp

The Lenin Complete Collected Works [Pol'noe sobranie sochinenii], the fifth Russian edition of Lenin's writings, is incorporated in 55 bound volumes, each of about 650 pages. The English edition published by Progress Publishers in Moscow from 1960 to 1970, is primarily based on the fourth Russian edition, published in the 1940s, and consists of 45 volumes. The final volumes of this English edition supplement the content of the Russian fourth edition with a selection of material from the Russian fifth edition.

The following table presents the general contents of each volume of the English edition.

Volume	Content	Dates	Notes	Volume Link
1	Writings	1893 – 1894		LINK
2	Writings	1895 – 1897		LINK
3	Book	—	Development of Capitalism in Russia	LINK
4	Writings	1898 – Feb. 1901		LINK
5	Writings	May 1901 – Feb. 1902	What Is to Be Done?	LINK
6	Writings	Jan. 1902 – Aug. 1903	Second Congress of the RSDLP	LINK
7	Writings	Sept. 1903 – Dec. 1904	One Step Forward, Two Steps Back	LINK
8	Writings	Jan. 1905 – July 1905		LINK
9	Writings	June 1905 – Nov. 1905	Two Tactics of Social Democracy in the Democratic Revolution	LINK
10	Writings	Nov. 1905 – June 1906		LINK
11	Writings	June 1906 – Jan. 1907		LINK
12	Writings	Jan. 1907 – June 1907		LINK
13	Writings	June 1907 – April 1908		LINK
14	Book	—	Materialism and Empiriocriticism	LINK
15	Writings	March 1908 – Aug. 1909		LINK
16	Writings	Sept. 1909 – Dec. 1910		LINK
17	Writings	Dec. 1910 – April 1912		LINK
18	Writings	April 1912 – March 1913		LINK
19	Writings	March 1913 – Dec. 1913		LINK
20	Writings	Dec. 1913 – Aug. 1914		LINK
21	Writings	Aug. 1914 – Dec. 1915		LINK
22	Writings	Dec. 1915 – July 1916	Imperialism, the Highest Stage of Capitalism	LINK
23	Writings	Aug. 1916 – March 1917	Letters from Afar	LINK
24	Writings	April 1917 – May 1917	"The April Theses"	LINK
25	Writings	June 1917 – Sept. 1917	The State and Revolution	LINK
26	Writings	Sept. 1917 – Feb. 1918	Can the Bolsheviks Retain State Power?	LINK
27	Writings	Feb. 1918 – July 1918		LINK
28	Writings	July 1918 – March 1919	The Proletarian Revolution and the Renegade Kautsky	LINK
29	Writings	March 1919 – Aug. 1919	Draft Program of the RCP(b)	LINK
30	Writings	Sept. 1919 – April 1920		LINK
31	Writings	April 1920 – Dec. 1920	"Left-Wing" Communism: An Infantile Disorder	LINK
32	Writings	Dec. 1920 – Aug. 1921	The Tax in Kind	LINK
33	Writings	Aug. 1921 – March 1923	On Cooperation / Better Fewer, But Better	LINK
34	Correspondence	1895 – 1911		LINK
35	Correspondence	1912 – 1922		LINK
36	Correspondence	1900 – 1923	Supplemental correspondence.	LINK
37	Correspondence	1893 – 1922	Correspondence with relatives.	LINK
38	Notebooks	—	Philosophical notebooks.	LINK
39	Notebooks	—	Notebooks on Imperialism	LINK
40	Notebooks	—	Agrarian Notebooks	LINK
41	Writings	1896 – 1917	Addenda from 5th edition.	LINK
42	Writings	1917 – 1923	Addenda from 5th edition.	LINK
43	Correspondence	1893 – 1917	Addenda from 5th edition.	LINK
44	Correspondence	1917 – 1920	Addenda from 5th edition.	LINK
45	Correspondence	1920 – 1923	Addenda from 5th edition.	LINK

== Selected Works ==
Lenin Selected Works comprise 3 volumes, translated into English by Progress Publishers, Moscow, 1970. The following table presents works included.

Title	Year (Note: Works are listed in order of appearance in Selected Works.)
Karl Marx: A Brief Biographical Sketch With an Exposition of Marxism	1914
The Three Sources and Three Component Parts of Marxism	1913
Marxism and Revisionism	1908
The Heritage We Renounce	1897
What Is To Be Done? Burning Questions of our Movement	1901–2
One Step Forward, Two Steps Back (The Crisis in Our Party)	1904
The Beginning of the Revolution in Russia	1905
Two Tactics of Social Democracy in the Democratic Revolution	1905
Lessons of the Moscow Uprising	1906
On the Road	1909
In Memory of Herzen	1912
Disruption of Unity Under Cover of Outcries for Unity	1914
The Right of Nations to Self-Determination	1914
The War and Russian Social-Democracy	1914
On the National Pride of the Great Russians	1914
On the Slogan for a United States of Europe	1915
Editorial Comment by Sotsial-Demokrat on the Manifesto on War Issued by the Central Committee of the R.S.D.L.P.	1915
Imperialism, the Highest Stage of Capitalism	1916
The Nascent Trend of Imperialist Economism	1916
The Military Programme of the Proletarian Revolution	1916
Letters from Afar	1917
The Tasks of the Proletariat in the Present Revolution (The April Theses)	1917
The Dual Power	1917
The Tasks of the Proletariat in Our Revolution	1917
The Seventh (April) All-Russia Conference of the R.S.D.L.P. (B.)	1917
Introduction to the Resolutions of the Seventh (April) All-Russia Conference of the R.S.D.L.P.(B.)	1917
First All-Russia Congress of Soviets of Workers’ and Soldiers’ Deputies	1917
The Eighteenth of June	1917
What Could the Cadets have Counted On When They Withdrew From the Cabinet?	1917
Where is State Power and Where is Counter-Revolution?	1917
Three Crises	1917
The Question of the Bolshevik Leaders Appearing in Court	1917
The Political Situation	1917
Letter to the Editors of Proletarskoye Dyelo	1917
On Slogans	1917
Lessons of the Revolution	1917
To the Central Committee of the R.S.D.L.P.	1917
On Compromises	1917
Draft Resolution On the Present Political Situation	1917
The Impending Catastrophe and How to Combat It	1917
One of the Fundamental Questions of the Revolution	1917
The Russian Revolution and Civil War	1917
The State and Revolution	1917
Marxism and Insurrection	1917
From a Publicist's Diary	1917
The Crisis Has Matured	1917
Can the Bolsheviks Retain State Power?	1917
Letter to the Central Committee, the Moscow and Petrograd Committees and the Bolshevik Members of the Petrograd and Moscow Soviets	1917
Advice of an Onlooker	1917
Letter to the Bolshevik Comrades Attending the Congress of Soviets of the Northern Region	1917
Meeting of the Central Committee of the R.S.D.L.P.(B.), October 10 (23)	1917
Meeting of the Central Committee of the R.S.D.L.P.(B.), October 16 (29)	1917
Letter to Bolshevik Party Members	1917
Letter to the Central Committee of the R.S.D.L.P.(B.)	1917
Letter to Y. M. Sverdlov	1917
Letter to Central Committee Members	1917
To the Citizens of Russia!	1917
Second All-Russia Congress of Soviets of Workers' and Soldiers' Deputies	1917
Wireless Message of the Council of People's Commissars, October 30 (November 12)	1917
Speeches at a Meeting of the Central Committee of the R.S.D.L.P.(B.), November 1 (14)	1917
Resolution of the Central Committee of the R.S.D.L.P.(B.) On the Opposition Within the Central Committee, November 2 (15)	1917
Ultimatum From the Majority on the Central Committee of the R.S.D.L.P.(B.) to the Minority	1917
To the Population	1917
Reply to Questions From Peasants	1917
From the Central Committee of the Russian Social-Democratic Labour Party (Bolsheviks)	1917
The Extraordinary All-Russia Congress of Soviets of Peasants' Deputies	1917
Alliance Between the Workers and the Working and Exploited Peasants	1917
Session of the All-Russia Central Executive Committee, December 1 (14)	1917
Report On the Economic Condition of the Petrograd Workers and the Tasks of the Working Class Delivered at a Meeting of the Workers' Section of the Petrograd Soviet of Workers' and Soldiers' Deputies, December 4 (17)	1917
Theses on the Constituent Assembly	1917
For Bread and Peace	1917
Speech on the Nationalisation of the Banks Delivered at a Meeting of the All-Russia Central Executive Committee, December 14 (27)	1917
Draft Decree On the Nationalisation of the Banks and on Measures Necessary For Its Implementation	1917
How to Organise Competition?	1917
Declaration of Rights of the Working and Exploited People	1918
Draft Decree On the Dissolution of the Constituent Assembly	1918
On the History of the Question of the Unfortunate Peace	1918
Afterword to the Theses On the Question of the Immediate Conclusion of a Separate and Annexationist Peace	1918
Speeches On War and Peace at a Meeting of the C.C. of the R.S.D.L.P.(B.), January 11 (24)	1918
Third All-Russia Congress of Soviets of Workers', Soldiers' and Peasants' Deputies, January 10-18 (23-31)	1918
Draft Wireless Message to the Government of the German Reich	1918
The Socialist Fatherland is in Danger!	1918
Position of the C.C. of the R.S.D.L.P. (Bolsheviks) on the Question of the Separate and Annexationist Peace	1918
A Painful But Necessary Lesson	1918
Draft Decision of the Council of People's Commissars On the Evacuation of the Government	1918
Strange and Monstrous	1918
Extraordinary Seventh Congress of the R.C.P.(B.), March 6-8	1918
The Chief Task of Our Day	1918
Extraordinary Fourth All-Russia Congress Of Soviets, March 14-16	1918
The Immediate Tasks of the Soviet Government	1918
Draft Plan of Scientific and Technical Work	1918
Six Theses On the Immediate Tasks of the Soviet Government	1918
"Left-Wing" Childishness and the Petty-Bourgeois Mentality	1918
Theses On The Present Political Situation	1918
On the Famine	1918
Speech at the First All-Russia Congress of Economic Councils	1918
Comments On the Draft "Regulations For the Management of the Nationalised Enterprises"	1918
Fifth All-Russia Congress of Soviets of Workers', Peasants', Soldiers' and Red Army Deputies	1918
Speech at a Meeting in Presnya District, July 26	1918
Speech at a Joint Session of the All-Russia Central Executive Committee, the Moscow Soviet, Factory Committees and Trade Unions of Moscow, July 29	1918
Comrade Workers, Forward to the Last, Decisive Fight!	1918
Letter to American Workers	1918
Joint Session of the All-Russia Central Executive Committee, the Moscow Soviet, Factory Committees and Trade Unions	1918
The Valuable Admissions of Pitirim Sorokin	1918
The Proletarian Revolution and the Renegade Kautsky	1918
First Congress of the Communist International, March 2-6	1919
Eighth Congress of the R.C.P.(B.), March 18-23	1919
Theses of the Central Committee of the Russian Communist Party (Bolsheviks) On the Situation On the Eastern Front	1919
Greetings to the Hungarian Workers	1919
A Great Beginning	1919
All Out for the Fight Against Denikin!	1919
The State	1919
Letter to the Workers and Peasants Apropos of the Victory Over Kolchak	1919
The Example of the Petrograd Workers	1918
Results of Party Week in Moscow and Our Tasks	1918
Economics And Politics in the Era of the Dictatorship of the Proletariat	1919
Address to the Second All-Russia Congress of Communist Organisations of the Peoples of the East, November 22	1919
Eighth All-Russia Conference of the R.C.P.(B.), December 2-4	1919
Draft Resolution On Foreign Policy	1919
Speech Delivered at the First Congress of Agricultural Communes and Agricultural Artels	1919
Letter to the Workers and Peasants of the Ukraine Apropos of the Victories Over Denikin	1919
In Reply to Questions Put By Karl Wiegand, Berlin Correspondent of Universal Service	1920
Interview With Lincoln Eyre, Correspondent of the American Newspaper The World	1920
Ninth Congress of the R.C.P.(B.), March 29-April 5	1920
Report of the Central Committee, March 29	1920
From the Destruction of the Old Social System to the Creation of the New	1920
"Left-Wing" Communism: An Infantile Disorder	1920
Speech to Men of the Red Army Leaving for the Polish Front	1920
Theses for the Second Congress of the Communist International	1920
Second Congress of the Communist International, July 19-August 7	1920
The Tasks of the Youth Leagues	1920
On Proletarian Culture	1920
Speech Delivered at an all-Russia Conference of Political Education Workers of Gubernia and Uyezd Education Departments, November 3	1920
Draft Resolution on "The Tasks of the Trade Unions, and the Methods of Their Accomplishments"	1920
Eighth All-Russia Congress of Soviets, December 22-29	1920
Once Again On The Trade Unions, The Current Situation and the Mistakes of Trotsky and Buhkarin	1921
Integrated Economic Plan	1920
Tenth Congress of the R.C.P.(B.), March 8-16	1921
The Tax in Kind	1921
Tenth All-Russia Conference of the R.C.P.(B.), May 26-28	1921
Third Congress Of The Communist International	1921
Fourth Anniversary of the October Revolution	1921
The Importance of Gold Now and After the Complete Victory of Socialism	1921
Directives For the Soviet Delegation to the Genoa Conference	1922
On the Significance of Militant Materialism	1922
Eleventh Congress Of The R.C.P.(B.)	1922
On the Tenth Anniversary of Pravda	1922
On the Establishment of the U.S.S.R.	1922
RE The Monopoly of the Foreign Trade	1922
Fourth Congress of the Communist International, November 5-December 5	1922
Five Years of the Russian Revolution and the Prospects of the World Revolution	1922
Speech at a Plenary Session of the Moscow Soviet, November 20	1922
Last Letters and Articles	1922
Letter to the Congress, December 23	1922
Letter to the Congress, December 24	1922
Addition to the Letter of December 24, 1922	1922
Granting Legislative Functions to the State Planning Commission	1922
Addition to the Section on Increasing the Number of C.C. Members	1922
The Question of Nationalities or "Autonomisation"	1922
The Question of Nationalities or "Autonomisation" (Continued)	1922
Pages From a Diary	1923
On Co-operation	1923
Our Revolution	1923
How We Should Reorganise the Workers' and Peasants' Inspection	1923
Better Fewer, But Better	1923

== Other works ==
Title	Year
"Our Immediate Task"	1899
Materialism and Empirio-criticism	1909
Philosophical Notebooks	1916

== See also ==
- Joseph Stalin bibliography
- List of speeches given by Vladimir Lenin
- Marxist bibliography
