= Joseph Stalin bibliography =

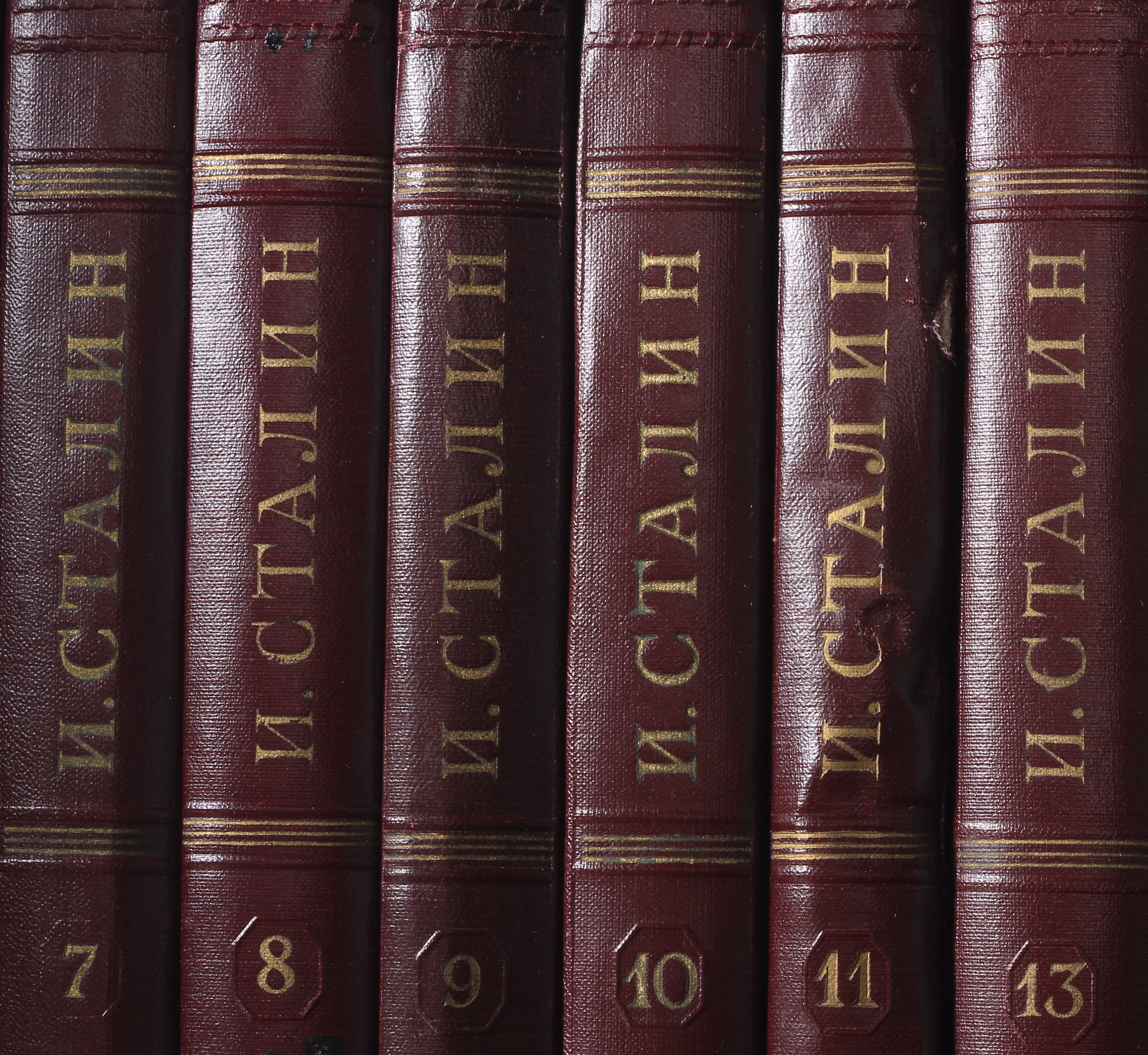
Russian edition of the Stalin Works, which were uniform across multiple languages.

Joseph Vissarionovich Stalin [ru: Иосиф Виссарионович Сталин] (né Dzhugashvili [Джугашвили]) (Note: Stalin's birth name was Ioseb Besarionis dze Jughashvili (იოსებ ბესარიონის ძე ჯუღაშვილი), represented in Russian as Iosif Vissarionovich Dzhugashvili (Иосиф Виссарионович Джугашвили; pre-1918: Іосифъ Виссаріоновичъ Джугашвили). He adopted the alias "Stalin" during his revolutionary career and made it his legal name after the October Revolution.) (18 December [O.S. 6 December] 1878 – 5 March 1953) was a Georgian-born revolutionary, politician, and Marxist theoretician who led the Soviet Union from 1924 until his death in the spring of 1953.

This is a bibliography of books, pamphlets, and other material written by Stalin which have been published in the English language.

== Works (so-called "Collected Works") ==
During the middle 1920s, as historian Geoffrey Roberts observes, a "small industry" emerged publishing the collected works of prominent Bolshevik worthies, including V.I. Lenin, Lev Kamenev, Grigory Zinoviev, and Leon Trotsky. Having produced a smaller number of leaflets, pamphlets, articles, published speeches, and books than his peers, Stalin was not immediately part of this publishing frenzy, with his first systematic selected works volume appearing only in 1926.

Initial planning and collection of material for a Stalin collected works began in the early 1930s, with Stalin himself outlining a plan for an 8-volume collection in 1931. Stalin's secretary Ivan Tovstukha began the process of gathering such materials about this time. In August 1935, shortly after the death of Tovstukha, the Politburo began to push forward definitively on a Stalin collected works project, passing a revolution decreeing that such a collection should be published and assigning the Marx–Engels–Lenin Institute (IMEL) the job of compiling and producing such a work, operating in conjunction with the propaganda department of the All-Union Communist Party (of Bolsheviks) [VKP(b)].

Propaganda department chief Alexei Stetsky was the first coordinator of the project, outlining a plan for a 10-volume series of Stalin collected works in November 1935. This set was to include all of Stalin's previously published writings, supplemented with previously unpublished transcripts of speeches, letters, and telegrams. Publication was to be made not only in Russian and the other national languages of the Soviet Union, but also in an array of foreign languages, according to Stetsky's plan.

This project underestimated the difficulty of the project and its scope, however, and projections rose from 10 to 12 volumes, and later to 16. Nevertheless, according to Stetsky's plan, actual publications were to begin in 1936 and to be completed by 1937 — in time for celebration of the 20th anniversary of the Bolshevik revolution.

The Stalin Sochineniia (Works) was published in 13 volumes from 1946 until 1954. It is not truly a "Collected Works" per se, being incomplete both in terms of chronology (ending with material published in January 1934) and content (suffering tendious alterations, after-the-fact editing, and omissions of many complete items) even within the truncated timeline.

Volume	Content	Dates	Notes	Volume Link
1	Writings	1901 – 1907	Anarchism or Socialism?	LINK
2	Writings	1907 – 1913	Marxism and the National Question	LINK
3	Writings	March 1917 – Oct. 1917	Revolutionary journalism and speeches.	LINK
4	Writings	Nov. 1917 – 1920	Civil war journalism, speeches, and letters.	LINK
5	Writings	1921 – 1923	Organizational report to 12th Congress of the VKP(b)	LINK
6	Writings	1924	On Lenin / Foundations of Leninism	LINK
7	Writings	1925	Political Report of the CC to the 14th Congress VKP(b)	LINK
8	Writings	Jan. 1926 – Nov. 1926	"The Social Democratic Deviation in Our Party"	LINK
9	Writings	Dec. 1926 – July 1927	Speeches at 7th Enlarged Plenum of ECCI	LINK
10	Writings	Aug. 1927 – Dec. 1927	Political Report of the CC to the 15th Congress VKP(b)	LINK
11	Writings	Jan. 1928 – March 1929	Speeches at the July 1928 Joint Plenum CC and CCC	LINK
12	Writings	April 1929 – June 1930	The Right Deviation in the VKP(b)	LINK
13	Writings	July 1930 – Jan. 1934	Report of the CC to the 17th Party Congress CPSU(b)	LINK

== Problems of Leninism (Selected Works) ==
For the introduction to the first edition of this book, see On the Problems of Leninism

Unlike his Communist Party peers V.I. Lenin, Leon Trotsky, Grigory Zinoviev, and Lev Kamenev, there was no attempt made at publishing a comprehensive collection of Stalin's writings in the 1920s. Instead, a selected works volume called Problems of Leninism [Voprosy leninizma] first appeared in 1926. It remained in print for the rest of Stalin's life, running through 11 editions before being terminated in 1954, following his death. Content of this volume changed over time. The table below lists the contents of the 1st, 9th, and 11th editions of this volume, all of which are readily available in English translation.

Prior to 1940, the English translation of this selected works collection was simply titled Leninism.

Title	Item date	Type	1st Edition	9th Edition	11th Edition
Foundations of Leninism	April–May 1924	Speech	yes	yes	yes
The October Revolution and the Tactics of the Russian Communists	17 December 1925	Book Preface	yes	yes	yes
On the Problems of Leninism	25 January 1926	Book Preface	yes	yes	yes
Results of the Work of the 14th Conference of the VKP(b)	9 May 1925	Speech	yes	yes	no
The Nationalist Question in Yugoslavia	30 March 1925	Speech	yes	yes	no
Political Tasks of University of Peoples of the East	18 May 1925	Speech	yes	yes	no
Questions and Answers	9 June 1925	Speech	yes	yes	no
The Nationalist Question Once Again	November 1925	Article	yes	yes	no
The Tasks of the Young Communist League			yes	yes	no
Political Report of the CC to the 14th Congress of the VKP(b)	18 December 1925	Speech	yes	no	no
Slogan of the Dictatorship of the Proletariat...in Preparation for October	20 May 1927	Letter	no	yes	yes
The Question of the Workers' and Peasants' Government	June 1927	Letter	no	yes	no
The Party's Three Fundamental Slogans of the Party on the Peasant Question	July 1927	Letter	no	yes	yes
Interview with the First American Labor Delegation in Russia	9 September 1927	Interview	no	yes	no
Interview with the Foreign Workers' Delegations	5 November 1927	Interview	no	yes	no
The International Character of the October Revolution	6 November 1927	Article	no	no	yes
Regarding the Workers' and Peasants' Government			no	yes	no
On the Grain Front	28 May 1928	Speech	no	yes	yes
Lenin on the Alliance with the Middle Peasants			no	yes	yes
The July Plenum of the Central Committee of the VKP(b)	13 July 1928	Speech	no	yes	no
The Right Danger in the VKP(b)	19 October 1928	Speech	no	yes	yes
The Industrialization of the Country and the Right Deviation in the VKP(b)	19 November 1928	Speech	no	yes	no
The Right Deviation in the All-Union Communist Party	22 April 1929	Speech	no	yes	yes
A Year of Great Change	3 November 1929	Article	no	yes	yes
Problems of Agrarian Policy in the Soviet Union	27 December 1929	Speech	no	yes	yes
On the Policy of Liquidating the Kulaks as a Class	19 January 1930	Article	no	yes	yes
Dizzy with Success	2 March 1930	Article	no	yes	yes
Reply to Collective Farm Comrades	3 April 1930	Article	no	yes	yes
Political Report of the CC to the 16th Congress of the VKP(b)	27 June 1930	Speech	no	yes	no
The Tasks of Business Executives	4 February 1931	Speech	no	yes	yes
New Conditions, New Tasks	23 June 1931	Speech	no	yes	yes
Some Questions Concerning the History of Bolshevism	late October 1931	Letter	no	yes	yes
The Results of the First Five-Year Plan	7 January 1933	Speech	no	no	yes
Work in the Rural Districts	11 January 1933	Speech	no	no	yes
Speech at the First Congress of Collective Farm Shockworkers	19 February 1933	Speech	no	no	yes
Report of the CC to the 17th Congress of the CPSU(b)	26 January 1934	Speech	no	no	yes
Address to Graduates from the Red Army Academies	4 May 1935	Speech	no	no	yes
Speech at the First All-Union Conference of Stakhanovites	17 November 1935	Speech	no	no	yes
On the Draft Constitution of the USSR	25 November 1936	Speech	no	no	yes
Dialectical and Historical Materialism	September 1938	Book Chapter	no	no	yes
Report of the CC to the 18th Congress of the CPSU(b)	10 March 1939	Speech	no	no	yes

== English-language pamphlets ==
The following pamphlets were published in English translation but never appeared in Problems of Leninism or Works or in the standard collection of World War II-related speeches and orders of the day, On the Great Patriotic War of the Soviet Union. Most of these have alternate titles for national reprints. Pamphlets which were incorporated into any of the standard Stalin works collections mentioned above are not included. Produced in a multitude of alternate titles in English-speaking countries around the globe, the total of such "reused" English-language pamphlets issued runs into the hundreds.

Title	Item date	Type	Publisher	Publication Date	Notes
Stalin's Speeches on the American Communist Party	6 May 1929; 14 May 1929	Speeches	Central Committee, CPUSA	1929	Anti-Lovestone. Edition of 100,000.
Two Speeches: 1. Speech at a Conference of Harvester-Combine Operators. 2. Speech at a Conference of the Foremost Collective Farmers of Tajikistan and Turkmenistan		Speech	Cooperative Publishing Society (Note: Full name of the publisher was "Co-operative Publishing Society of Foreign Workers in the USSR." Despite the apparent "grassroots" name, this was the official state publisher for material in foreign languages, after 1938 the "Foreign Languages Publishing House.")	1935	
Interview Between J. Stalin and Roy Howard, March 1, 1936	1 March 1936	Interview	Cooperative Publishing Society	1936	
Defects in Party Work and Measures for Liquidating Trotskyite and Other Double-Dealers	3 March 1937; 5 March 1937	Speech	Cooperative Publishing Society	1937	Reissued as Mastering Bolshevism.
Speech Delivered at a Meeting of Voters of the Stalin Electoral Area, Moscow, December 11, 1937, in the Grand Theatre	11 December 1937	Speech	Cooperative Publishing Society	1937	First of two times Stalin stood for election.
The Final Victory of Socialism in the Soviet Union: Stalin's Reply to Ivanov		Letter	Communist Party of Great Britain	1938	American title: A Letter to Ivanov.
Speech Delivered at an Election Meeting in the Stalin Election District, Moscow, February 9, 1946	9 February 1946	Speech	Foreign Languages Publishing House	1946	Second of two times Stalin stood for election.
J.V. Stalin on Post-War International Relations: Full Text of Interviews to Press Correspondents and Exchange of Messages, 1946-47	1946–1947	Interviews	Soviet News	1947	
Marxism and Problems of Linguistics		Pamphlet	Foreign Languages Publishing House	1950	American title: Marxism and Linguistics [1951].
Interview with Pravda Correspondent [on Atomic Weapon]	16 February 1951	Interview	Foreign Languages Publishing House	1951	Multiple titles and publishers.
Economic Problems of Socialism in the USSR	1 October 1952	Pamphlet	Foreign Languages Publishing House	1952	

== English-language topical collections ==
A number of English-language titles collect speeches and articles dealing with specific themes, occasionally featuring material not published in Works, Problems of Leninism, or as free-standing pamphlets. Several symposiums including one reprinted Stalin article are excluded.

Title	Publisher	Date	Russian edition?	Russian date	Notes
Building Collective Farms	Workers Library [USA]	1931	no	—	
The October Revolution: A Collection of Speeches and Articles	Cooperative Publishing Society	1934	yes	1934	
Marxism and the National and Colonial Question	International Publishers [USA]	1935	yes	1934	Includes article "Marxism and the National Question"
Lenin Stalin 1917: Selected Writings and Speeches	Foreign Languages Publishing House	1938	yes	1937	
The Russian Revolution: Writings and Speeches from the February Revolution to the October Revolution, 1917	International Publishers [USA]	1938			
The War of National Liberation: War-time Addresses of the Soviet Premier	International Publishers [USA]	1942	no	—	Wartime speeches, orders of the day
The War of National Liberation II: A Second Collection of the Wartime Addresses of the Soviet Premier	International Publishers [USA]	1943	no	—	Wartime speeches, orders of the day
On the Great Patriotic War of the Soviet Union (Note: American title: The Great Patriotic War of the Soviet Union [1945]. UK title: War Speeches, Orders of the Day and Answers to Foreign Press Correspondents during the Great Patriotic War [1946].)	Foreign Languages Publishing House	1944			Wartime speeches, orders of the day
On Lenin	Foreign Languages Publishing House	1946	yes		
For Peaceful Coexistence	International Publishers	1951	no	—	
Stalin on China: A Collection of Five Writings of Comrade Stalin on the Chinese Question	People's Publishing House [India]	1951	no	—	Reprinted in the US by Hyperion Press, 1977.
Correspondence Between the Chairman of the Council of Ministers of the USSR and the Presidents of the US and the Prime Ministers of Great Britain During the Great Patriotic War of 1941–1945. (two volumes) (Note: UK title: Stalin's Correspondence with Churchill, Attlee, Roosevelt and Truman [one volume, 1958]. An extensively annotated edition of much of this material appearing in the United States is David Reynolds and Vladimir Pechatnov (eds.), The Kremlin Letters: Stalin's Wartime Correspondence with Churchil and Roosevelt. (Yale University Press, 2018).)	Foreign Languages Publishing House	1957	yes	1957	Reissued 1986.
The Tehran, Yalta, & Potsdam Conferences: Documents	Progress Publishers	1969	yes	1967	Reissued 1980s.
On the Opposition	Foreign Languages Press [China]	1974	yes	1928	Problematic translations from Works used.
Stalin's Letters to Molotov	Yale University Press	1995			
Dimitrov and Stalin, 1934–1943: Letters from the Soviet Archives	Yale University Press	2000			
The Stalin–Kaganovich Correspondence, 1931–36	Yale University Press	2003	yes	2001	

== History of the CPSU(b): Short Course ==
The History of the Communist Party of the Soviet Union (Bolsheviks): Short Course, commonly known as the Short Course, is a special case in the Stalin literary corpus. While the basic writing of the book was done by others, Stalin took a direct and active hand in the editing process — restructuring the periodization, rewriting passages, and contributing an entire chapter ("Dialectical and Historical Materialism.") While not properly a work by Stalin, neither should it be considered a mere editing job.

Conceived as a training manual for students and party cadres, the Short Course was first published in English in 1939 by the Foreign Languages Publishing House in Moscow, and was rapidly reprinted by various English-speaking Communist Parties around the world.

== Unofficial Works continuations ==
The Stalin Works was originally projected as series of 16 volumes, of which only the first 13 saw print before the posthumous policy of destalinization tenuously began in the Soviet Union in 1954. Over the ensuing decades, various unofficial efforts have been made to continue and complete the truncated Works series.

Stalin scholar Robert H. McNeal has noted that

According to the original plan for the series, as set forth in [Volume 1, pages v to iiii], there were to have been three more volumes, bringing the collection up to the end of the Second World War. Had the dictator been followed by more loyal heirs, it is reasonable to surmise that they would have wished to see the extension of the series, covering the period 1946–53.

The three projected volumes were to include the Short Course in full as forthcoming volume l5, even though the book was belatedly attributed to Stalin only in 1946, with his authorship formally recanted in 1956.

In 1965, McNeal embarked on a project to publish material for the years 1934 to 1953 counted as Sochineniia volumes 14, 15, and 16, with Stanford's Hoover Institution publishing the material in volumes of a similar size and shape to the original series. McNeal made the editorial decision to include only the chapter on "Dialectical and Historical Materialism" in his three volume extension, which eventually saw print in 1967. The volumes were published only in Russian, however, with McNeal pointing to six topical collections readily available in English translation for "the majority of the documents included in the present continuation."

== Uncontroversially omitted works ==
In an introductory section to a 1967 bibliography of Stalin's published works, Robert McNeal marks the existence of "a large body of material which bears Stalin's name but is in essence the work of staff assistants assigned to certain routine activities." These are said to include official notices of military promotions announced in Pravda during World War II, brief notes of thanks to various factories and collective farms for having donated money to the war effort, and acknowledgments of messages from international figures for best wishes extended to the USSR in connection with certain anniversaries or achievements.

McNeal observes that "not even Stalinist bibliographers bothered to list all these empty documents, and no attempt to fill this gap seems necessary today."

On top of this, some but not all short messages of congratulation sent by Stalin to various Soviet citizens, economic officials, and military school commanders were considered part of the Stalin literary corpus, McNeal notes. The dividing line for planned inclusion in the Stalin Works seems to have been ill-defined, making their inclusion in any future project at least somewhat problematic.

== See also ==
- Bibliography of Stalinism and the Soviet Union
- Vladimir Lenin bibliography
