= Criticism and self-criticism =

Concept of Marxism–Leninism

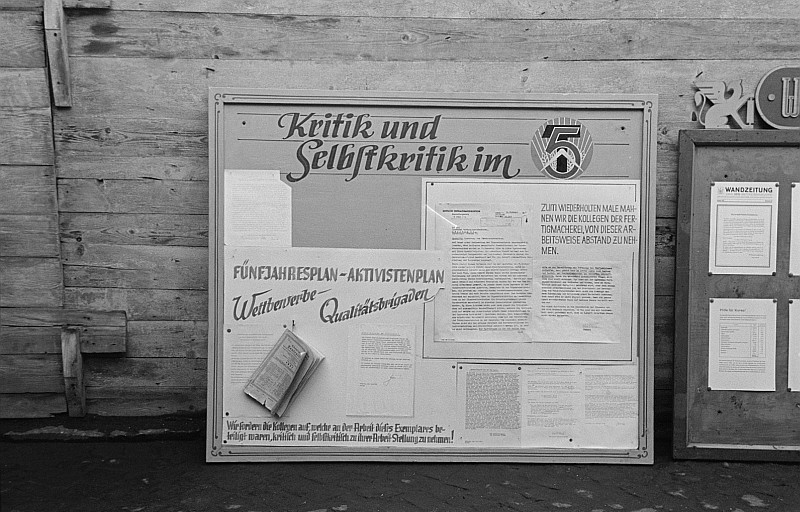
East German factory wall newspaper "Criticism and Self-Criticism in Five-Year Plans" in Leipzig, 1951

Criticism and self-criticism or autocritique is a core democratic centralist principle. In practice, people (especially party members) are encouraged to assess their own mistakes and ideological failures, usually confessing them in a public setting to encourage behavior modification.

The concept of self-criticism is a component of some Marxist schools of thought, primarily that of Marxism–Leninism, Maoism and Marxism–Leninism–Maoism. The concept was first introduced by Joseph Stalin in his 1924 work The Foundations of Leninism and later expanded upon in his 1928 work Against Vulgarising the Slogan of Self-Criticism. The Marxist concept of self-criticism is also present in the works of Mao Zedong, who dedicates an entire chapter of The Little Red Book to the issue. Accordingly, many party members in the Eastern Bloc who had fallen out of favor with the nomenklatura were forced to undergo self-criticism sessions, producing either written or verbal statements detailing their ideological errors and affirming their renewed belief in the party line.

== History ==
=== Soviet Union ===
According to David Priestland, the concept of politically enforced "criticism and self-criticism" originated during the 1921–1924 purges of academia in the Soviet Union. This eventually developed into the practice of "criticism and self-criticism" campaigns in which intellectuals suspected of possessing counter-revolutionary tendencies were publicly interrogated as part of a policy of "proletariatization."

Joseph Stalin introduced the concept of self-criticism (Russian: самокритика, romanized: samokritika) in his 1924 work The Foundations of Leninism. He would later expand this concept in his 1928 article "Against Vulgarising the Slogan of Self-Criticism". Stalin wrote in 1928 "I think, comrades, that self-criticism is as necessary to us as air or water. I think that without it, without self-criticism, our Party could not make any headway, could not disclose our ulcers, could not eliminate our shortcomings. And shortcomings we have in plenty. That must be admitted frankly and honestly." For Stalin self-criticism was not supposed to be "temporary and transient" but an "indispensable and permanent weapon in the arsenal of Bolshevism".

However, Stalin posited that self-criticism "date[s] back to the first appearance of Bolshevism in our country". Stalin stated that self-criticism was needed even after obtaining power as failing to observe weaknesses "make things easier for their enemies" and that "without self-criticism there can be no proper education of the Party, the class, and the masses". Vladimir Lenin wrote in One Step Forward, Two Steps Back (1904) that the Russian Social Democratic Labour Party engages in "self-criticism and ruthless exposure of their own shortcomings". Lenin further discussed the idea in "Left-Wing" Communism: An Infantile Disorder (1920), "Frankly admitting a mistake, ascertaining the reasons for it, analysing the circumstances which gave rise to it, and thoroughly discussing the means of correcting it—that is the earmark of a serious party". Lenin again further elaborated at a later date (1922) that "All the revolutionary parties that have perished so far, perished because they grew conceited, failed to see where their strength lay, and feared to speak of their weaknesses. But we shall not perish, for we do not fear to speak of our weaknesses and shall learn to overcome them".

According to the official history of the October Revolution and Soviet Union produced under Stalin, The History of the Communist Party of the Soviet Union (Bolsheviks), the concept is described briefly in the twelfth chapter,

In order to be fully prepared for this turn, the Party had to be its moving spirit, and the leading role of the Party in the forthcoming elections had to be fully ensured. But this could be done only if the Party organizations themselves became thoroughly democratic in their everyday work, only if they fully observed the principles of democratic centralism in their inner-Party life, as the Party Rules demanded, only if all organs of the Party were elected, only if criticism and self-criticism in the Party were developed to the full, only if the responsibility of the Party bodies to the members of the Party were complete, and if the members of the Party themselves became thoroughly active.

Following the death of Joseph Stalin in 1953, successor to Soviet premiership Nikita Khrushchev would reaffirm the Communist Party of the Soviet Union's ideological dedication to the concepts of "criticism and self criticism" in the conclusion to the 1956 speech before the 20th Party Congress, while also denouncing the policies and actions of Stalin.

=== China ===
Mao Zedong provides a significant focus on the idea of self-criticism (Chinese: 自我批评; pinyin: zìwǒ pīpíng), dedicating a whole chapter of the Little Red Book to the issue. Mao saw "conscientious practice" of self-criticism as a quality that distinguished the Chinese Communist Party from other parties. Mao championed self-criticism saying "dust will accumulate if a room is not cleaned regularly, our faces will get dirty if they are not washed regularly. Our comrades' minds and our Party's work may also collect dust, and also need sweeping and washing."

Mao saw the timing of self-criticism as important also, writing that "do it in good time; don't get into the habit of criticizing only after the event". Mao advocated "active ideological struggle" in the form of self-criticism while warning "we must not become complacent over any success. We should check our complacency and constantly criticize our shortcomings"

He said "inner-Party criticism is a weapon for strengthening the Party organization and increasing its fighting capacity"; however, he warned against criticism degenerating into personal attacks - "The method of correction is to help Party members understand that the purpose of criticism is to increase the Party's fighting capacity in order to achieve victory in the class struggle and that it should not be used as a means of personal attack".

In the People's Republic of China, self-criticism—called ziwo pipan (自我批判) or jiǎntǎo (检讨)—is an important part of Maoist practice. Mandatory self-criticism as a part of political rehabilitation common under Mao and ended by Deng Xiaoping, is known as a struggle session in reference to class struggle.

As General Secretary of the Chinese Communist Party, Xi Jinping has partially brought back the practice of self-criticism. The first of his Party's Education Programs on Selected Themes dealt with the mass line and required cadres to make self-criticism before their subordinates and to solicit critique from their subordinates. The Central Committee's 2016 Guidelines on Intra-Party Life in the New Situation also encourage self-criticism.

=== Vietnam ===
Vietnamese leader Ho Chi Minh made numerous references to the importance of self-criticism (Vietnamese: tự phê bình) within the Communist Party of Vietnam. In 1956 he critically assessed the Communist Party as having leaders who did not practice self-criticism and that criticism from the lower levels of the party was also lacking.

=== Cambodia ===
In Pol Pot's Democratic Kampuchea, self-criticism sessions were known as rien sot (រៀនសូត្រ), meaning "learning and reciting". In his memoir The Gate, François Bizot recalls observing the Khmer Rouge engaging in frequent self-criticism to reinforce group cohesion during his imprisonment in rural Cambodia in 1971:

Several evenings a week—every evening it didn't rain—the guards gathered for a collective confession. Douch (Kang Kek Iew) did not take part. I was a privileged witness to these circles, where they would sit on the ground under the direction of an elder. Military homilies alternated with simple, repetitive songs. "Comrades," began the eldest, "let us appraise the day that has passed, in order to correct our faults. We must cleanse ourselves of the repeated sins that accumulate and slow down our beloved revolution. Do not be surprised at this!"
"I," said the first one, "should have replaced the rattan rod today, the one north of the first shelter, which we use to dry clothes. I have done nothing about it... on account of my laziness." The man presiding over the session nodded with a frown, though not severely, only meaning to show that he knew how hard it was to combat inertia, so natural in man when he is not sustained by revolutionary convictions. He passed wordlessly onto the next man, indicating who this should be by pursing his lips in his direction.

=== North Korea ===
North Koreans are required to engage in saenghwal ch’onghwa (생활총화) sessions in which they confess to wrongdoings, transgressions, and deviations from Kim Il Sung's Ten Principles for the Establishment of a Monolithic Ideological System. They are required to attend self-criticism sessions from the age of 8. Members of the ruling Korean Workers' Party can be dismissed if they do not attend sessions for longer than three months. Inmates at North Korean kwalliso camps are required to engage in self-criticism sessions, which often lead to harsh collective punishments for entire work-units. The practice was introduced in 1962 during a series of ideological disputes with the Soviet Union.

=== Outside the Communist Bloc ===
French Marxist philosopher Louis Althusser wrote "Essays in Self-Criticism" focused on the issue of ideologically correcting ideas expressed in his prior works, most prominently For Marx and Reading Capital.

Feminist activist Carol Hanisch cited both Black Liberation and Maoist theory, and in particular Maoist notions of "speaking bitterness" and "self-criticism", for helping to develop the idea of consciousness raising groups within American radical feminism.

The American New Left revolutionary organization Weather Underground dedicated a chapter of their work Prairie Fire to self-criticism of their prior revolutionary strategies. Likewise, the German Red Army Faction discussed the issues of self criticism in their publication The Urban Guerrilla Concept. Within the Japanese New Left groups, "internal struggle" (内ゲバ, uchigeba) sometimes manifested as violent self-criticism sessions, in order to expose those among their members who were not deemed ideologically pure enough. The United Red Army, for example, murdered 14 of its 29 members in less than a year through such sessions.

== See also ==
- Mass line
- Mutual criticism, a practice of the Oneida Community
- Re-education camp
- Political rehabilitation
- Seek truth from facts
- Self-criticism
- Struggle session
- Consciousness raising, activism popularized by Second-wave feminism in the late 1960s, partly inspired by Criticism and self-criticism.
- Repentance, similar practice in religions, though not necessarily collective.
