= Political rehabilitation =

Regaining positive political reputation

Political rehabilitation is the process by which a disgraced member of a political party or a government is restored to public respectability and thus political acceptability. The term is usually applied to leaders or other prominent individuals who regain their prominence after a period in which they have no influence or standing, including deceased people who are vindicated posthumously. Historically, the concept is usually associated with Communist states and parties where, as a result of shifting political lines often as part of a power struggle, leading members of the Communist Party find themselves on the losing side of a political conflict and out of favour, often to the point of being denounced, imprisoned or even executed.

These individuals may be rehabilitated either as a result of capitulating to the dominant political line and renouncing their former beliefs or allegiances to disgraced leaders, or they may be rehabilitated as a result of a change in the political leadership of the party, either a change in personnel or a change in political line, so that the views or associations which caused the individual, or group of individuals, to fall into disgrace are viewed more sympathetically.

Well-known figures who have been rehabilitated include Deng Xiaoping who fell into disgrace during the Cultural Revolution for being a "third roader" but was rehabilitated subsequently and became paramount leader of the People's Republic of China; and Russia's last Tsar, Nicholas II, and his family, who were all shot dead by Bolshevik revolutionaries in July, 1918, but were rehabilitated by the Russian Supreme Court on 1 October 2008.

== China ==
Rehabilitation (Chinese: 平反; pinyin: píngfǎn) was carried out at many stages in the history of the People's Republic of China, but most significantly during the Boluan Fanzheng period, after the 3rd plenary session of the 11th Central Committee of the Chinese Communist Party that marked the reform and opening ups of Deng Xiaoping. Rehabilitation committees (Chinese: 平反委员会; pinyin: Píngfǎn Wěiyuánhuì) considered appeals from both the Central Committee of the Chinese Communist Party as well as from petitions—often in the form of big-character posters—by ordinary citizens. Reformer Hu Yaobang led a series of rehabilitations from 1978 to 1981 of people persecuted by the Gang of Four during the Cultural Revolution (1966–1976), including former chairman of China Liu Shaoqi.

== Soviet Union ==
In the context of the former Soviet Union, and the Post-Soviet states, rehabilitation (Russian: реабилитация, transliterated in English as reabilitatsiya or academically rendered as reabilitacija) was the restoration of a person who was criminally prosecuted without due basis, to the state of acquittal.

Mass amnesty of the victims of Soviet repressions started after the death of Joseph Stalin. Initially, in 1953, this did not entail any form of exoneration. This release became coupled with rehabilitations after Nikita Khrushchev's denunciation of Stalinism in his 1956 speech On the Personality Cult and its Consequences. Several entire nationality groups that had been deported to Siberia, Kazakhstan, and Central Asia during population transfer were rehabilitated in the late 1950s.

Both the modern Russian Federation and Ukraine have enacted laws "On the Rehabilitation of the Victims of Political Repressions", which provide the basis for the continued post-Stalinist rehabilitation of victims.

== See also ==
- Self-criticism
