= The Right of Nations to Self-Determination =

1914 work by Vladimir Lenin

The Right of Nations to Self-Determination (Russian: О праве наций на самоопределение, romanized: O prave natsiy na samoopredeleniye) is a work by Vladimir Lenin written in February–May 1914.

It dealt with the national question in relation to countries such as Norway, Poland and Russia.

A polemic against Rosa Luxemburg, it was written in the vein of "The Awakening in the East."

== See also ==
- Vladimir Lenin bibliography
- The National Question and Autonomy
