= The National Question and Autonomy =

1909 article by Rosa Luxemburg

The National Question and Autonomy is an article by Rosa Luxemburg, one of five originally published in 1908–1909 in Przegląd Socjaldemokratyczny (Social Democratic Review) in Kraków. The collection included "The Polish Question at the International Congress in London"; "Foreword to the Anthology The Polish Question and the Socialist Movement"; "The National Question and Autonomy"; "There Can Be No Self-Determination Under Capitalism"; and "The Nationalities Question in the Russian Revolution."

In discussing the national question Luxemburg was particularly interested in her native Poland, though she drew on general arguments about capitalist development and its implications for national movements everywhere. Her position on proletarian internationalism has been described as “national nihilism” and “international proletariat fundamentalism”.

== Ideas ==
In “The National Question and Autonomy,” Luxemburg does not use Poland as a model for all other national questions; nor does she oppose every element in all nationalist movements. The key questions for her include: Who exactly do we mean when we speak of a “nation”? Who can actually exercise national rights when nations are governed by a bourgeoisie that claims a monopoly in expressing the national will? Rejecting the notion that the nation is a “homogenous sociopolitical entity,” she concludes that genuine “self-determination” rests not with the “nation” but rather with the proletariat.

=== Opposition to Lenin ===
Luxemburg challenged the ideas on national rights put forward by Lenin in a number of articles in 1902–1903. In these, Lenin articulated the position of the Bolsheviks, supporting the right of nations to self-determination. The most important of these was The National Question in Our Program, but the topic was also covered in On the Manifesto of the League of the Armenian Social-Democrats and The Position of the Bund in the Party.

In this article, Luxemburg stated that "the actual possibility of 'self-determination' for all ethnic groups or otherwise defined nationalities is a utopia precisely because of the trend of historical development of contemporary societies." This trend involved the growth of a few powerful nations as the leaders in capitalist development, meaning that the smaller nations were always more or less dependent in their goodwill or support. "Big-power economy and politics--a condition of survival for the capitalist states--turn the politically independent, formally equal, small European states into mutes on the European stage and more often into scapegoats", as she put it. Hence, in her view, "the idea of insuring all 'nations' the possibility of self-determination is equivalent to reverting from Great-Capitalist development to the small medieval states."

In addition, she argued, the colonial ventures of the leading capitalist countries ensured that self-determination was already a less realistic prospect than ever before. "The very development of international trade in the capitalist period brings with it the inevitable, though at times slow ruin of all the more primitive societies, destroys their existing means of 'self-determination,' and makes them dependent on the crushing wheel of capitalist development and world politics." Thus, she maintained, "a general attempt to divide all existing states into national units and to re-tailor them on the model of national states and statelets is a completely hopeless, and historically speaking, reactionary undertaking."

=== “Nation” and “nationality” ===
In The National Question and Autonomy Luxemburg drew a distinction between the 'nation' (political) and 'nationality' (cultural), arguing that because of society’s class divisions, a "nation", as a homogeneous social and political entity, could not exist. There was thus no such thing as 'national self-determination', a formulation she described as consisting merely of 'metaphysical phrases'. 'Nations' have no 'will' of their own, and if this purported 'will' is simply the will of the majority, such a principle cannot be accepted by revolutionaries because nations were created as the result of economic processes and class struggles, not by majority voting. “Nationality” in the sense of a distinct cultural reality in language, art and literature, on the other hand, was something she readily acknowledged, without agreeing that it conferred any political rights.

=== Poland, Lithuania and Ukraine ===
Despite this, Luxemburg recognised that the harshness of Russian rule in Poland meant a solution of the national question could not wait for the victory of socialism. Luxemburg therefore hesitantly accepted the case for the territorial autonomy of Poland within the Russian empire. Interestingly she did not accept a similar case for the autonomy of Lithuania. Her main argument in favour autonomy in Poland was that the territory had 'its own bourgeois development, urban life, intelligentsia, its own literary and scholarly life', whereas she maintained that Lithuania was a mixture of different nationalities culturally dominated by a Polish minority. Her judgement of Ukraine was even harsher: she saw it as a country 'without any historical tradition and without any national culture', hence that Ukrainian nationalism was 'a mere whim, a folly of a few dozen petit-bourgeois intellectuals'.

== Criticism ==
Lenin replied to Luxemburg's criticism in a series of articles he wrote in 1913-1914, among which the main ones were The Right of Nations to Self-Determination and Critical Remarks on the National Question.

== See also ==
- Marxism and the National Question (1913) by Stalin
- The Right of Nations to Self-Determination (1914) by Lenin
