= The Three Sources and Three Component Parts of Marxism =

1913 article by Vladimir Lenin

The Three Sources and Three Component Parts of Marxism (Russian: Три источника и три составных части марксизма, romanized: Tri istochnika i tri sostavnykh chasti marksizma) is an article written by the Russian revolutionary Vladimir Lenin and published in 1913. The article was dedicated to the thirtieth anniversary of Karl Marx’s death.

== Main points ==
In The Three Sources and Three Component Parts of Marxism, Lenin opposes those who treat Marxism as a kind of “pernicious sect”. In rejecting these reproaches, Lenin stresses in every way possible that Marxism emerged as a natural result of the entire preceding history.

The history of philosophy and the history of social science show with perfect clarity that there is nothing resembling “sectarianism” in Marxism, in the sense of its being a hidebound, petrified doctrine, a doctrine which arose away from the high road of the development of world civilisation.

Lenin argues that Marxism, on the contrary, is a consistent theory resulting from the processing, critical re-interpretation and creative development of the best that human thought produced in the nineteenth century. According to Lenin, the theoretical sources of Marxism are classical German philosophy, classical English political economy, French utopian socialism and French materialism. The direct predecessors who made the greatest impact on the philosophical views of Marx and Engels were Hegel and Feuerbach. In a changed form, Hegel's dialectical ideas became the philosophical source of materialist dialectics. In their critique of Hegel's idealist views, Marx and Engels relied on the whole of the materialist tradition, and above all on Feuerbach's materialism. Dialectical materialism is the result of a radical creative transformation of Hegel's and Feuerbach's systems on the basis of a new interpretation of social and natural reality:

Marx deepened and developed philosophical materialism to the full, and extended the cognition of nature to include the cognition of human society. His historical materialism was a great achievement in scientific thinking.

The ideas of the outstanding English economists, Adam Smith (1723–1790) and David Ricardo (1772–1823), who laid the foundations of the economic anatomy of bourgeois society and substantiated the labour theory of value, helped Marx and Engels to evolve the social philosophy of historical materialism.

== Influence ==
In the USSR, Lenin's article “The Three Sources and Three Component Parts of Marxism” offering a concise exposition of the essence and origin of Marxism was a must-read not only for the students of higher educational establishments, but also for the senior pupils. A specific quote: "Marxist doctrine is omnipotent because it is true" (Russian: "Учение Маркса всесильно, потому что оно верно"), was widely used in both Soviet propaganda and educational literature as a motto.

In his book Revolutionary Strategy Marxist theoretician Mike Macnair points to Chartism as the fourth source of Marxism and links its omission by Lenin to "both the general loss of democratic-republican understanding in the Second International, and the specific political regression of the British labour movement after 1871".

== See also ==
- Vladimir Lenin bibliography
