= Foundations of Leninism =

1924 publication written by Joseph Stalin

- Tenth-anniversary edition (1934)
- Author: Joseph Stalin
- Original title: Об основах ленинизма
- Language: Russian
- Genre: Political philosophy
- Publisher: Pravda
- Publication date: 1924
- Publication place: Soviet Union
- Media type: Print

Foundations of Leninism (Russian: Об основах ленинизма, Ob osnovakh leninizma) was a 1924 collection made by Joseph Stalin that consisted of nine lectures he delivered at Sverdlov University that year. It was published by the Soviet newspaper Pravda.

== Background ==
After the January 1924 death of Vladimir Lenin, a power struggle began among factions of the Communist Party of the Soviet Union. Stalin allied himself with fellow Soviet politicians Grigory Zinoviev and Lev Kamenev.

The book contains the written text of nine lectures Stalin delivered to trainee party activists at Sverdlov Communist University, and was the first work produced by Stalin since the 1917 October Revolution.

== Synopsis ==
Stalin's nine lectures covered the historical roots of Leninism, methods, theory, the dictatorship of the proletariat, the peasant question, the national question, strategy and tactics (two lectures), and style of work. He focused his first lecture on the issue of the historical roots of Leninism as a form of Marxism. According to Stalin, "Leninism is Marxism of the era of imperialism" and the guiding ideology of the Bolsheviks. He lists three contradictions which imperialism brings to capitalism:

- The contradiction between labor and capital
- The contradiction between financial groups and imperialist nations
- The contradiction between ruling nations and colonial (dependent) nations and peoples

These factors, associated with imperialism, increase the contradictions already present in capitalist countries. The lecture builds on Lenin's writings about the nature of imperialism, particularly 1917's Imperialism, the Highest Stage of Capitalism.

Stalin opens his second lecture, on methods, with a reference to the period of the Second International in which Karl Kautsky and other orthodox Marxists adopted "opportunistic" (revisionist) principles to preserve unity in the social-democratic parties. It was due to this opportunism that Kautsky and the parties did not endorse revolutionary socialist tactics and programs, instead favoring Eduard Bernstein's reformism. According to Stalin, the Second International became "antiquated", "chauvinistic", and "narrow-minded" at the onset of World War I by supporting the war and opposing violent proletarian revolution; Leninism, with its success in the October Revolution and the Russian Civil War, became Marxism's main legitimate tendency. He defines the methods of Leninism as:

- Testing the theoretical dogmas of the Second International and the restoration of theory and practice
- Testing the policy of the parties of the Second International
- Reorganization of all party work along new, revolutionary lines, preparing the masses for revolutionary struggle
- Self-criticism, with the party a means of regulating opinion and assessing strategy

The concept of self-criticism was developed and expanded as an essential component of party politics, with Stalin justifying the doctrine by citing Lenin's "Left-Wing" Communism: An Infantile Disorder. Self-criticism, according to Stalin, should be considered an essential component of Leninist (Marxist–Leninist) political ideology.

== Reception ==
Cover of a 1925 edition published by the Soviet State Publishing House.

Bolshevik Leon Trotsky (who led the leftist opposition to Stalin) referred to the lectures in The Permanent Revolution as "ideological garbage", "an official manual of narrow-mindedness" and "an anthology of enumerated banalities", characterizing them as part of a propaganda campaign by Zinoviev, Bukharin, and Kamenev. Zinoviev replied to such criticism in Leninism: Introduction to the Study of Leninism.

According to Trotskyist historian Isaac Deutscher, Foundations of Leninism was withdrawn from circulation due to conflicts between the text and Stalin's recently developed concept of socialism in one country. Stalin produced a follow-up text, On the Problems of Leninism, which presents a 'corrected' conception of Marxism–Leninism in which socialism can be produced by focusing on the industrial economy of a single state. Erik van Ree, a lecturer at the University of Amsterdam's Institute of Eastern European Studies, notes that Foundations of Leninism contributed to Stalin's developing synthesis of Marxism with Russian nationalism in the form of social patriotism.

In contrast to the Trotskyist movement, African American civil rights activist and Soviet politburo member Harry Haywood received the text extremely positively, particularly praising Stalin's theories on the nature of imperialism in relation to Jim Crow and slavery.

== Plagiarism allegation ==
Historian Stephen Kotkin accuses Stalin of plagiarizing Foundations of Leninism from Soviet journalist Filipp Ksenofontov. This view has been shared by several other historians although opinions vary on the degree of plagiarism derived from Ksenofontov's work. However, other prominent scholars take a contrary view of this claim.

== See also ==
- History of the Soviet Union
- Lenin Enrollment
- Marxism–Leninism
- Stalinism
