= On the Problems of Leninism =

1926 publication written by Joseph Stalin

- Title page of the first edition of K voprosam leninizma
- Author: Joseph Stalin
- Original title: К вопросам ленинизма
- Language: Russian
- Publication date: 1926
- Publication place: Soviet Union
- Media type: Print

This is about the 1926 book introduction, reprinted as a pamphlet. For the Joseph Stalin Selected Works volume, see Joseph Stalin bibliography

On the Problems of Leninism (Russian: К вопросам ленинизма, K voprosam leninizma) was a short book by Joseph Stalin, dated January 1926 and part of the debate among the political leadership of the Communist Party of the Soviet Union to define and delineate so-called "Leninism" following the death of Soviet leader Vladimir Lenin in January 1924. Written after the removal of Leon Trotsky as head of the Red Army, the work is a polemic against Leningrad party boss and president of the Communist International Grigory Zinoviev.

The essay first appeared in 1926 as the introductory lead item in the first edition of Problems of Leninism (Russian: Вопросы ленинизма, Voprosy leninizma), an assortment of Stalin's selected works that would evolve as the standard international collection of his writings. It appeared under separate covers early in 1926 and remained constantly in print throughout Stalin's reign as one of the Soviet leader's important theoretical works.

In this work Stalin identifies the Communist Party as the "main guiding force within the system of the dictatorship of the proletariat" and reaffirms the "possibility" of achieving socialist construction in one country alone through the control of state power by the working class and its vanguard party.

== Bibliographic history ==
On the Problems of Leninism (K voprosam leninizma) was an essay by Joseph Stalin signed January 25, 1926. According to a notation in the first edition, it was originally written "to serve as a preface to the collection of I.V. Stalin’s articles, Problems of Leninism," being published by the State Publishing House of Political Literature (Gosizdat). The essay was also published simultaneously under separate covers by Gozizdat in an edition of 25,000 copies.

The 1926 edition of this Stalin selected works volume first appeared in English in the Great Britain and the United States in 1928 as Leninism, with the translation by British communists Cedar and Eden Paul. This was taken to a second impression in both countries in 1932 without change, with On the Problems of Leninism still appearing as the introductory item.

After publication of a thick 9th Russian edition of Problems of Leninism, a new translation of On the Problems of Leninism appeared. This two-volume version of the Stalin selected works, still titled as Leninism and listing J. Fineberg as "Editor," contained a substantial amount of additional material, with On the Problems of Leninism appearing chronologically as the ninth item.

In the United States, On the Problem of Leninism first appeared under separate covers in 1934 as volume 32 of International Publishers' "Marxist Library" series. Confusingly, this thin hardcover was given the same name as would be used for the Stalin selected works collection after 1940, Problems of Leninism. The book was issued as an inexpensive paperback with the same translation in 1935.

After 1939 another version of On the Problems of Leninism came into the fold, one making the editorial decision to tendentiously remove the word "Comrade" when used in connection with Grigory Zinoviev and others deemed by the secret police to have been so-called "enemies of the people." Other than these silent ahistorical deletions, these later publications, including the version in the 13 volumes Stalin Works, follow the translation introduced by Fineberg in 1933.

== Historical context ==
Lenin suffered a set of incapacitating strokes in 1923, which led to his death in 1924. This ushered in an acute period of political infighting among the top leadership of the All-Russian Communist Party. Chief candidates as Lenin's successor included Leon Trotsky, head of the Red Army, Grigory Zinoviev, head of the Leningrad party organization and the Communist International, and Stalin, General Secretary of the Communist Party. All three of these rushed to demonstrate their ideological proficiency as Marxists to establish bona fides for top leadership.

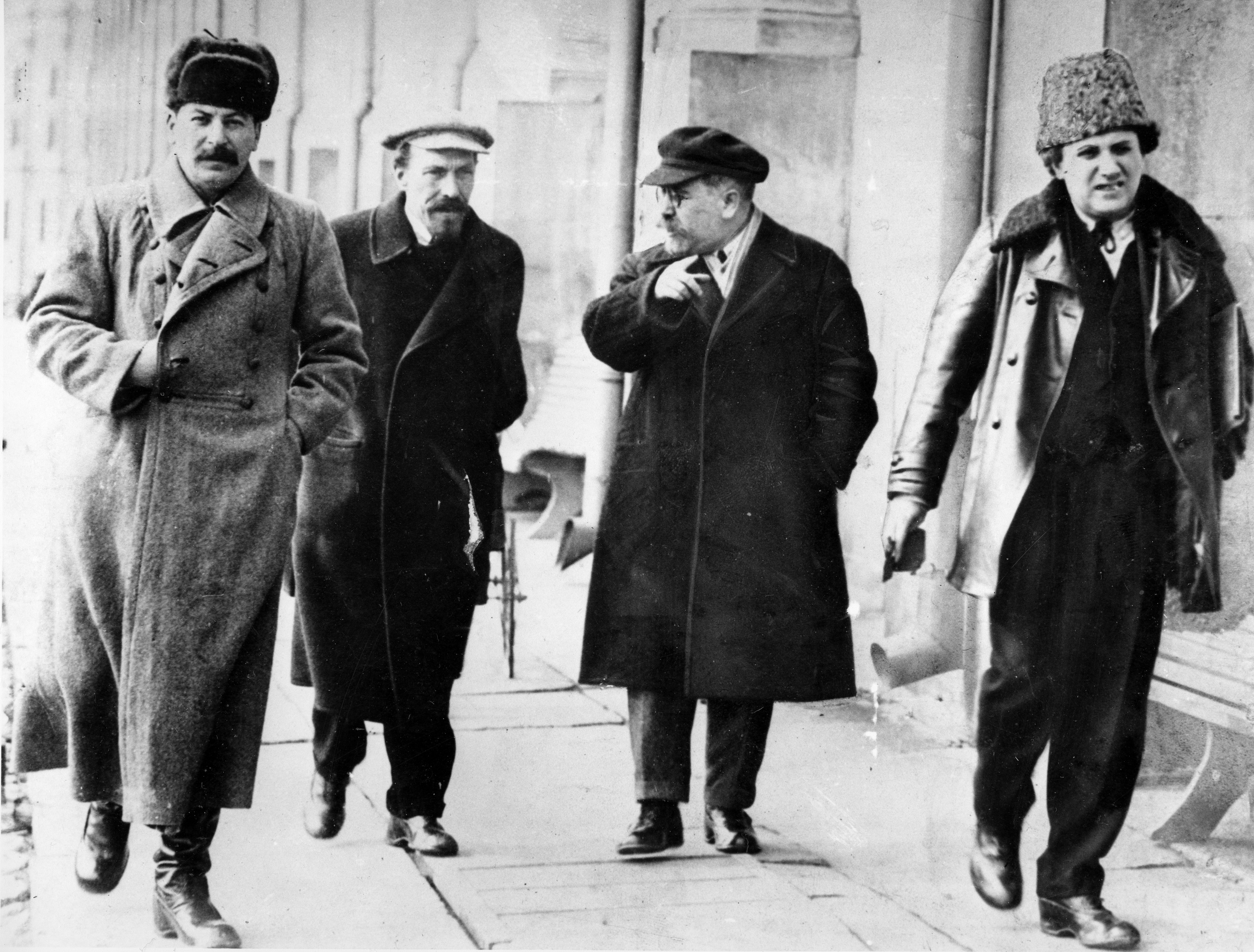
Stalin (L) and Zinoviev (R) with Alexei Rykov and Lev Kamenev.

Of the three main rivals, Stalin's output of analytical articles and pamphlets was the least prolific, and he moved to overcome the deficit early in 1924 with a speech in April to Sverdlov University, the Communist Party's main training school for functionaries. This speech, entitled "The Foundations of Leninism," was serialized in Pravda in April and May and released as a book under separate covers immediatedly after. This would become one of Stalin's most important works, reprinted and reissued in multiple languages throughout his life, with more than 17 million copies ultimately produced.

After this initial attempt to demonstrate his expertise in "Leninism," Stalin next took aim at Leon Trotsky with a pair of Pravda articles, "Trotskyism or Leninism?" and "The October Revolution and the Tasks of the Russian Communists," both of which enumerated the outsider Trotsky's long history of tactical disagreements with Lenin and the Bolsheviks and attempted to paint and —ism on his rival — so-called "Trotskyism". In this effort Stalin made common cause with Leningrad party boss Zinoviev and head of the Council of Labor and Defense (STO) Lev Kamenev, a dark-horse contender for power, publishing an anti-Trotsky anthology with them so as to concentrate their fire on their joint rival. In January 1925, Trotsky was forced out as People's Commissar of Defense and removed himself to the south for reasons of health, thereby changing the dynamics of the leadership struggle.

Zinoviev attempted to consolidate his position in the fall of 1925, drawing up a "platform of the four" with Kamenev, People's Commissar of Finance Grigory Sokolnikov, and Lenin's widow, Nadezhda Krupskaya. He followed this up with a manifesto of the leadership group entitled The Philosophy of an Epoch a few days later and a more substantial book, Leninism, shortly thereafter. Although the polemical targets of Leninism were primarily Stalin and his chief factional ally of the period, Pravda editor Nikolai Bukharin, neither were explicitly named in Zinoviev's attack. Nevertheless, the gloves were off between the two factional leaders, with Stalin and Bukharin offering a more market-friendly, pro-peasant spin on the New Economic Policy than Zinoviev, Kamenev, and Sokolnikov.

"On the Problems of Leninism" marked the next phase in Stalin's attempt to use Marxist doctrine to demonstrate intellectual superiority as a qualifying factor for party leadership, a polemical shot directed primarily at Zinoviev, now his chief rival. Stalin scholar Robert McNeal regards the long essay as "heavy artillery" wielded by Stalin against his foe, appearing not only as the introduction of his one volume selected works, Problems of Leninism, but as a pamphlet and a magazine article, with a section gaining even broader circulation in the pages of the party's official newspaper, Pravda.

In a 1988 book, McNeal observed:

"Sensing that he was in a strong position, he did not alter the main line of his argument, aprart from changing the name of the enemy from Trotsky to Zinoviev, with a few mentions of Kamenev as well.... As usual the debate was couched not in terms of Stalin versus his opponent but of that oppositionist against 'Leninism' and 'the party,' which Stalin claimed (with some exaggeration) had endorsed 'socialism in one country'... All of this was backed by an increased volume of direct quotations from Lenin, counterbalancing Zinoviev's efforts to establish mastery in that scholastic occupation."

Working in tandem with Bukharin, Stalin steadily edged into a position of control of the party apparatus, with Zinoviev and Kamenev ultimately joining with Trotsky in the fall of 1926 as a "United Opposition."

== Synopsis ==
On the Problems of Leninism is divided into seven brief sections, each titled and numbered with Roman numerals.

Section I is entitled "Definition of Leninism," in which Stalin reviews and affirms his definition put forward in the 1924 pamphlet, The Foundations of Leninism. Stalin declares "Leninism" to be "Marxism of the era of imperialism and of the proletarian revolution.... [T]he theory and tactics of the proletarian revolution in general, the theory and tactics of the dictatorship of the proletariat in particular."

This is pointedly contrasted to Grigory Zinoviev's definition of "Leninism" as "Marxism in the epoch of imperialist war and of the world revolution which began directly in a country where the peasanty predominates." Stalin accused his rival of thereby reducing Leninism to a Russian concoction rather than a universalistic international doctrine, playing into the hands of democratic socialist leaders such as Karl Kautsky and Otto Bauer, who likewise believed Bolshevik tactics to be uniquely Russian.

In Section II, "The Core of Leninism," Stalin returned again to his Foundations of Leninism to reemphasize that "the fundamental thing in Leninism" was "the question of the dictatorship of the proletariat, of the conditions under which it can be won, of the conditions in which it can be consodilated." The matter of the peasant nature of Russia is a matter of secondary importance, Stalin indicates.

This is again contrasted to the position of Zinoviev, Stalin's main rival for power, whom Stalin quotes as saying "the role of the peasantry is the fundamental question of Bolshevism, of Leninism."

Section III, headed "The Question of 'Permanent' Revolution" is addressed, without mentioning his name, to the ideas of another of Stalin's rivals for power, Leon Trotsky, and his co-thinkers. While allowing that Lenin believed in the uninterrupted transition from bourgeois to socialist revolution, the "Russian 'permanentists'" underestimated both the revolutionary capacity of the peasantry and the strength and ability of Russian industrial workers.

Here again Stalin appeals to the authority of Lenin, providing lengthy quotations from 1905 to support his assertion that "the idea of the bourgeois-democratic revolution growing into the socialist revolution" was "propounded by Lenin as long ago as 1905."

In Section IV, "The Proletarian Revolution and the Dictatorship of the Proletariat," Stalin enumerates five "basic points" distinguishing bourgeois (democratic) revolution from proletarian (socialist) revolution. Stalin characterizes the former as a brief seizure of power accompanied by continued operation of the same economic system, merely "substituting one set of exploiters by another in the seat of power;" the bourgeois democratic revolutionary state is therefore asserted to without the ability to maintain the ongoing support of the working class or to have the capacity to "destroy the old state machine."

On the other hand, Stalin asserts, the proletarian revolution "can and must" rally "the millions of toiling and exploited masses" to demolish the old government apparatus and construct a new socialist economy. In making his argument Stalin makes a heavy appeal to the writings of Lenin, marshalling multiple long quotations, including one nearly a printed page and a half in length.

Section V, entitled "The Party and the Working Class Within the System of the Dictatorship of the Proletariat," the longest chapter of the book, turns to what Stalin calls the "belts," "levers," and "directing force" of the revolutionary government. These are again mechanically enumerated, including the trade unions, the soviets, the cooperative societies, the Young Communist League, and finally "the Party of the proletariat, its vanguard."

"Only the party of the proletariat, only the party of the Communists, is capable of fulfilling this role of chief leader in the system of the dictatorship of the proletariat," Stalin declares, identifying the Communist Party as the "main guiding force within the system of the dictatorship of the proletariat." This notion of a vanguard party marks one of the core concepts of Communism, distinguishing it from the unbending parliamentary democratic orientation of Social Democracy.

Stalin again appeals to Lenin as a source of axiomatic authority in asserting:

"Here in the Soviet Union, in the land of the dictatorship of the proletariat, the fact that not a single important political or organizational question is decided by our Soviet and other mass organisations without directions from the Party must be regarded as the highest expression of the leadinf role of the Party. In this sense, it coul be said that the dictatorship of the proletariat is in essence the 'dictatorship' of its vanguard, the 'dictatorship' of its Party, as the main guiding force of the proletariat."

Having attempted to demonstrate his theoretical mastery in contradistinction to Zinoviev, Trotsky, and Kamenev, in Section VI Stalin turns to "The Question of the Victory of Socialism in a Single Country." Stalin first revisits his two 1924 pamphlets — Foundations of Leninism and The October Revolution and the Tactics of the Russian Communists — in taking aim at "the assertion made by the critics of Leninism, against the Trotskyists, who declared that the dictatorship of the proletariat in a single country 'could not hold out against conservative Europe,' in the absence of victory in all lands."

Stalin here emphasizes the "possibility" of achieving a victory of socialism in the Soviet Union alone by "solving the contradictions between the workers and the peasants" with the working class (and implicitly the Communist Party) taking the lead "with the sympathy and support of the workers of other countries" even if those countries failed to achieve a "preliminary victory of the proletarian revolution." He again takes aim at Zinoviev, declaring that his defeatism on this matter followed an inherent logic of "capitulation to the capitalist elements of our economy."

== See also ==
- Joseph Stalin bibliography
