= Our Immediate Task =

1899 writing by Vladimir Lenin

"Our Immediate Task" is an 1899 writing by Russian philosopher and revolutionary Vladimir Lenin. The article was a rebuttal to proponents of economism. The South African newspaper Independent Online cited the work with reference to contemporary socialist movements in South Africa.
