= List of speeches given by Vladimir Lenin =

This is a list of speeches of Vladimir Lenin, the founder and leader of both Soviet Russia (1917–1924) and Soviet Union (1922–1924).

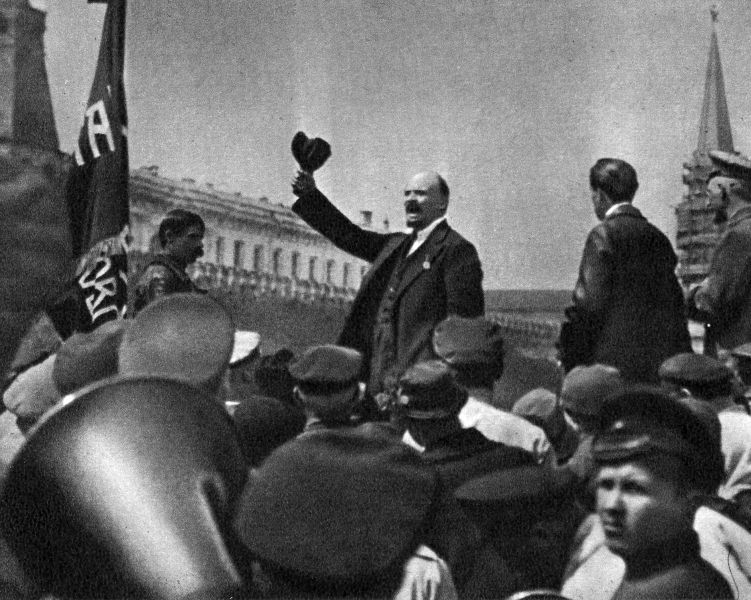
Lenin, speaking for the public in 1919

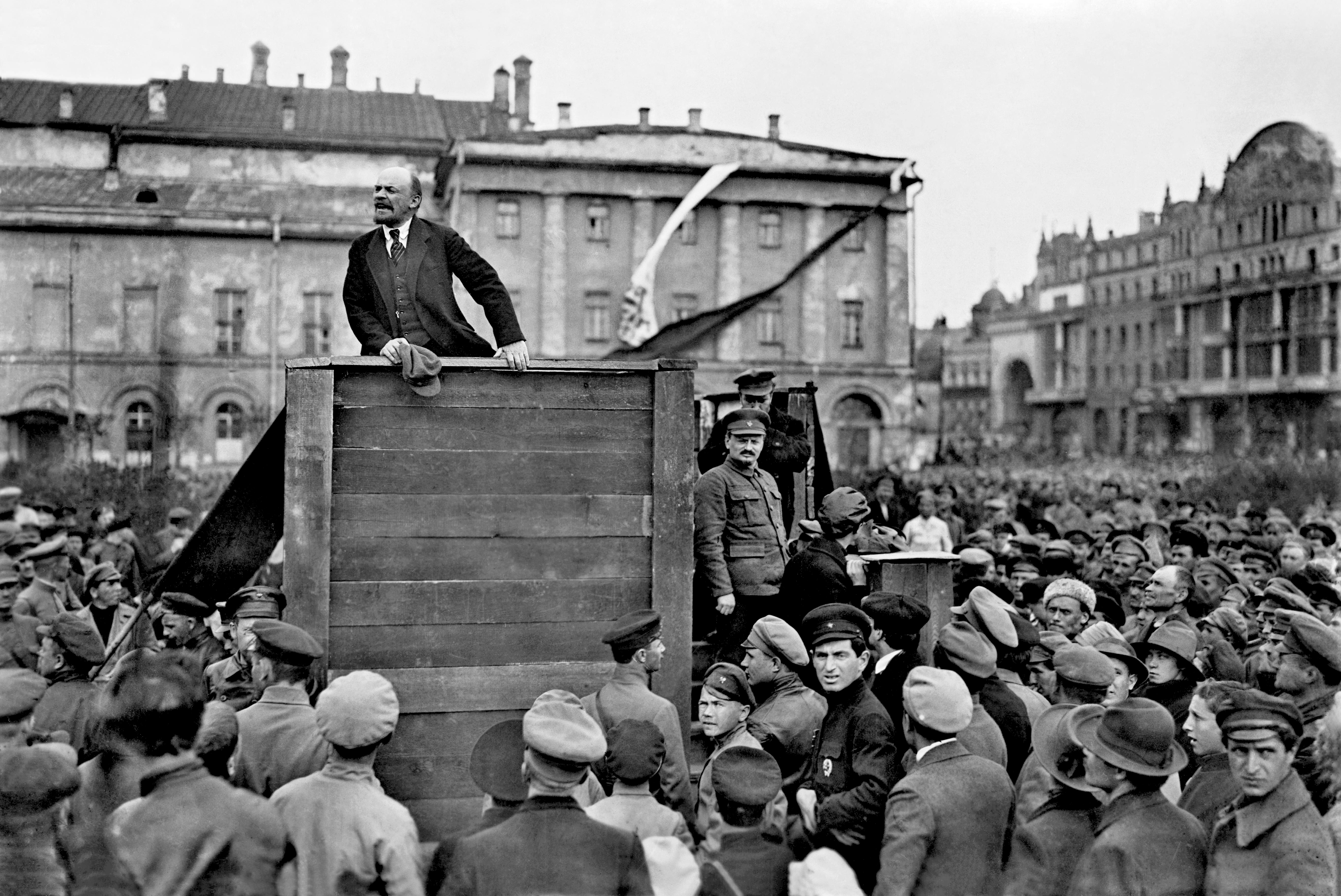
Vladimir Lenin speech in Moscow on May 5, 1920

Lenin Giving a Speech to a Crowd in 1917

== Recorded ==
A list of Lenin speeches between 1919 and 1921 recorded via gramophone.

No	Matrix #	No of recording session / Place	Speech	Date	Transcript	Listen
1	A-001	1st session / Tsentropechat	In Memory of Comrade Yakov Mikhailovich Sverdlov	19-Mar-1919	English	Record
2	A-002	1st session / Tsentropechat	The Third, Communist International	19-Mar-1919	Russian	Record
3	A-003	1st session / Tsentropechat	An Appeal to the Red Army, part I	19-Mar-1919	English	Record
4	A-004	1st session / Tsentropechat	An Appeal to the Red Army, part II	19-Mar-1919	English	Record
5	A-005	2nd session / Kremlin	Anti-Jewish Pogroms	23-Mar-1919	Russian	Record
6	A-006	2nd session / Kremlin	What Is Soviet Power?	23-Mar-1919	English	Record
7	A-007	2nd session / Kremlin	Communication On The Wireless Negotiations With Béla Kun	23-Mar-1919	English	Record
8	A-008	3rd session / Kremlin	The Middle Peasants	23-Mar-1919	Refer to Lenin Collected Works, vol. 29, "Speeches on Gramophone Records"	Record
9	А-0227-1	4th session / Kremlin	About Transport, 1st variant with a slip of tongue	05-Apr-1920	Russian	Record
10	А-0227-2	4th session / Kremlin	About Transport	05-Apr-1920	Russian	Record
11	А-0228	4th session / Kremlin	About Work Discipline	05-Apr-1920	Russian	Record
12	А-0229	4th session / Kremlin	How the Working People Can Be Saved from the Oppression of the Landowners and Capitalists for Ever	05-Apr-1920	English	Record
13	Never been assigned		About Soviet power or About Polish Front - a conventional name; allegedly the matrix was damaged during copying	05-Apr-1920	The speech has never been published	
14	А-0288	5th session / Tsentropechat	The Tax In Kind	25-Apr-1921	Refer to Lenin Collected Works, vol. 35, "Recorded Speeches"	The recording has not been found, only the manuscript has survived
15	А-0289	5th session / Tsentropechat	About Natural Tax	25-Apr-1921	Russian	Record
16	А-0290	5th session / Tsentropechat	Consumer and trade cooperation	25-Apr-1921	Refer to Lenin Collected Works, vol. 35, "Recorded Speeches"	Record
17	А-0291	5th session / Tsentropechat	Concessions and the development of capitalism	25-Apr-1921	Refer to Lenin Collected Works, vol. 35, "Recorded Speeches"	Record
18	А-0292	5th session / Tsentropechat	Non-party men and Soviet Power	25-Apr-1921	Russian	Record
