= Two Tactics of Social Democracy in the Democratic Revolution =

Book by Vladimir Lenin

Two Tactics of Social Democracy in the Democratic Revolution is one of Lenin's early writings.

== Background ==
It was written in June and July 1905, while the Russian Revolution of 1905 was taking place. The work sets out the fundamental differences that emerged between the Bolsheviks and the Mensheviks. At the Third Congress of the Russian Social Democratic Labour Party, held in London, the Mensheviks did not take part, preferring to hold their own conference. Lenin explains the decisions taken at the Congress, and at the same time examines the political positions taken by Julius Martov and his companions at the Menshevik conference held in Geneva, criticizing them in order to reveal the line to follow in order to assume the leadership of a class-conscious proletariat.

Lenin's revolutionary theory is the theory of "uninterrupted revolution": "From the democratic revolution we will immediately begin, to the extent of our strength, the strength of the class-conscious and organized proletariat, to pass to the socialist revolution. We are for the uninterrupted revolution. We will not stop halfway."

== Content ==
Lenin's preface poses a certain question: "in educating and organising the working class;...where should we place the main political emphasis in this work of education and organisation? On the trade unions and legally existing associations, or on an insurrection, on the work of creating a revolutionary army and a revolutionary government?"

== See also ==
- The State and Revolution
