= One Step Forward, Two Steps Back =

1904 book by Vladimir Lenin

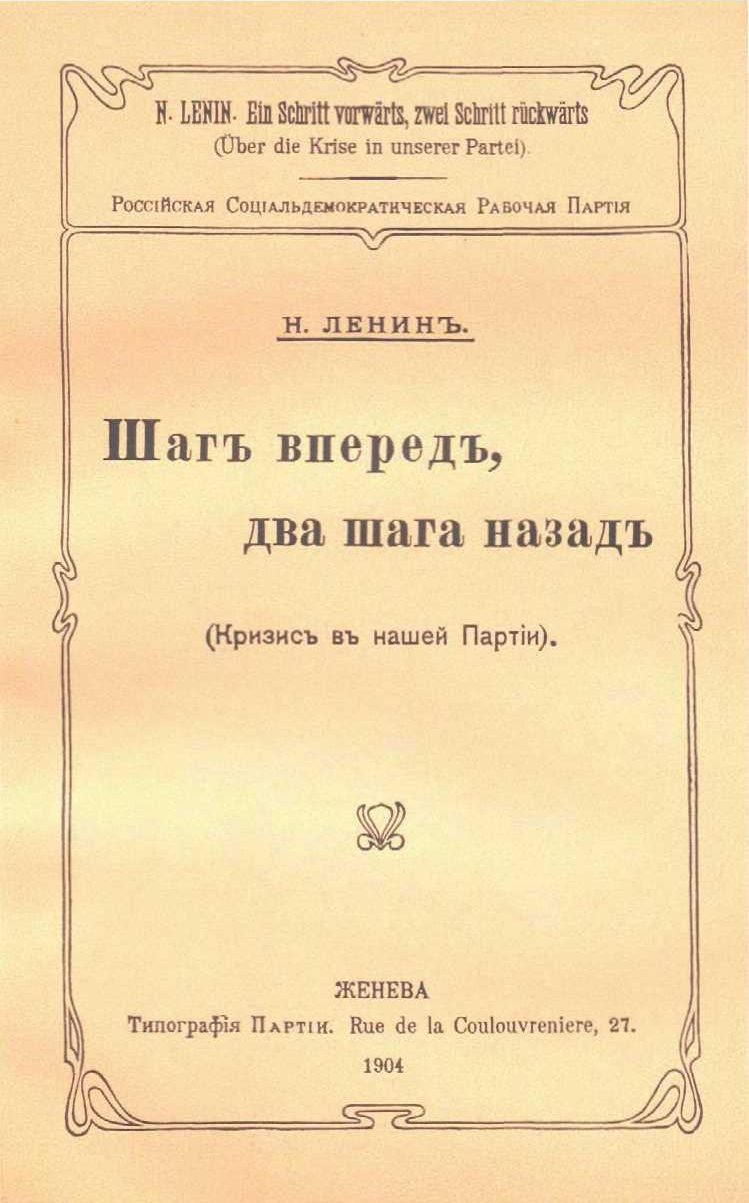
- Cover of 1904 edition
- Author: Vladimir Lenin
- Original title: Шаг вперёд, два шага назад (Кризис в нашей партии)
- Language: Russian
- Genre: Non-fiction
- Publication date: May 1904

One Step Forward, Two Steps Back: The Crisis in Our Party (Russian: Шаг вперёд, два шага назад (Кризис в нашей партии), romanized: Shag vperyod, dva shaga nazad (Krizis v nashey partii)) is a work written by Vladimir Lenin and published on May 6/19, 1904. In it Lenin defends his role in the 2nd Congress of the Russian Social Democratic Labour Party, held in Brussels and London from July 30 to August 23, 1903. Lenin examines the circumstances that resulted in a split within the party between a Bolshevik ("majority") faction, led by himself, and a Menshevik ("minority") faction, led by Julius Martov.

== Synopsis ==
Written in 1904 in response to controversies within the Social Democratic Labour Party's Second Congress regarding the status of party membership and organization, Lenin frames this conflicting factionalism within the Party in terms of dialectics. According to Lenin, there are two conflicting factions within the party: "the revolutionaries", which consists of the majority of party members (the Bolsheviks) and "the opportunists", which are the minority (the Mensheviks).

== Response ==
Rosa Luxemburg, a Marxist living in Germany at the time, responded to the article in Organizational Questions of the Russian Social Democracy (1904). She criticized Lenin's attitude towards democratic centralism and wrote about the role of "spontaneity" among the working class. However, different authors make varying claims about her precise attitude towards Lenin, the Bolshevik faction and the revolutionary situation in Russia.

== See also ==
- Vladimir Lenin bibliography
