= List of members of the Russian Constituent Assembly =

This is a list of the All-Russian Constituent Assembly members, elected in 1917.

== Archival materials and literature ==
Per electoral law, 815 members of the Constituent Assembly should have been elected (735 from civilian constituencies, 80 from military constituencies). But 1917 Constituent Assembly election took place in midst of war and revolution, and was never carried out to completion - at the time of the sole session of the Constituent Assembly in January 1918 election results were missing from some constituencies whilst some constituencies had yet to hold a vote. In 1930 a team of Soviet historians compiled a listing of elected deputies of the Constituent Assembly, presented in the book Vserossiĭskoe uchreditelʹnoe sobranie. However, they subdivided their listing in two categories based on the level of corroboration possible - a 'general list' with 601 names (with a high degree of corroboration of different sources) and an 'additional list' with 106 names (with a lower degree of corroboration of source material).

Three key documents were used to compile the general list - a list of 499 names compiled by the office of the Electoral Commission (based on telegram reports from District Electoral Commissions), a handwritten list of 463 names of elected deputies that were registered as Constituent Assembly members (with certifications and other documents issued by District Electoral Commissions as attachments) and a list of 237 names of members of the Socialist-Revolutionary faction in the Constituent Assembly. These three sources have a high degree of overlap, except 5 names of SR deputies that only appear in the latter document. Per the authors of the 1930 work on the Constituent Assembly, they had encountered additional corroboration in archives and documents for each of the 601 deputies on the 'general list'.

== Altai ==
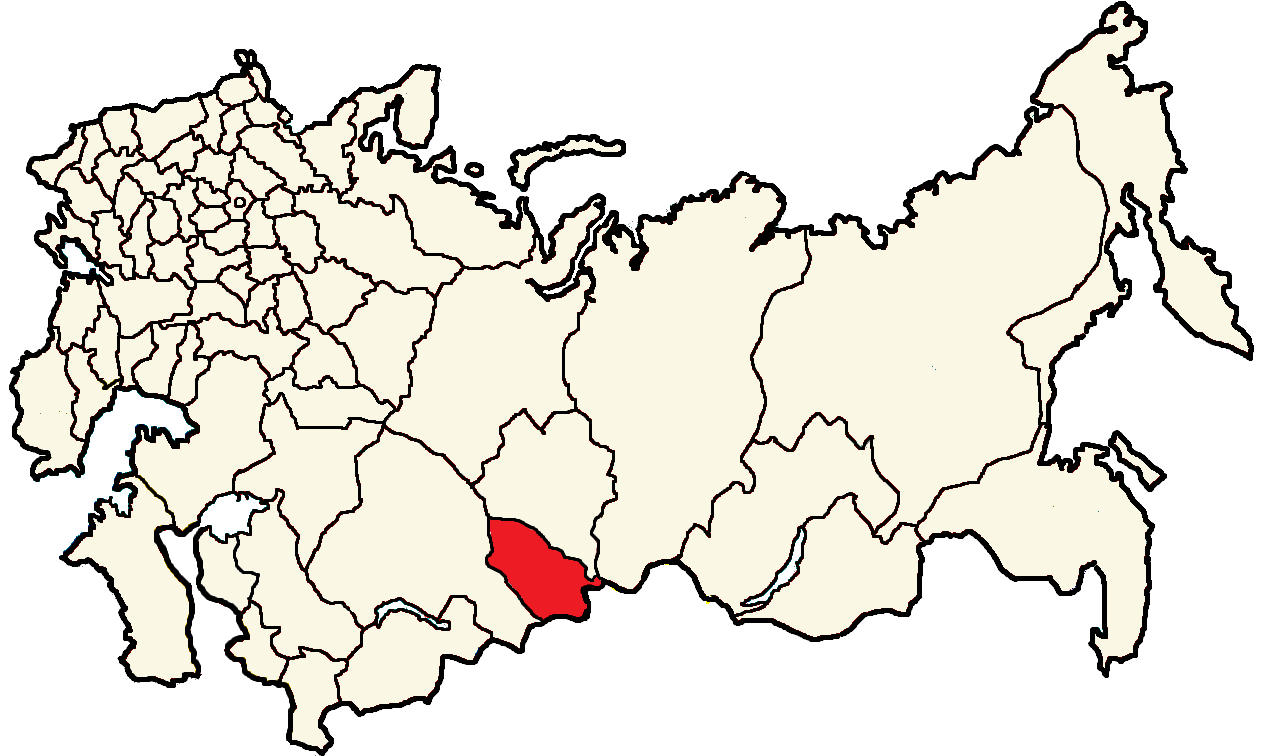
Altai electoral district

- Aleksei Devizorov (Socialist Revolutionary Party)/Council of peasant deputies
- Ivan Krivorotov (Socialist Revolutionary Party)/Council of peasant deputies
- Mendel Levin (Socialist Revolutionary Party)/Council of peasant deputies
- Valentin Lomshakov (Socialist Revolutionary Party)/Council of peasant deputies
- Nikolai Liubimov (Socialist Revolutionary Party)/Council of peasant deputies
- Konstantin Ramazanov (Socialist Revolutionary Party)/Council of peasant deputies
- Yevgeniy Rogovskiy (Socialist Revolutionary Party)/Council of peasant deputies
- Vadim Rudnev (Socialist Revolutionary Party)/Council of peasant deputies
- Ivan Sotnin (Socialist Revolutionary Party)/Council of peasant deputies
- Akindin Shaposhnikov (Socialist Revolutionary Party)/Council of peasant deputies
- Daniil Shnyrev (Socialist Revolutionary Party)/Council of peasant deputies
- Pavel Kosorotov (Socialist Revolutionary Party)/Council of peasant deputies
- Mikhail Shatilov (Socialist Revolutionary Party)/Council of peasant deputies

== Arkhangelsk ==
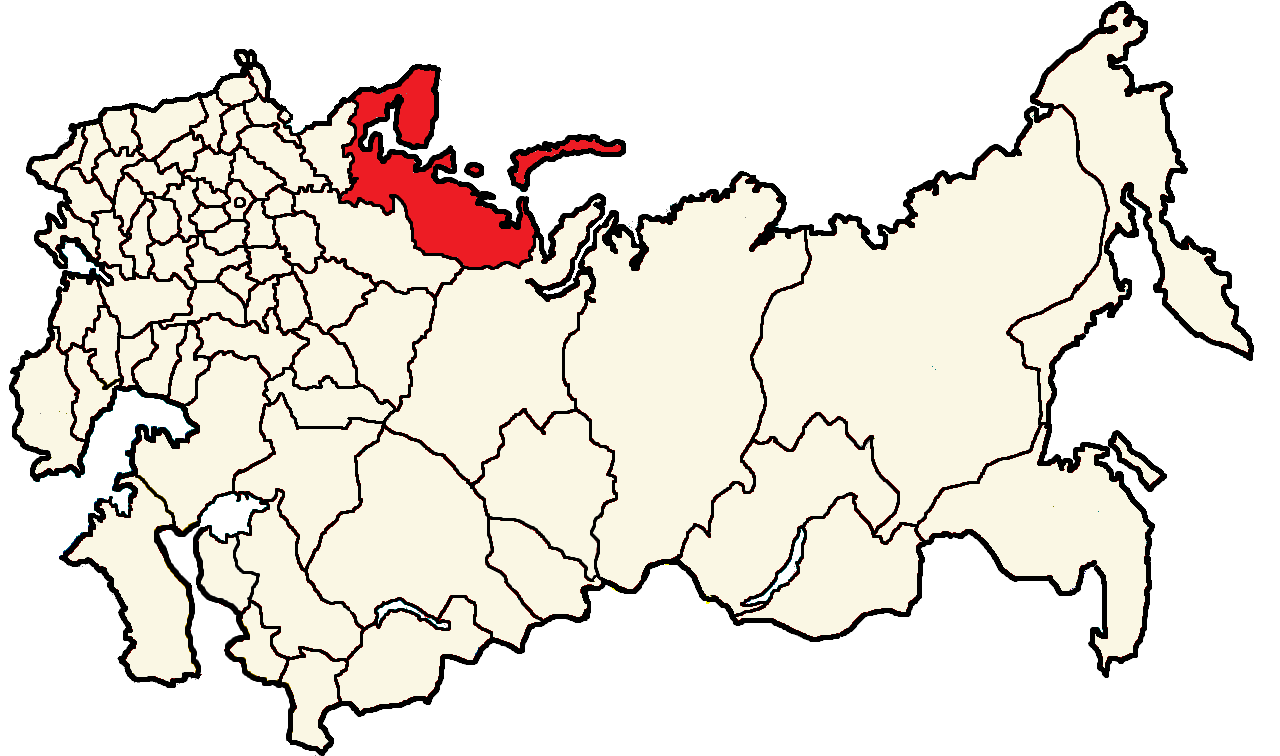
Arkhangelsk electoral district

- Aleksei Ivanov (Socialist Revolutionary Party)/Council of peasant deputies
- Mikhail Kviatkovskiy (Socialist Revolutionary Party)/Council of peasant deputies

== Astrakhan ==
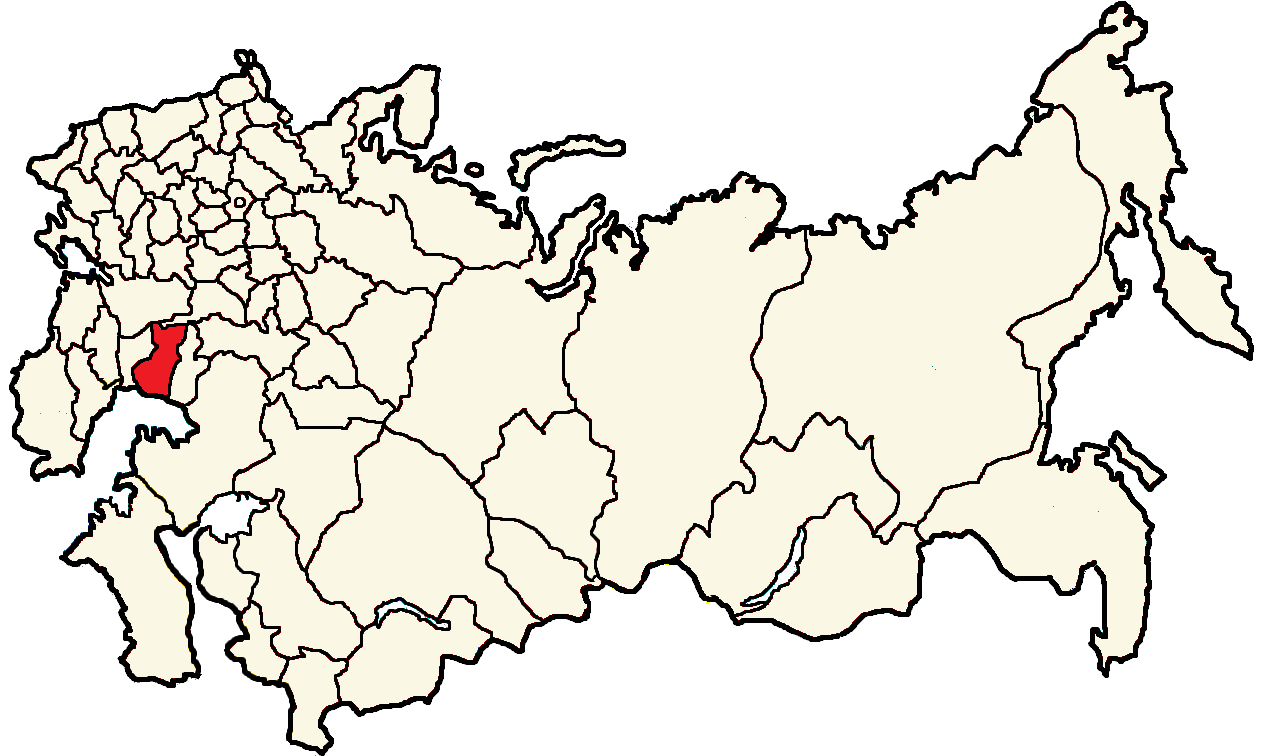
Astrakhan electoral district

- Ivan Nezhintsev (Socialist Revolutionary Party)/Council of peasant deputies
- Kuzma Tereschenko (Socialist Revolutionary Party)/Council of peasant deputies
- Aleksandr Trusov (Bolsheviks)
- Fatikh Usmanov (Muslim)
- Vera Figner (Socialist Revolutionary Party)/Council of peasant deputies

== Bessarabia ==
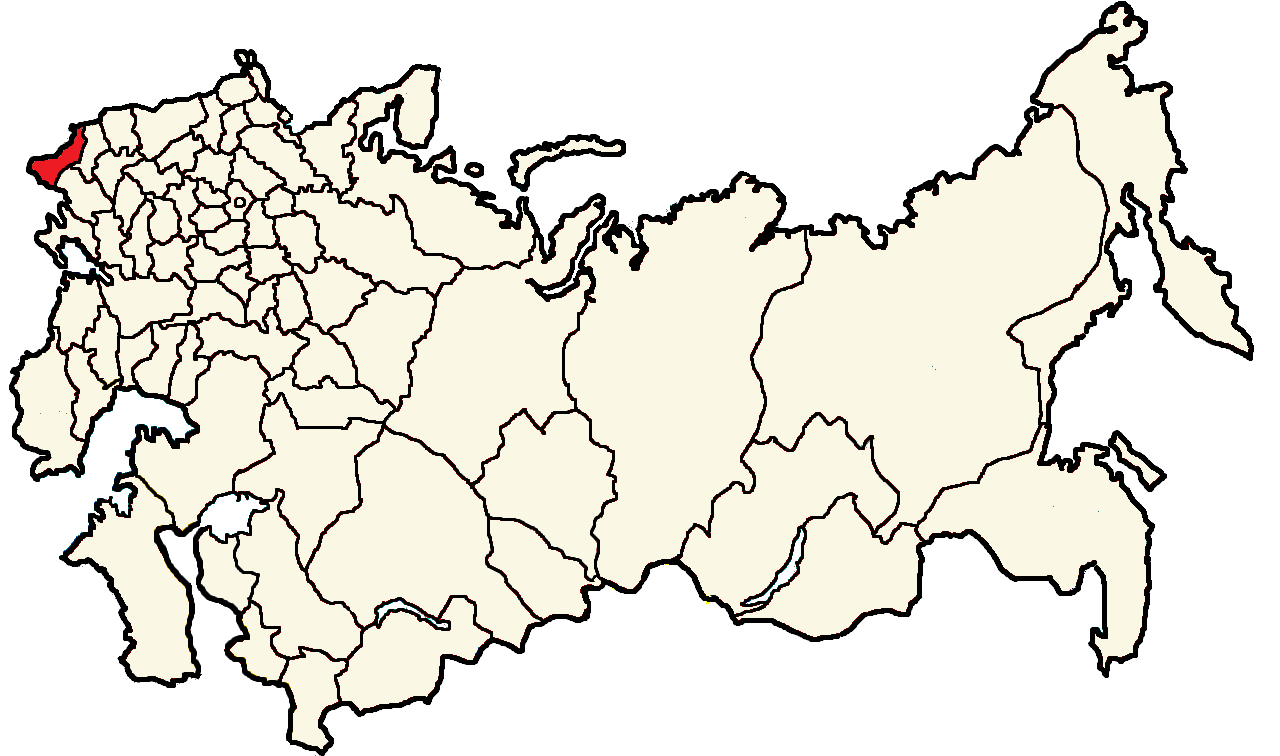
Bessarabia electoral district

- Aleksandr Aleksandrov (Socialist Revolutionary Party)
- Ion Inculeț Council of peasant deputies
- Trefiliy Katoros Council of peasant deputies
- Vasiliy Rudyev Council of peasant deputies
- Mark Slonim (Socialist Revolutionary Party)
- Konstantin Sukhovykh (Socialist Revolutionary Party)
- Lev Sukhovykh (Socialist Revolutionary Party)
- Pantelimon Erhan Council of peasant deputies
- Israil Imas (Socialist Revolutionary Party)
- Feodosiy Kozhokar Council of peasant deputies
- Girsh Lurie (Mensheviks-united and Bund)
- Sergey Urusov (National Freedom)
- Boris Avilov (Internationalists)
- Yakov Bernstein-Kogan (Jewish National Electoral Committee)
- Afanasiy Mekhonoshin (Socialist Revolutionary Party)
- Hilarion Stepanov Council of peasant deputies

== Caspian ==
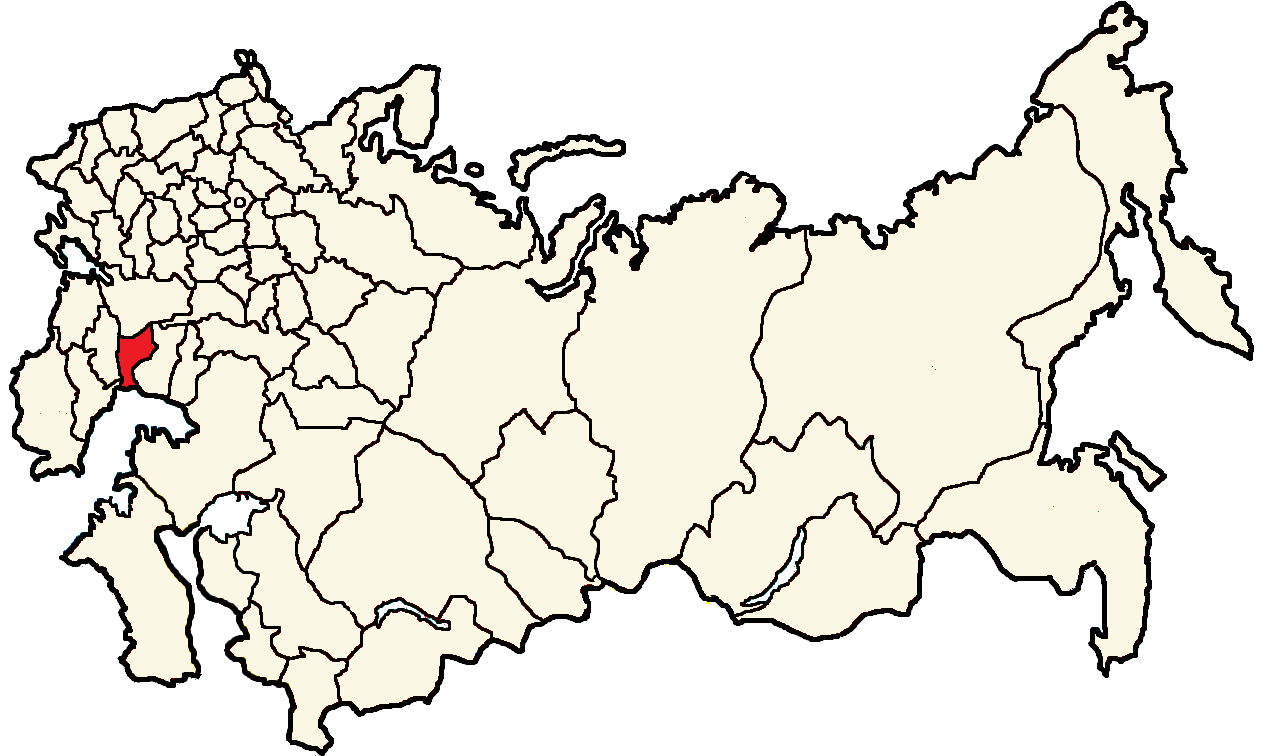
Caspian electoral district

- Sandzhi Bayanov

== Chernigov ==
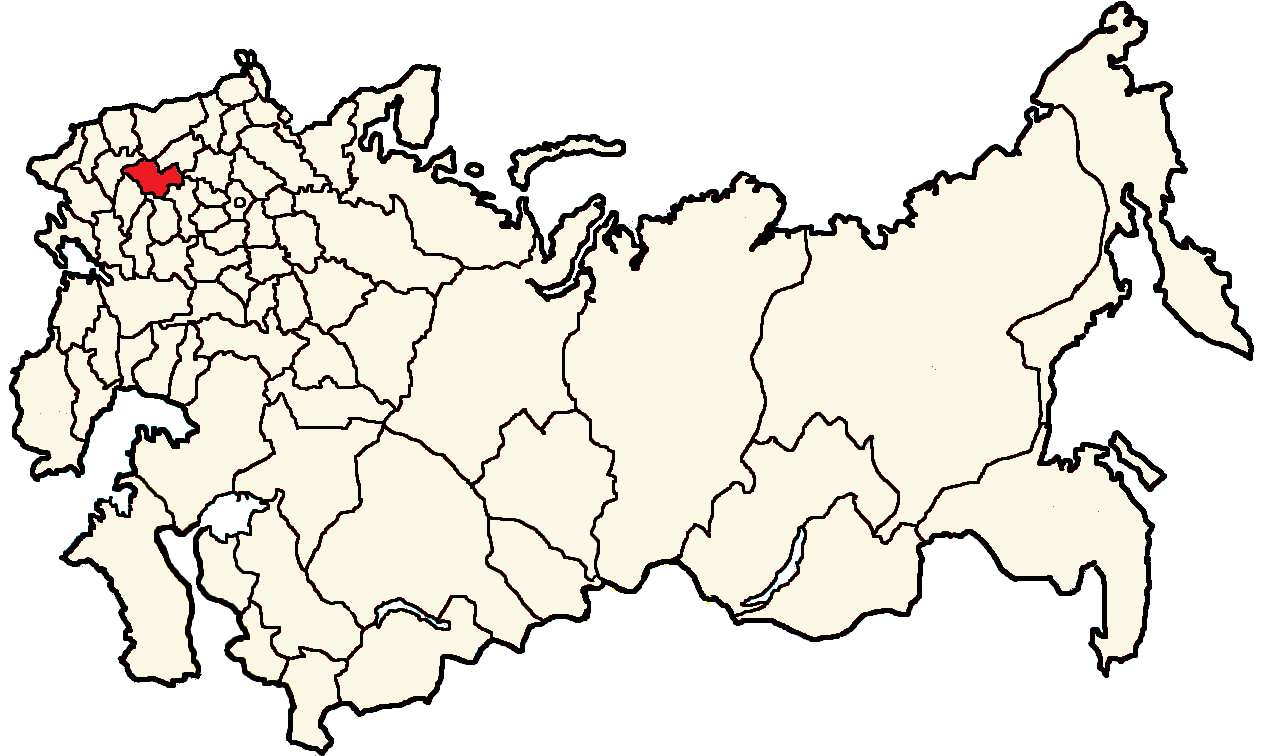
Chernigov electoral district

- Yevgenia Bosch (Bolsheviks)
- Catherine Breshkovsky (Socialist Revolutionary Party)
- Ippolit Kovalevskyi (Ukrainian Socialist Revolutionary Party, Ukrainian Peasant Union)
- Tyt Kovbasa (Ukrainian Socialist Revolutionary Party, Ukrainian Peasant Union)
- Vasyl Kostenetskyi (Ukrainian Socialist Revolutionary Party, Ukrainian Peasant Union)
- Viacheslav Lashkevych (Ukrainian Socialist Revolutionary Party, Ukrainian Peasant Union)
- Feodor Motora (Bolsheviks)
- Havrylo Odynets (Ukrainian Socialist Revolutionary Party, Ukrainian Peasant Union)
- Georgy Pyatakov (Bolsheviks)
- Adrian Ryndich (Bolsheviks)
- Mykola Sayenko (Ukrainian Socialist Revolutionary Party, Ukrainian Peasant Union)
- Mykyta Shapoval (Ukrainian Socialist Revolutionary Party, Ukrainian Peasant Union)
- Mykola Shrah (Ukrainian Socialist Revolutionary Party, Ukrainian Peasant Union)
- Andriy Kuzmenko (Ukrainian Socialist Revolutionary Party, Ukrainian Peasant Union)

== Chinese Eastern Railway ==
- Nikolai Strelkov (Mensheviks united)

== Don ==
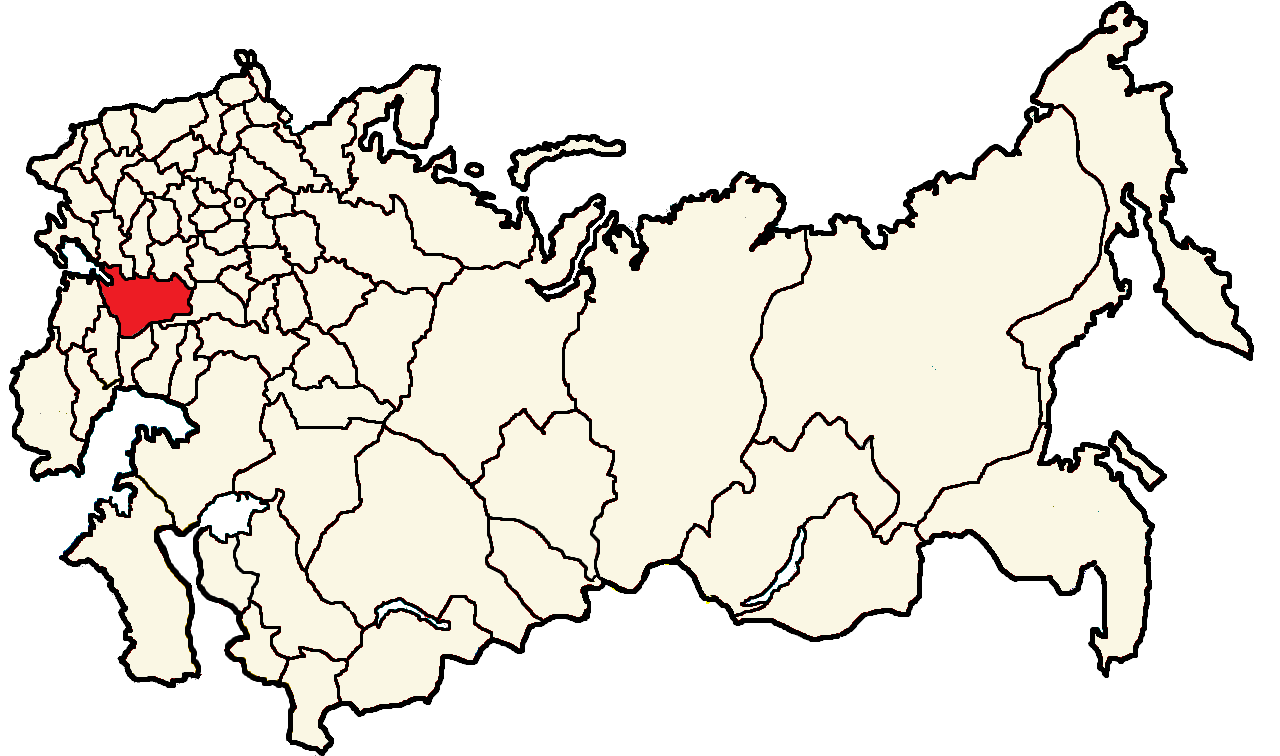
Don Cossack Region electoral district

- Sergei Shvetsov (Socialist Revolutionary Party)
- Pavel Ageyev (Cossacks)
- Mikhail Arakantsev (Cossacks)
- Boris Babin (Socialist Revolutionary Party)
- Mitrofan Bogayevskiy (Cossacks)
- Semeon Vasilchenko (Bolsheviks)
- Mitrofan Voronkov (Cossacks)
- Alexey Kaledin (Cossacks)
- Kuzma Kolesnikov (Socialist Revolutionary Party)
- Venedikt Kurilov (Socialist Revolutionary Party)
- Solomon Lozovsky (Bolsheviks)
- Valerian Mamonov (Socialist Revolutionary Party)
- Nikolai Melnikov (Cossacks)
- Aleksandr Nikolayev (Socialist Revolutionary Party)
- Pavel Nikolskiy (Socialist Revolutionary Party)
- Aleksei Popov (Cossacks)
- Sergey Syrtsov (Bolsheviks)
- Badma Ulanov (Cossacks)
- Vasily Kharlamov (Cossacks)

== Estonia ==
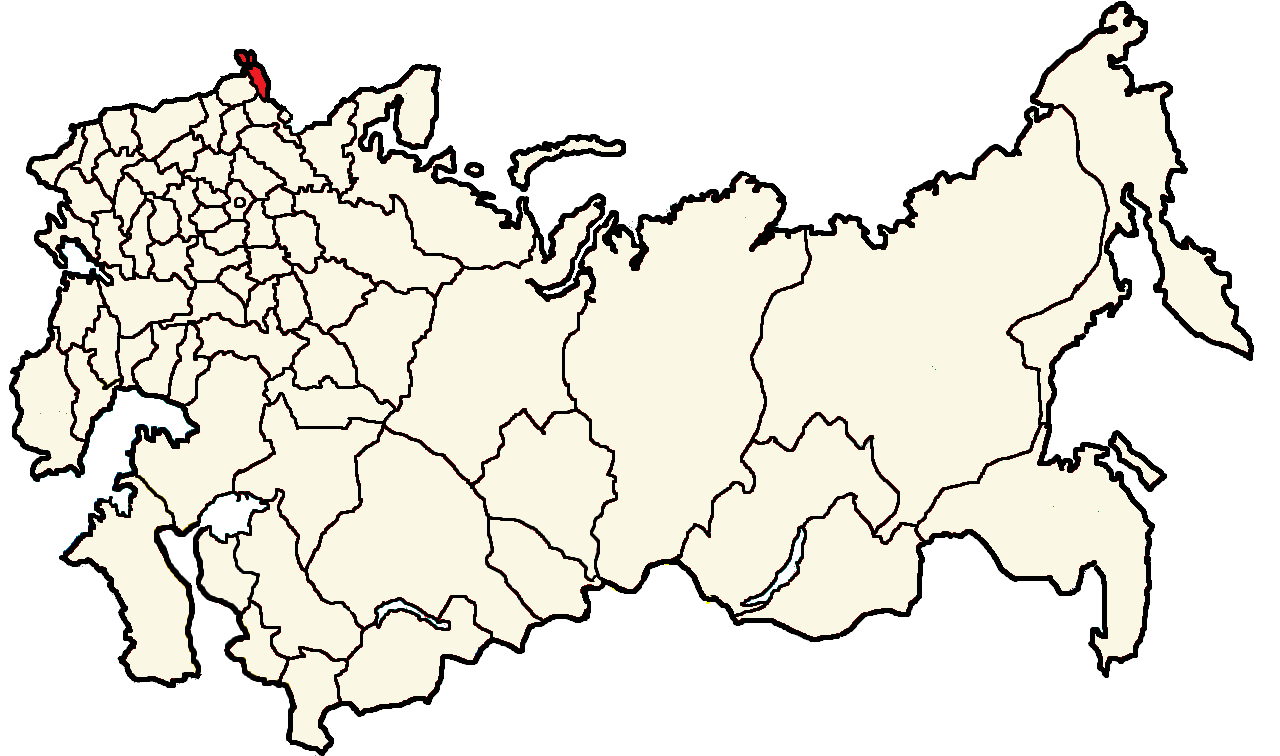
Estonia electoral district

- Jaan Anvelt (Bolsheviks)/Executive Committee of landless or small estate peasantry
- Rudolf Vakmann (Bolsheviks)/Executive Committee of landless or small estate peasantry
- Jüri Vilms (Estonian Labour Party)
- Hans Pöögelmann (Bolsheviks)/Executive Committee of landless or small estate peasantry
- Jaan Poska (Estonian Democratic bloc)
- Ivan Rabtšinski (Bolsheviks)/Executive Committee of landless or small estate peasantry
- Julius Seljamaa (Estonian Labour Party)
- Jaan Tõnisson (Estonian Democratic bloc)

== Fergana ==
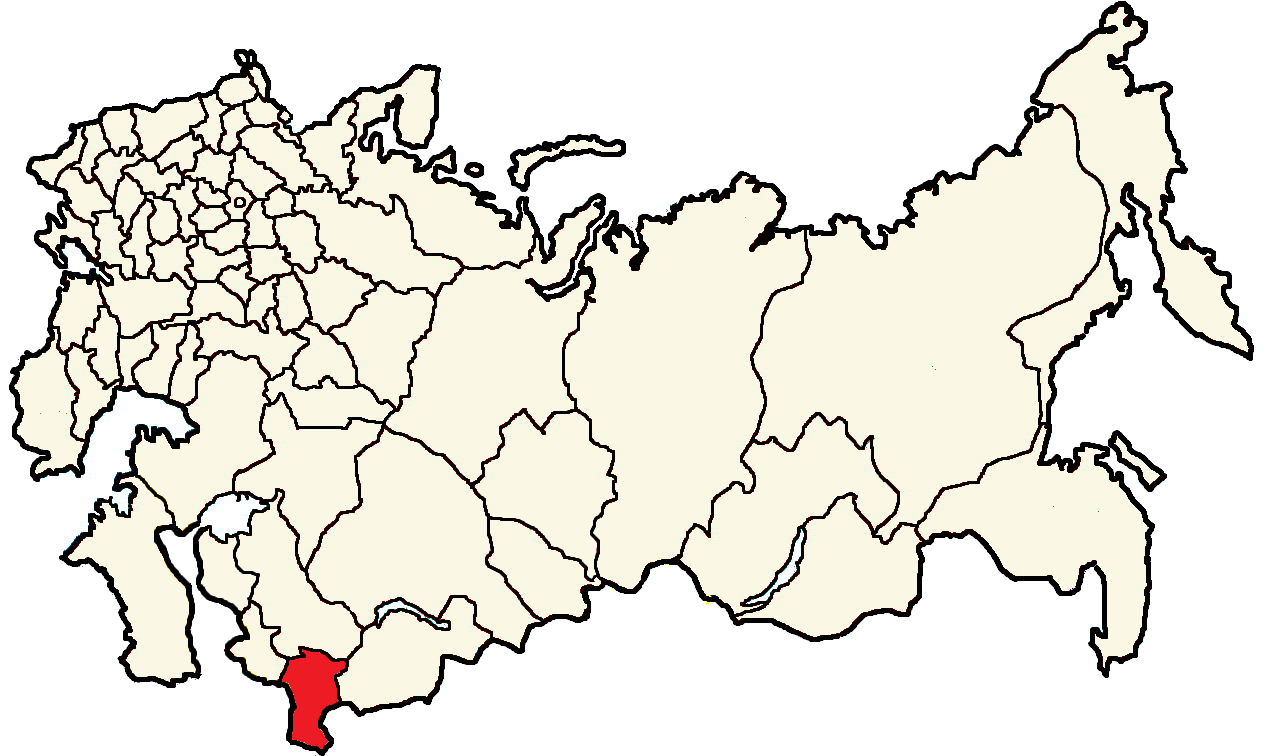
Fergana electoral district

- Vadim Chaykin (All-Fergana)
- Mir Adil Mirza-Axmedov (All-Fergana)
- Mustafa Shokay (All-Fergana)
- Shax-Islam Shahiaxmedov (All-Fergana)
- Xudontbey Mahomed Urguli-Agaev (All-Fergana)
- Sarykbey Akaev (All-Fergana)
- Nasyrxan Tiuriaev (Muinil-Islam Society)
- Abdurakhmanbey Urazaev (All-Fergana)
- Kadyr Xodjaev (Muinil-Islam Society)
- Qori Yoʻldosh Poʻlatov (All-Fergana)

== Horde ==
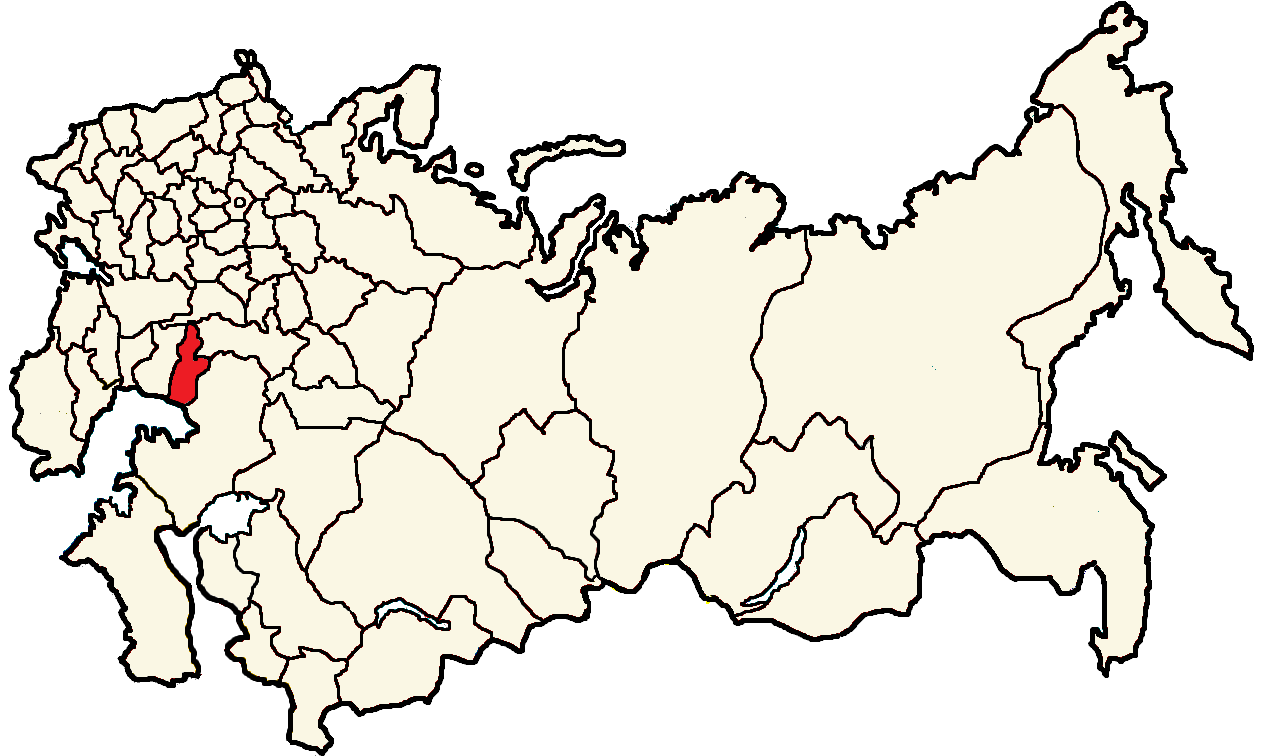
Horde electoral district

- Baxtigirey Kulmanov (Alash)
- Validkhan Tanachev (Alash)

== Irkutsk ==
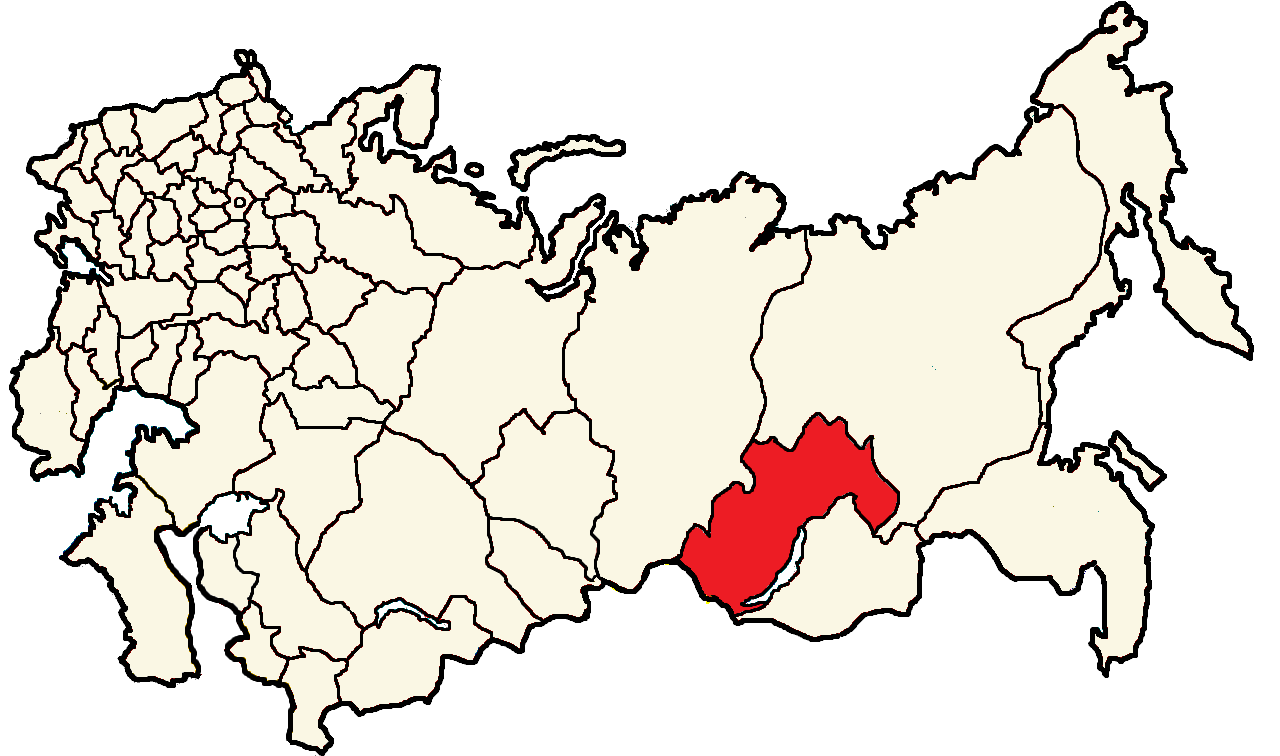
Irkutsk electoral district

- Konstantin Korshunov (Socialist Revolutionary Party)/All-Russian Peasant Union
- Yevgeni Timofeyev (Socialist Revolutionary Party)/All-Russian Peasant Union
- Baerton Vampilun (Buriat Nationals)
- Nikolai Gavrilov (Social-Democrats Bolsheviks / Mensheviks-Internationalists)
- Moisei Krol (Socialist Revolutionary Party)/All-Russian Peasant Union

== Kaluga ==
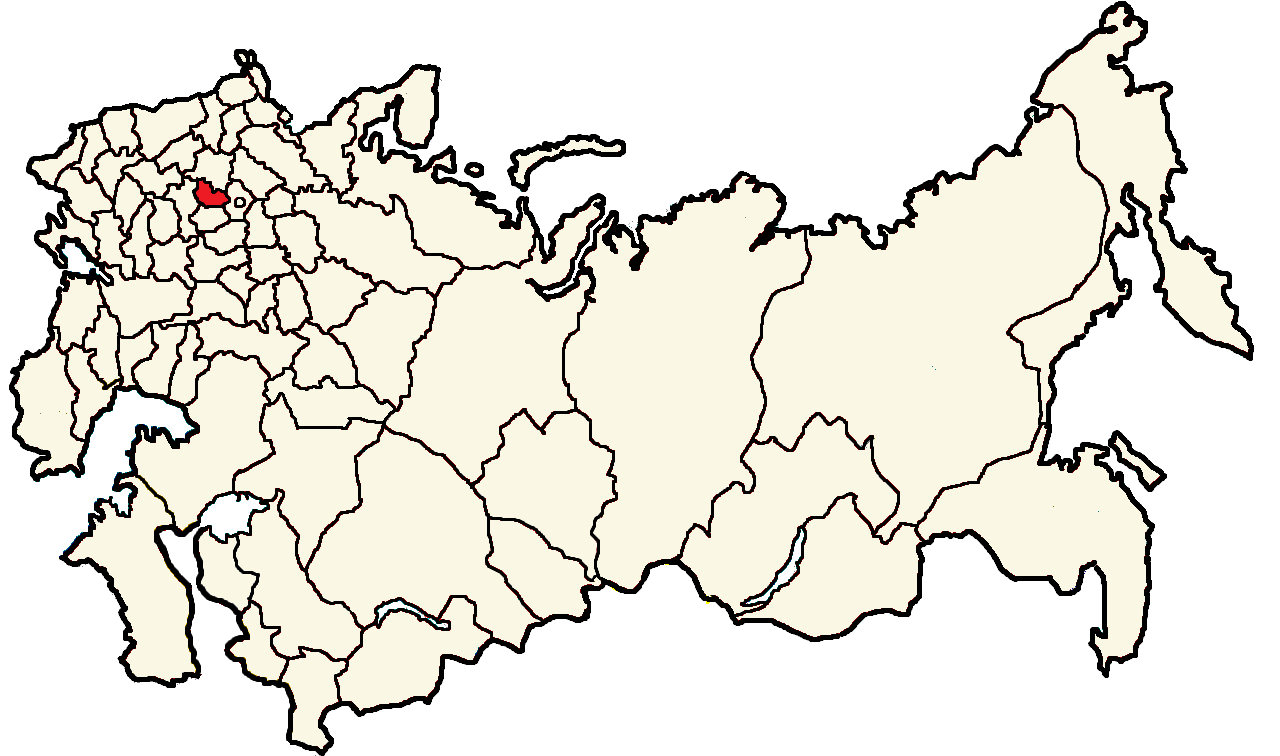
Kaluga electoral district

- Ivan Borodacheov (Socialist Revolutionary Party)/Council of peasant deputies
- Nikolai Glebov-Avilov (Bolsheviks)
- Boris Yeliseyev (Socialist Revolutionary Party)/Council of peasant deputies
- Peotr Zakharov (Bolsheviks)
- Pavel Logachev (Bolsheviks)
- Nikolai Parol (Socialist Revolutionary Party)/Council of peasant deputies
- Innokentiy Stukov (Bolsheviks)
- Vladimir Turov (Bolsheviks)

== Kamchatka ==
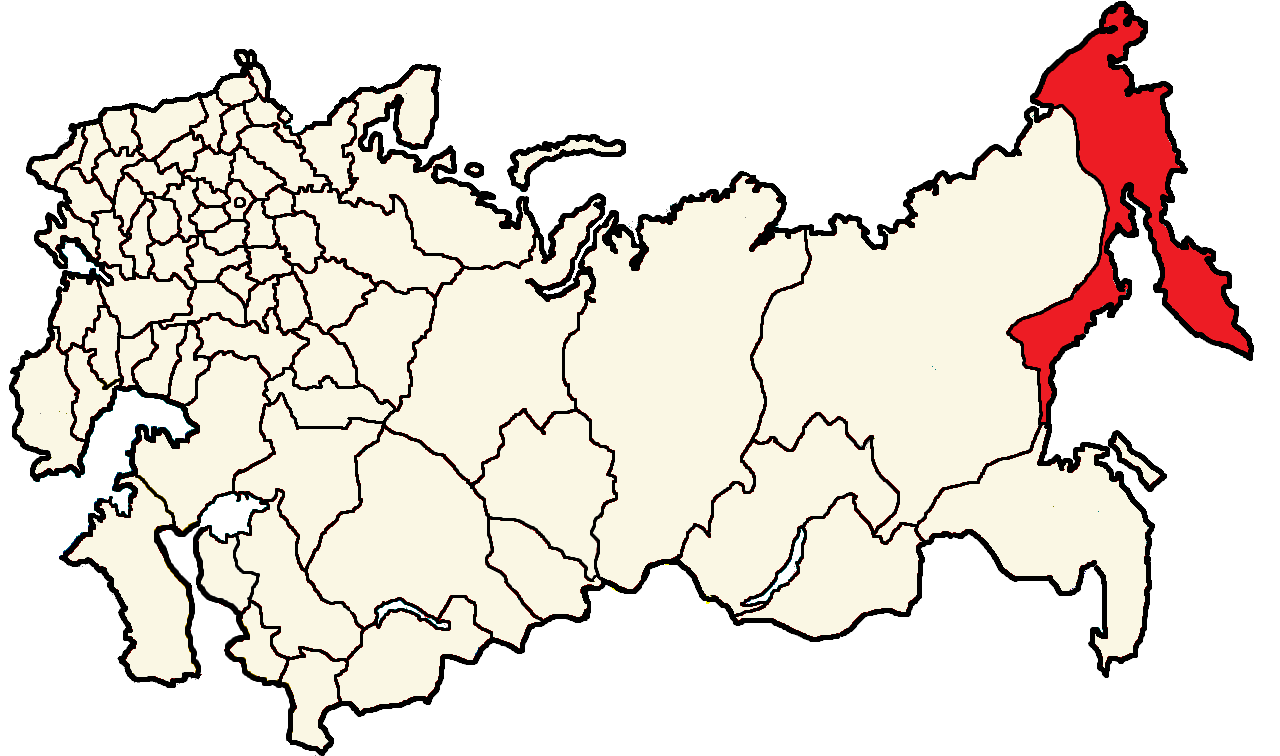
Kamchatka electoral district

- Konstantin Lavrov (Socialist Revolutionary Party)

== Kazan ==
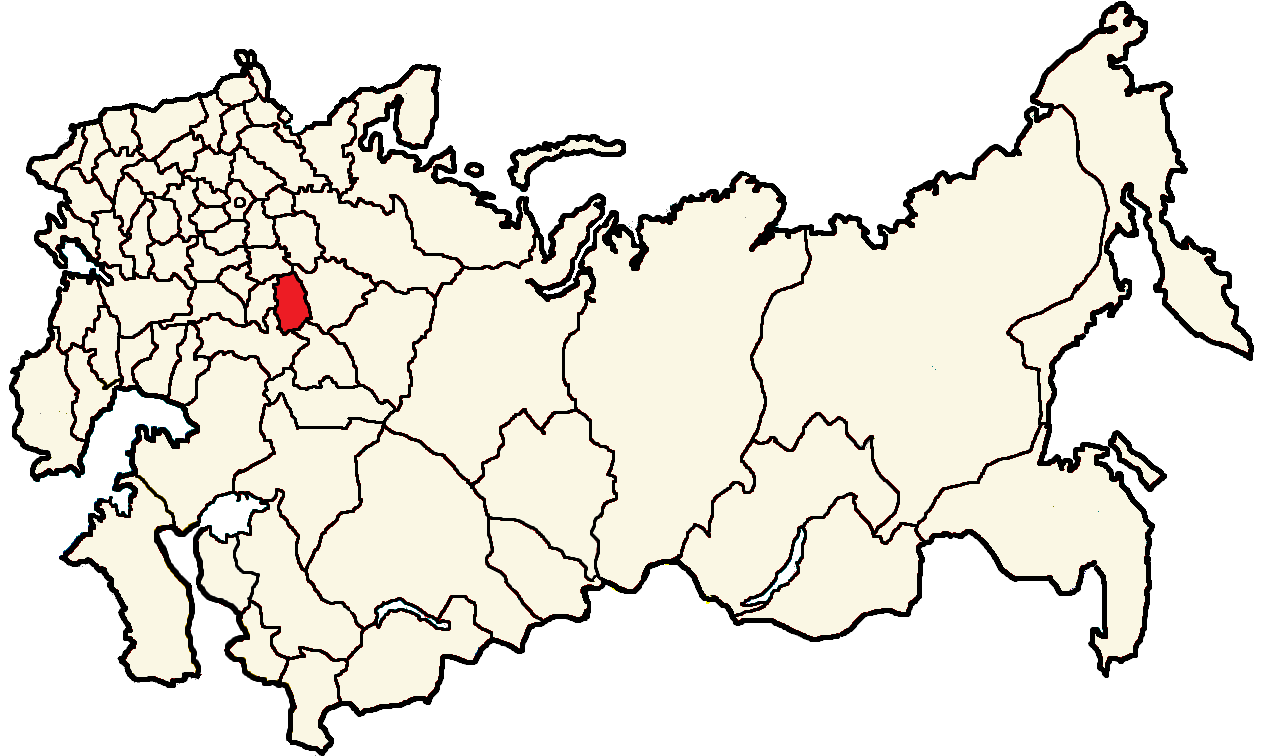
Kazan electoral district

- Ilyas Alkin (Muslim Socialist list)
- Gavriil Alyunov (All-Chuvash National Congress)
- Ivan Vasilyev (All-Chuvash National Congress, Chuvash Military Committee, Chuvash SR Party)
- Mullanur Waxitov (Muslim Socialist list)
- Andrei Kolegayev (Socialist Revolutionary Party)/Council of peasant deputies
- Ilya Mayorov (Socialist Revolutionary Party)/Council of peasant deputies
- Grigoriy Martiushin (Socialist Revolutionary Party)/Council of peasant deputies
- Vasiliy Mokhov (Socialist Revolutionary Party)/Council of peasant deputies
- Semeon Nikolayev (All-Chuvash National Congress)
- Samigulla Salekhov (Muslim Assembly)
- Nikolai Sukhanov (Socialist Revolutionary Party)/Council of peasant deputies
- Nazip Khalfin (Muslim Assembly)

== Kharkov ==
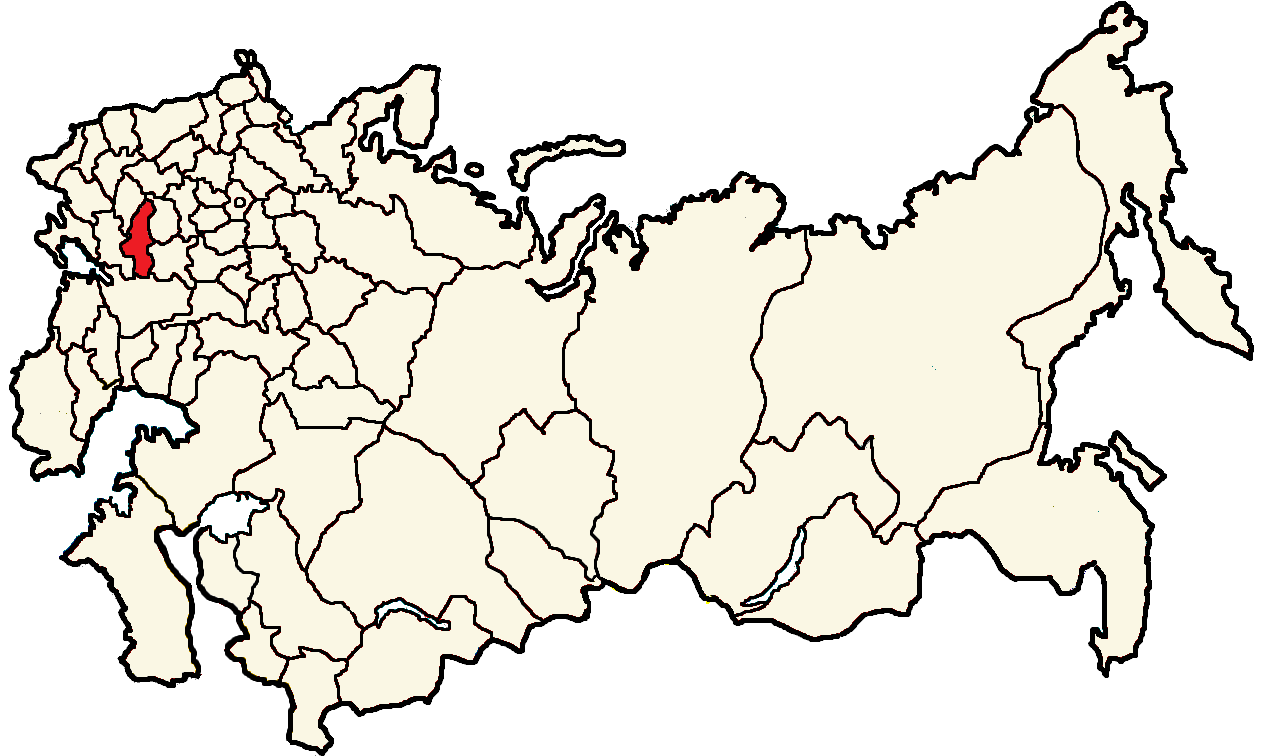
Kharkov electoral district

- Nikolay Alekseyev (Zemlia i Volia)
- Vasiliy Diakonov (Zemlia i Volia)
- Vladimir Karelin (Zemlia i Volia)
- Vladimir Kachinskiy (Zemlia i Volia)
- Ivan Kravchenko (Zemlia i Volia)
- Ignat Mikhailichenko (Zemlia i Volia)
- Matvei Muranov (Bolsheviks)
- Andrei Ovcharenko (Zemlia i Volia)
- Nikolai Popov (Zemlia i Volia)
- Nikolai Sviatitskiy (Zemlia i Volia)
- Afanasiy Severov-Odoyevskiy (Zemlia i Volia)
- Fyodor Sergeyev (Bolsheviks)
- Aleksandr Streltsov (Socialist Revolutionary Party)
- Nikolai Shkorbatov (Zemlia i Volia)

== Kherson ==
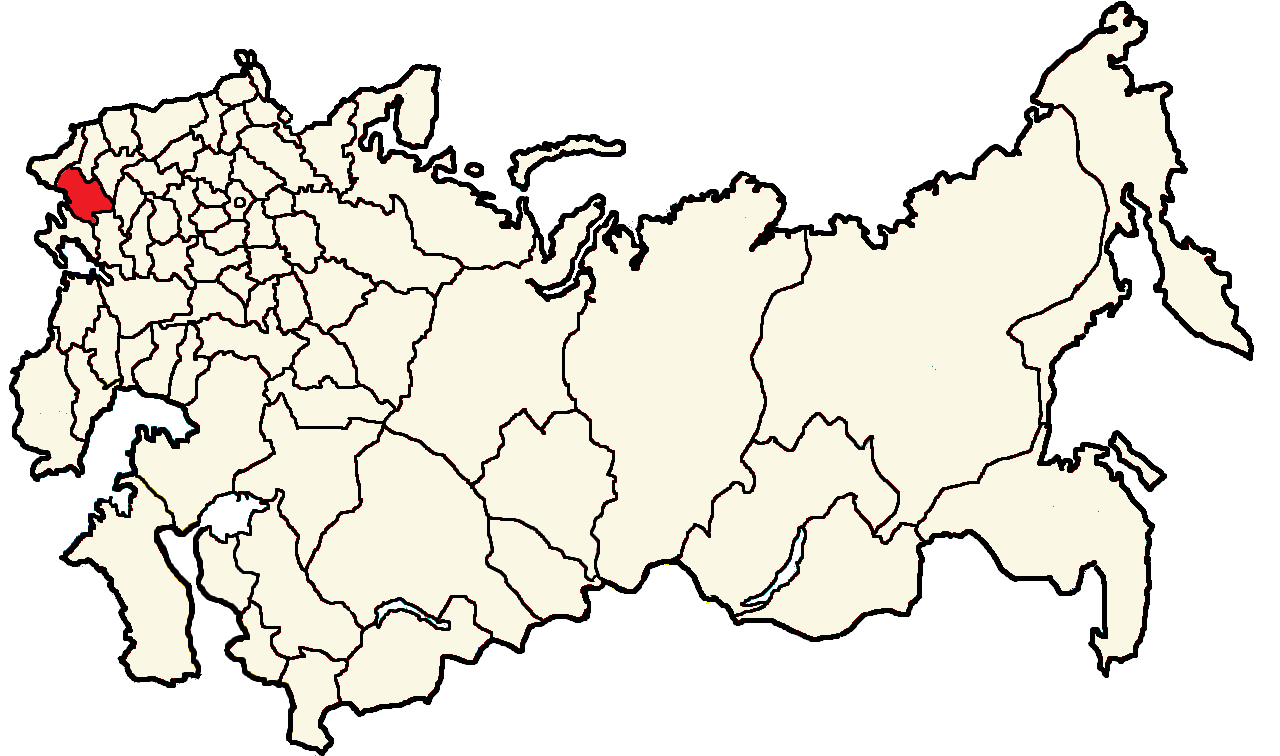
Kherson electoral district

- Anton Bontsarevych Council of peasant deputies
- Danylo Vekhtev Council of peasant deputies
- Illia Havrylyuk Council of peasant deputies
- Kindrat Hlevenko Council of peasant deputies
- Vsevolod Holubovych Council of peasant deputies
- Mykhailo Hordiyevskyi Council of peasant deputies
- Oscar Gruzenberg (Jewish National Bloc)
- Davyd Lvovych Council of peasant deputies
- Volodymyr Rikhter Council of peasant deputies
- Iosif Skliar (Bolsheviks)
- Petro Tryshevskyi Council of peasant deputies
- Yakiv Troichuk Council of peasant deputies
- Oleksiy Feofilaktov Council of peasant deputies
- Volodymyr Chekhivsky (Ukrainian Social Democratic Labour Party)
- Serhiy Yurytsyn Council of peasant deputies
- (Volodymyr Asmolov Council of peasant deputies)?
- Lev Velikhov (Constitutional Democratic Party)
- (Hryhoriy Yeremnchuk Council of peasant deputies)?
- (Alexander Freiherr von Meyendorff (Russian Germans))?
- Vladimir Teomkin (Jewish National Electoral Committee)

== Kiev ==
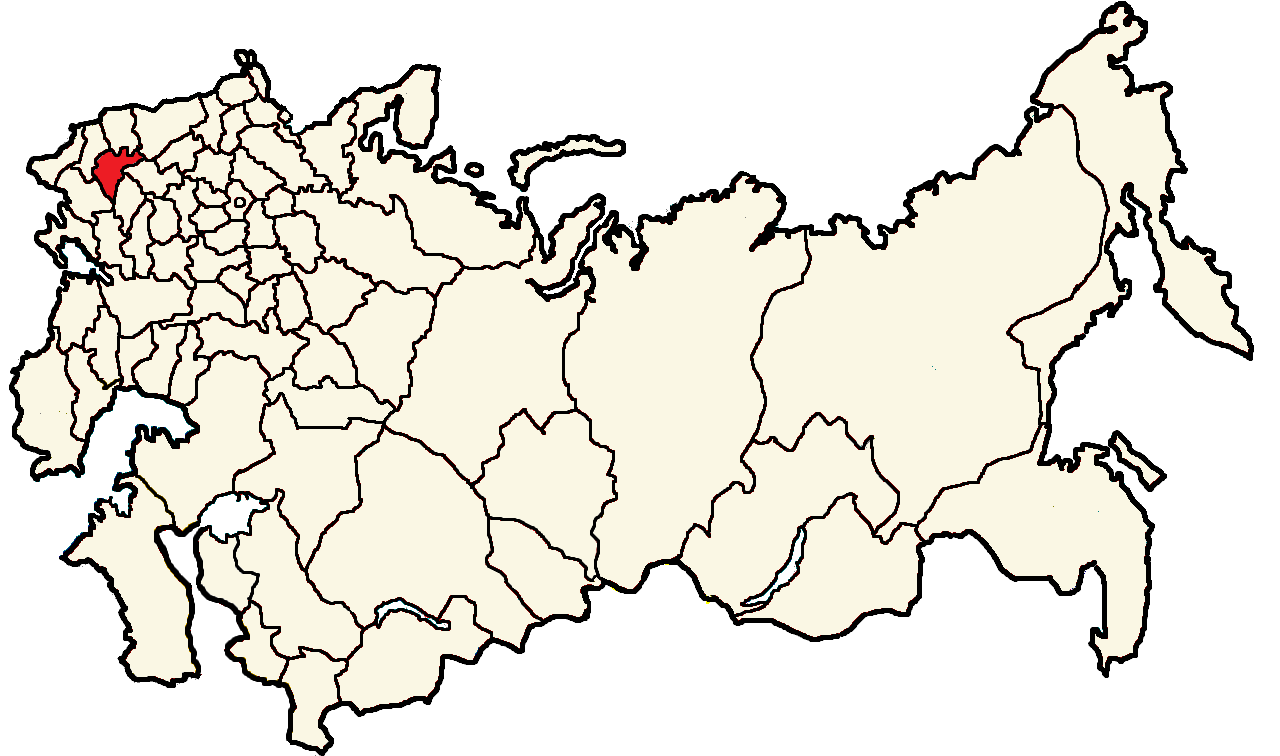
Kiev electoral district

- Volodymyr Vynnychenko (Ukrainian Social Revolutionary)
- Mykhailo Hrushevsky (Ukrainian Social Revolutionary)
- Serhiy Donchenko (Ukrainian Social Revolutionary)
- Oleksandr Ilchenko (Ukrainian Social Revolutionary)
- Yevhen Kotyk (Ukrainian Socialist Revolutionary Party, Ukrainian Peasant Union)
- Mykyta Mandryka (Ukrainian Social Revolutionary)
- Mykola Porsh (Ukrainian Social Revolutionary)
- Vasyl Prysiazhniuk (Ukrainian Social Revolutionary)
- Hryhoriy Pyrkovka (Ukrainian Social Revolutionary)
- Vasyl Rokhmaniuk (Ukrainian Social Revolutionary)
- Oleksandr Sevriuk (Ukrainian Social Revolutionary)
- Mykola Stasyuk (Ukrainian Social Revolutionary)
- Naum Syrkin (Jewish National Committee)
- Mykhailo Tkachenko (Ukrainian Social Revolutionary)
- Andriy Khomutovskyi (Ukrainian Social Revolutionary)
- Vasyl Khymeryk (Ukrainian Social Revolutionary)
- Mykola Chechel (Ukrainian Social Revolutionary)
- Fedir Shvets (Ukrainian Social Revolutionary)
- Mykhailo Darchuk (Ukrainian Socialist Revolutionary Party, Social-Democrats, Ukrainian Peasant Union)
- Antin Drahomyretskyi (Ukrainian Socialist Revolutionary Party, Social-Democrats, Ukrainian Peasant Union)
- Ippolit Fialek (Bolsheviks)

== Kostroma ==
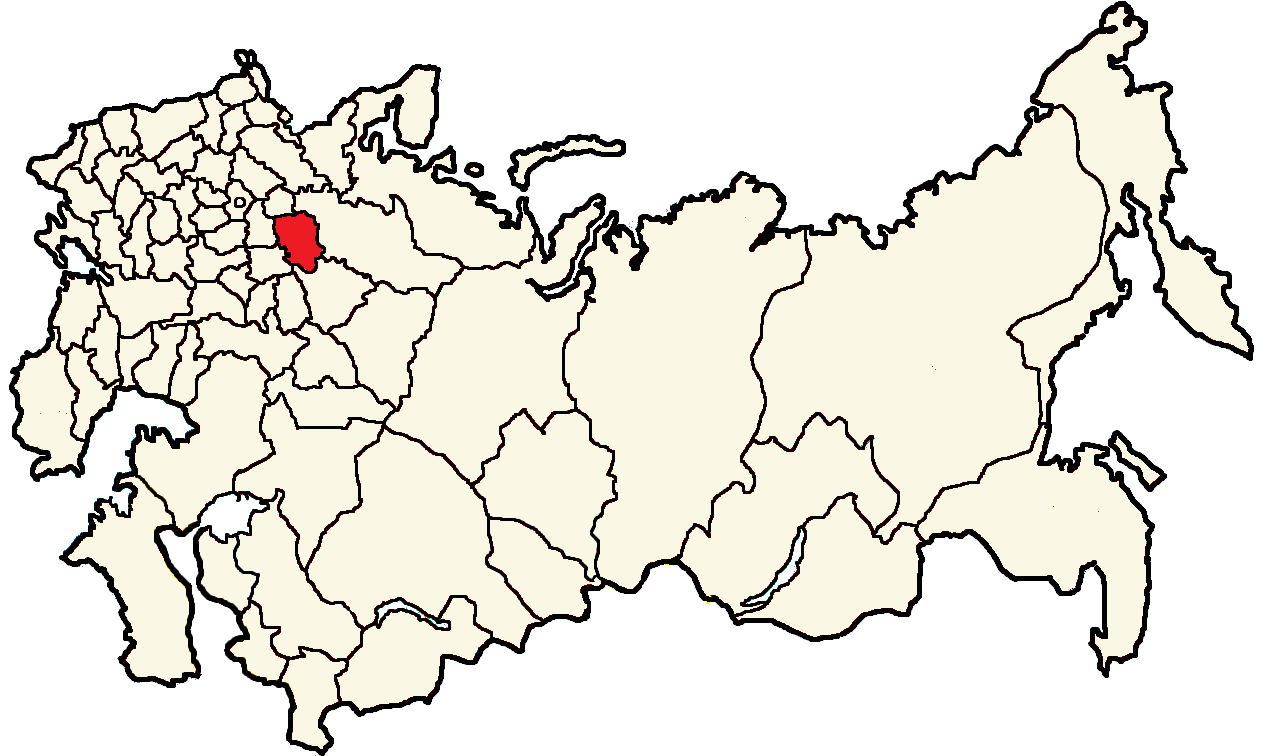
Kostroma electoral district

- Stepan Danilov (Bolsheviks)
- Nikolai Kozlov (Zemlia i Volia)
- Nikolai Kondratiev (Zemlia i Volia)
- Yuri Larin (Bolsheviks)
- Sergei Lotoshnikov (Zemlia i Volia)
- Ivan Maltsev (Zemlia i Volia)
- Dmitriy Malyutin (Bolsheviks)
- Nikolai Rastopchin (Bolsheviks)

== Kursk ==
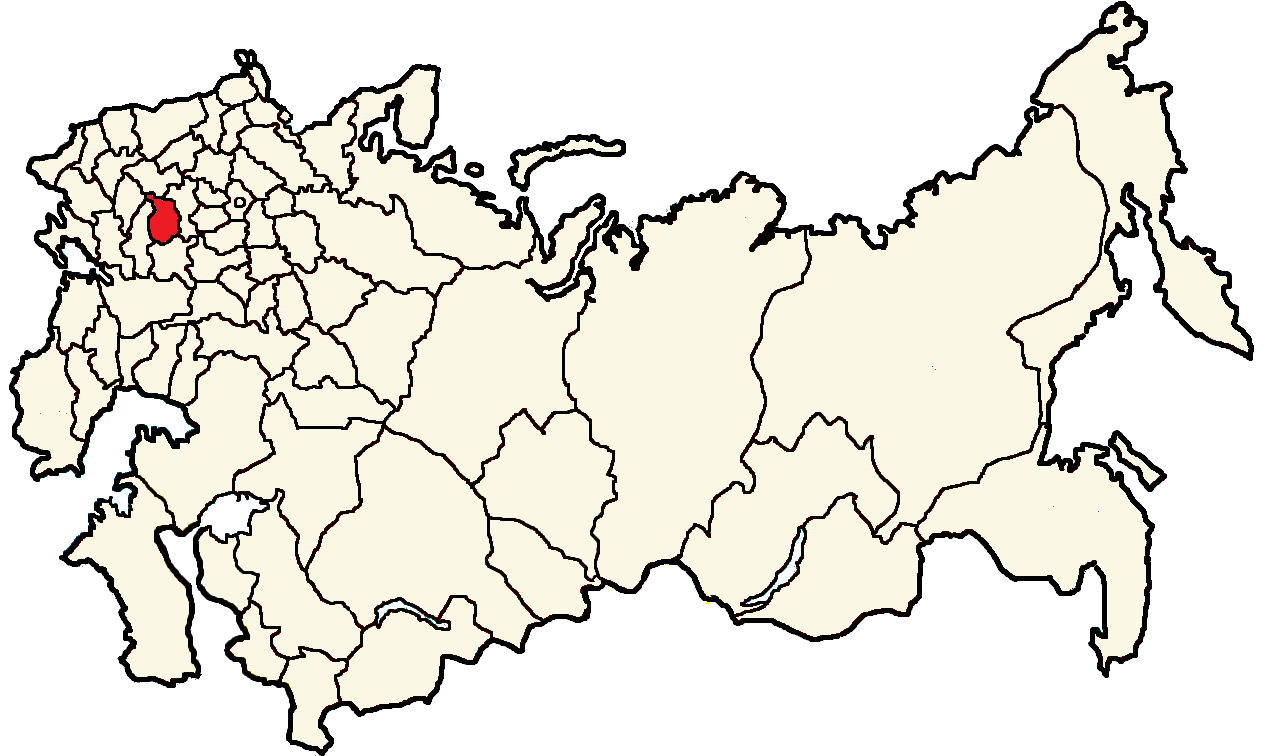
Kursk electoral district

- Aleksandr Baryshnikov (Socialist Revolutionary Party)
- Konstantin Belorussov (Socialist Revolutionary Party)
- Aleksandr Vlasov (Socialist Revolutionary Party)
- Nikita Doroshev (Socialist Revolutionary Party)
- Feodor Kutepov (Socialist Revolutionary Party)
- Mikhail Merkulov (Socialist Revolutionary Party)
- Anatoliy Neruchev (Socialist Revolutionary Party)
- Ivan Ozemblovskiy (Bolsheviks)
- Vasiliy Pakhomov (Socialist Revolutionary Party)
- Ivan Pyanykh (Socialist Revolutionary Party)
- Pavel Romanenko (Socialist Revolutionary Party)
- Andrian Rusanov (Socialist Revolutionary Party)
- Boris Kholodov (Socialist Revolutionary Party)

== Livonia ==
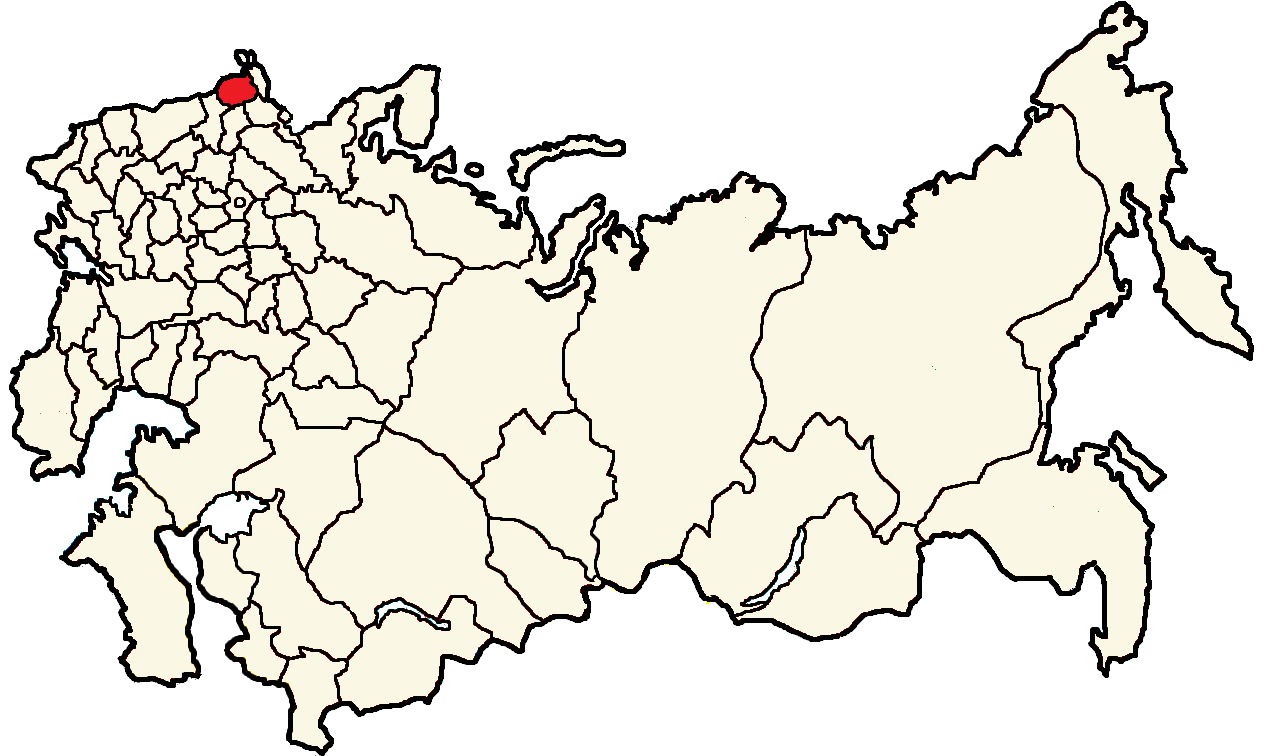
Livonia electoral district

- Jan Berzin (Latvian Social Democratic Workers' Party)
- Jānis Goldmanis (All-Russian Peasant Union)
- Karl Peterson (Latvian Social Democratic Workers' Party)
- Fricis Roziņš (Latvian Social Democratic Workers' Party)

== Minsk ==
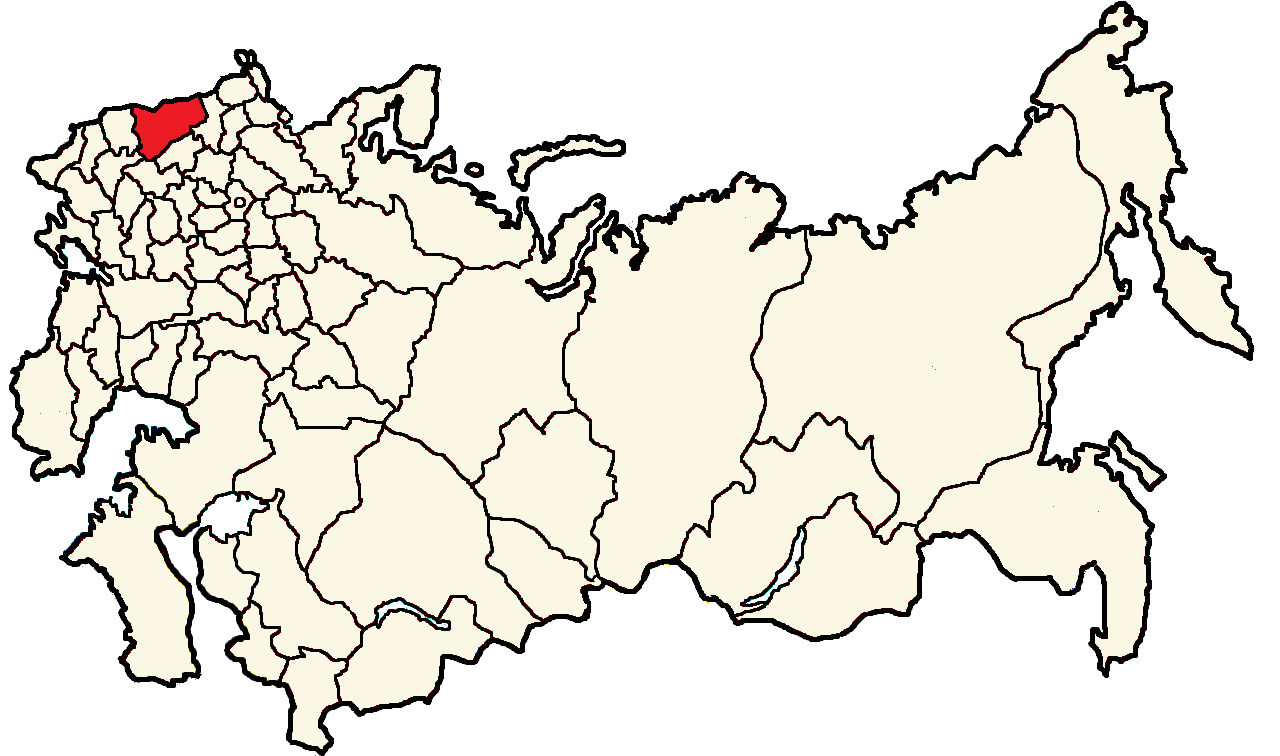
Minsk electoral district

- Ivan Alibegov (Bolsheviks)
- Julius Brutzkus (Jewish National Electoral Committee)
- Peotr Gamzagurdi (Socialist Revolutionary Party)/Council of peasant deputies
- Lev Gromashevskiy (Bolsheviks)
- Vladimir Drizo (Socialist Revolutionary Party)/Council of peasant deputies
- Vladimir Kozhuro (Bolsheviks)
- Nikolai Krivoshein (Bolsheviks)
- Kārlis Landers (Bolsheviks)
- Ivan Nesterov (Socialist Revolutionary Party)/Council of peasant deputies
- Vladimir Selezneov (Bolsheviks)
- Andrei Taganov (Bolsheviks)
- Vasiliy Freiman (Bolsheviks)
- Nikodim Schlegel (Bolsheviks)
- Osip Balai (Socialist Revolutionary Party)/Council of peasant deputies

== Mogilev ==
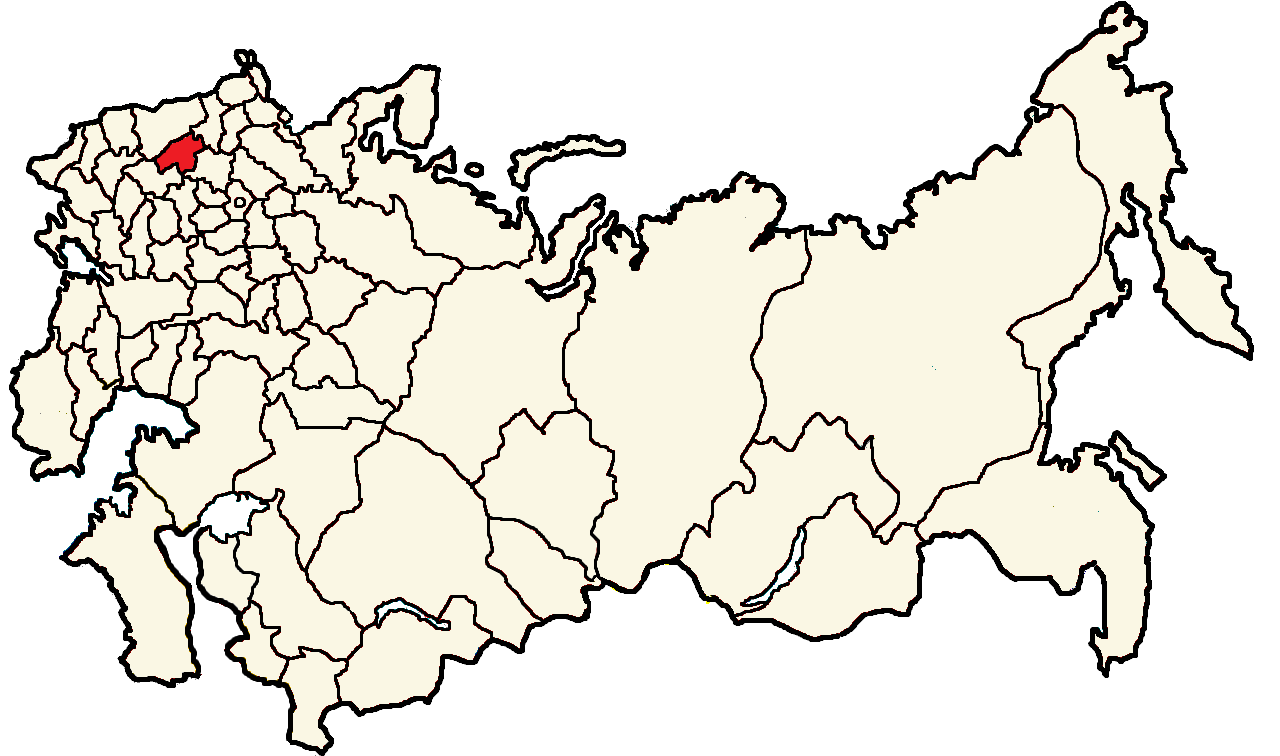
Mogilev electoral district

- Anatoliy Buslov (Socialist Revolutionary Party)/Council of peasant deputies
- Paramon Voronov (Socialist Revolutionary Party)/Council of peasant deputies
- Yegor Zakrevskiy (Socialist Revolutionary Party)/Council of peasant deputies
- Mikhail Zasorin (Socialist Revolutionary Party)/Council of peasant deputies
- Ilya Kovarskiy (Socialist Revolutionary Party)/Council of peasant deputies
- Yaakov Mazeh (Jewish National Committee)
- Ivan Maleyev (Socialist Revolutionary Party)/Council of peasant deputies
- Stepan Malyshitskiy (Socialist Revolutionary Party)/Council of peasant deputies
- S. Ansky (Socialist Revolutionary Party)/Council of peasant deputies
- Lukian Khrisanenkov (Socialist Revolutionary Party)/Council of peasant deputies
- Aleksandr Tsvetayev (Socialist Revolutionary Party)/Council of peasant deputies
- Roman Shishayev (Socialist Revolutionary Party)/Council of peasant deputies
- Terentiy Vasilevskiy (Socialist Revolutionary Party)/Council of peasant deputies
- Grigoriy Leplevskiy (Bolsheviks)
- Naphtali Friedman (Jewish National Committee)
- Lazar Kaganovich (Bolsheviks)

== Moscow ==
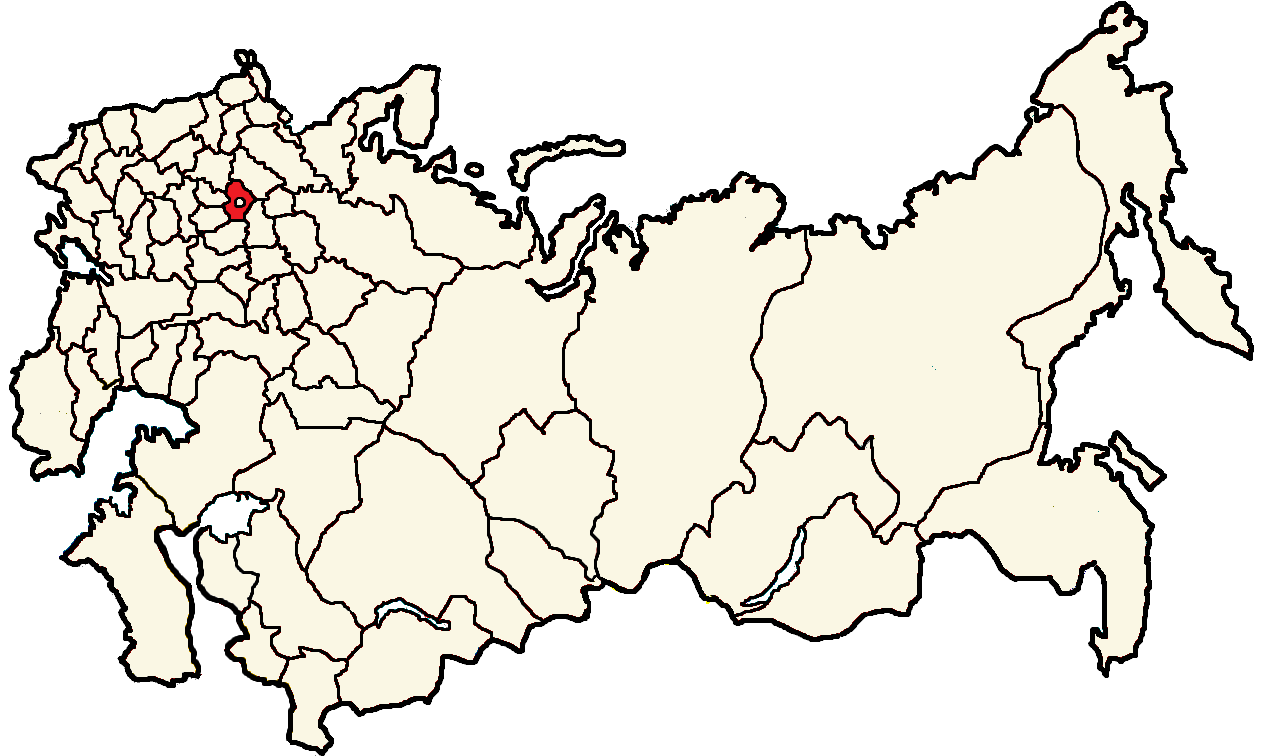
Moscow electoral district

- Vladimir Baryshnikov (Bolsheviks)
- Vasiliy Bykov (Socialist Revolutionary Party)
- Pavel Dolgorukov (National Freedom)
- Nikolai Meshcheryakov (Bolsheviks-Internationalists)
- Osip Minor (Socialist Revolutionary Party)
- Viktor Nogin (Bolsheviks)
- Vladimir Pavlov (Socialist Revolutionary Party)
- Timofei Sapronov (Bolsheviks-Internationalists)
- Aleksandr Smirnov (Bolsheviks-Internationalists)
- Ivan Kokushkin (Bolsheviks)

== Moscow–Capital ==
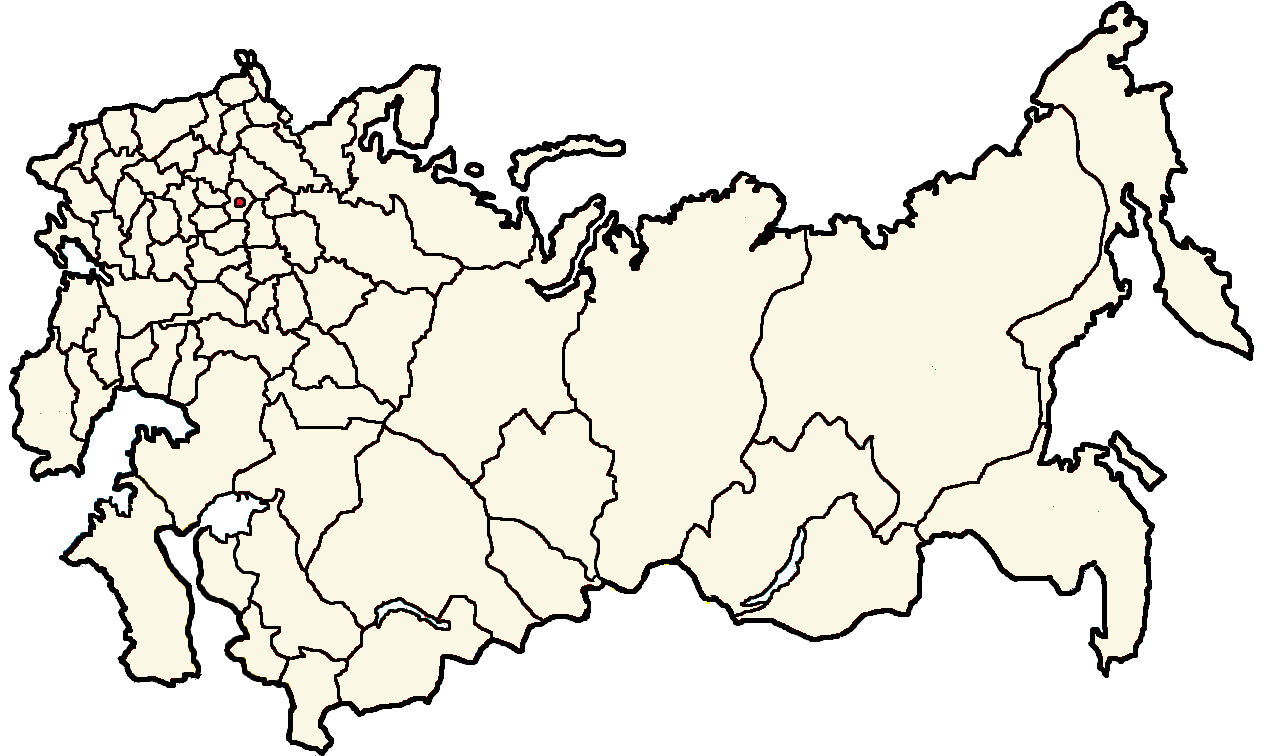
Moscow-Capital electoral district

- Nikolay Astrov (National Freedom)
- Nikolai Bukharin (Bolsheviks-Internationalists)
- Yefim Ignatov (Bolsheviks-Internationalists)
- Fyodor Kokoshkin (National Freedom)
- Vasily Maklakov (National Freedom)
- Pavel Novgorodtsev (National Freedom)
- Pyotr Smidovich (Bolsheviks-Internationalists)
- Ivan Skvortsov-Stepanov (Bolsheviks-Internationalists)
- Yemelyan Yaroslavsky (Bolsheviks-Internationalists)

== Nizhniy Novgorod ==
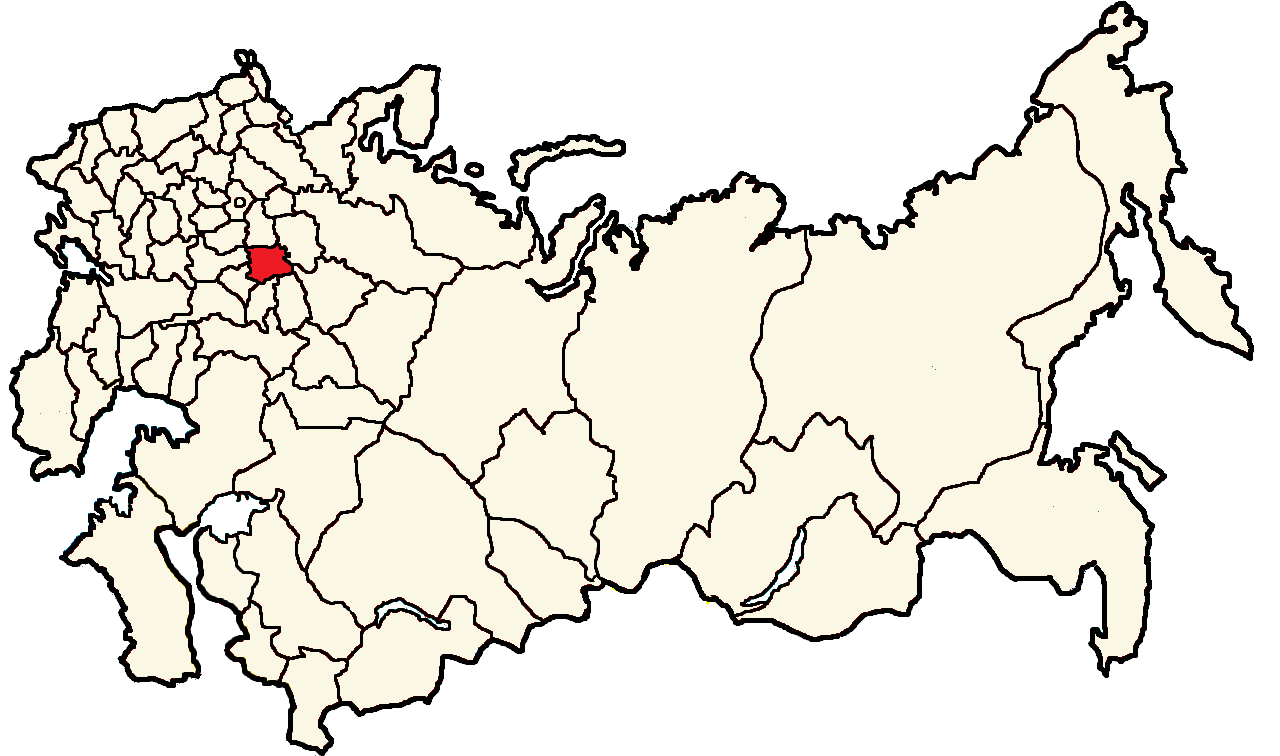
Nizhniy Novgorod electoral district

- Dmitriy Danilov (Bolsheviks)
- Mikhail Kutuzov (Socialist Revolutionary Party)/Council of peasant deputies
- Andrei Lukyanov (Socialist Revolutionary Party)/Council of peasant deputies
- Dmitriy Rakov (Socialist Revolutionary Party)/Council of peasant deputies
- Ivan Romanov (Bolsheviks)
- Mikhail Sumgin (Socialist Revolutionary Party)/Council of peasant deputies
- Dmitriy Tiurikov (Socialist Revolutionary Party)/Council of peasant deputies
- Mikhail Fokeyev (Socialist Revolutionary Party)/Council of peasant deputies
- Archepiscope Sergius (Group of Christian Unity)

== Novgorod ==
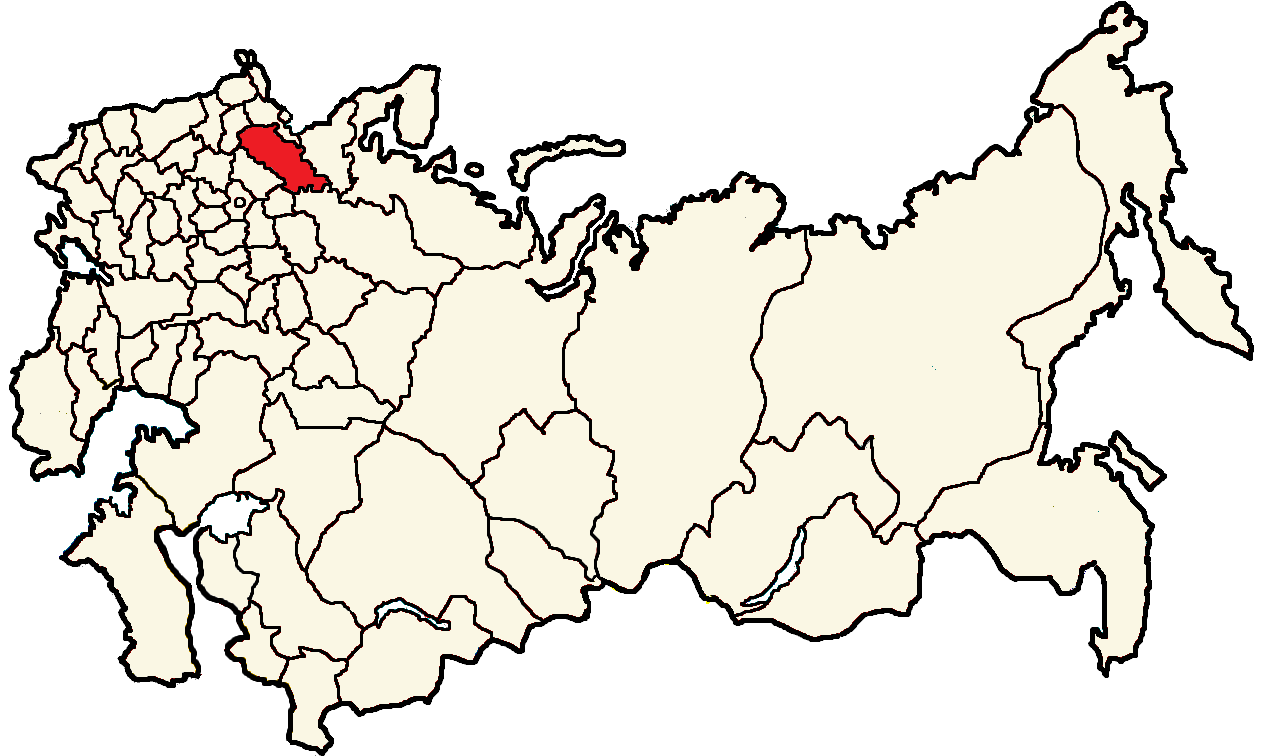
Novgorod electoral district

- Grigoriy Valentinov (Bolsheviks)
- Aleksandr Glukovskiy (Socialist Revolutionary Party)
- Dmitriy Yermakov (Bolsheviks)
- Pavel Kobiakov (Socialist Revolutionary Party)
- Vasiliy Leontyev (Socialist Revolutionary Party)
- Ilya Pashin (Bolsheviks)
- Nikolai Sokolov (Socialist Revolutionary Party)
- Leon Trotsky (Bolsheviks)
- Moisei Uritsky (Bolsheviks)

== Priamur ==
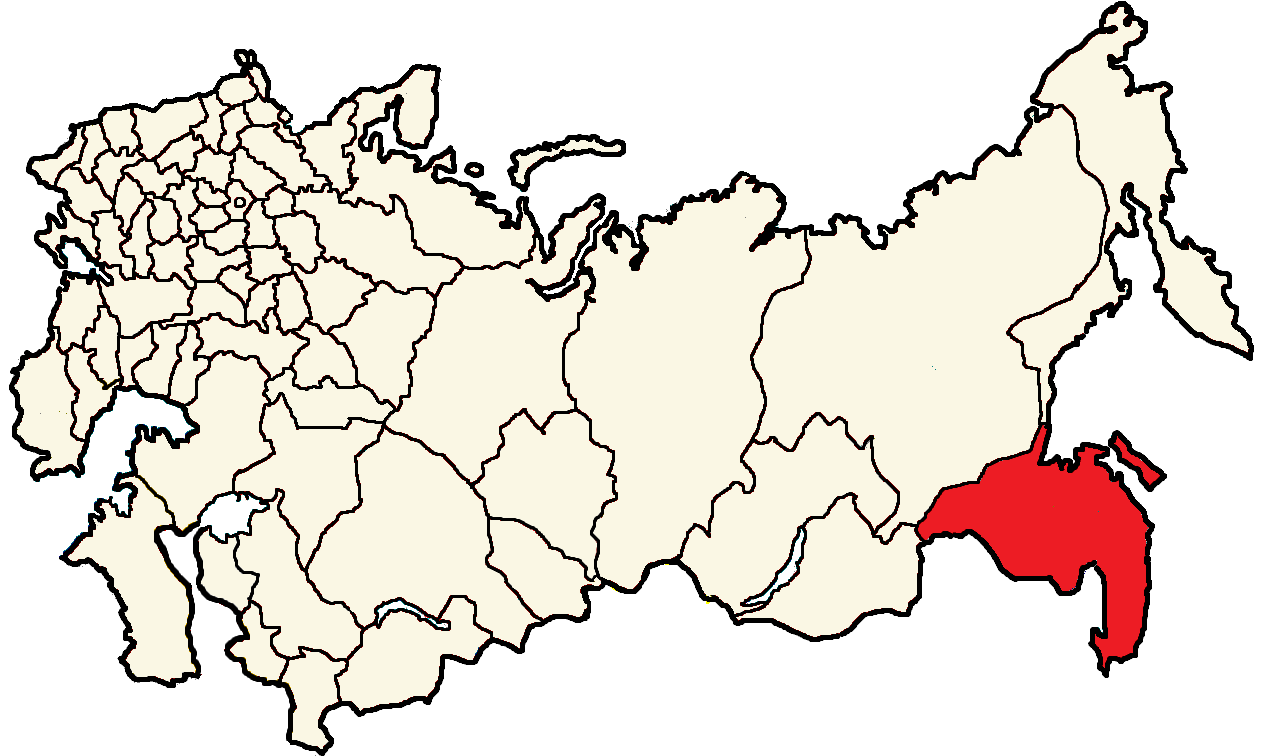
Priamur electoral district

- Aleksandr Alekseyevskiy (Socialist Revolutionary Party)
- Vladimir Vykhristov Council of peasant deputies
- Nikolai Kozhevnikov (Amur and Ussuriisk Cossacks)
- Mikhail Mandrikov Council of peasant deputies
- Arnolds Neibuts (Bolsheviks)
- Valerian Petrov Council of peasant deputies
- Feodor Sorokin Council of peasant deputies

== Olonets ==
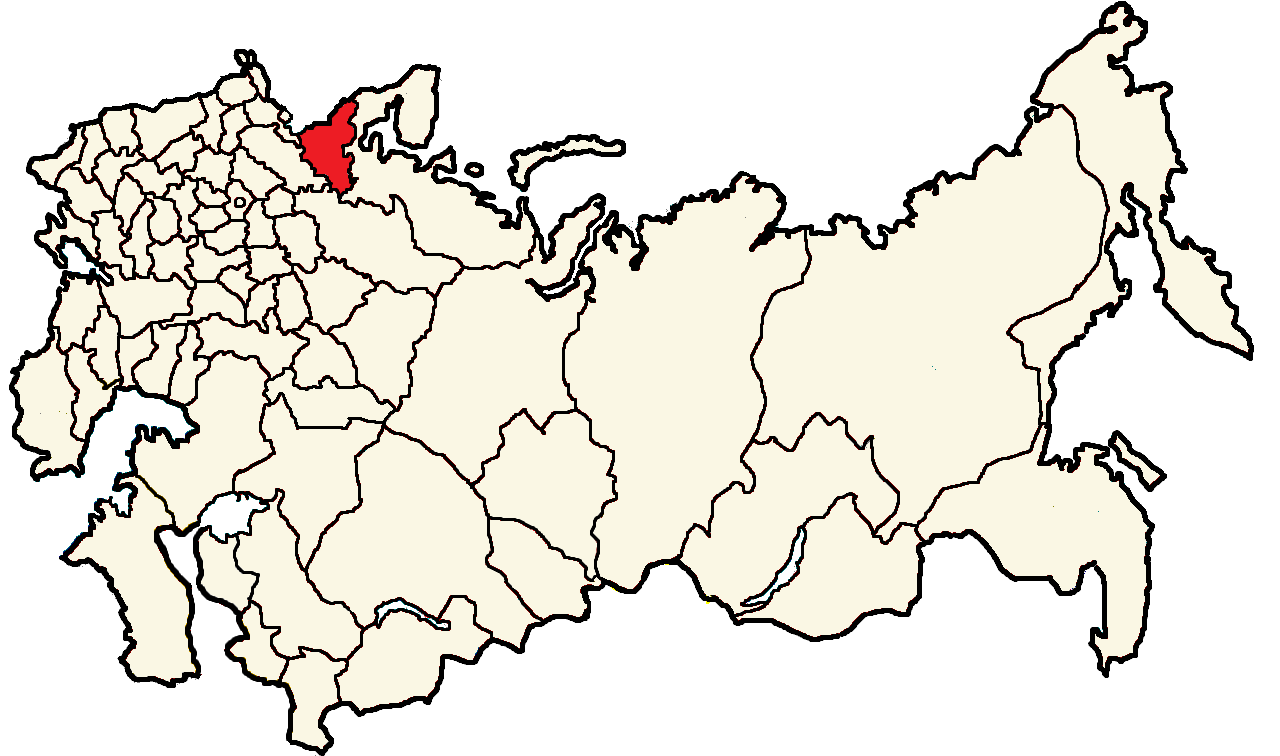
Olonets electoral district

- Andrei Matveyev Congress of peasant deputies
- Matvei Shishkin Congress of peasant deputies

== Orenburg ==
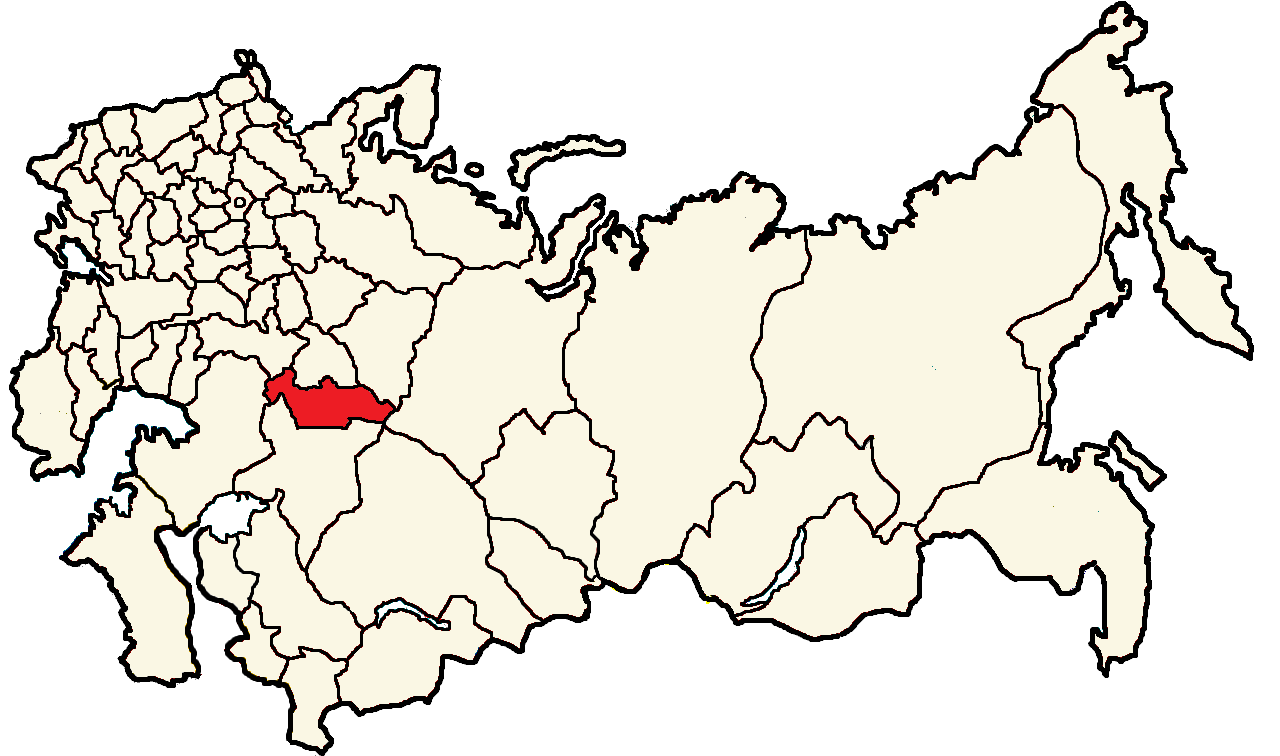
Orenburg electoral district

- Gabdrauf Bogdanov (Orenburg Cossacks)
- Alexander Dutov (Orenburg Cossacks)
- Aleksandr Korosteleov (Bolsheviks)
- Aleksandr Krivoscheokov (Orenburg Cossacks)
- Sharif Manatov (Bashkir Federation)
- Viacheslav Matushkin (Orenburg Cossacks)
- Mikhail Polyakov (Congress of Socialist Revolutionary Party and peasant deputies)
- Ivan Sorokin (Congress of Socialist Revolutionary Party and peasant deputies)
- Gabul-Akhad Fakhretdinov (Bashkir Federation)
- Samuil Zwilling (Bolsheviks)
- Sergei Chutskayev (Bolsheviks)
- Yunus Bikbov (Bashkir Federation)
- Aleksandr Miakutin (Orenburg Cossacks)

== Oryol ==
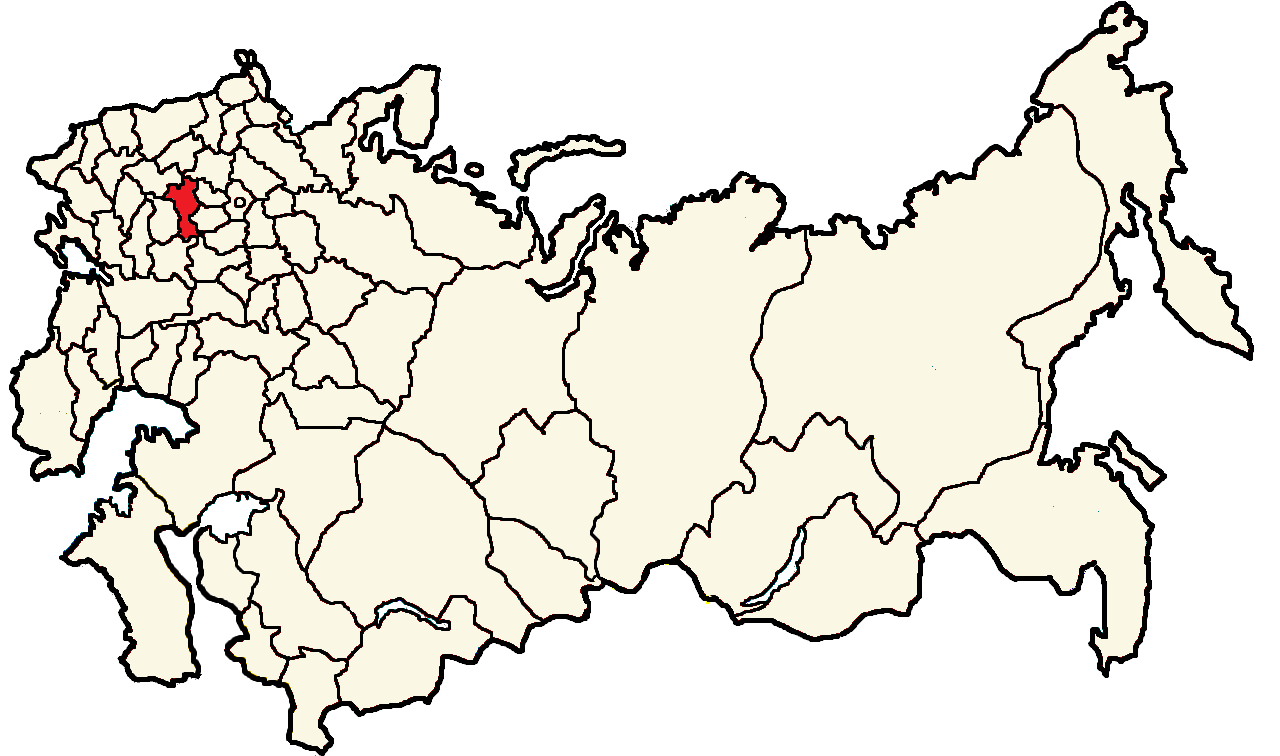
Oryol electoral district

- Nikifor Andreyev (Bolsheviks)
- Feofan Bukin (Socialist Revolutionary Party)/Council of peasant deputies
- Vladimir Vladykin (Socialist Revolutionary Party)/Council of peasant deputies
- Sergei Volodin (Socialist Revolutionary Party)/Council of peasant deputies
- Ivan Volnov (Socialist Revolutionary Party)/Council of peasant deputies
- Sergei Goncharov (Socialist Revolutionary Party)/Council of peasant deputies
- Mikhail Ivanov (Bolsheviks)
- Nikolai Kuznetsov (Bolsheviks)
- Semeon Maslov (Socialist Revolutionary Party)/Council of peasant deputies
- Olga Matveevskaya (Socialist Revolutionary Party)/Council of peasant deputies
- Ignatiy Fokin (Bolsheviks)
- Nikolai Khodotov (Socialist Revolutionary Party)/Council of peasant deputies

== Penza ==
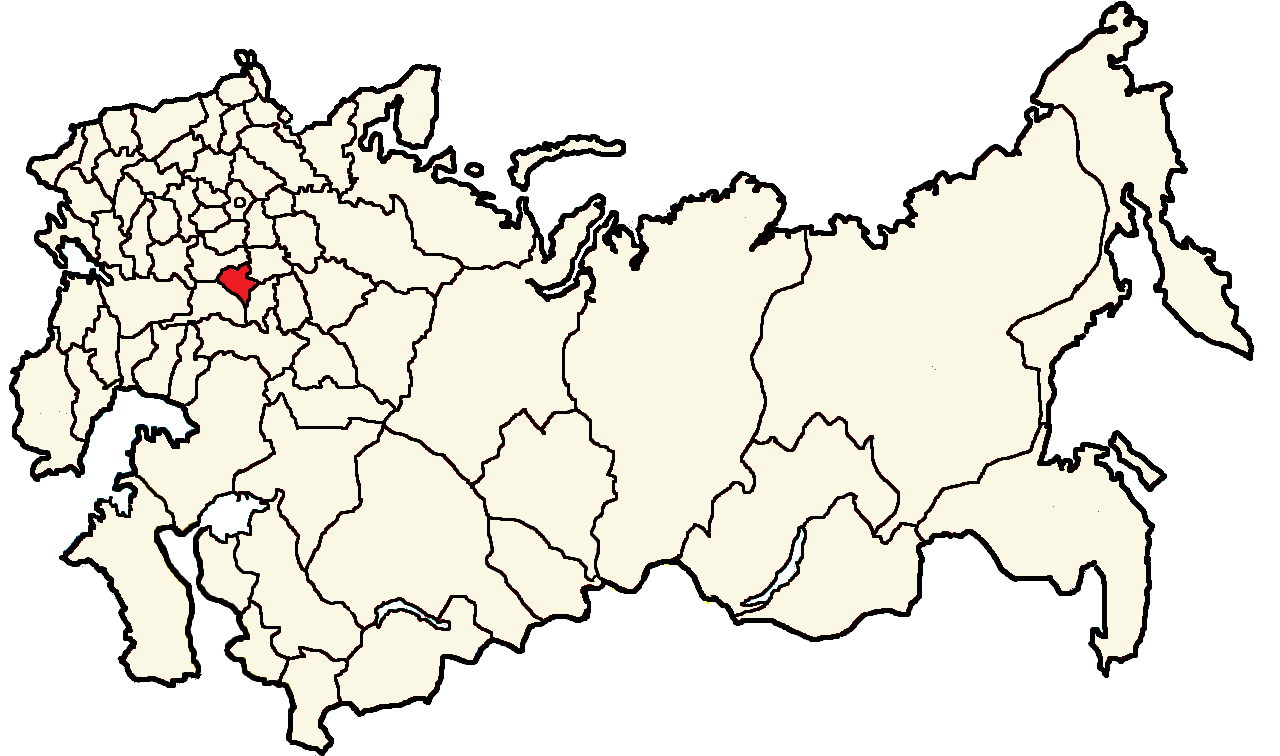
Penza electoral district

- Nikolai Avksentiev (Socialist Revolutionary Party)
- Mikhail Boldov (Socialist Revolutionary Party)
- Abram Gots (Socialist Revolutionary Party)
- Vasiliy Konogov (Socialist Revolutionary Party)
- Nikolai Kostin (Socialist Revolutionary Party)
- Aleksandr Levtonov (Socialist Revolutionary Party)
- Ivan Prokhorov (Socialist Revolutionary Party)
- Florian Fedorovich (Socialist Revolutionary Party)
- Iosif Tsyngovatov (Socialist Revolutionary Party)

== Perm ==
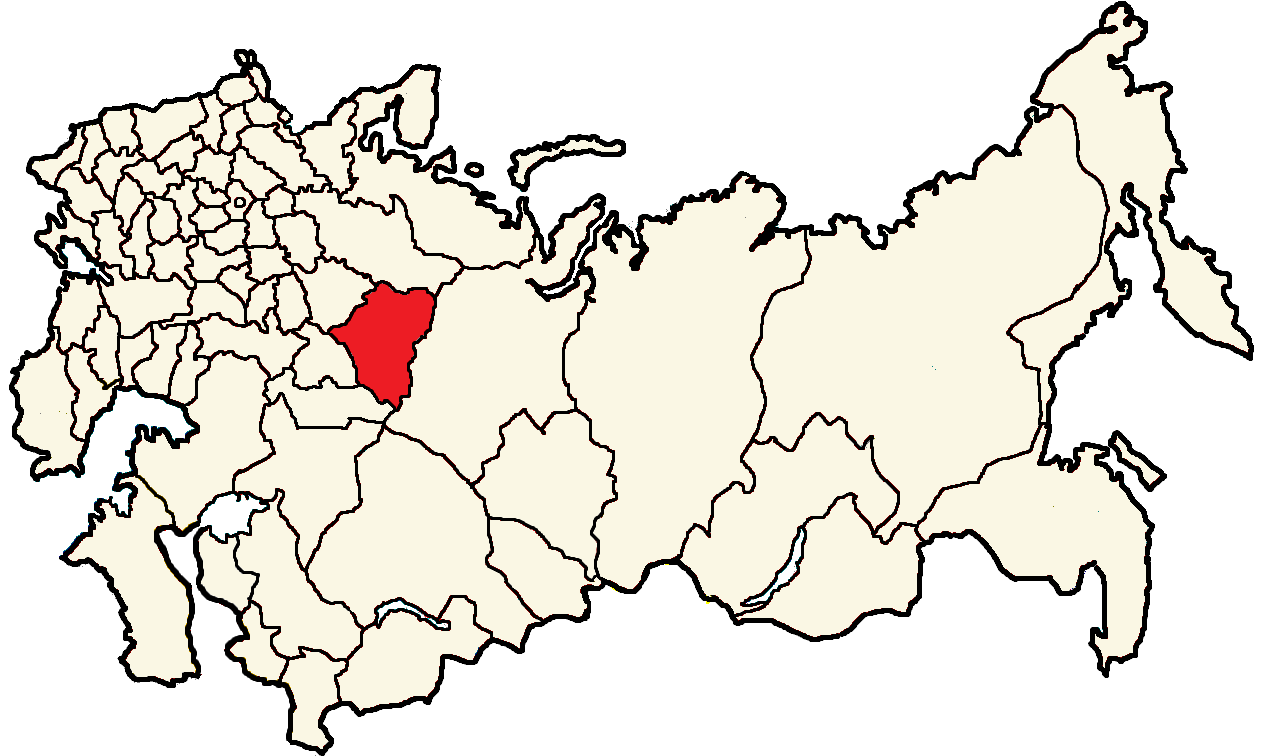
Perm electoral district

- Nikolay Alekseyev (Socialist Revolutionary Party)/Council of peasant deputies
- Alexander Beloborodov (Bolsheviks)
- Sergei Bondarev (Socialist Revolutionary Party)/Council of peasant deputies
- Aleksandr Varushkin (Socialist Revolutionary Party)/Council of peasant deputies
- Lev Gerstein (Socialist Revolutionary Party)/Council of peasant deputies
- Leonid Zateischikov (Socialist Revolutionary Party)/Council of peasant deputies
- Nikolai Zdobnov (Socialist Revolutionary Party)/Council of peasant deputies
- Aron Zisman (Socialist Revolutionary Party)/Council of peasant deputies
- Flegont Kabakov (Socialist Revolutionary Party)/Council of peasant deputies
- Nikolay Krestinsky (Bolsheviks)
- Lev Krol (National Freedom)
- Afanasiy Kuznetsov (Socialist Revolutionary Party)/Council of peasant deputies
- Mikhail Sigov (Socialist Revolutionary Party)/Council of peasant deputies
- Lev Sosnovsky (Bolsheviks)
- Stepan Tarabukin (Socialist Revolutionary Party)/Council of peasant deputies
- Fatikh Tukhvatullin (Bashkir-Tatar Group)
- Vladimir Andronnikov (Bolsheviks)
- Vladimir Sumarokov (National Freedom)

== Petrograd ==
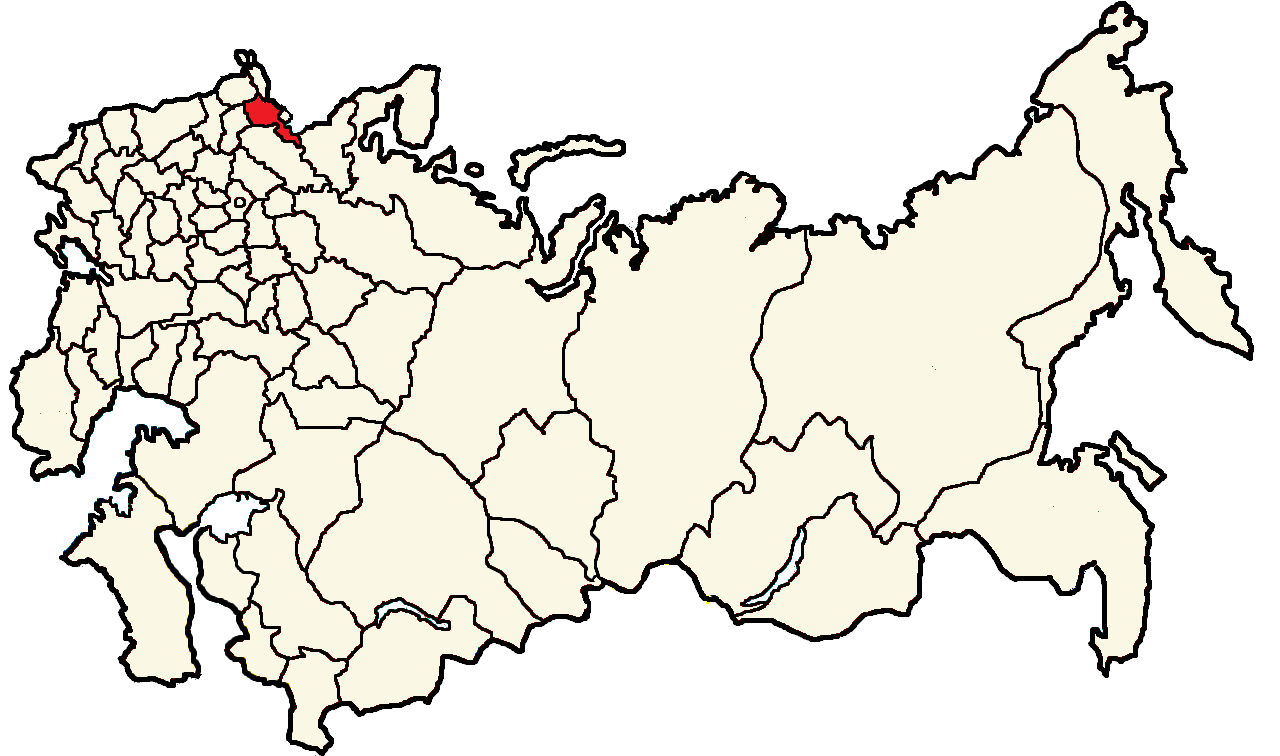
Petrograd electoral district

- Semeon Voskov (Bolsheviks)
- Aleksandr Vysotskiy (Socialist Revolutionary Party)/Council of peasant deputies
- Vladimir Zenzinov (Socialist Revolutionary Party)/Council of peasant deputies
- Vladimir Nabokov (National Freedom)
- Boris Nimvitskiy (Bolsheviks)
- Boris Pozern (Bolsheviks)
- Fyodor Raskolnikov (Bolsheviks)
- Alexander Shotman (Bolsheviks)
- Sergei Cherepanov Central Committee Military Organization

== Petrograd-Capital ==
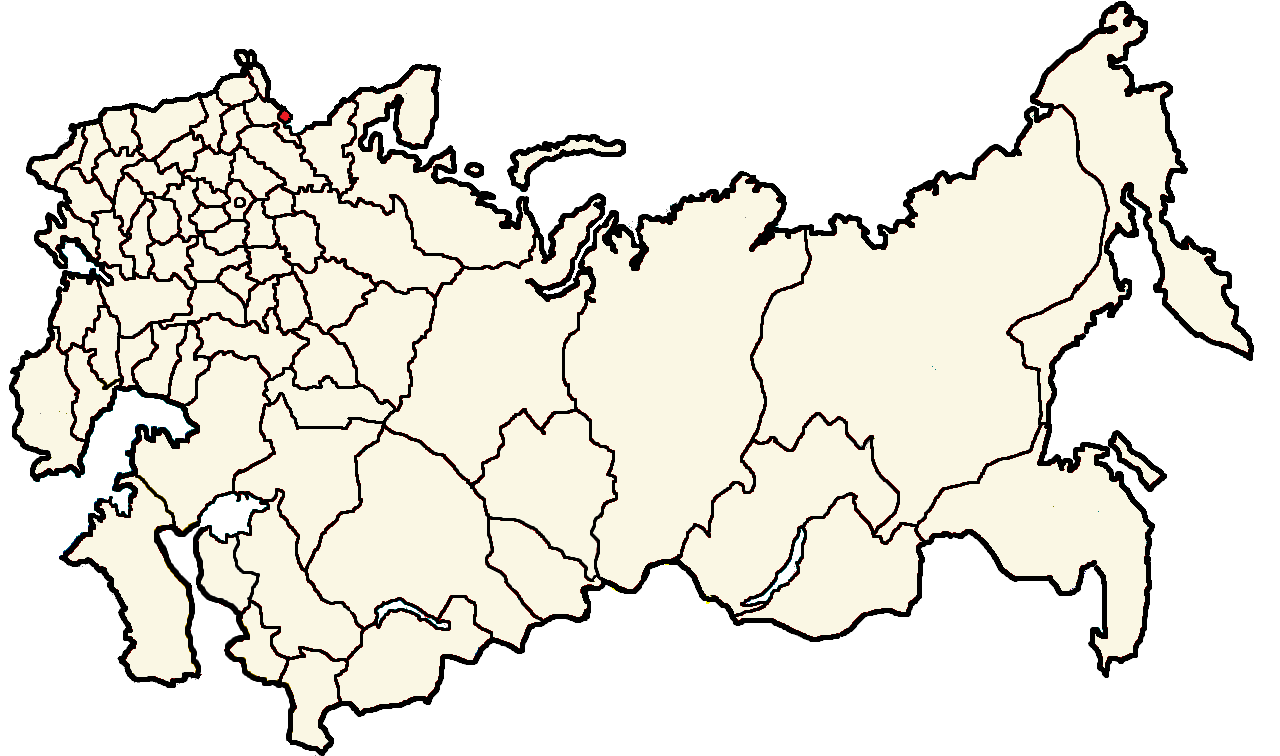
Petrograd-Capital electoral district

- Maxim Vinaver (National Freedom)
- Grigory Yevdokimov Central Committee
- Grigory Zinoviev Central Committee
- Mikhail Kalinin Central Committee
- Boris Kamkov (Socialist Revolutionary Party)
- Nikolai Kutler (National Freedom)
- Pavel Milyukov (National Freedom)
- Feodor Rodichev (National Freedom)
- Joseph Stalin Central Committee
- Józef Unszlicht Central Committee
- Grigoriy Schreider (Socialist Revolutionary Party)

== Podolia ==
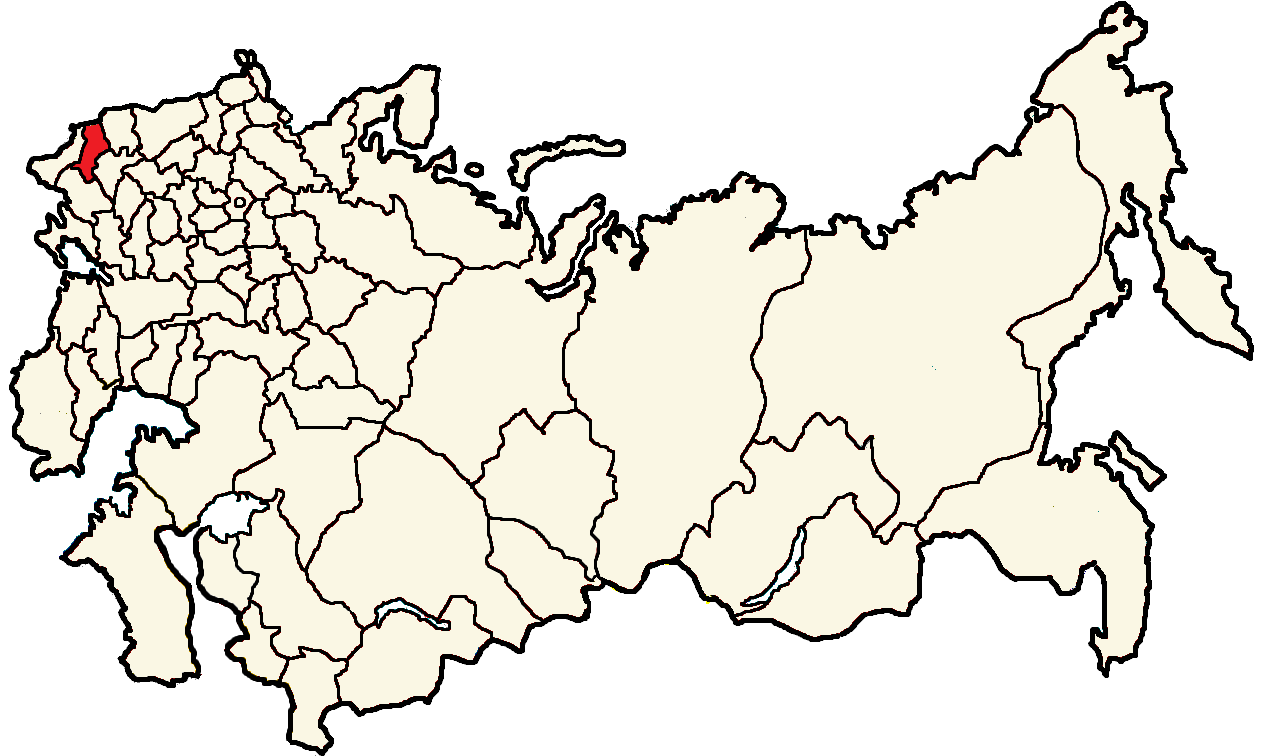
Podolia electoral district

- Dmytro Antonovych (Ukrainian Socialist Revolutionary Party, Social-Democrats, Ukrainian Peasant Union)
- Joachim Stefan Bartoszewicz (Polish Regional list)
- Panteleimon Blonskyi (Ukrainian Socialist Revolutionary Party, Social-Democrats, Ukrainian Peasant Union)
- Trokhym Verkhola (Ukrainian Socialist Revolutionary Party, Social-Democrats, Ukrainian Peasant Union)
- Petro Vidybida (Ukrainian Socialist Revolutionary Party, Social-Democrats, Ukrainian Peasant Union)
- Anton Herasymenko (Ukrainian Socialist Revolutionary Party, Social-Democrats, Ukrainian Peasant Union)
- Danylo Holovchuk (Ukrainian Socialist Revolutionary Party, Social-Democrats, Ukrainian Peasant Union)
- Nychypir Hryhoryev (Ukrainian Socialist Revolutionary Party, Social-Democrats, Ukrainian Peasant Union)
- Volodymyr Dudych (Ukrainian Socialist Revolutionary Party, Social-Democrats, Ukrainian Peasant Union)
- Avksentiy Dyachuk (Ukrainian Socialist Revolutionary Party, Social-Democrats, Ukrainian Peasant Union)
- Dmytro Isayevych (Ukrainian Socialist Revolutionary Party, Social-Democrats, Ukrainian Peasant Union)
- Mykola Lytvytskyi (Ukrainian Socialist Revolutionary Party, Social-Democrats, Ukrainian Peasant Union)
- Mykola Liubynsky (Ukrainian Socialist Revolutionary Party, Social-Democrats, Ukrainian Peasant Union)
- Volodymyr Machushenko (Ukrainian Socialist Revolutionary Party, Social-Democrats, Ukrainian Peasant Union)
- Ivan Mykolaichuk (Ukrainian Socialist Revolutionary Party, Social-Democrats, Ukrainian Peasant Union)
- Petro Tkach (Ukrainian Socialist Revolutionary Party, Social-Democrats, Ukrainian Peasant Union)
- Metodiy Shevchenko (Ukrainian Socialist Revolutionary Party, Social-Democrats, Ukrainian Peasant Union)
- Ioanykiy Shymonovych (Ukrainian Socialist Revolutionary Party, Social-Democrats, Ukrainian Peasant Union)

== Poltava ==
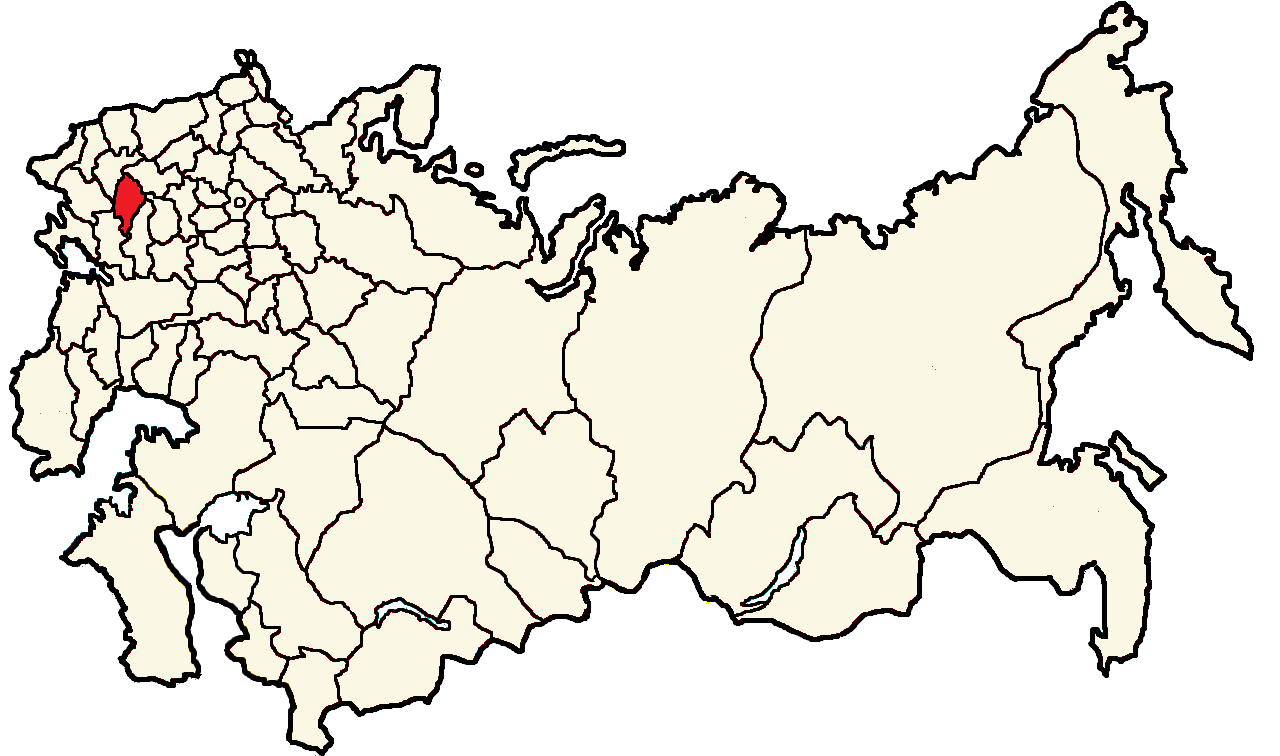
Poltava electoral district

- Nestor Galagan (Ukrainian Socialist Revolutionary Party, Ukrainian Peasant Union)
- Mykhailo Ivchenko (Ukrainian Socialist Revolutionary Party, Ukrainian Peasant Union)
- Levko Kovaliv (Ukrainian Socialist Revolutionary Party and Socialist Revolutionary Party)
- Mykola Kovalevskyi (Ukrainian Socialist Revolutionary Party, Ukrainian Peasant Union)
- Danylo Kovalenko (Ukrainian Socialist Revolutionary Party, Ukrainian Peasant Union)
- Yakiv Kulychenko (Ukrainian Socialist Revolutionary Party, Ukrainian Peasant Union)
- Nazar Petrenko (Ukrainian Socialist Revolutionary Party, Ukrainian Peasant Union)
- Mykhailo Poloz (Ukrainian Socialist Revolutionary Party and Socialist Revolutionary Party)
- Oleksandr Polotskyi (Ukrainian Socialist Revolutionary Party, Ukrainian Peasant Union)
- Tymish Semeniaha (Ukrainian Socialist Revolutionary Party, Ukrainian Peasant Union)
- Yakiv Stenka (Ukrainian Socialist Revolutionary Party, Ukrainian Peasant Union)
- Arkadiy Stepanenko (Ukrainian Socialist Revolutionary Party, Ukrainian Peasant Union)
- Yevgeniy Terletskiy (Ukrainian Socialist Revolutionary Party and Socialist Revolutionary Party)
- Oleksandr Yanko (Ukrainian Socialist Revolutionary Party, Ukrainian Peasant Union)
- Peotr Smirnov (Bolsheviks)

== Pskov ==
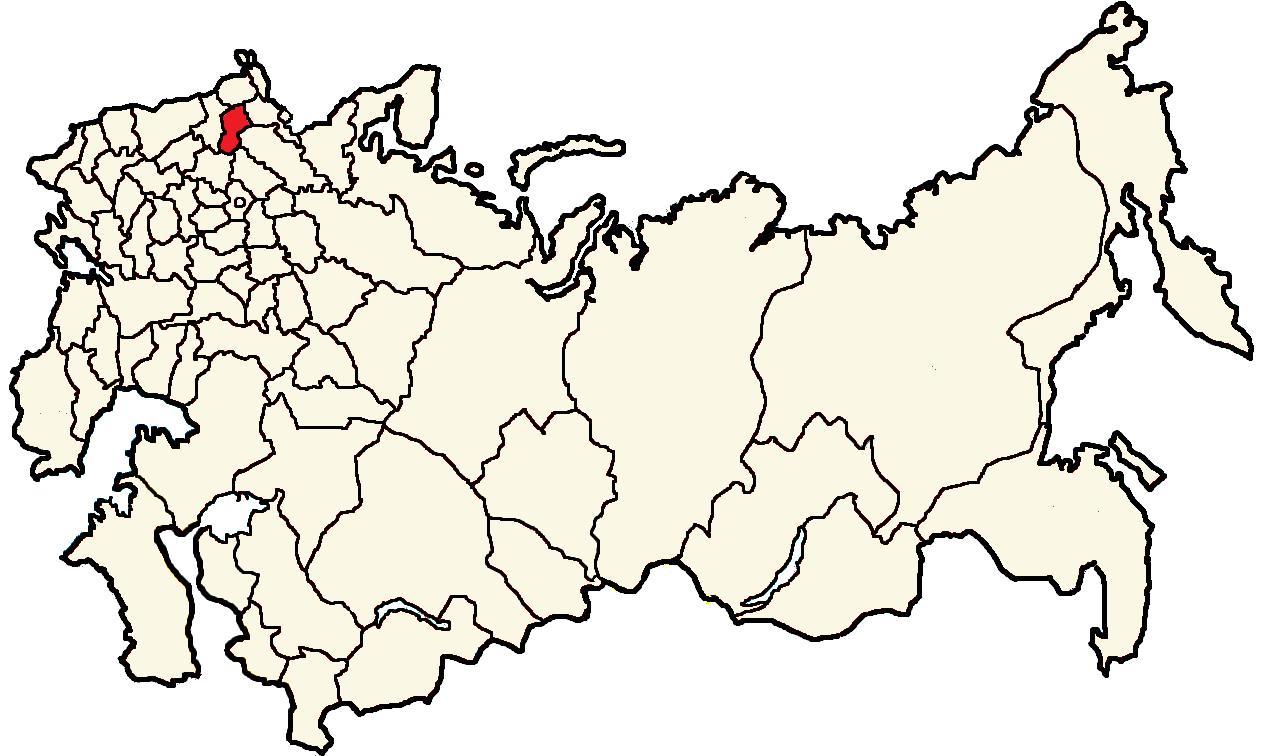
Pskov electoral district

- Leonid Bekleshov (Socialist Revolutionary Party)/Council of peasant deputies
- Adolph Joffe (Bolsheviks)
- Nikolai Olkhin (Socialist Revolutionary Party)/Council of peasant deputies
- Georgiy Pokrovskiy (Socialist Revolutionary Party)
- Mikhail Safonov (Socialist Revolutionary Party)/Council of peasant deputies
- Vasiliy Utkin (Socialist Revolutionary Party)/Council of peasant deputies
- Mikhail Usharnov (Bolsheviks)
- Andrei Okhtin (Bolsheviks)

== Ryazan ==
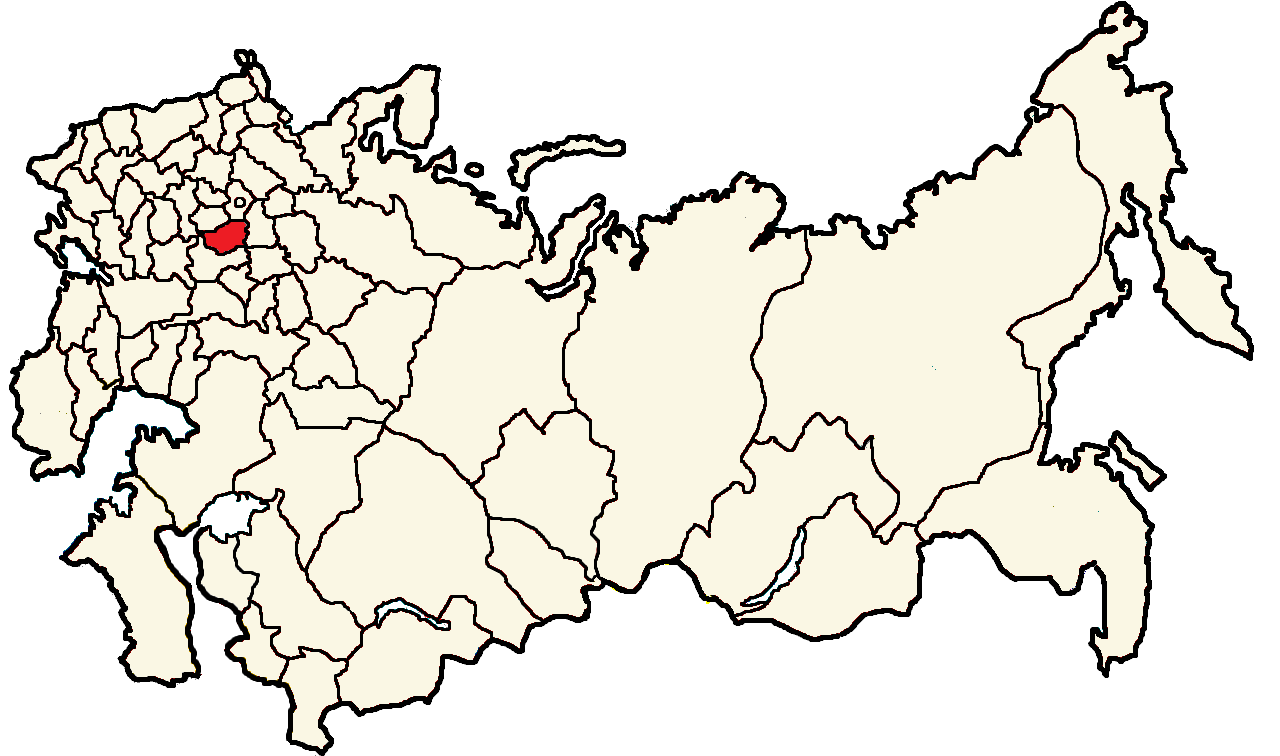
Ryazan electoral district

- Gerasim Barinov (Socialist Revolutionary Party)/Council of peasant deputies
- Mikhail Gendelman (Socialist Revolutionary Party)/Council of peasant deputies
- Nikolay Govorov (Socialist Revolutionary Party)/Council of peasant deputies
- Ivan Gorshkov (Bolsheviks)
- Valerian Osinsky (Bolsheviks)
- Feodor Pavlov (Socialist Revolutionary Party)/Council of peasant deputies
- Semyon Sereda (Bolsheviks)
- Yefim Sorokin (Socialist Revolutionary Party)/Council of peasant deputies
- Trofim Sukharev (Socialist Revolutionary Party)/Council of peasant deputies
- Mikhail Voronkov (Bolsheviks)

== Samara ==
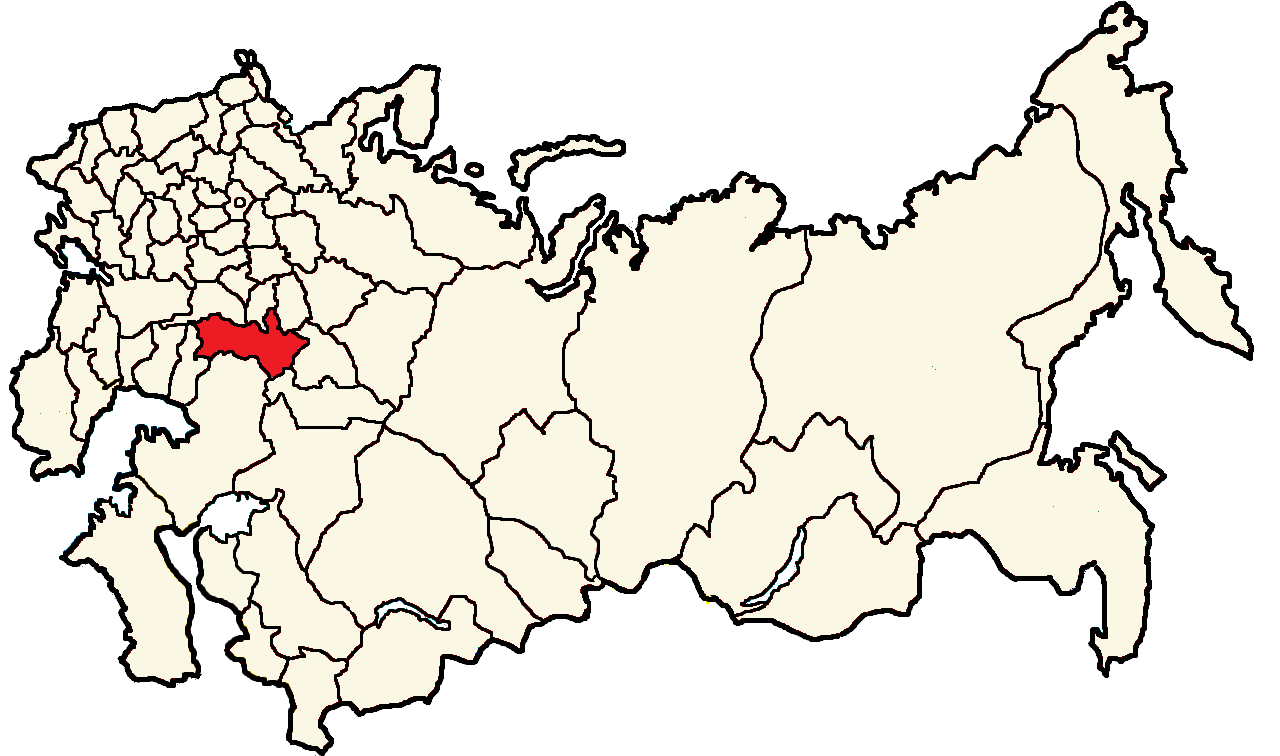
Samara electoral district

- Vasiliy Arkhangelskiy (Socialist Revolutionary Party)/Council of peasant deputies
- Aleksandr Bashkirov (Socialist Revolutionary Party)/Council of peasant deputies
- Feodor Belozeorov (Socialist Revolutionary Party)/Council of peasant deputies
- Yakov Bogoslovov (Socialist Revolutionary Party)/Council of peasant deputies
- Ivan Bruschwit (Socialist Revolutionary Party)/Council of peasant deputies
- Yakov Dedusenko (Socialist Revolutionary Party)/Council of peasant deputies
- Aleksandr Yelyashevich (Socialist Revolutionary Party)/Council of peasant deputies
- Prokopiy Klimushkin (Socialist Revolutionary Party)/Council of peasant deputies
- Valerian Kuybyshev (Bolsheviks)
- Egor Lazarev Council of peasant deputies
- Aleksandr Maslennikov (Bolsheviks)
- Pavel Maslov (Socialist Revolutionary Party)/Council of peasant deputies
- Shakir Mukhamediyarov (Muslim "Shura")
- Makhmud Tukhtarov (Muslim "Shura")
- Boris Fortunatov (Socialist Revolutionary Party)/Council of peasant deputies
- Vasiliy Chupakhin (Socialist Revolutionary Party)/Council of peasant deputies
- Veniamin Yermoschenko (Bolsheviks)

== Samarkand ==
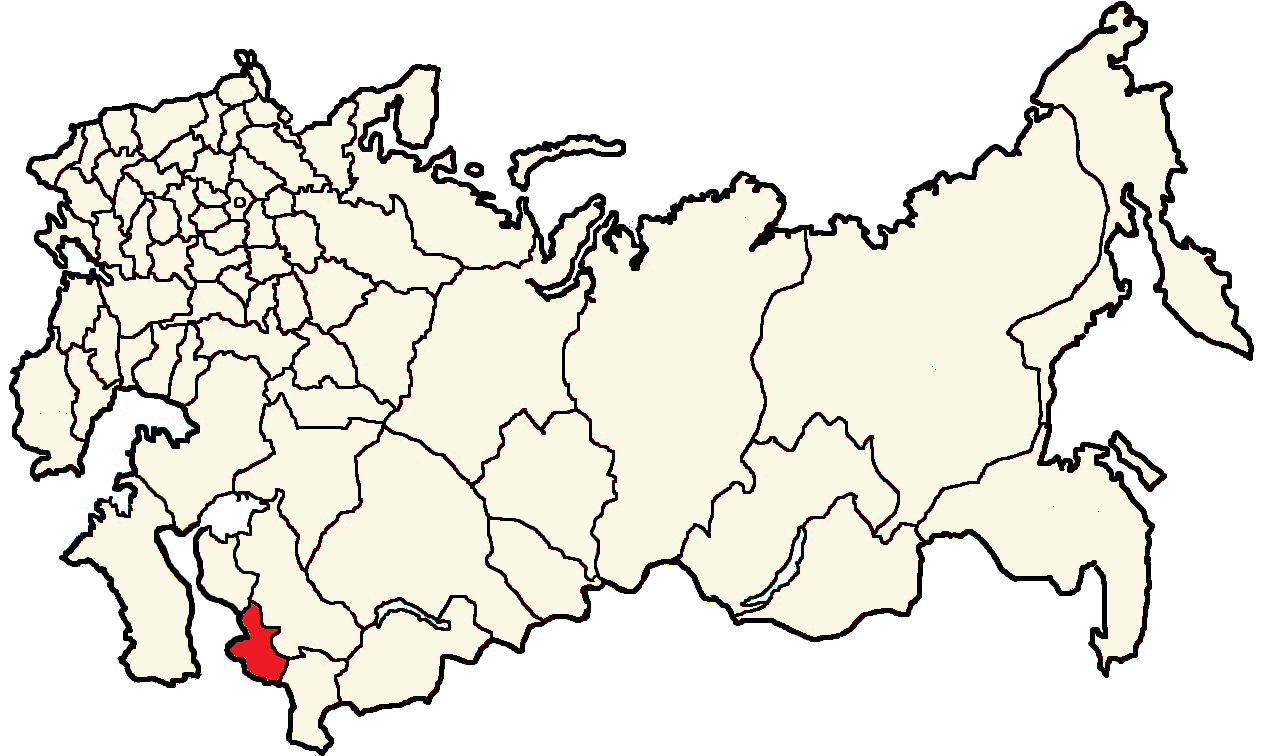
Samarkand electoral district

- Tashpulat Abdukhalilov (Muslim organizations)
- Mahmudkhodja Behbudiy (Muslim organizations)
- Sadri Maksudi Arsal (Muslim organizations)
- Piri-Kuli Mursalov (Muslim organizations)
- Abdurakhman Farkhatov (Muslim organizations)

== Saratov ==
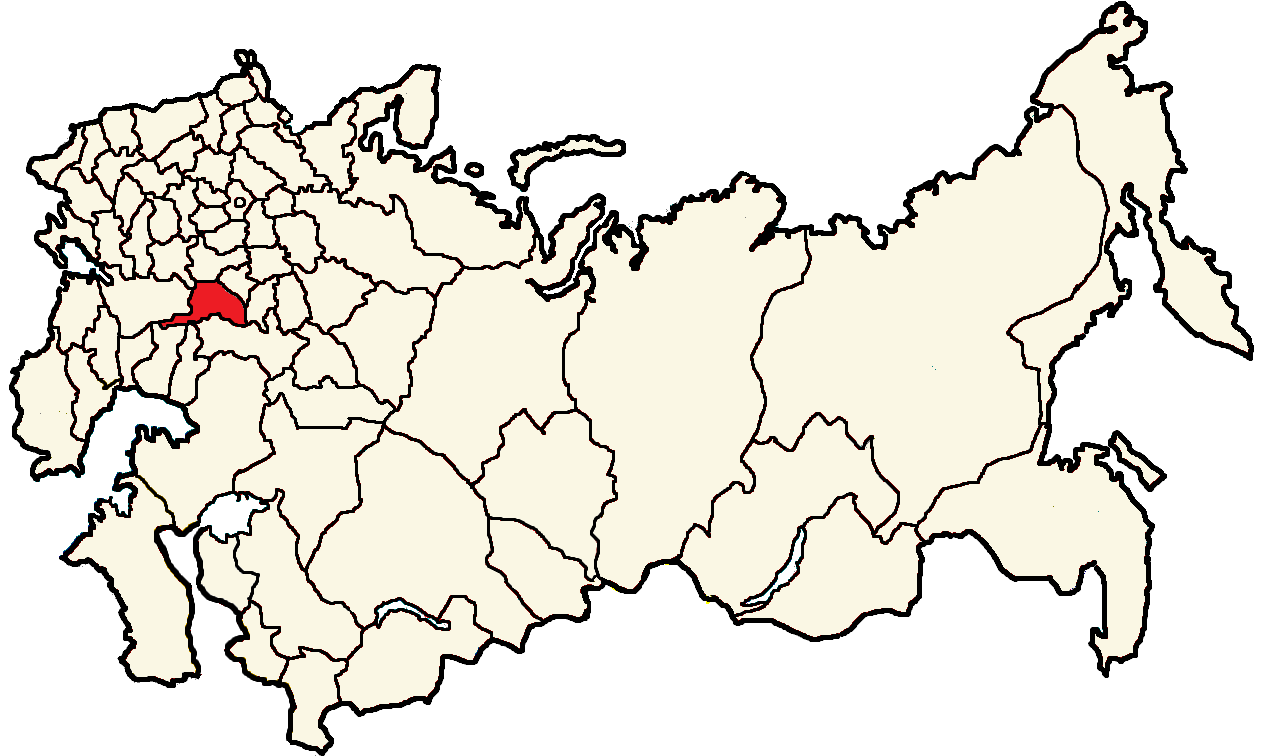
Saratov electoral district

- Naum Bykhovskiy (Socialist Revolutionary Party)/Council of peasant deputies
- Mikhail Vasilyev-Yuzhin (Bolsheviks)
- Mikhail Zatonskiy (Socialist Revolutionary Party)/Council of peasant deputies
- Alexander Kerensky (Socialist Revolutionary Party)/Council of peasant deputies (Note: Kerensky was unable to attend the only meeting in Petrograd due to the current arrest warrant by the Council of People's Commissars)
- Vladimir Milyutin (Bolsheviks)
- Aleksandr Minin (Socialist Revolutionary Party)/Council of peasant deputies
- Pavel Panchurin (Socialist Revolutionary Party)/Council of peasant deputies
- Nikolai Rakitnikov (Socialist Revolutionary Party)/Council of peasant deputies
- Aleksei Ustinov (Socialist Revolutionary Party)/Council of peasant deputies
- Boris Chernenkov (Socialist Revolutionary Party)/Council of peasant deputies
- Vladimir Antonov-Saratovsky (Bolsheviks)
- Ivan Kotov (Socialist Revolutionary Party)/Council of peasant deputies
- Sergei Minin (Bolsheviks)
- Grigoriy Ulyanov (Socialist Revolutionary Party)/Council of peasant deputies
- Aleksandr Chernavin (Socialist Revolutionary Party)/Council of peasant deputies

== Semirechensk ==
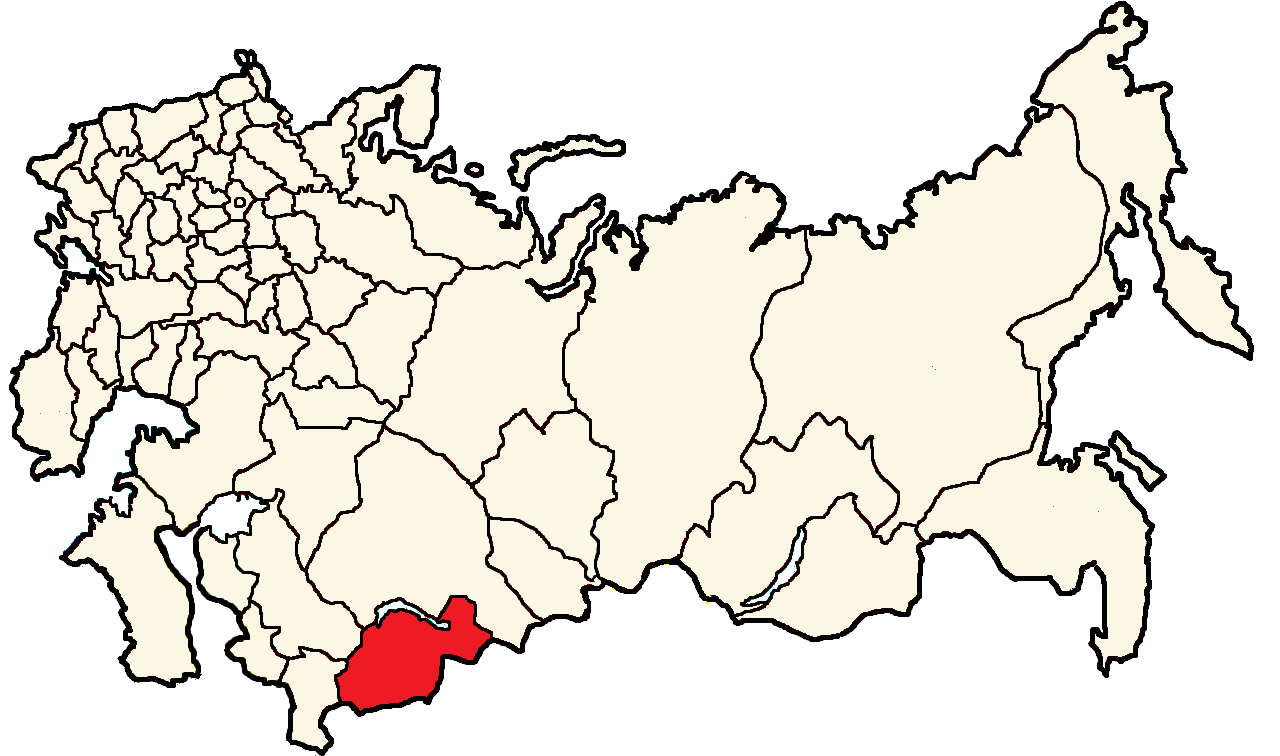
Semirechie electoral district

- Sadyk Amanzholov (Alash and Cossacks)
- Ibraim Dzhainakov (Alash and Cossacks)
- Dior Saurambaev (Alash and Cossacks)
- Mukhamedzhan Tynyshpaev (Socialists bloc)
- Peotr Shebalin (Socialists)
- Stepan Shendrikov (Alash and Cossacks)

== Simbirsk ==
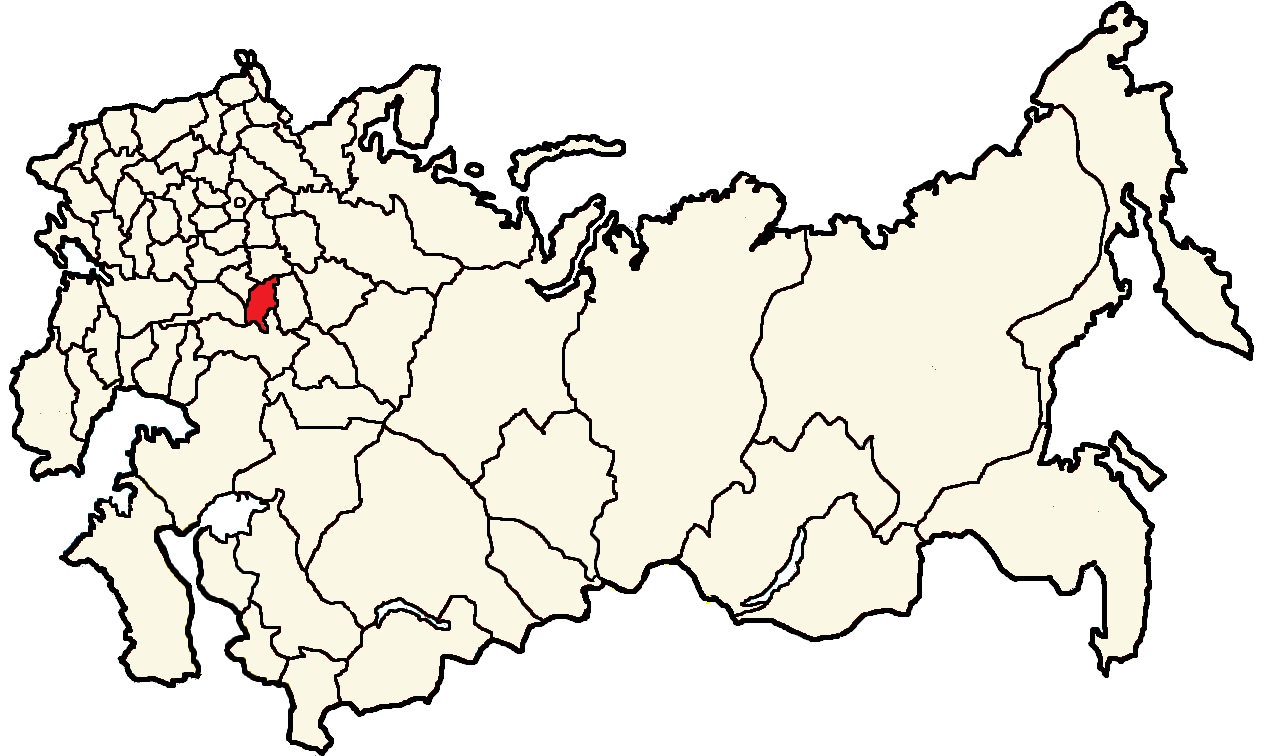
Simbirsk electoral district

- Valentin Almazov (Socialist Revolutionary Party)/Peasant Congress
- Klemetiy Vorobyeov (Socialist Revolutionary Party)/Peasant Congress
- Dmitriy Gavronskiy (Socialist Revolutionary Party)/Peasant Congress
- Pavel Moshkin (Socialist Revolutionary Party)/Peasant Congress
- Dmitriy Petrov (Socialist Revolutionary Party)/Peasant Congress
- Kirill Pochekuyev (Socialist Revolutionary Party)/Peasant Congress
- Yakov Sverdlov (Bolsheviks)
- Germogen Titov (Socialist Revolutionary Party)/Peasant Congress
- Əhməd Salikov (Muslim Party "Shura")

== Smolensk ==
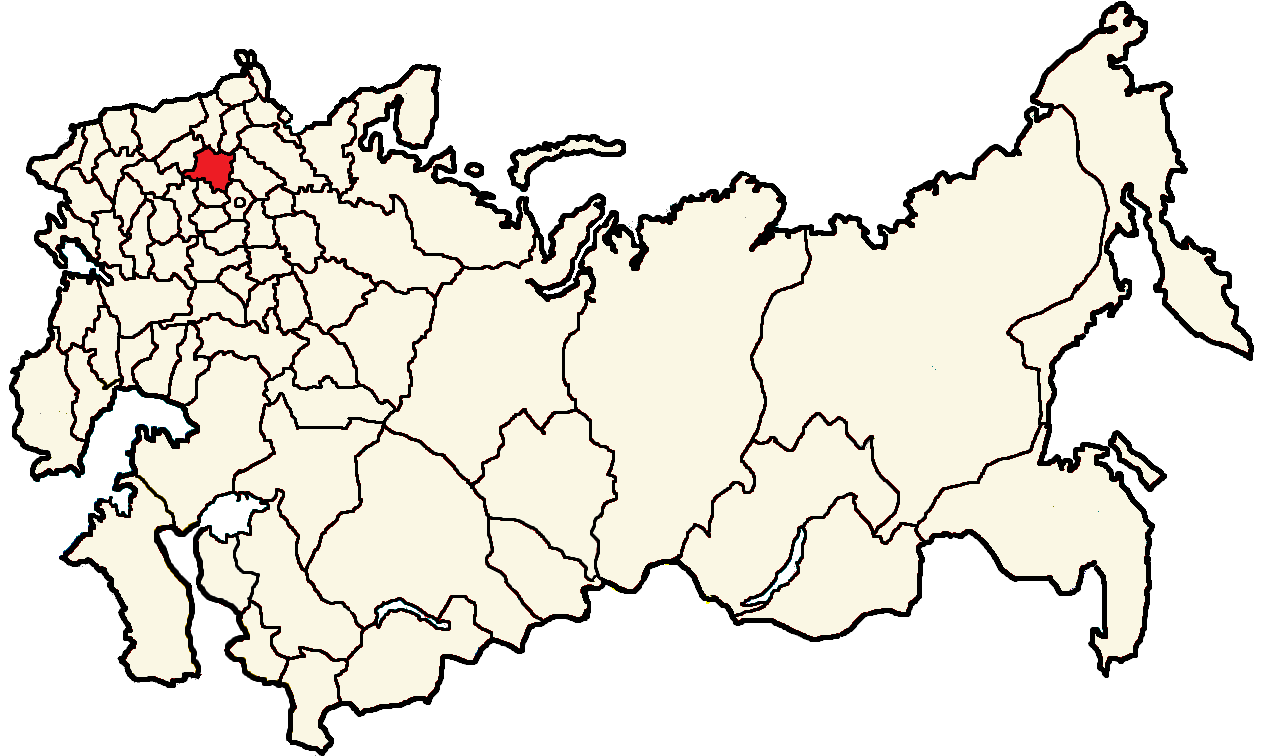
Smolensk electoral district

- Andrei Argunov (Socialist Revolutionary Party)/Council of peasant deputies
- Stanisław Bobiński (Bolsheviks)
- Mikhail Yegorov (Socialist Revolutionary Party)/Council of peasant deputies
- Semeon Ivanov (Bolsheviks)
- Georgiy Kutuzov (Socialist Revolutionary Party)/Council of peasant deputies
- Julian Leszczyński (Bolsheviks)
- Anatoly Lunacharsky (Bolsheviks)
- Viktor Podvitskiy (Socialist Revolutionary Party)/Council of peasant deputies
- Mikhail Pokrovsky (Bolsheviks)
- Mikhail Remizov (Bolsheviks)
- Gerasim Ovsianik (Bolsheviks)

== Stavropol ==
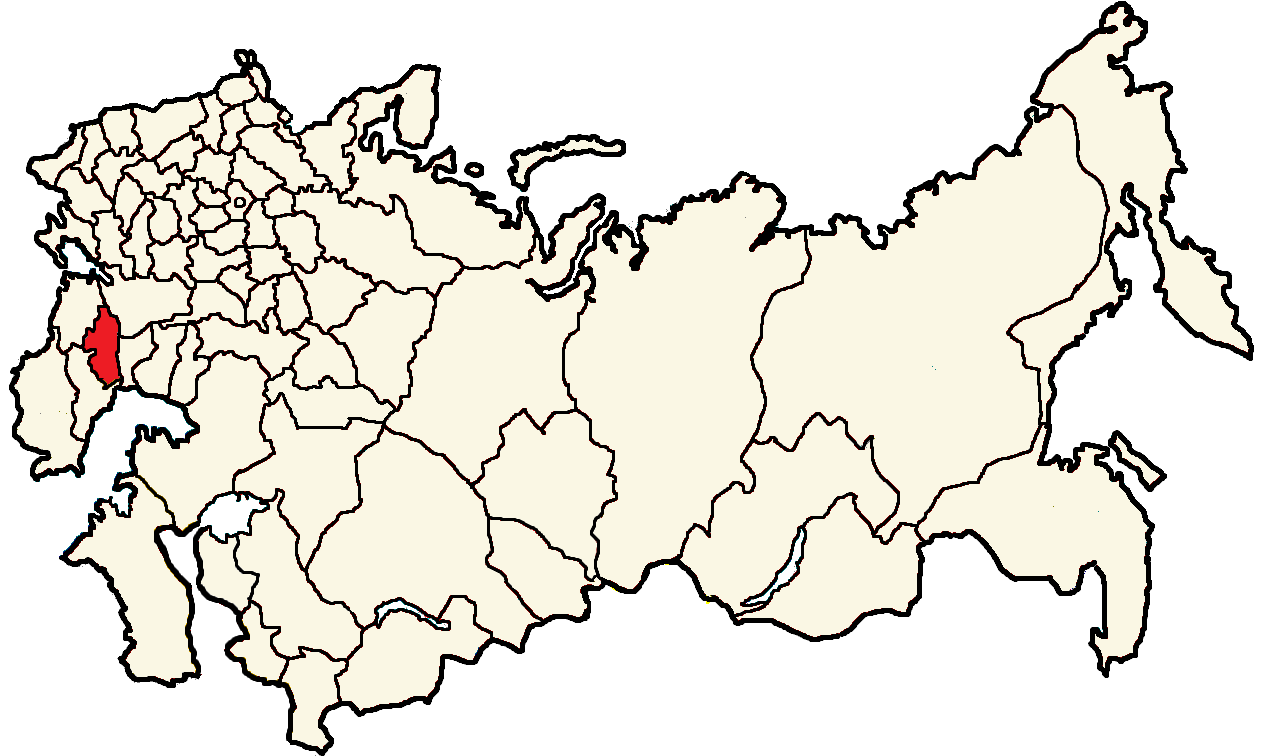
Stavropol electoral district

- Mikhail Bocharnikov (Socialist Revolutionary Party)/Council of peasant deputies
- Filipp Garnitskiy (Socialist Revolutionary Party)/Council of peasant deputies
- Aleksandr Gutorov (Socialist Revolutionary Party)/Council of peasant deputies
- Yevgeniy Dementyev (Socialist Revolutionary Party)/Council of peasant deputies
- Grigoriy Yemelyanov (Socialist Revolutionary Party)/Council of peasant deputies
- Fedot Onipko (Socialist Revolutionary Party)/Council of peasant deputies

== Tambov ==
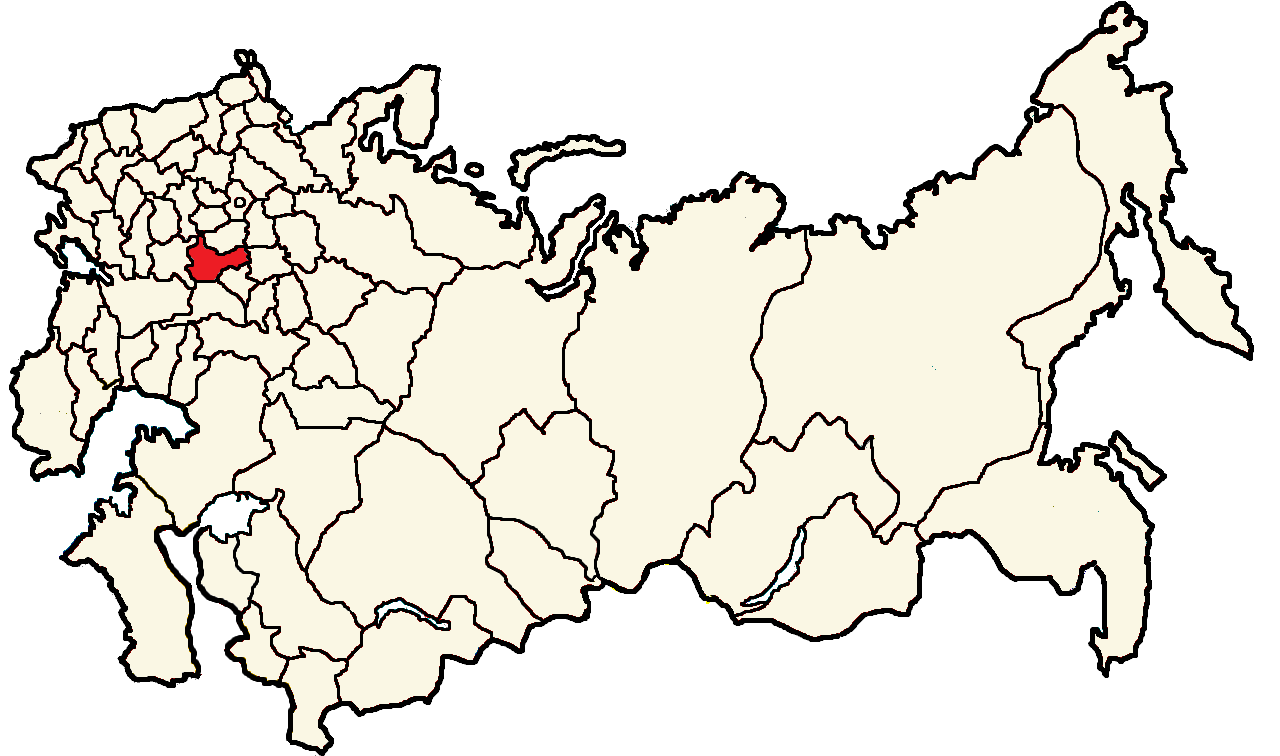
Tambov electoral district

- Semeon Batmanov (Socialist Revolutionary Party)/Council of peasant deputies
- Nikolay Babynin (Socialist Revolutionary Party)/Council of peasant deputies
- Mikhail Volskiy (Socialist Revolutionary Party)/Council of peasant deputies
- Peotr Ilyin (Socialist Revolutionary Party)/Council of peasant deputies
- Vasiliy Kiseleov (Socialist Revolutionary Party)/Council of peasant deputies
- Georgiy Kondratenkov (Socialist Revolutionary Party)/Council of peasant deputies
- Yefrem Merkulov (Socialist Revolutionary Party)/Council of peasant deputies
- Boris Moiseyev (Bolsheviks)
- Ivan Nabatov (Socialist Revolutionary Party)/Council of peasant deputies
- Feodor Nemtinov (Socialist Revolutionary Party)/Council of peasant deputies
- Adrian Odintsov (Socialist Revolutionary Party)/Council of peasant deputies
- Mikhail Olminsky (Bolsheviks)
- Ivan Riabov (Socialist Revolutionary Party)/Council of peasant deputies
- Anastasia Sletova-Chernova (Socialist Revolutionary Party)/Council of peasant deputies
- Viktor Chernov (Socialist Revolutionary Party)/Council of peasant deputies
- Feodor Chernysheov (Socialist Revolutionary Party)/Council of peasant deputies
- Alexander Schlichter (Bolsheviks)

== Taurida ==
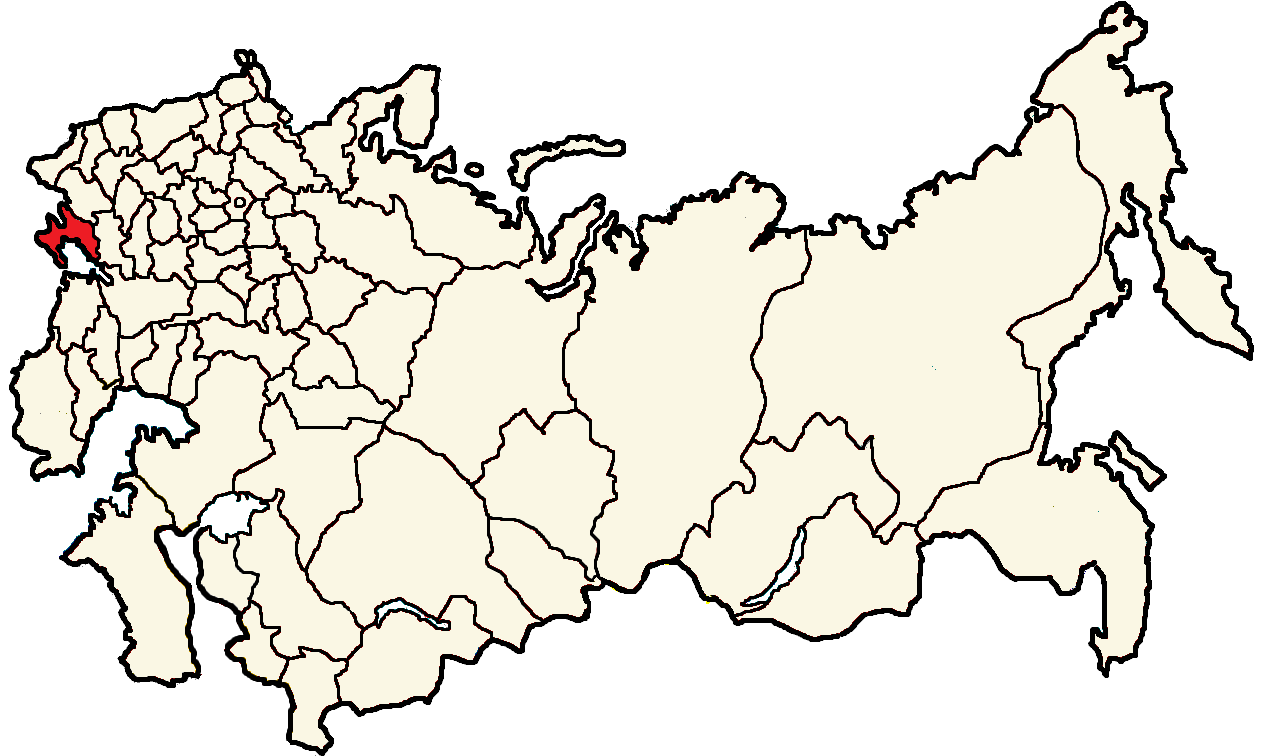
Taurida electoral district

- Nikolay Aliasov (Socialist Revolutionary Party)/Council of peasant deputies
- Vasiliy Bakuta (Socialist Revolutionary Party)/Council of peasant deputies
- Nikolay Bogdanov (National Freedom)
- Peotr Bondar (Socialist Revolutionary Party)/Council of peasant deputies
- Samuil Zak (Socialist Revolutionary Party)/Council of peasant deputies
- Sergei Nikonov (Socialist Revolutionary Party)/Council of peasant deputies
- Ivan Popov (Socialist Revolutionary Party)/Council of peasant deputies
- Cafer Seydamet (Provisional Crimean Muslim Executive Committee)
- Peotr Tolstov (Socialist Revolutionary Party)/Council of peasant deputies
- Mykola Saltan (Ukrainian Social Revolutionary Party)

== Tobolsk ==
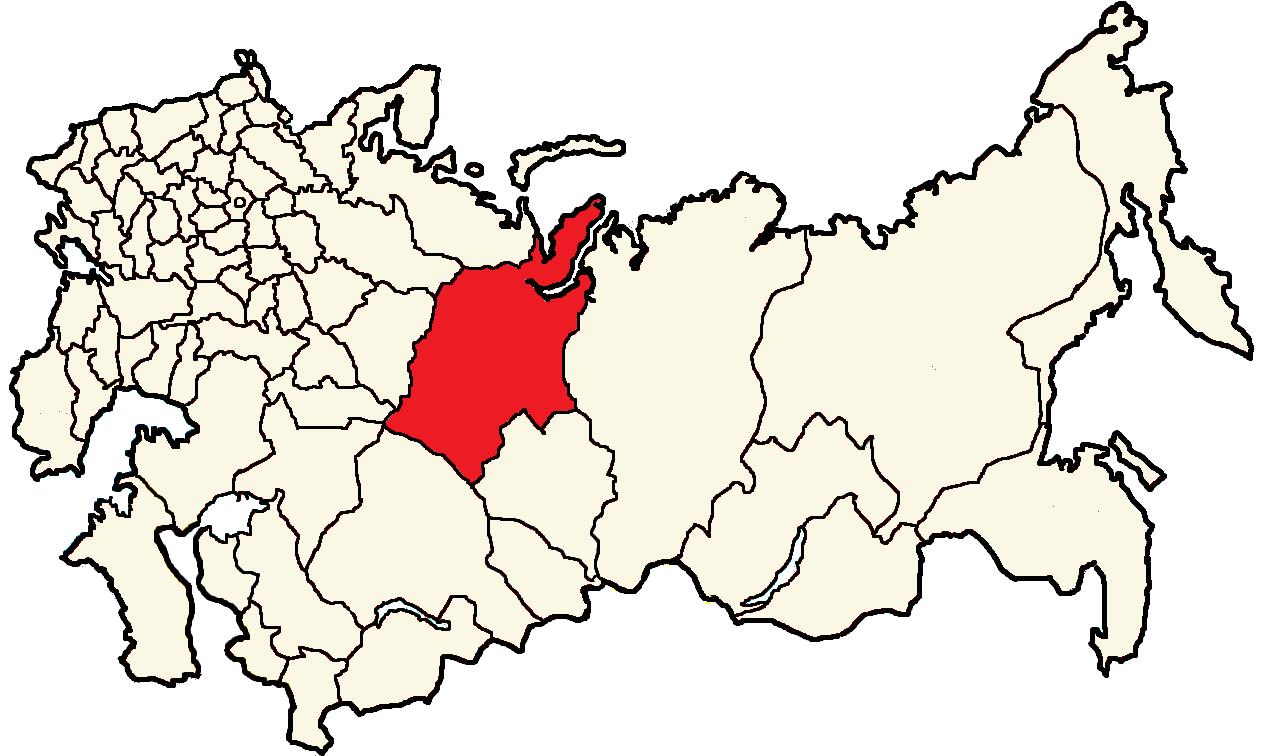
Tobolsk electoral district

- Stepan Gultiayev (Socialist Revolutionary Party)/Congress of peasant deputies
- Kuzma Yevdokimov (Socialist Revolutionary Party)/Congress of peasant deputies
- Aleksandr Ivanitskiy-Vasilenko (Socialist Revolutionary Party)/Congress of peasant deputies
- Dmitriy Kotelnikov (Socialist Revolutionary Party)/Congress of peasant deputies
- Aleksandr Krasnousov (Socialist Revolutionary Party)/Congress of peasant deputies
- Iosif Mikhailov (Socialist Revolutionary Party)/Congress of peasant deputies
- Aleksei Mukhin (Socialist Revolutionary Party)/Congress of peasant deputies
- Aleksei Sukhanov (National-Socialists)/Congress of peasant deputies
- Pavel Sukhanov (Socialist Revolutionary Party)/Congress of peasant deputies
- Trofim Barantsev (Socialist Revolutionary Party)/Congress of peasant deputies

== Tomsk ==
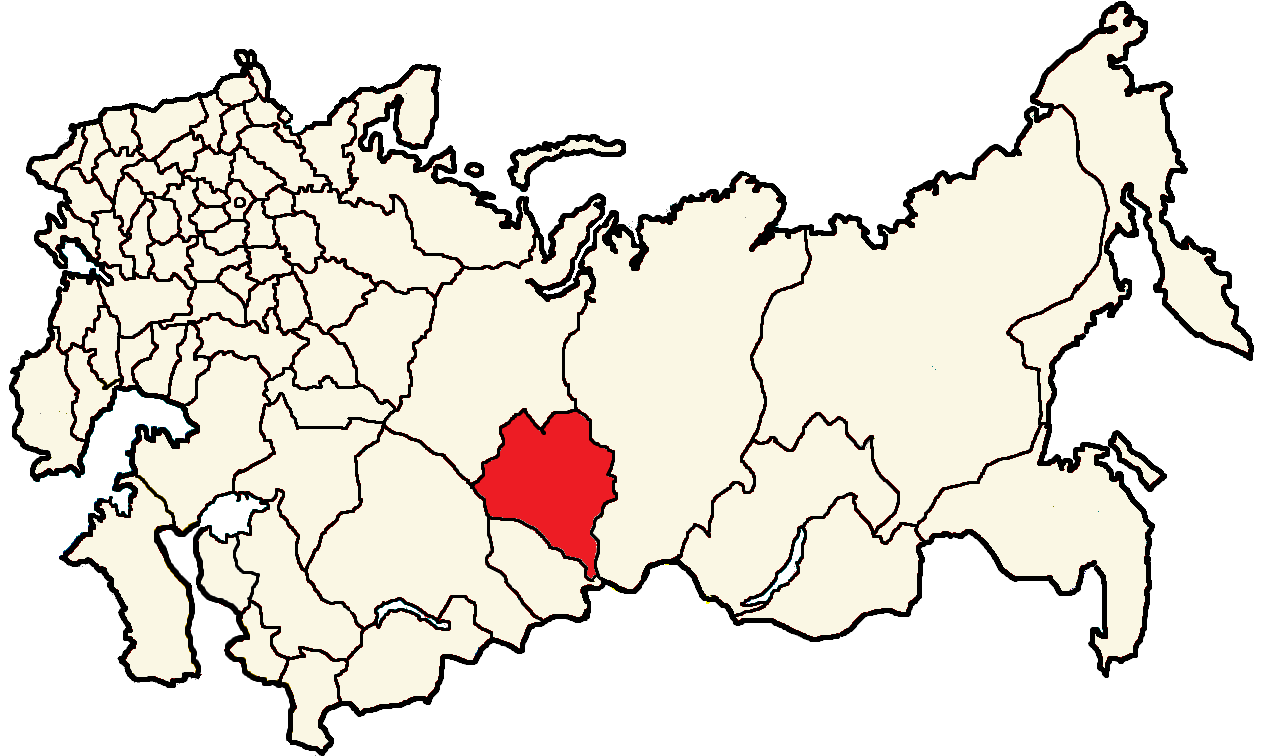
Tomsk electoral district

- Loggin Grigoryev (Socialist Revolutionary Party)
- Mikhail Lindberg (Socialist Revolutionary Party)
- Boris Markov (Socialist Revolutionary Party)
- Gavriil Markov (Socialist Revolutionary Party)
- Pavel Mikhailov (Socialist Revolutionary Party)
- Mikhail Omelkov (Socialist Revolutionary Party)
- Arseniy Lisiyenko (Socialist Revolutionary Party)
- Ivan Smirnov (Bolsheviks)
- Vasiliy Sukhomlyn (Socialist Revolutionary Party)
- Innokentiy Shisharin (Socialist Revolutionary Party)

== Transbaikal ==
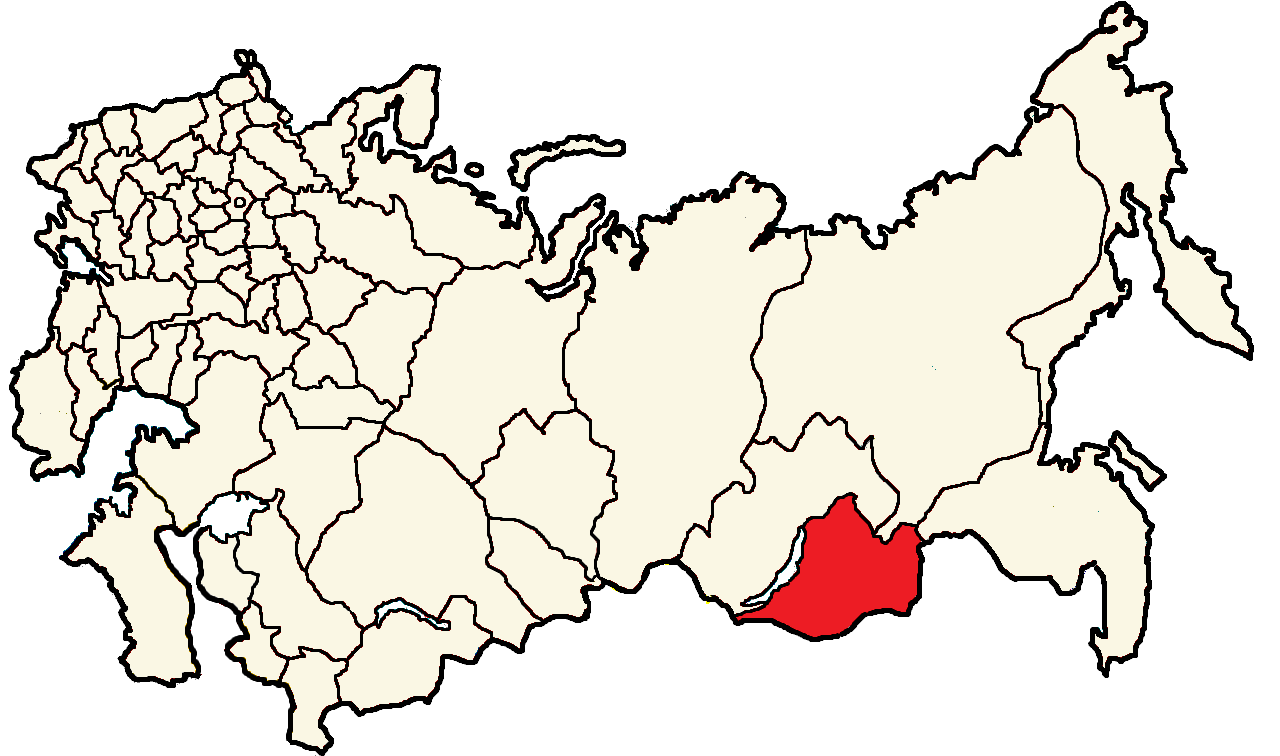
Transbaikal electoral district

- Mikhail Bogdanov (Burnatskom)
- Apollon Kruglikov (Socialist Revolutionary Party)
- Nikolai Pumpianskiy (Socialist Revolutionary Party)
- Aleksandr Dobromyslov (Socialist Revolutionary Party)
- Khrisanf Simakov (Socialist Revolutionary Party)
- Sergey Taskin (Cossacks)
- Anton Flegontov (Socialist Revolutionary Party)

== Transcaucasus ==
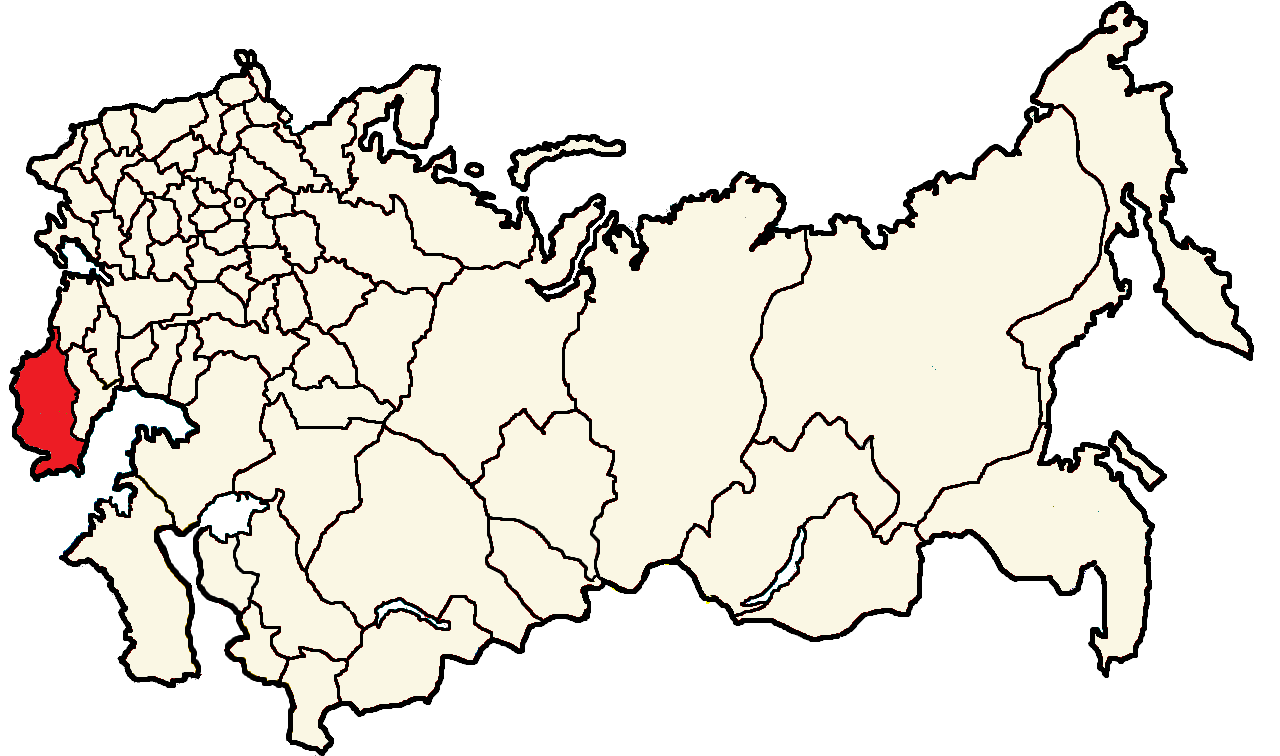
Transcaucasus electoral district

- Hasan bey Aghayev (Musavat)/Muslin national committee
- Kosta Ambartsumian (Dashnaktsutyun)
- Ibrahim Gaydarov Muslim Socialist Bloc
- Evgeni Gegechkori (Mensheviks)
- Mammad Yusif Jafarov (Musavat)/Muslin national committee
- Noe Zhordania (Mensheviks)
- Hakob Zavriev (Dashnaktsutyun)
- Stepan Zorian (Dashnaktsutyun)
- Arshak Zurabov (Mensheviks)
- Elixan Qantemir Muslim Socialist Bloc
- Valerian Lunkevich (Socialist Revolutionary Party)
- Mikayel Varandian (Dashnaktsutyun)
- Hamo Ohanjanyan (Dashnaktsutyun)
- Isidore Ramishvili (Mensheviks)
- Noe Ramishvili (Mensheviks)
- Mahammad Amin Rasulzade (Musavat)/Muslin national committee
- Matvey Skobelev (Mensheviks)
- Sultan Məcid Qənizadə (Muslims of Russia)
- Khosrov bey Sultanov (Musavat)/Muslin national committee
- Alimardan bey Topchubashov (Musavat)/Muslin national committee
- Nasib bey Yusifbeyli (Musavat)/Muslin national committee
- Irakli Tsereteli (Mensheviks)
- Nikolay Chkheidze (Mensheviks)
- Akaki Chkhenkeli (Mensheviks)
- Stepan Shaumian (Bolsheviks)
- Avetis Shakhatunian (Dashnaktsutyun)
- Levon Atabekian (Socialist Revolutionary Party)
- Əsədulla Axundov (Mensheviks-Gummet)
- Iosif Bekzadian (Mensheviks)
- Koriun Gazazian (Dashnaktsutyun)
- Grigol Giorgadze (Mensheviks)
- Vladimir Dzhibladze (Mensheviks)
- Aleksandr Lomtatidze (Mensheviks)
- Qazı Əhməd Məhəmmədbəyov (Musavat)/Muslin national committee
- Aslan bey Safikurdski Muslim Socialist Bloc
- Mikhail Smirnov (Mensheviks)
- Hovhannes Kajaznuni (Dashnaktsutyun)
- Sirakan Tigranyan (Dashnaktsutyun)
- Sargis Araratyan (Dashnaktsutyun)
- Aslan bey Gardashov (Musavat)/Muslin national committee
- Mustafa Mahmudov (Musavat)/Muslin national committee
- Mir Hidayət Seyidov (Musavat)/Muslin national committee

== Tula ==
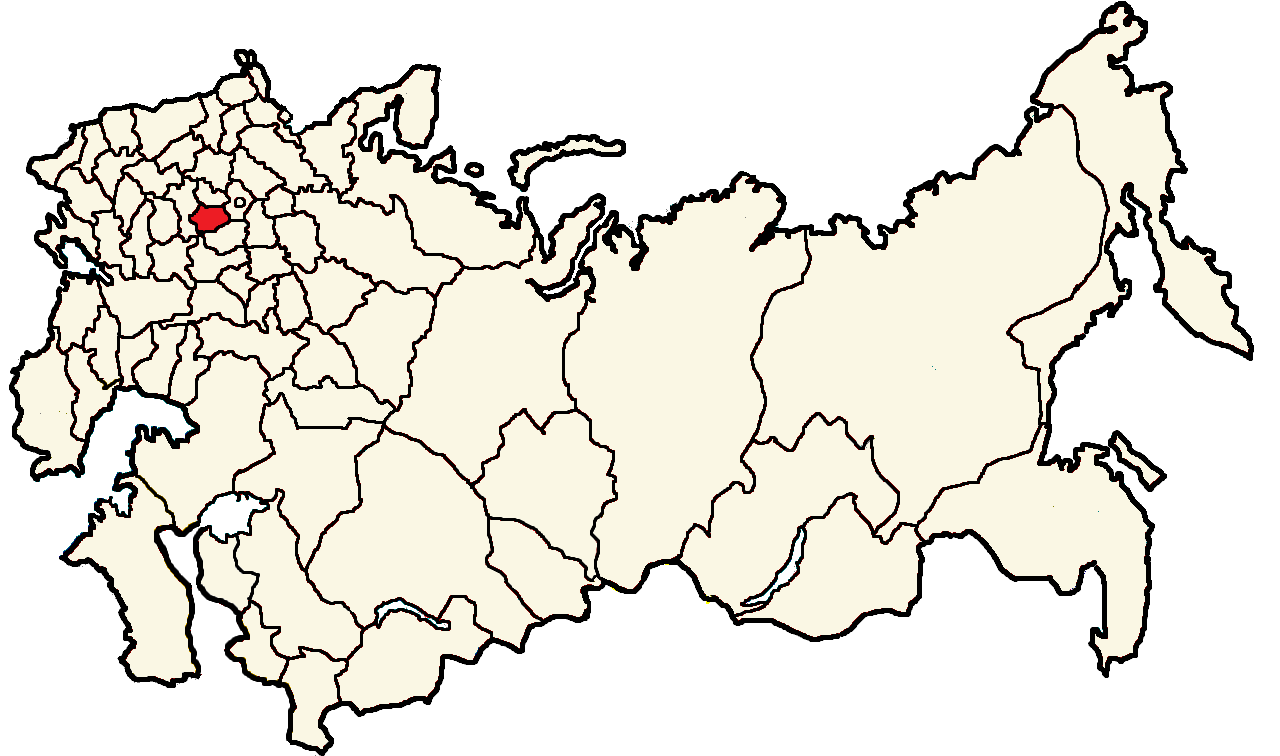
Tula electoral district

- Boris Arvatov (Socialist Revolutionary Party)/Council of peasant and military-peasant deputies
- Vissarion Gurevich (Socialist Revolutionary Party)/Council of peasant and military-peasant deputies
- Grigory Kaminsky Revolutionary Social-Democratic blocs
- Aleksandr Kaul Revolutionary Social-Democratic blocs
- Vasiliy Medvedev (Socialist Revolutionary Party)/Council of peasant and military-peasant deputies
- Grigoriy Nearonov (Socialist Revolutionary Party)/Council of peasant and military-peasant deputies
- Varvara Yakovleva (Bolsheviks)
- Sergei Kolesnikov (Revolutionary social-democrats Bolsheviks)

== Turgai ==
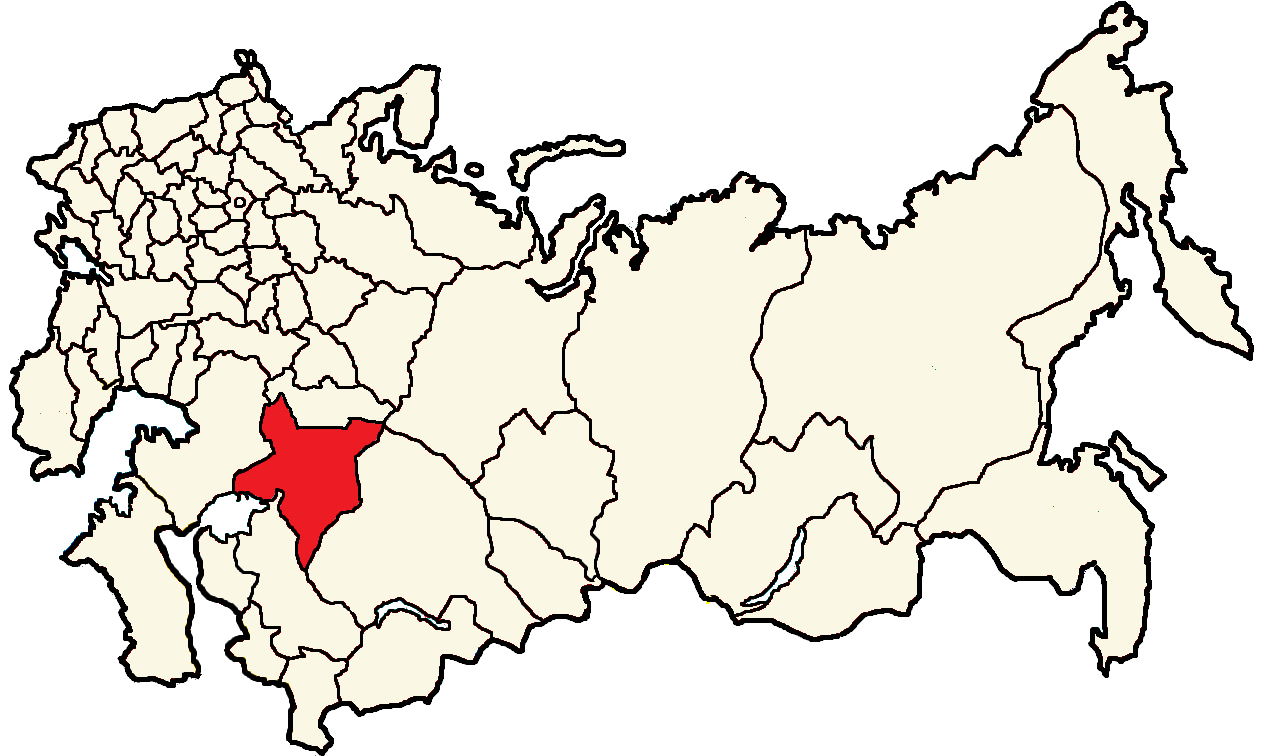
Turgai electoral district

- Ahmet Baitursynuly (Alash)
- Akhmet Beremzhanov (Alash)
- Sagydyk Doszhanov (Alash)
- Iosif Pakhomov (Socialist Revolutionary Party)/Council of peasant deputies
- Abdulla Temirov (Alash)

== Tver ==
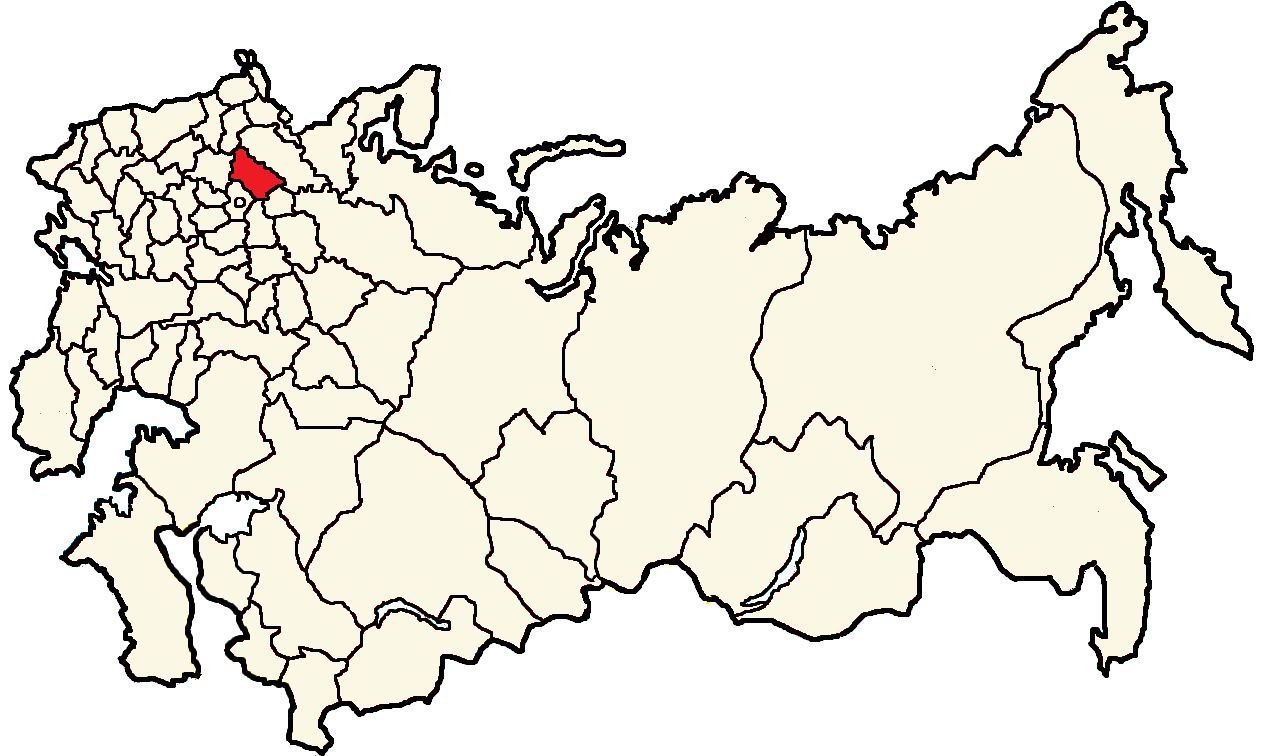
Tver electoral district

- Aleksandr Arosev (Bolsheviks)
- Aleksandr Vagzhanov (Bolsheviks)
- Vladimir Vol'skii (Socialist Revolutionary Party)/Council of peasant deputies
- Andrei Medov (Bolsheviks)
- Grigory Sokolnikov (Bolsheviks)
- Grigoriy Sokolnikov (Bolsheviks)
- Konstantin Tikhomirov (Socialist Revolutionary Party)/Council of peasant deputies
- Vasily Schmidt (Bolsheviks)
- Vasiliy Tolmachevskiy (Socialist Revolutionary Party)/Council of peasant deputies
- Dmitriy Bulatov (Bolsheviks)

== Ufa ==
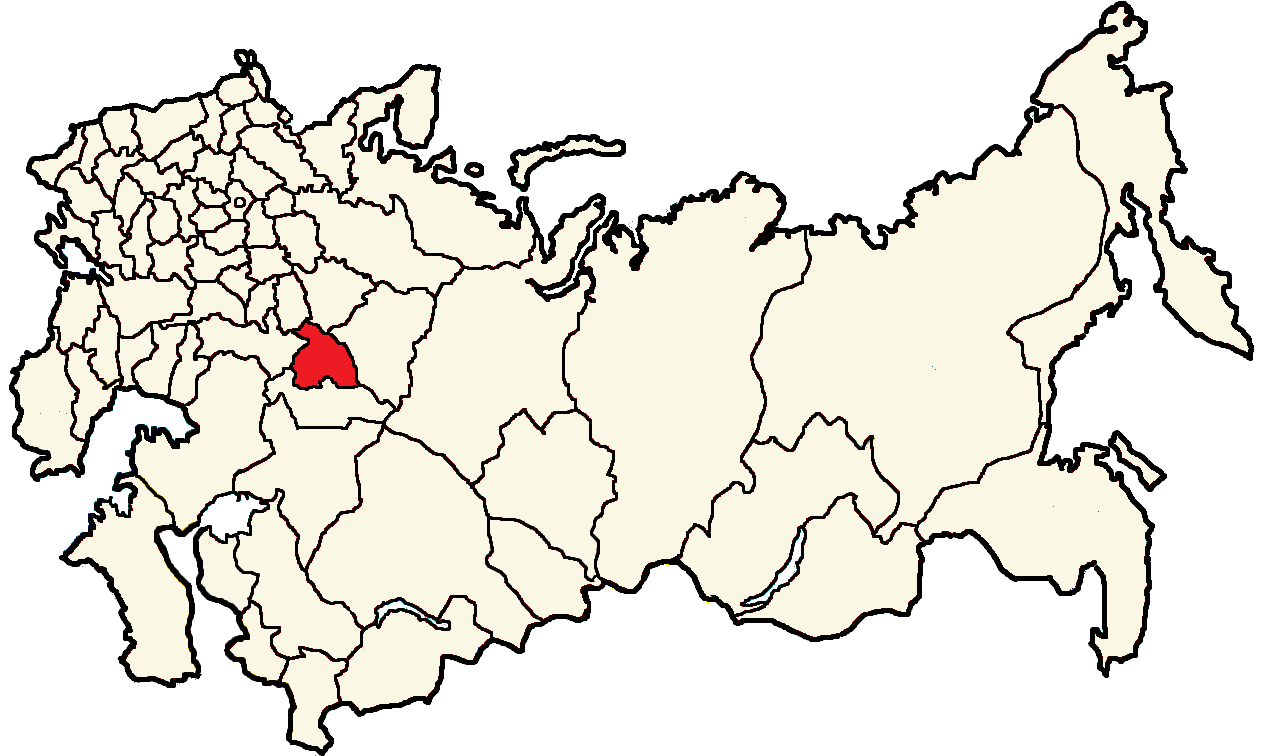
Ufa electoral district

- Mukhiayetdin Akhmerov Council of peasant deputies
- Aleksandr Brilliantov (Socialist Revolutionary Party)/Council of peasant deputies
- Zeki Velidi Togan (Bashkirs-Federalists)
- Ğalimcan İbrahimof Council of peasant deputies
- Gizatulla Ilyasov Council of peasant deputies
- Akhmetdin Mukhametdinov Council of peasant deputies
- Nikolai Osintsev (Socialist Revolutionary Party)/Council of peasant deputies
- Şərif Sönçələyev Council of peasant deputies
- Gumer Teregulov (Muslim National Council)
- Vladimir Trutovskiy (Socialist Revolutionary Party)/Council of peasant deputies
- Vasiliy Filatov (Socialist Revolutionary Party)/Council of peasant deputies
- Isaac Steinberg (Socialist Revolutionary Party)/Council of peasant deputies
- Gumer Kuvatov (Bashkirs-Federalists)

== Ural ==
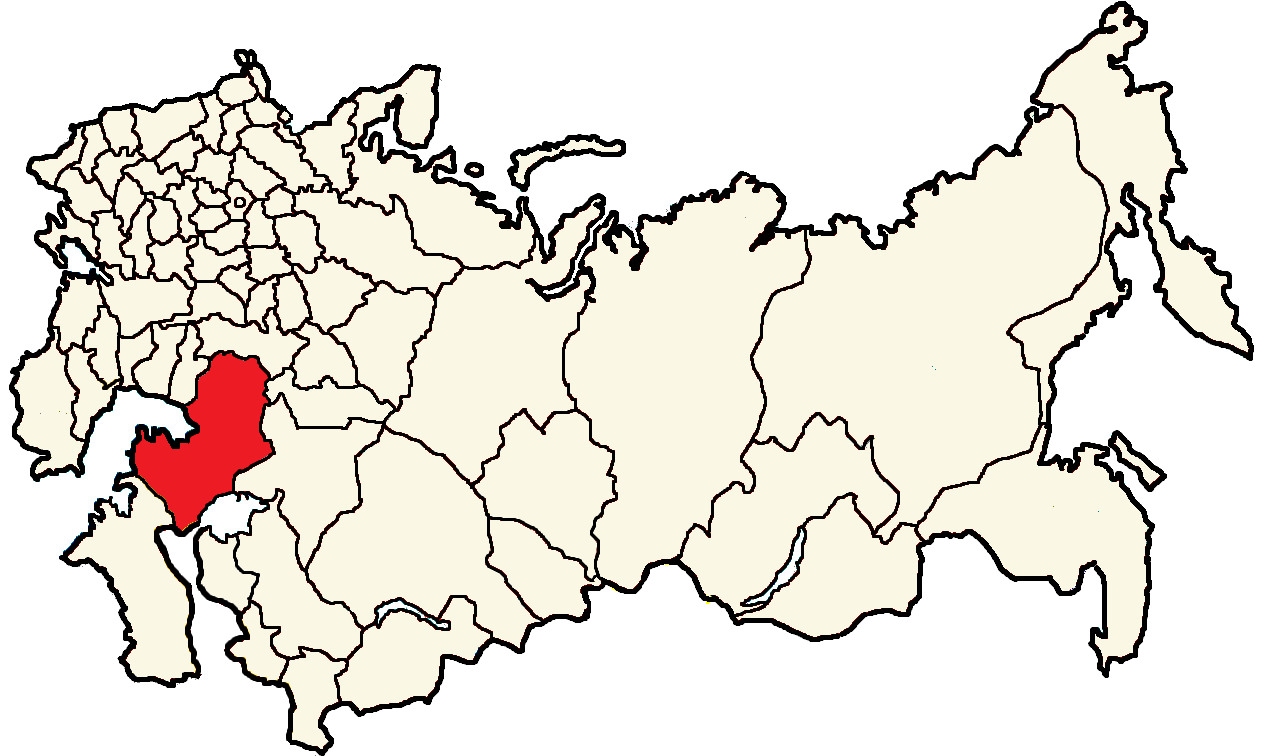
Ural electoral district

- Gubaidulla Alibekov (Kirghiz Committee)
- Nicholas A. Borodin (Cossacks)
- Grigoriy Volosov (Socialist Revolutionary Party)/Council of peasant deputies
- Jahansha Dosmuxamedov (Kirghiz Committee)
- Xalel Dosmuxamedov (Kirghiz Committee)
- Nurgali Ipmagambetov (Kirghiz Committee)
- Salimgirey Karatleuv (Kirghiz Committee)

== Viatka ==
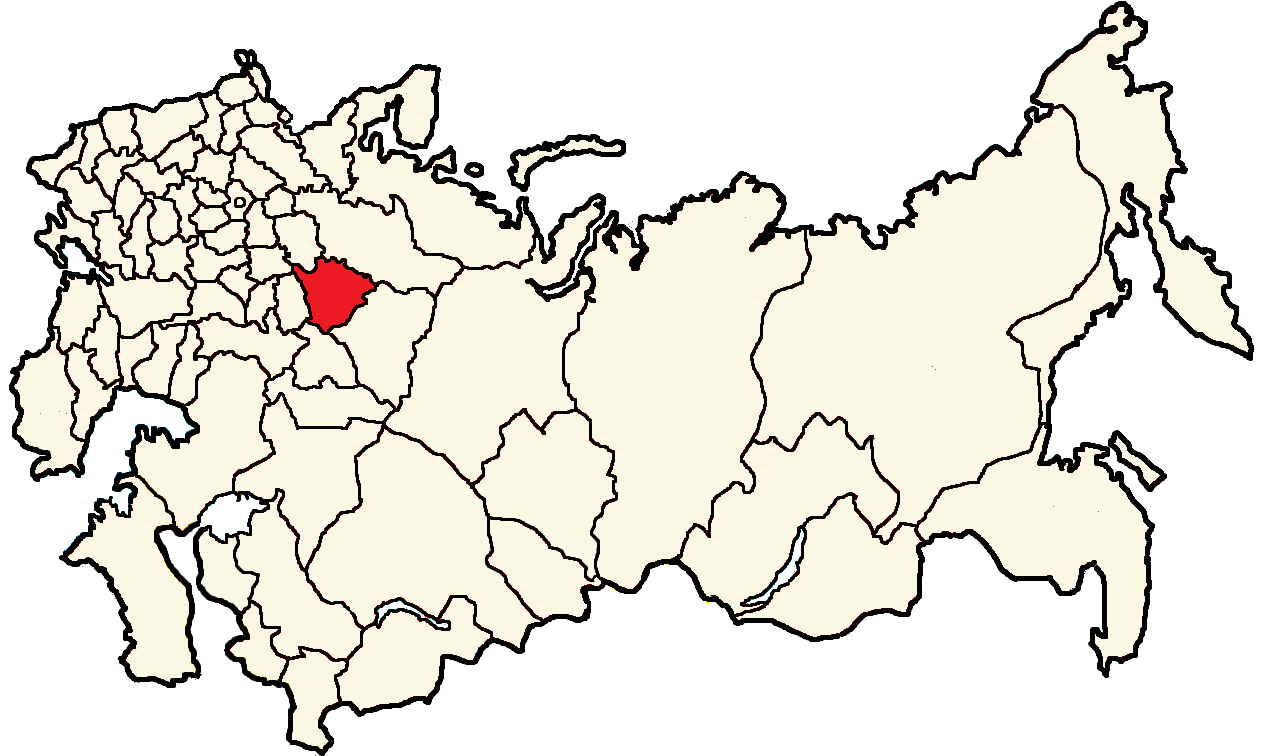
Viatka electoral district

- Dmitriy Biriukov (Socialist Revolutionary Party)/Council of peasant deputies
- Vasiliy Buzanov (Socialist Revolutionary Party)/Congress of peasant deputies
- Panteleimon Vikhliayev (Socialist Revolutionary Party)/Congress of peasant deputies
- Nikolay Yevseyev (Socialist Revolutionary Party)/Congress of peasant deputies
- Lavr Yefremov (Socialist Revolutionary Party)/Congress of peasant deputies
- Boris Zbarskiy (Socialist Revolutionary Party)/Congress of peasant deputies
- Aleksandr Kropotov (Socialist Revolutionary Party)/Congress of peasant deputies
- Ivan Kuznetsov (Socialist Revolutionary Party)/Congress of peasant deputies
- Ivan Pastukhov (Bolsheviks)
- Ivan Popov (Bolsheviks)
- Peotr Salamatov (Socialist Revolutionary Party)/Congress of peasant deputies
- Aleksandrs Spunde (Bolsheviks)
- Nikolai Tchaikovsky (National Socialist and National Union of Cheremis)
- Konstantin Shulakov (Socialist Revolutionary Party)/Congress of peasant deputies
- Vasiliy Golovizin (Socialist Revolutionary Party)/Congress of peasant deputies
- Ivan Shvetsov (Bolsheviks)
- Sahib-Girey Yambaev (Muslim Congress)

== Vitebsk ==
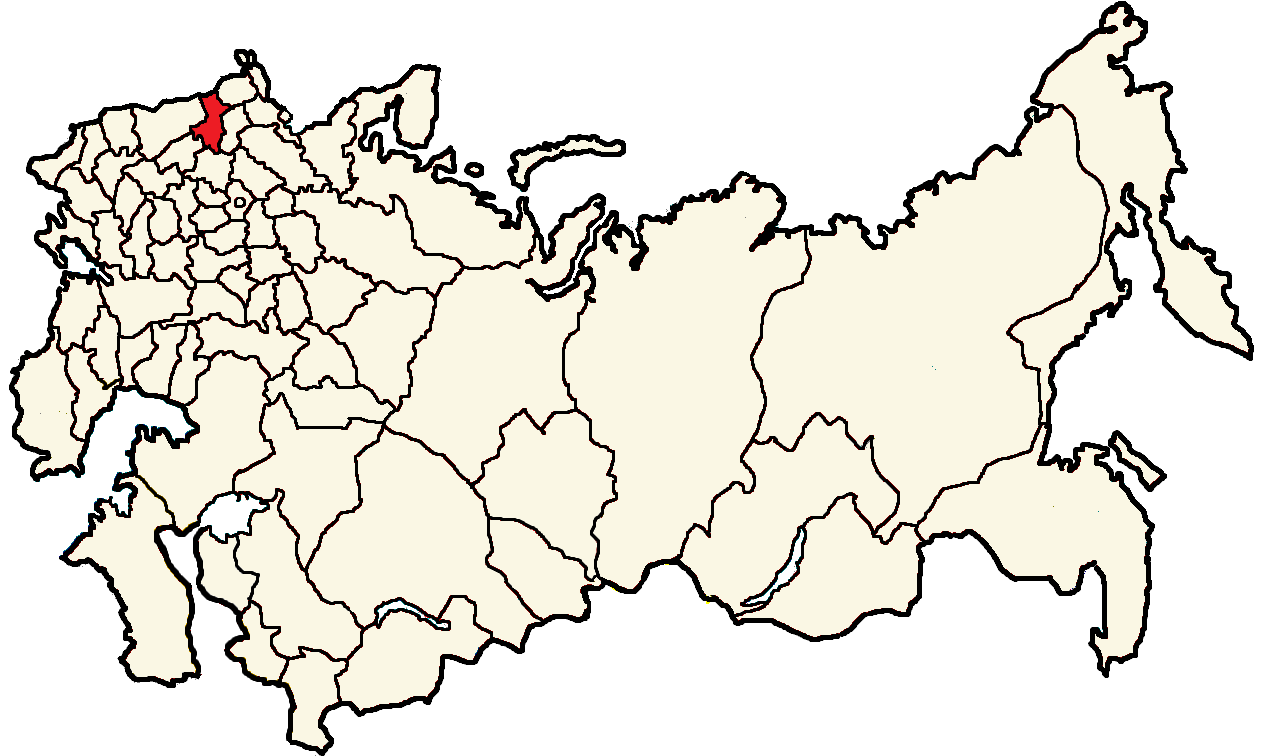
Vitebsk electoral district

- Maksim Boldysh (Socialist Revolutionary Party)
- Andrius Bulota (Socialist Revolutionary Party)
- Aleksandr Gizetti (Socialist Revolutionary Party)
- Felix Dzerzhinsky (Bolsheviks)
- Lev Kamenev (Bolsheviks)
- Boris Pinson (Bolsheviks)
- Zalman Ryvkin (Bolsheviks)
- Sarkis Sarkisyants (Bolsheviks)
- Stefan Czeszejko-Sochacki (Bolsheviks)

== Vladimir ==
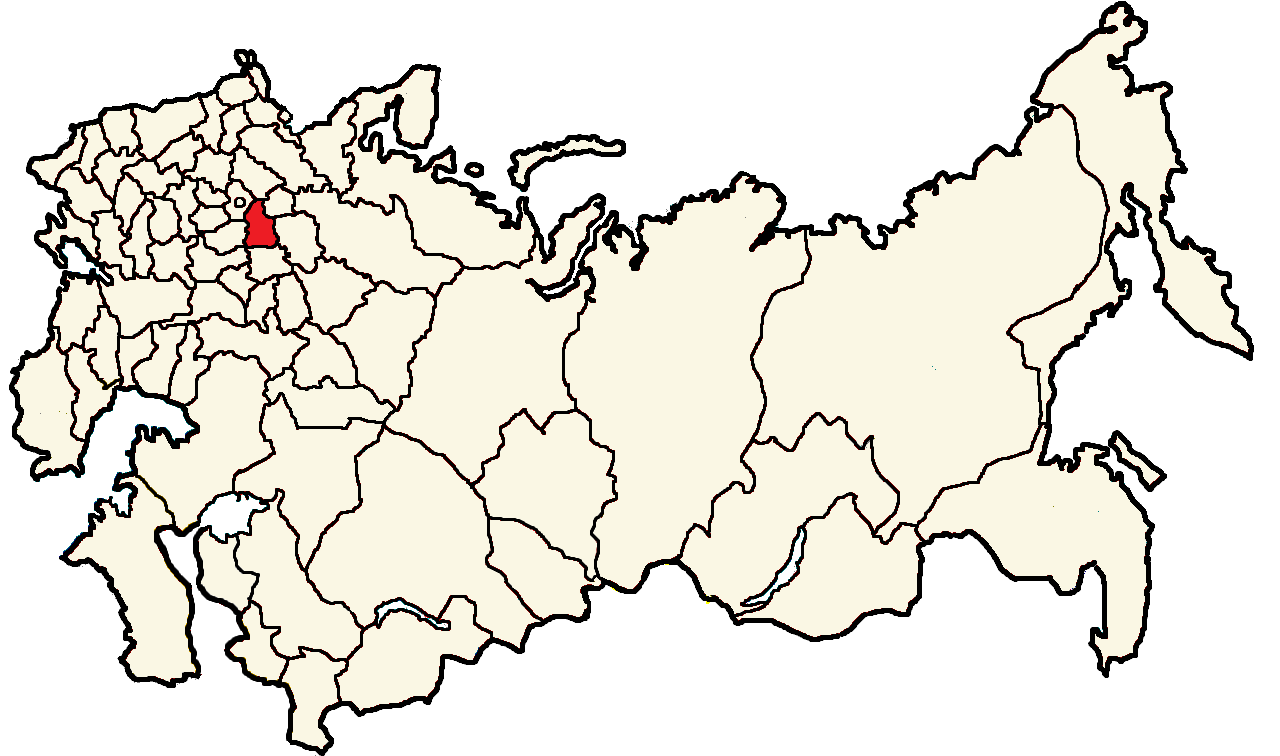
Vladimir electoral district

- Nikolai Zhideleov (Bolsheviks)
- Aleksei Kiselyov (Bolsheviks)
- Georgy Oppokov (Bolsheviks)
- Isidor Lyubimov (Bolsheviks)
- Nikolai Makeyev (Socialist Revolutionary Party)/Congress of peasant deputies
- Valerian Naumov (Bolsheviks)
- Feodor Sokolov (Socialist Revolutionary Party)/Congress of peasant deputies
- Maria Spiridonova (Socialist Revolutionary Party)/Congress of peasant deputies
- Mikhail Frunze (Bolsheviks)

== Vologda ==
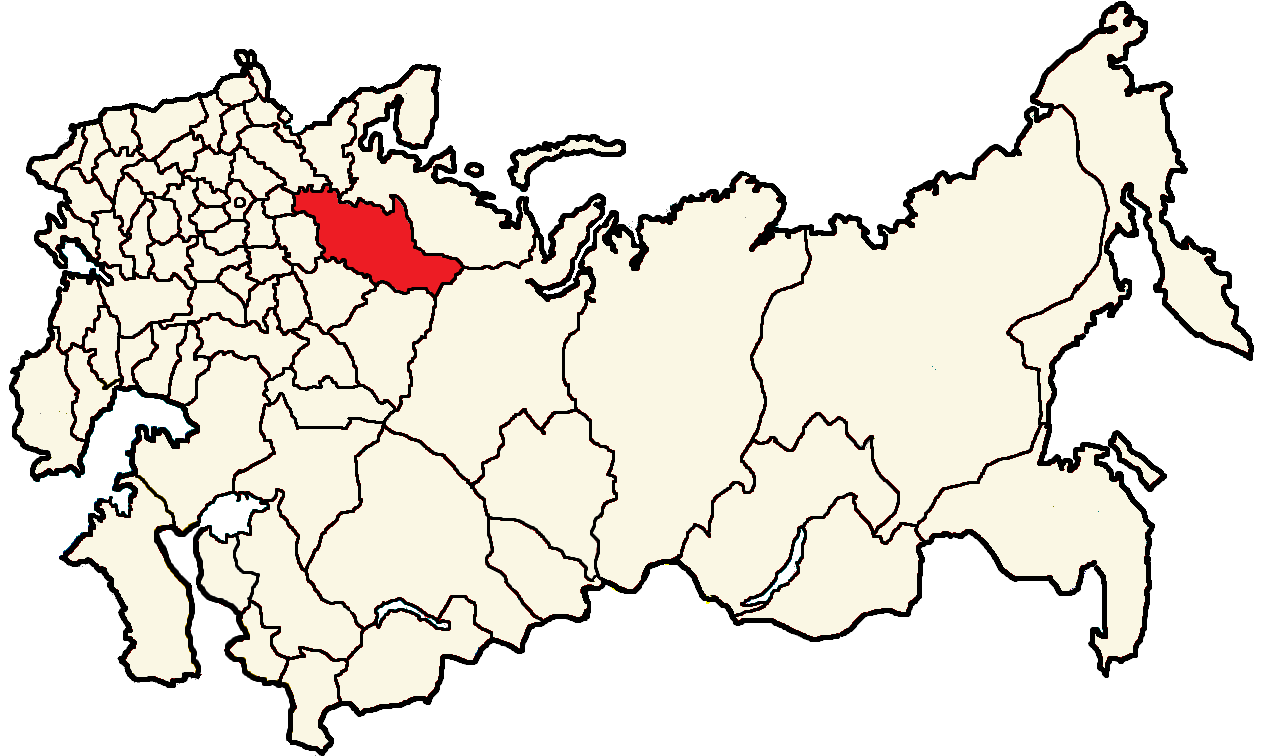
Vologda electoral district

- Mikhail Vetoshkin (Bolsheviks)
- Ivan Galkin (Socialist Revolutionary Party)/Council of peasant deputies
- Aleksandr Koriakin (Socialist Revolutionary Party)/Council of peasant deputies
- Sergei Maslov (Socialist Revolutionary Party)/Council of peasant deputies
- Nikolai Raschesayev (Socialist Revolutionary Party)/Council of peasant deputies
- Pitirim Sorokin (Socialist Revolutionary Party)/Council of peasant deputies
- Peotr Yuretskiy (Socialist Revolutionary Party)/Council of peasant deputies

== Volyn ==
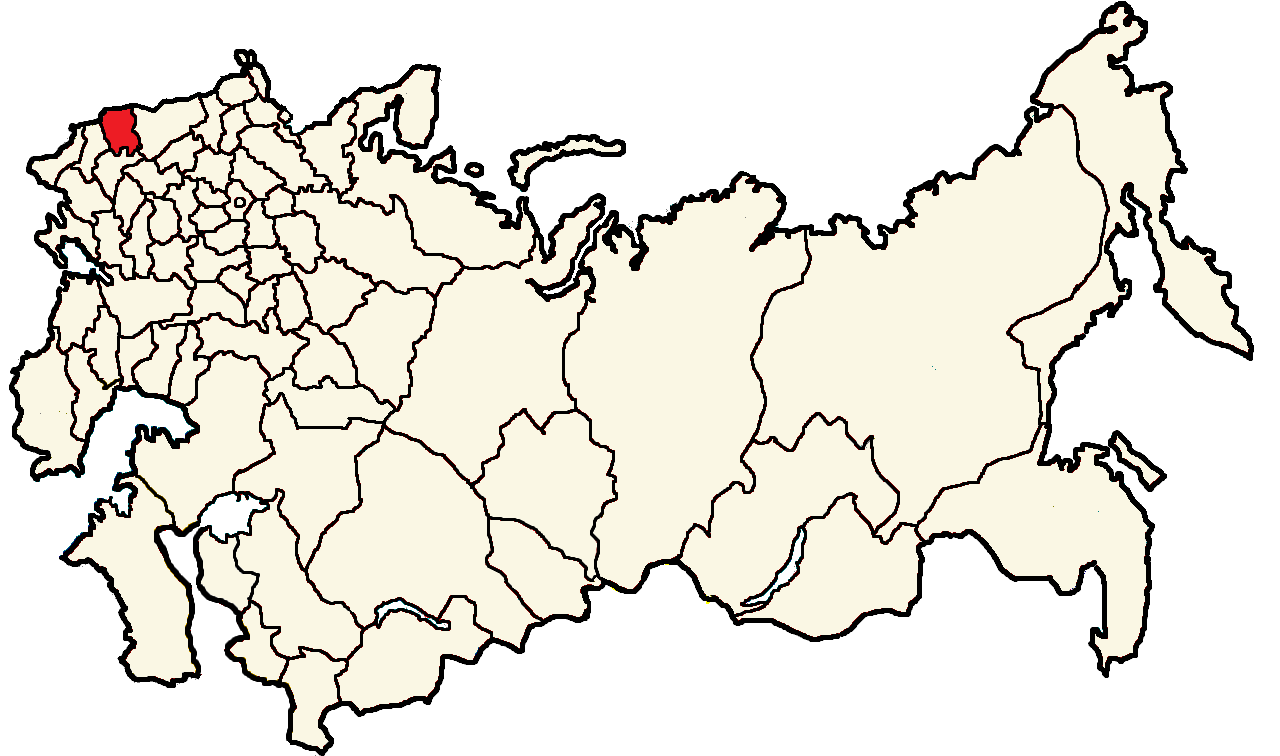
Volya electoral district

- Ivan Hedz (Ukrainian Social Revolutionary)/Council of peasant deputies
- Feodosiy Kobylchuk (Ukrainian Social Revolutionary)/Council of peasant deputies
- Kalenyk Koval (Ukrainian Social Revolutionary)/Council of peasant deputies
- Jan Lipkowski (Polish List)
- Trokhym Martsyniuk (Ukrainian Social Revolutionary)/Council of peasant deputies
- Dmytro Pavliuk (Ukrainian Social Revolutionary)/Council of peasant deputies
- Maksym Trots (Ukrainian Social Revolutionary)/Council of peasant deputies
- Markian Cheranovskyi (Ukrainian Social Revolutionary)/Council of peasant deputies

== Voronezh ==
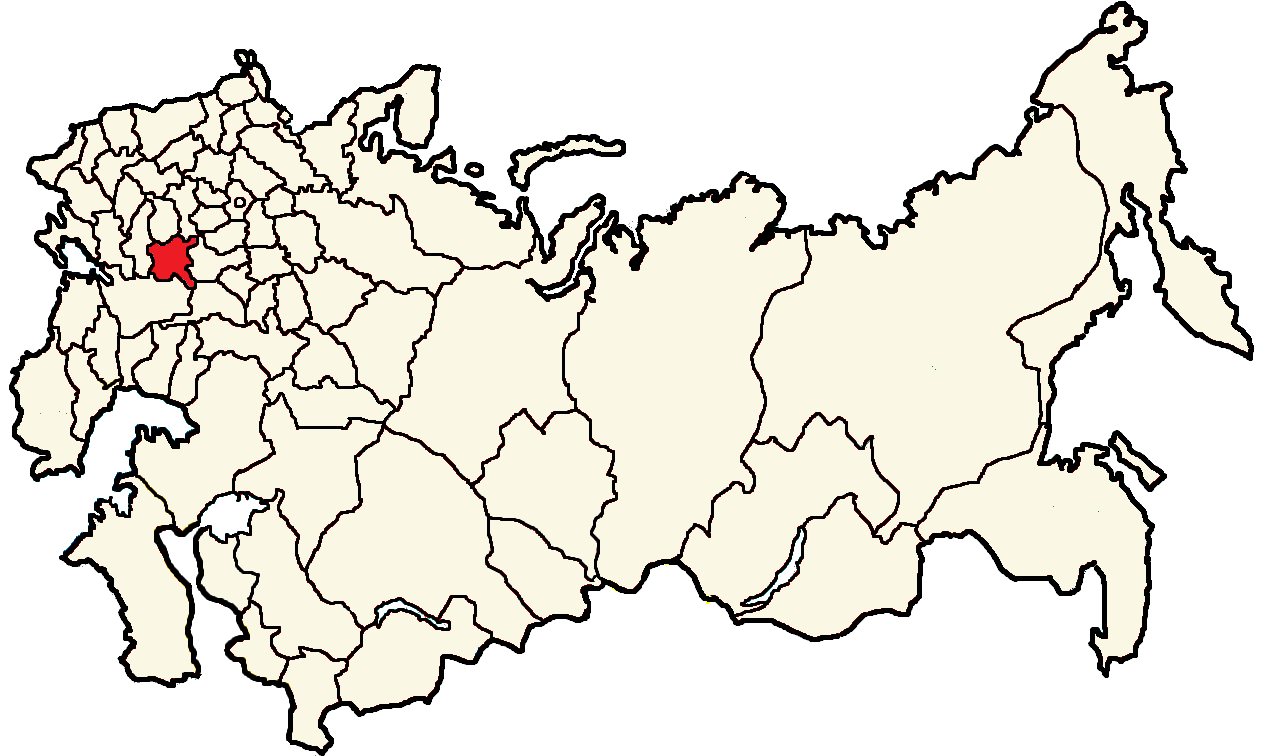
Voronezh electoral district

- Hilarion Antipin (Socialist Revolutionary Party)
- Arteom Blyzniuk (Socialist Revolutionary Party)
- Kost Bureviy (Socialist Revolutionary Party)
- Yakov Gladkikh (Socialist Revolutionary Party)
- German Zinin (Socialist Revolutionary Party)
- Matvei Kogan-Bernstein (Socialist Revolutionary Party)
- Ivan Mamkin (Socialist Revolutionary Party)
- Vladimir Nevsky (Bolsheviks and other internationalists)
- Nikolai Nikitin (Socialist Revolutionary Party)
- Nikolai Oganovskiy (Socialist Revolutionary Party)
- Sergei Postnikov (Socialist Revolutionary Party)
- Ivan Smirnov (Socialist Revolutionary Party)
- Konstantin Khrenovskiy (Socialist Revolutionary Party)
- Nikolai Kardashov (Bolsheviks and other internationalists)
- Maria Perveeva (Socialist Revolutionary Party)
- Aleksandr Ruttsen (National Freedom)

== Yakutsk ==
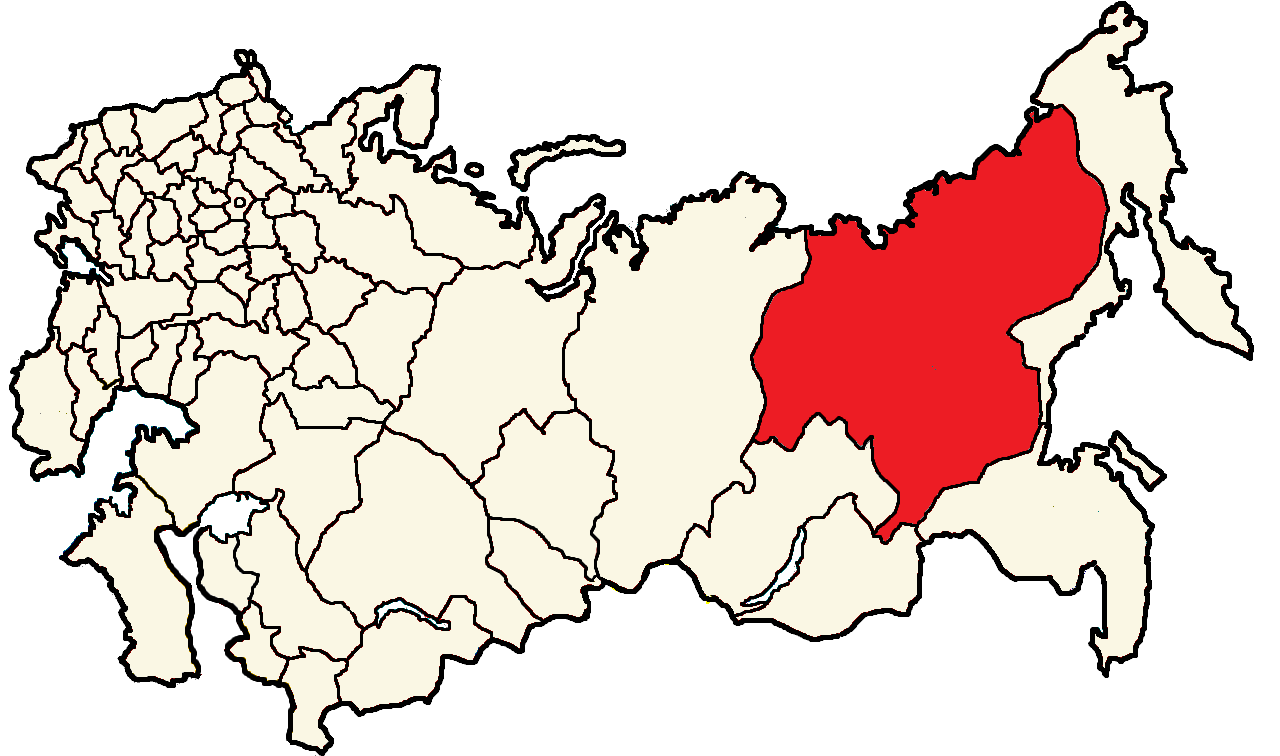
Yakutsk electoral district

- Gavriil Ksenofontov (Federalists Labour Union)
- Vasiliy Pankratov (Socialist Revolutionary Party)

== Yaroslavl ==
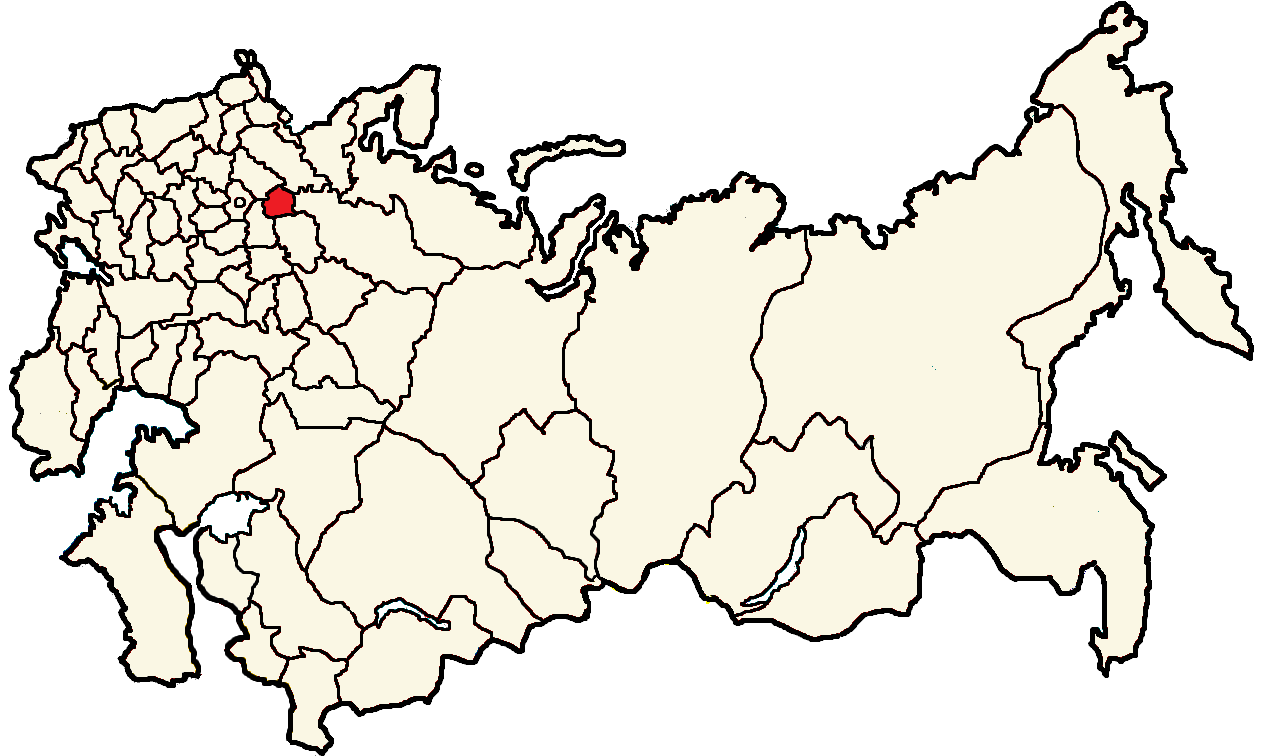
Yaroslavl electoral district

- Feodor Bolshakov (Socialist Revolutionary Party)/Council of peasant deputies
- Mark Vishniak (Socialist Revolutionary Party)/Council of peasant deputies
- Vladimir Kilchevskiy (Socialist Revolutionary Party)/Council of peasant deputies
- Alexandra Kollontai (Bolsheviks-Internationlists)
- Alexei Rykov (Bolsheviks-Internationlists)
- Aleksandr Konovalov (National Freedom)

== Yekaterinoslav ==
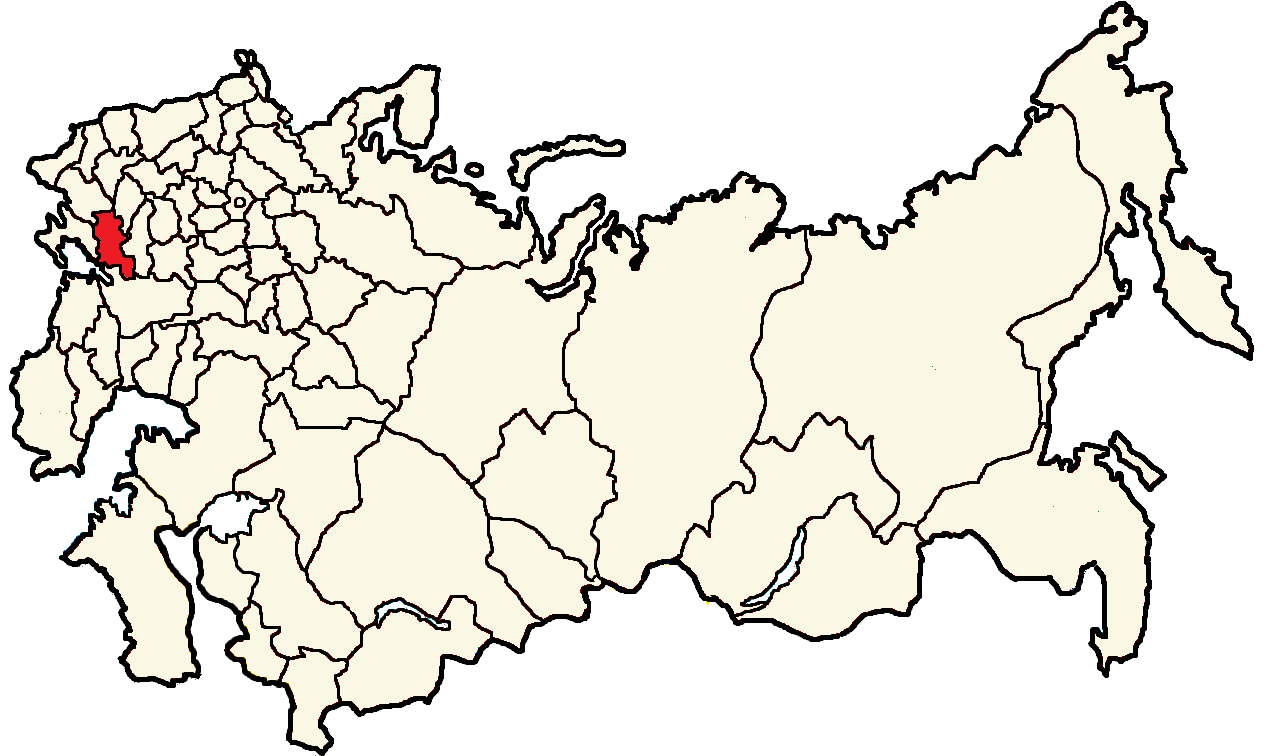
Yekaterinoslav electoral district

- Vasiliy Averin (Bolsheviks)/Bakhmut council of peasant deputies
- Serhiy Bachynskyi (Ukrainian Peasant Union, Spilka)
- Kliment Voroshilov (Bolsheviks)/Bakhmut council of peasant deputies
- Mykola Hvozdykivskyi (Zemlia i Volia)
- Oleh Azowsky (Ukrainian Peasant Union, Spilka)
- Kuzma Korzh (Ukrainian Peasant Union, Spilka)
- Ivan Lutovinov (Bolsheviks)/Council of peasant deputies
- Ivan Mytsiuk (Ukrainian Peasant Union, Spilka)
- Grigory Petrovsky (Bolsheviks)/Bakhmut council of peasant deputies
- Semen Popov (Zemlia i Volia)
- Oleksandr Radomskyi (Ukrainian Peasant Union, Spilka)
- Dmytro Rozenblium (Zemlia i Volia)
- Ivan Romanenko (Ukrainian Peasant Union, Spilka)
- Andriy Rosin (Ukrainian Peasant Union, Spilka)
- Oleksandr Socheva (Zemlia i Volia)
- Fedir Storubel (Ukrainian Peasant Union, Spilka)
- Vasyl Stromenko (Ukrainian Peasant Union, Spilka)
- Pavlo Surhai (Ukrainian Peasant Union, Spilka)

== Yeniseysk ==
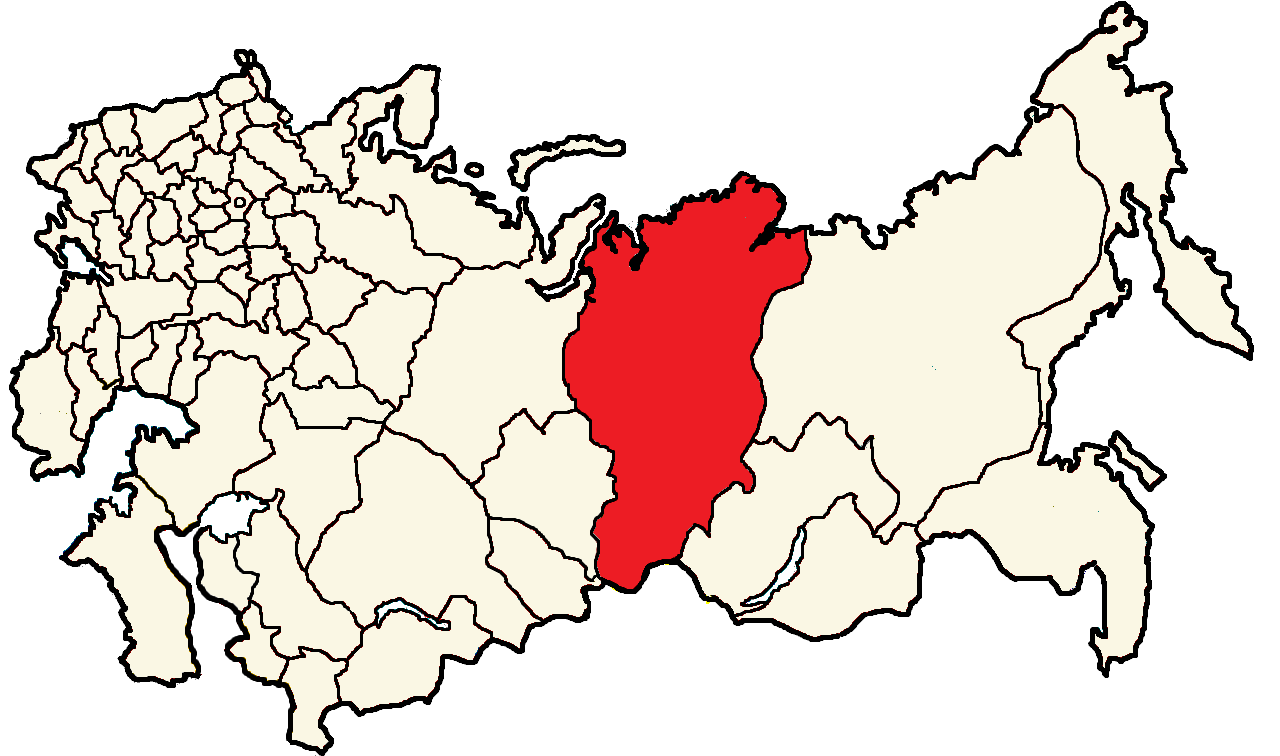
Yeniseysk electoral district

- Kuzma Gurov (Socialist Revolutionary Party)
- Yevgeniy Kolosov (Socialist Revolutionary Party)
- Aleksei Okulov (Bolsheviks)
- Aleksei Rogov (Bolsheviks)
- Nil Fomin (Socialist Revolutionary Party)
- Roberts Eidemanis (Socialist Revolutionary Party)

== Unknown ==
- Kozma Burov
- Denis Inyrev

== Mandates for military candidates ==
=== Romanian Front ===
- Vasiliy Abramov (Socialist Revolutionary Party)/Council of peasant deputies
- Vladimir Alekseyevskiy (Socialist Revolutionary Party)/Council of peasant deputies
- Vladimir Andrianov (Socialist Revolutionary Party)/Council of peasant deputies
- Nikolai Bocharnikov (Socialist Revolutionary Party)/Council of peasant deputies
- Arseniy Bylinkin (Socialist Revolutionary Party)/Council of peasant deputies
- Vasiliy Yerofeyev (Socialist Revolutionary Party)/Council of peasant deputies
- Peotr Kotlin (Socialist Revolutionary Party)/Council of peasant deputies
- Arkadiy Krakovetskiy (Socialist Revolutionary Party)/Council of peasant deputies
- Nikolai Krylenko (Bolsheviks)
- Ivan Lordkipanidze (Socialist Revolutionary Party)/Council of peasant deputies
- Sergei Markov (Socialist Revolutionary Party)/Council of peasant deputies
- Pavel Mostovenko (Bolsheviks)
- Symon Petliura (Ukrainian Socialist Organization)
- Viktor Pysnachevskyi (Ukrainian Socialist Organization)
- David Riazanov (Bolsheviks)
- Boris Solers (Bolsheviks)
- Arystarkh Ternychenko (Ukrainian Socialist Organization)
- Nikolai Shmeleov (Socialist Revolutionary Party)/Council of peasant deputies
- Yukhym Hryshchenko (Ukrainian Socialists united)
- Ilya Ilyinskiy (Socialist Revolutionary Party)/Council of peasant deputies

=== Northern Front ===
- Vladimir Antonov-Ovseenko (Bolsheviks)
- Aleksandr Vasilyev (Bolsheviks)
- Nikolai Ivanov (Socialist Revolutionary Party)/Council of peasant deputies
- Ivan Klochko (Ukrainian Socialist Revolutionary Party, national socialist organizations of Muslims)
- Viacheslav Kolerov (Socialist Revolutionary Party)/Council of peasant deputies
- Mikhail Likhach (Socialist Revolutionary Party)/Council of peasant deputies
- Sergei Medvedev (Bolsheviks)
- Semyon Nakhimson (Bolsheviks)
- Nikolai Podvoisky (Bolsheviks)
- Boris Rabinovich (Socialist Revolutionary Party)/Council of peasant deputies
- Alexander Sedyakin (Bolsheviks)
- Ephraim Sklyansky (Bolsheviks)
- Ivar Smilga (Bolsheviks)
- Pēteris Stučka (Bolsheviks)
- Vladimir Utgof (Socialist Revolutionary Party)/Council of peasant deputies
- Aron Sheinman (Bolsheviks)

=== Western Front ===
- Sergei Anuchin (Bolsheviks)
- Ivan Apeter (Bolsheviks)
- Isaak Baziak (Ukrainian Socialist Revolutionary Party, Social-Democrats)
- Mikhail Vasilyev (Bolsheviks)
- Franciszek Grzelszczak (Bolsheviks)
- Itsko Zetel-Zusman (Socialist Revolutionary Party)/Council of peasant deputies
- Ivan Ksenofontov (Bolsheviks)
- Vasiliy Kukonkov (Bolsheviks)
- Mykhailo Lebedynets (Ukrainian Socialist Revolutionary Party, Social-Democrats)
- Yefim Lysiakov (Bolsheviks)
- Viktor Morgenshtiern (Socialist Revolutionary Party)/Council of peasant deputies
- Alexander Miasnikian (Bolsheviks)
- Mikhail Nikolayev (Socialist Revolutionary Party)/Council of peasant deputies
- Nikolai Rogozinskiy (Bolsheviks)
- Nikolai Tikhmenev (Bolsheviks)
- Innokentiy Fedenev (Bolsheviks)
- Aleksandr Yakovlev (Bolsheviks)

=== Caucasus Front ===
- Alexei Badayev (Bolsheviks)
- Nikolay Berezov (Socialist Revolutionary Party)
- Dmitriy Donskoy (Socialist Revolutionary Party)
- Aleksandr Pyzhev (Socialist Revolutionary Party)
- Leon Tumanov (Socialist Revolutionary Party)
- Stepan Mikhailov (Socialist Revolutionary Party)

=== South-Western Front ===
- Savatiy Berezniak (Ukrainian Socialist Revolutionary Party)
- Feodor Danskiy (Socialist Revolutionary Party)/Council of peasant deputies
- Anton Detlaf (Socialist Revolutionary Party)/Council of peasant deputies
- Grigoriy Dikanskiy (Socialist Revolutionary Party)/Council of peasant deputies
- Mikhail Kokovikhin (Bolsheviks)
- Petro Kutsiak (Ukrainian Socialist Revolutionary Party)
- Mikhail Lashevich (Bolsheviks)
- Eduard Levenberg (Socialist Revolutionary Party)/Council of peasant deputies
- Nikolai Lischev (Socialist Revolutionary Party)/Council of peasant deputies
- Nikolai Marchenkov (Bolsheviks)
- Boris Moiseyenko (Socialist Revolutionary Party)/Council of peasant deputies
- Vladimir Nikotin (Socialist Revolutionary Party)/Council of peasant deputies
- Leonid Pyatakov (Bolsheviks)
- Elena Rozmirovich (Bolsheviks)
- Boris Sokoloff (Socialist Revolutionary Party)/Council of peasant deputies
- Dmitriy Surgucheov (Socialist Revolutionary Party)/Council of peasant deputies
- Alexander Troyanovsky (Mensheviks united)
- Peotr Trubacheov (Bolsheviks)
- Vasiliy Filippovskiy (Socialist Revolutionary Party)/Council of peasant deputies
- Grigoriy Chudnovskiy (Bolsheviks)
- Oleksandr Dolhov (Ukrainian Socialist Revolutionary Party)

=== Black Sea Fleet ===
- Ilya Fondaminsky (Socialist Revolutionary Party)

=== Baltic Sea Fleet ===
- Pavel Dybenko (Bolsheviks)
- Vladimir Lenin (Bolsheviks)
