= Horde electoral district =

Constituency of the Russian Republic

Horde
- Former Civilian constituency for the All-Russian Constituent Assembly
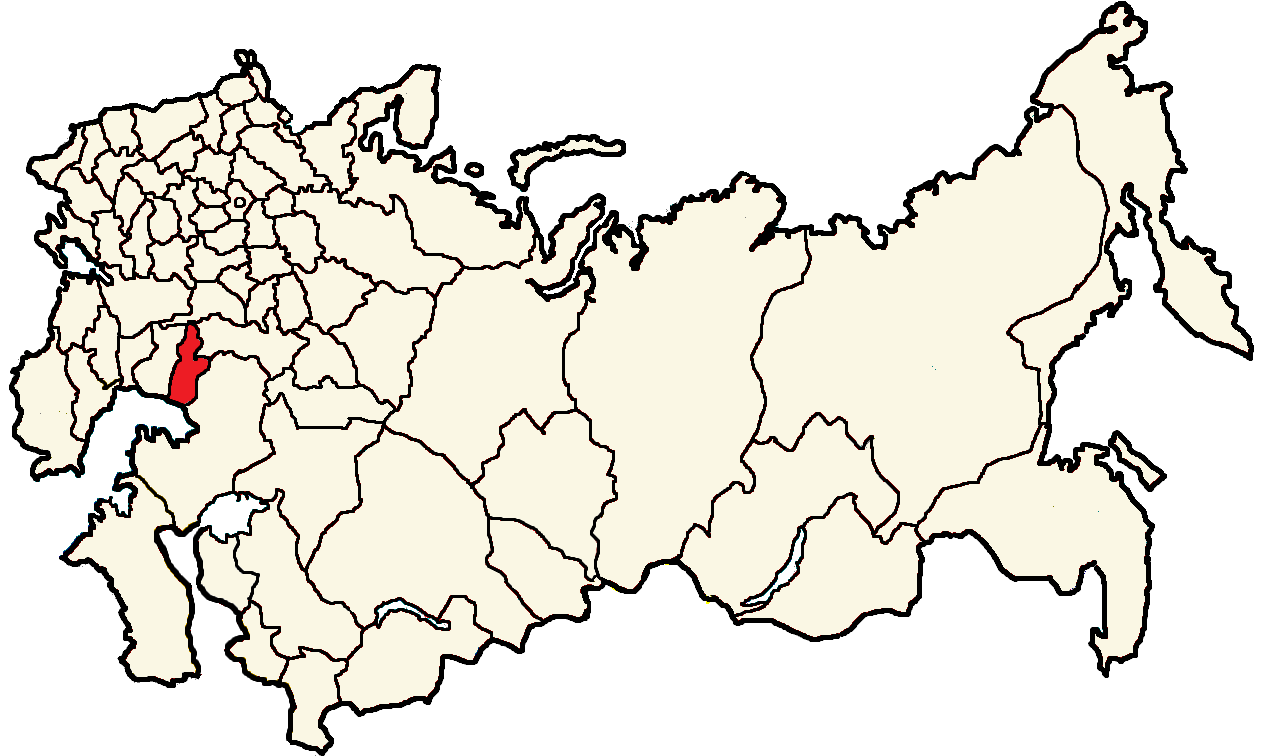

Former constituency
- Created: 1917
- Abolished: 1918
- Number of members: 2

The Horde electoral district (Russian: Ордынский избирательный округ) was a constituency created for the 1917 Russian Constituent Assembly election. The Horde (or 'Orda') electoral district covered the areas of the Bukey Horde in the Transvolga, which were areas of the Astrakhan Governorate. Khanskaya Stavka was the administrative center of the electoral district. Two seats in the Constituent Assembly were assigned to the constituency.

According to U.S. historian Oliver Henry Radkey, 2 lists had registered in the Horde electoral district. Alash Orda did not field a list of their own in the Horde district, but joined forces with other Muslim groups.

As per Radkey's (1989) account, no information on whether election was held. As per Wade (2004), members of the local revolutionary committee began arresting the District Election Commission officials as the vote tallying was ongoing.
