= Simbirsk electoral district =

Simbirsk
- Former Civilian constituency for the All-Russian Constituent Assembly
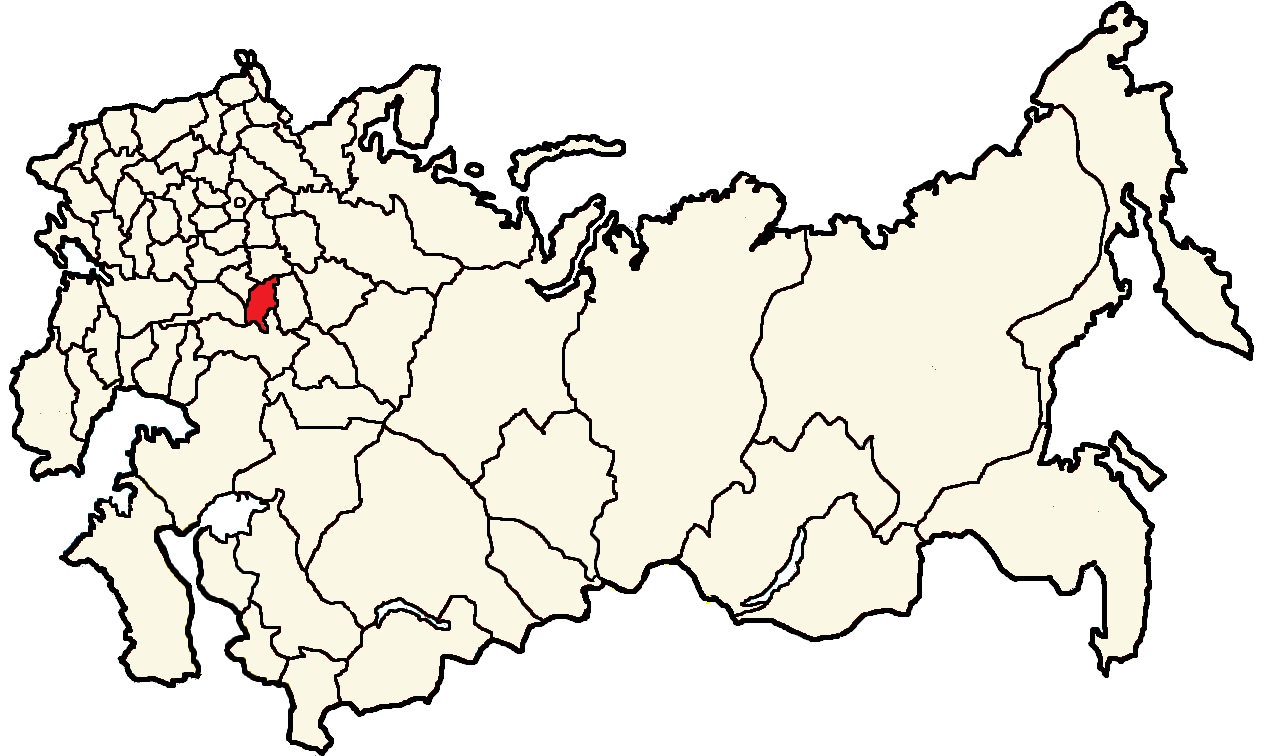

Former constituency
- Created: 1917
- Abolished: 1918
- Number of members: 9
- Number of Uyezd Electoral Commissions: 8
- Number of Urban Electoral Commissions: 2
- Number of Parishes: 153

The Simbirsk electoral district (Russian: Симбирский избирательный округ) was a constituency created for the 1917 Russian Constituent Assembly election. The electoral district covered the Simbirsk Governorate. Electoral participation was reported at around 58%.

== Results ==
Simbirsk
Party	Vote	%
List 2 - Socialist-Revolutionaries and Congress of Peasants	363,847	57.68
List 10 - Bolsheviks	93,000	14.74
List 8 - Muslim Shuro Islamia	57,000	9.04
List 4 -SR Defencists	29,446	4.67
List 5 - Kadets	16,718	2.65
List 6 - Mensheviks	3,681	0.58
List 12 - All Chuvash National Congress and Chuvash Organizations	55	0.01
List 9 - Popular Socialists	?	
List 3 - Cooperative	?	
List 13 - Union of Farmers and Landowners	?	
List 11 - Orthodox Parishes	?	
List 7 - Union of Traders, Industrialists, Artisans and Homeowners	?	
List 1 - Workers Committee of Protopov Factory	?	
Unaccounted	67,043	10.63
Total:	630,790	

Deputies Elected
Sverdlov	Bolshevik
Almazov	SR
Gavronsky	SR
Moshkin	SR
Petrov	SR
Pochekuev	SR
Titov	SR
Vorobiev	SR
Tsalikov	Muslim Shuro
