= Amu Darya electoral district =

Constituency of the Russian Republic

Amu Darya
- Former Civilian constituency for the All-Russian Constituent Assembly
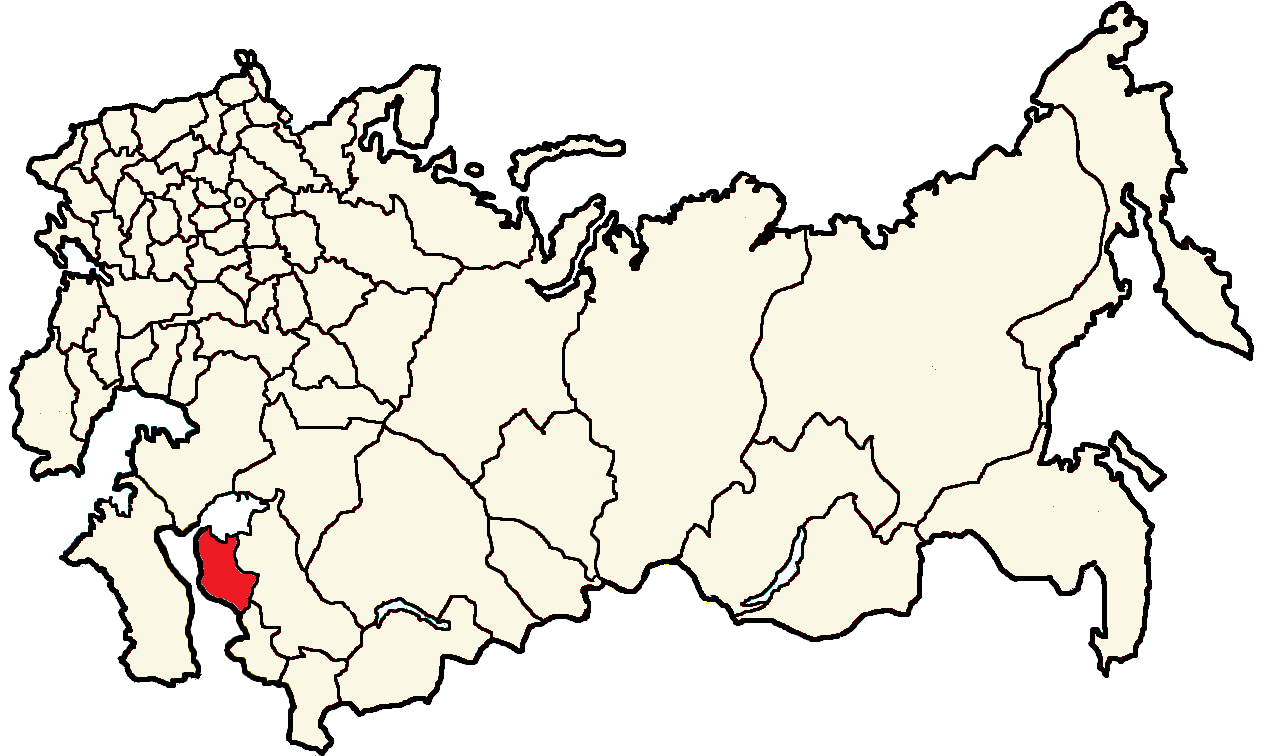

Former constituency
- Created: 1917
- Abolished: 1918
- Number of members: 1
- Number of Parishes: 19

Amu Darya electoral district (Russian: Аму-Дарьинский избирательный округ) was a constituency created for the 1917 Russian Constituent Assembly election. One seat was allotted to the district. The electoral district covered the Amu Darya Division of the Syr-Darya Oblast. According to U.S. historian Oliver Henry Radkey, it is not known whether voting took place. Per Wade (2004), it is certain that no election took place in Amu Darya.

In the autumn of 1917, a meeting of the Muslim National Committee and the Musavat Party had decided to field Nasib Yusifbeyli as their candidate in Amu Darya.
