= Kamchatka electoral district =

Constituency of the Russian Republic

Kamchatka
- Former Civilian constituency for the All-Russian Constituent Assembly
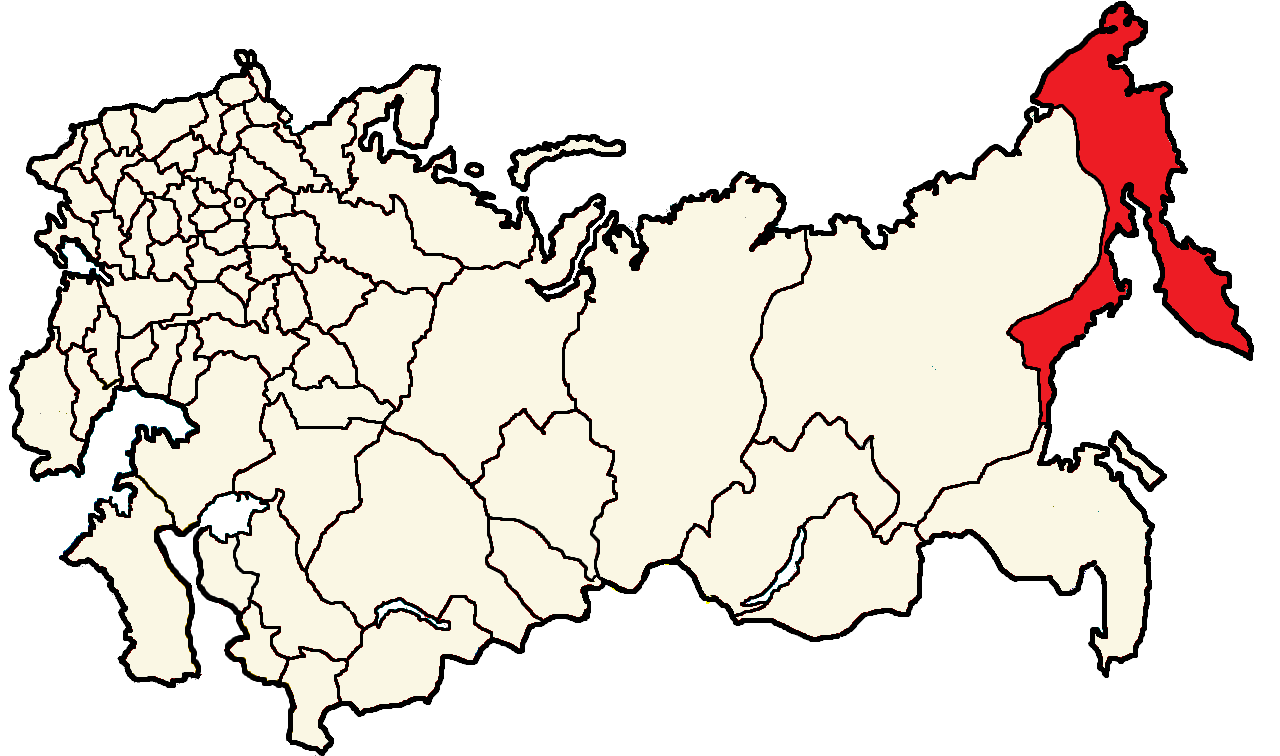

Former constituency
- Created: 1917
- Abolished: 1918
- Number of members: 1
- Number of Uyezd Electoral Commissions: 6
- Number of Urban Electoral Commissions: 1
- Number of Parishes: 105

The Kamchatka electoral district (Russian: Камчатский избирательный округ) was a constituency created for the 1917 Russian Constituent Assembly election. The electoral district covered the Kamchatka Oblast. The constituency was assigned a single seat in the Constituent Assembly.

The vote was held in the Kamchatka electoral district on October 29, 1917, well ahead of the rest of the country, in order to allow its sole deputy to be able to catch the last steamship to Petrograd to attend the opening of the Constituent Assembly.

At the time of the vote the soviets in Kamchatka were under Socialist-Revolutionary and Menshevik influence. By October 1917 Kamchatka lacked an independent Bolshevik party organization (party politics in Petropavlovsk took shape by mid-November 1917).

U.S. historian Oliver Henry Radkey claims to only have been able to trace results from the town of Zavoyko, but the Zavoyko poll was disqualified as the vote had been held one day in advance. 275 people had voted in Zavoyko, 258 of them for SR, 9 for Social Democrats and 8 for others.

== Results ==
Deputies Elected
Lavrov	SR
