= Samarkand electoral district =

Constituency of the Russian Republic

Samarkand
- Former Civilian constituency for the All-Russian Constituent Assembly
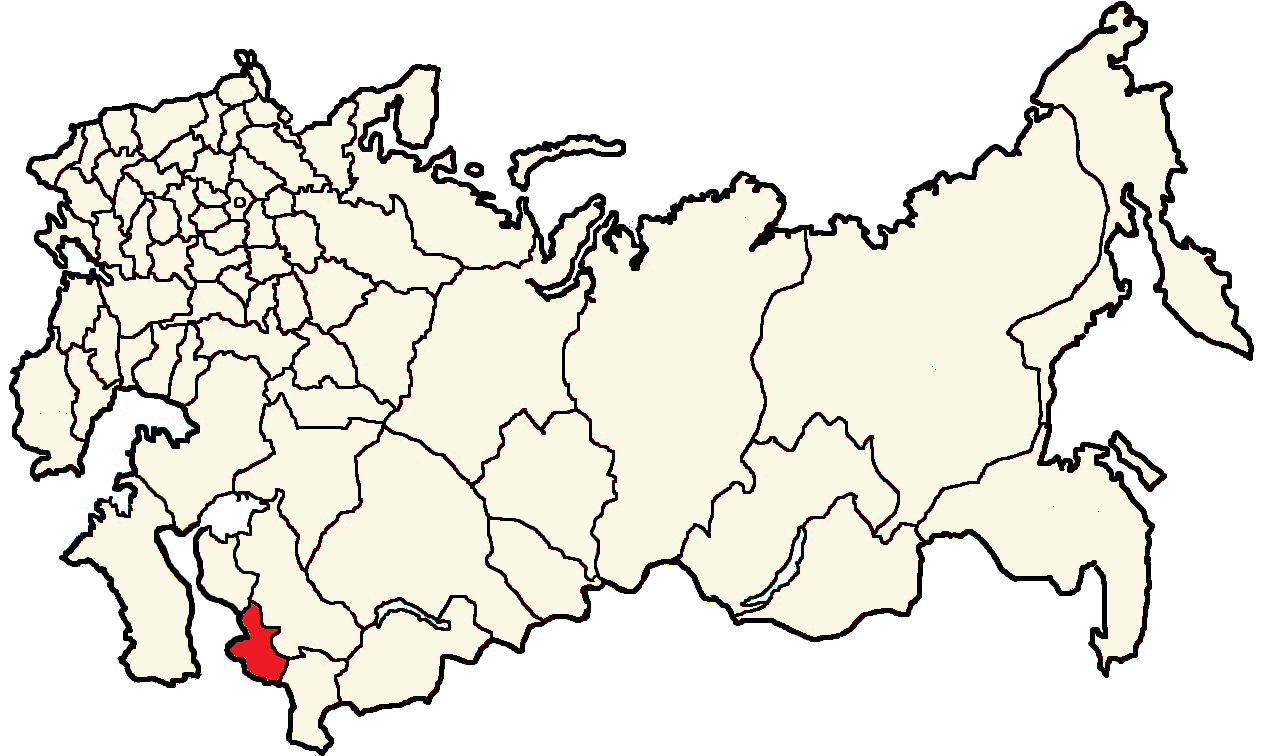

Former constituency
- Created: 1917
- Abolished: 1918
- Number of members: 5
- Number of Uyezd Electoral Commissions: 4
- Number of Urban Electoral Commissions: 1
- Number of Parishes: 77

The Samarkand electoral district (Russian: Самаркандский избирательный округ) was a constituency created for the 1917 Russian Constituent Assembly election. The electoral district covered the Samarkand Oblast. Four candidate lists contested the election in Samarkand; List 1 - Socialist-Revolutionaries, List 2 - Muslim Organizations of Samarkand Oblast, List 3 - Mensheviks and List 4 - United Oblast Progressive Bloc. List 1 and List 3 had an electoral alliance.

== Results ==
Samarkand
Party	Vote	%
List 2 - Muslim Organizations of Samarkand Oblast	87,059	91.84
List 1 - Socialist-Revolutionaries	4,238	4.47
List 4 - United Oblast Progressive Bloc	1,913	2.02
List 3 - Mensheviks	1,586	1.67
Total:	94,796	

Deputies Elected
Abdukhalilov	Muslim organizations of the Samarkand region
Behbudiy	Muslim organizations of the Samarkand region
Farhatov	Muslim organizations of the Samarkand region
Maksudi	Muslim organizations of the Samarkand region
