= Transcaspian electoral district =

Constituency of the Russian Republic

Transcaspian
- Former Civilian constituency for the All-Russian Constituent Assembly
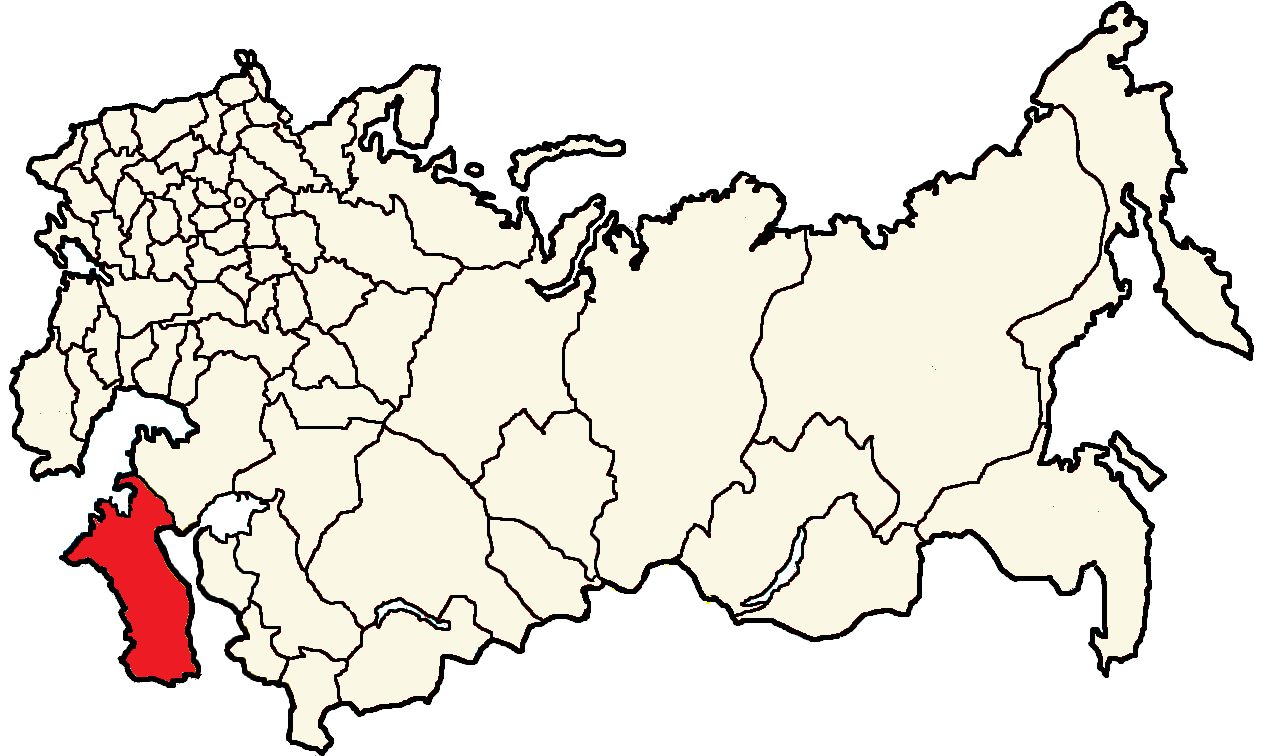

Former constituency
- Created: 1917
- Abolished: 1918
- Number of members: 2
- Number of Uyezd Electoral Commissions: 4
- Number of Urban Electoral Commissions: 1
- Number of Parishes: 238

The Transcaspian electoral district (Russian: Закаспийский избирательный округ) was a constituency created for the 1917 Russian Constituent Assembly election. The electoral district covered the Transcaspian Oblast, except for most of the Mangyshlak uezd (only the volosts inhabited by Turkmens remained part of the Transcaspian electoral district). The Transcaspian electoral district was assigned 2 seats in the Constituent Assembly. According to U.S. historian Oliver Henry Radkey (1989), an election was held but results not known. Per Wade (2004), it is certain that no election took place in the Transcaspian electoral district.
