= Stavropol electoral district =

Landmark

Stavropol
- Former Civilian constituency for the All-Russian Constituent Assembly
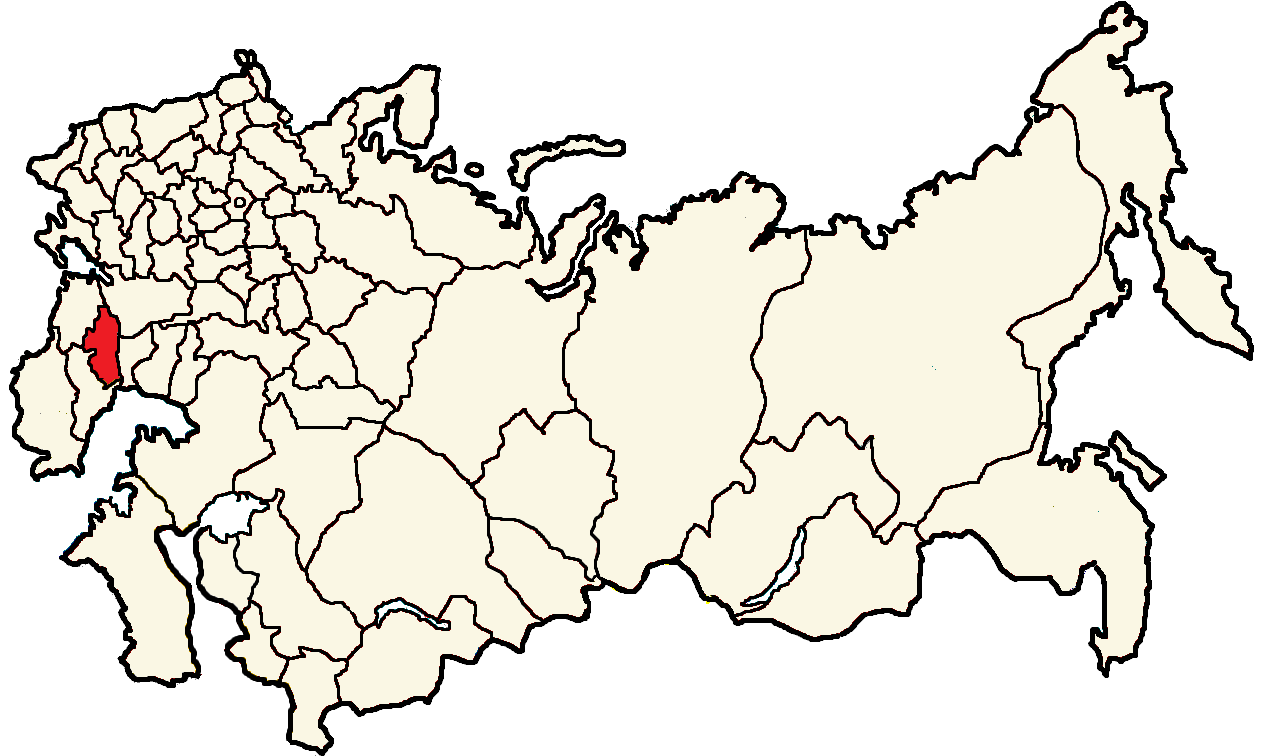

Former constituency
- Created: 1917
- Abolished: 1918
- Number of members: 6
- Number of Uyezd Electoral Commissions: 8
- Number of Urban Electoral Commissions: 1
- Number of Parishes: 158

The Stavropol electoral district (Russian: Ставропольский избирательный округ) was a constituency created for the 1917 Russian Constituent Assembly election. The electoral district covered the Stavropol Governorate, as well as the Karanogai precinct (which was part of the Terek Oblast).

The Stavropol District Electoral Commission for the Constituent Assembly was set-up August 12, 1917, with V. M. Krasnov, prosecutor of the Stavropol District Court, as its head. 319 voting centres, each covering about 2,000 voters, were set up across the electoral district. 46 candidates on 7 lists contested the election.

The SR and Peasant Soviet list was headed by F. M. Onipko, who was popular in the district. Joseph Stalin stood as a candidate on the Bolshevik list.

Voting lasted for three days, November 12–14. The two first days, the polling stations were opened between 9 a.m. and 9 p.m., whilst on November 14 the polling stations closed at 2 p.m. 88% of the eligible voters cast their ballots. In Stavropol town the Bolsheviks won 47.6% of the vote. Likewise, in Pyatigorsk the Bolsheviks won some 8,000 votes, half of the votes from the town.

== Results ==
Stavropol
Party	Vote	%	Seats
List 1 - Socialist-Revolutionaries and Soviet of Peasants Deputies	291,395	88.69	6
List 2 - Bolsheviks	17,430	5.31	
List 5 - Kadets	10,938	3.33	
List 3 - Farmers	3,205	0.98	
List 4 - [Orthodox] Clergy and Worshippers	3,078	0.94	
List 7 - Mensheviks	1,836	0.56	
List 6 - Popular Socialists- and Cooperativists	670	0.20	
Total:	328,552		6

Deputies Elected
Bocharnikov	SR
Dementiev	SR
Emelyanov	SR
Garnitsky	SR
Gutorov	SR
Onipko	SR
