= Pricaspian electoral district =

Constituency of the Russian Republic

Pricaspian
- Former Civilian constituency for the All-Russian Constituent Assembly
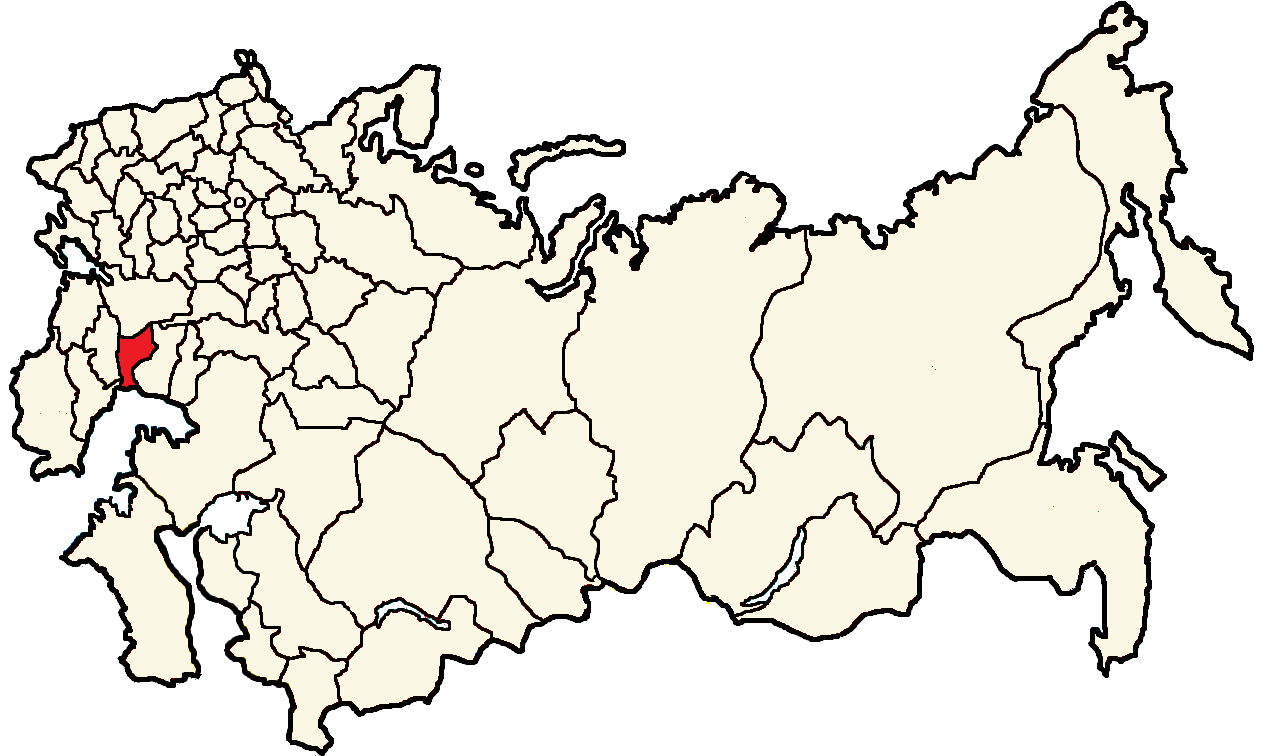

Former constituency
- Created: 1917
- Abolished: 1918
- Number of members: 1

The Pricaspian electoral district (Russian: Прикаспийский избирательный округ) was a constituency created for the 1917 Russian Constituent Assembly election.

The Pricaspian electoral district, which included areas of the Kalmyk steppe of the Astrakhan Governorate, was thinly populated. One seat in the All-Russian Constituent Assembly was assigned to the constituency.

The Pricaspian Oblast Election Commission was set up on September 16, 1917 by the Central Committee for the Kalmyk People's Administration (CCKPA). The Chairman was B.E. Krishtafovich, CCKPA Chairman, accompanied by members I.O. Ochirov (assistant CCKPA chair), S.B. Bayanov, E.A. Sarangov, E.S. Bakayev and with F.I. Plyunov as its secretary. On September 23, 1917 the Pricaspian Oblast Election Commission set up 52 electoral precincts: 10 in Maloderbetovsky ulus 10 precincts, 10 in Manychsky ulus, 7 in Yandyko-Mochaznyi ulus, 12 in Ikitsokhuro-Kharakhusovsky 12, 9 precincts in the uluses of Bagaotsokhuro-Khoshoutovsky and Erketenevsky and 4 precincts in the Kuma aimak of the Terek oblast (which initially had not been planned to be part of the Pricaspian Electoral District).

A list was submitted, signed by 137 electors, with the 33-year old lawyer Sandzhi Bayanovich Bayanov as its candidate. Due to late arrival of electoral material, the vote was postponed to November 26–28, 1917. The vote was reportedly held on these dates, in some places with very low turnout. Bayanov received a majority of votes.
