= Syr Darya electoral district =

Constituency of the Russian Republic

Syr Darya
- Former Civilian constituency for the All-Russian Constituent Assembly
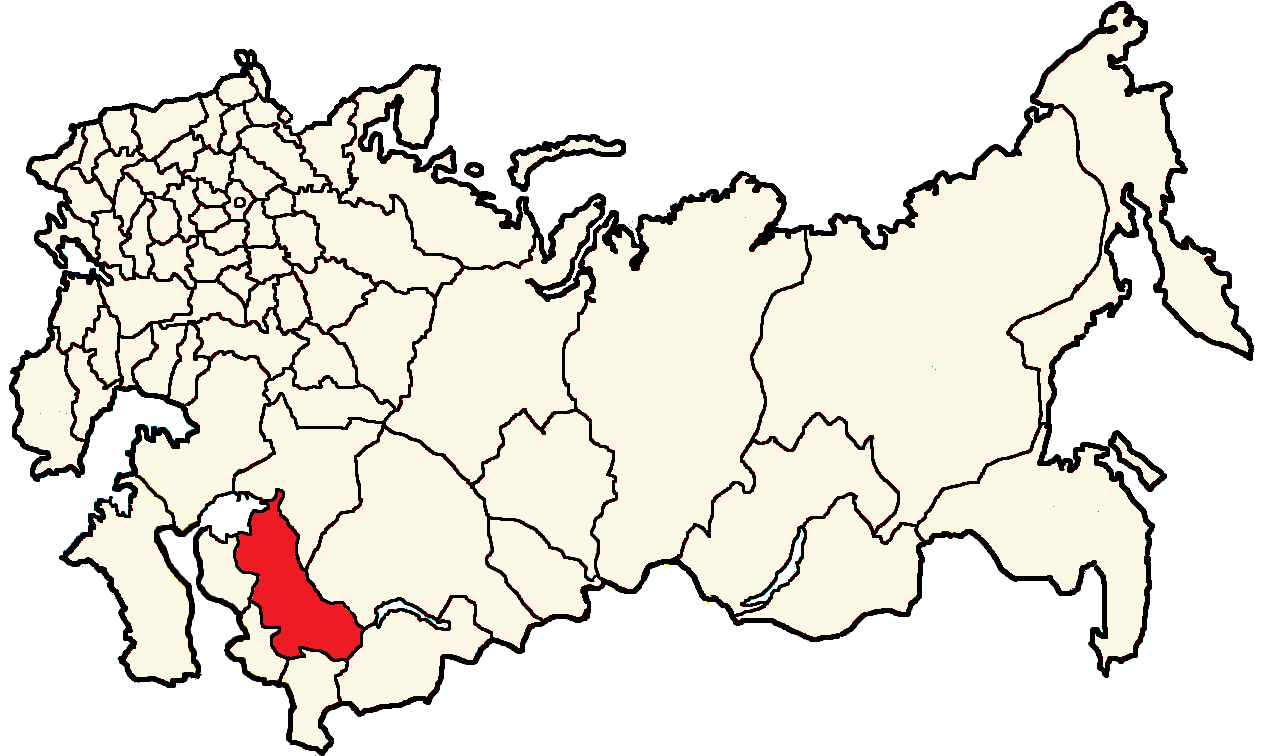

Former constituency
- Created: 1917
- Abolished: 1918
- Number of members: 9
- Number of Uyezd Electoral Commissions: 5
- Number of Urban Electoral Commissions: 1
- Number of Parishes: 154

The Syr Darya electoral district (Russian: Сыр-Дарьинский избирательный округ) was a constituency created for the 1917 Russian Constituent Assembly election. The electoral district covered the Syr-Darya Oblast, except for the Amu Darya Division.

Seven candidate lists registered to contest the election in Syr Darya: List 1 - Second Congress of Peasant Deputies, List 2 - Muslim Congress of the Syr-Darya Province, List 3 - All-Muslim List, List 4 - Mensheviks, List 5 - Kadets, List 6 - Progressives and List 7 - Socialist-Revolutionaries. List 1 and List 7 had an electoral alliance. In the autumn of 1917, a meeting of the Muslim National Committee and the Musavat Party had decided to field Alimardan Topchubashov as their candidate in Amu Darya. Alash Orda did not field a separate list in Syr-Darya, but joined with other Muslim forces for the election.

Voting in Syr-Darya was initially postponed until mid-December 1917, and later rescheduled for January 19, 1918. In the end, no vote ever took place. 9 seats had been allotted to Syr Darya.
