= Kuban-Black Sea electoral district =

Constituency of the Russian Republic

Kuban-Black Sea
- Former Civilian constituency for the All-Russian Constituent Assembly
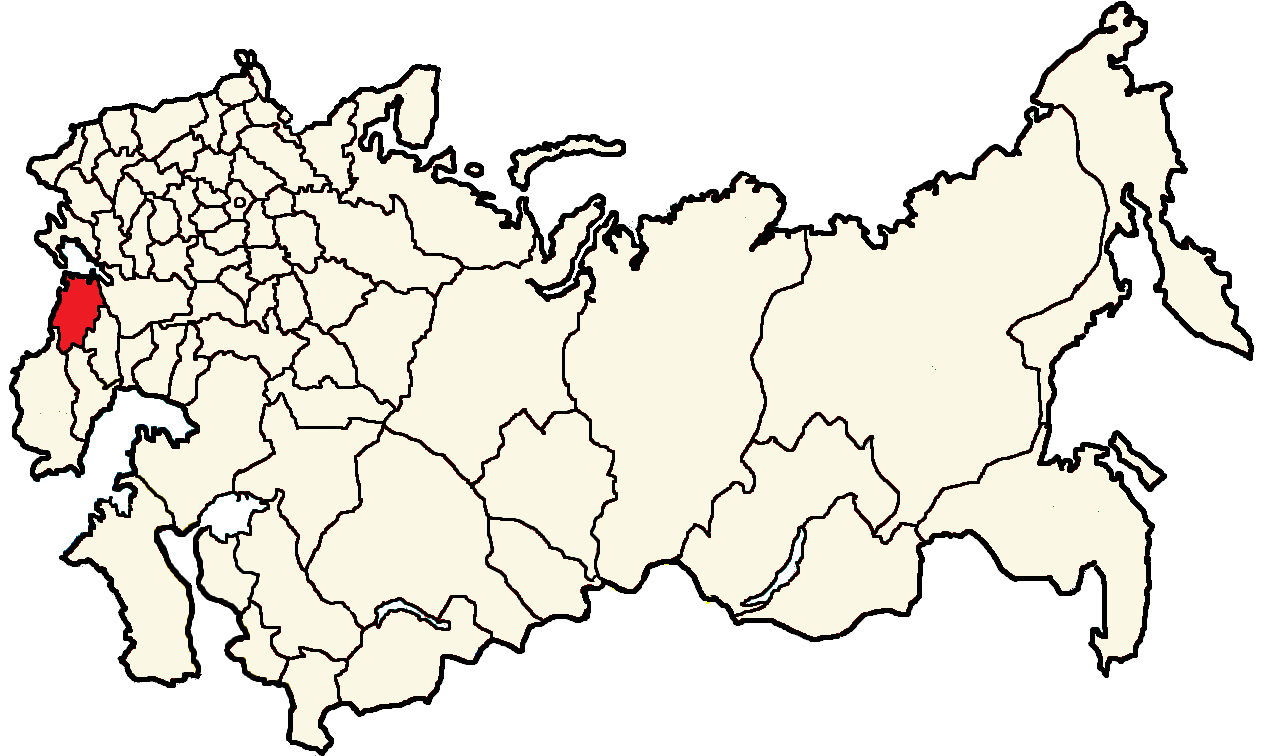

Former constituency
- Created: 1917
- Abolished: 1918
- Number of members: 16
- Number of Uyezd Electoral Commissions: 10
- Number of Urban Electoral Commissions: 4
- Number of Parishes: 453

The Kuban-Black Sea electoral district (Russian: Кубанско-Черноморский избирательный округ) was a constituency created for the 1917 Russian Constituent Assembly election.

The electoral district covered the Kuban Oblast and the Black Sea Governorate. The draft legislation for the election had included Kuban Oblast, the Black Sea Governorate, the Terek Oblast and the Dagestan Oblast into a single constituency. However, in the final law the constituency was delimitated to Kuban Oblast and the Black Sea Governorate. Originally assigned 14 seats, by decree of the Provisional Government the number of deputies of the Kuban-Black Sea district was increased to 16. Kuban was fully engulfed by civil war by the time of the vote. The election was only held in Ekaterinodar and some surrounding villages where the Kuban Territorial Council was in control, - and notably the vote was held February 2-6, 1918 (i.e. after the disbanding of the Constituent Assembly).

Ekaterinodar
Party	Vote	%
List 2 - Bolsheviks	8,744	46.0
List 3 - Highlanders and Cossacks	3,544	18.6
List 1 - Kadets	3,206	16.9
List 4 - Socialist-Revolutionaries	2,268	11.9
List 8 - Mensheviks	786	4.1
List 1 - Leftist SRs	357	1.9
Ukrainians (Lists 5 and 9)	98	0.6
