= Terek-Dagestan electoral district =

Constituency of the Russian Republic

Ter-Dagestan
- Former Civilian constituency for the All-Russian Constituent Assembly
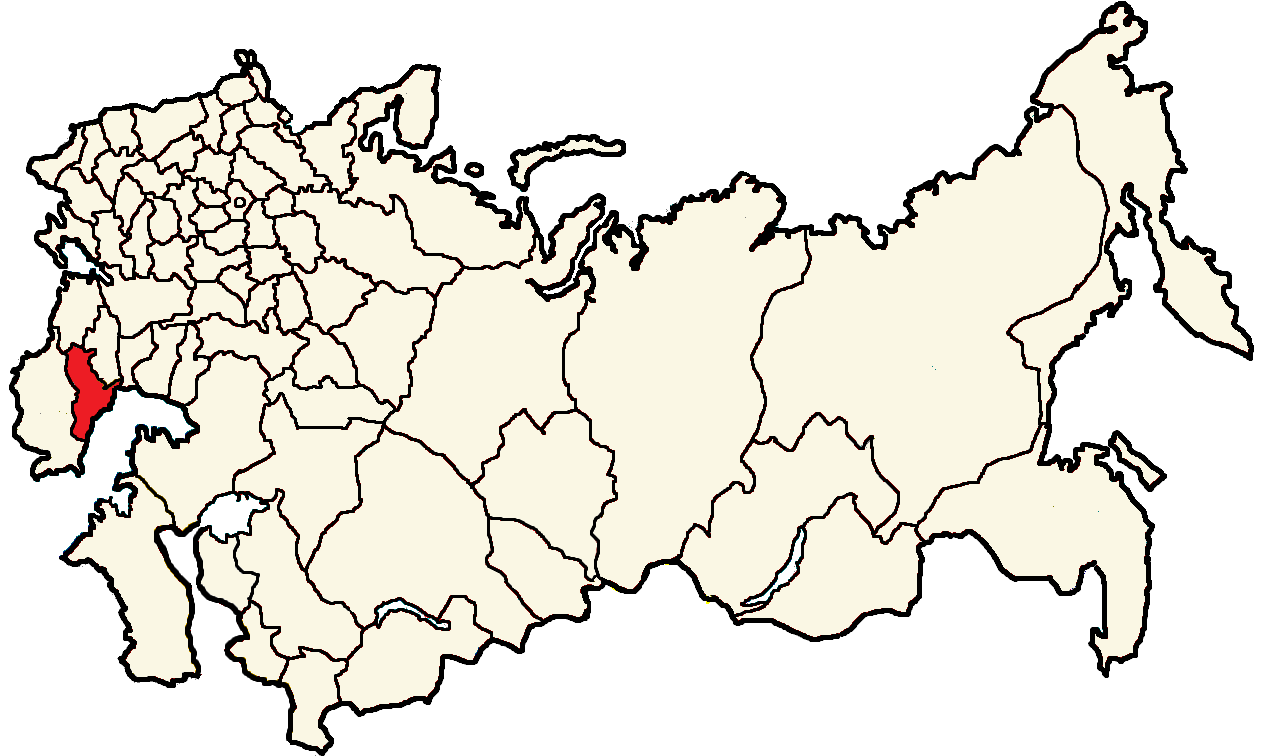

Former constituency
- Created: 1917
- Abolished: 1918
- Number of members: 10
- Number of Uyezd Electoral Commissions: 19
- Number of Urban Electoral Commissions: 4
- Number of Parishes: 494

The Terek-Dagestan electoral district (Russian: Терско-Дагестанский избирательный округ) was a constituency created for the 1917 Russian Constituent Assembly election.

The electoral district covered the Terek Oblast (except the Karanogai precinct and the aimak of the Kalmyks) and the Dagestan Oblast. Voting was delayed in Terek Oblast and Dagestan and was held between November 26 and December 5. In some areas the votes were counted but not reported, in other areas votes were left uncounted. In the account of U.S. historian Oliver Henry Radkey, the source for the results table below, a complete result was only available for Vladikavkaz city. He includes sporadic results of the major parties in some towns and garrisons. Radkey's account contains no results from rural areas. According to Wade, the election was not carried through to completion in Ter-Dagestan.

Bolsheviks obtained 44% of the vote in Vladikavkaz. This situation could be compared to that by March 1917 the Bolshevik Party had been so weak in the city that it had been decided to form a joint Bolshevik-Menshevik Party Committee in the city. The Bolshevik list had 13 candidates, out of whom 4 were cadres from Vladikavkaz (Buachidze, Mamiia Orakhelashvili, Mamsurov and Mishurov). However, Sergei Kirov, who had been the vice chairman of the joint Bolshevik-Menshevik committee, was not included among the Bolshevik candidates.

== Results ==
Terek-Dagestan
Party	Vote	%
List 7 - Bolsheviks	21,495	55.95
List 5 - Kadets	7,725	20.11
List 8 - Socialist-Revolutionaries	4,292	11.17
List 1 - Cossack	3,062	7.97
List 4 - Mensheviks	958	2.49
List 9 - Chechen-Ingush Peoples	332	0.86
List 10 - Ukrainians	209	0.54
List 2 - Popular Socialists	53	0.14
List 3 - Muslim National Committee	?	
List 6 - Kabardian and Balkarian people and the Russian population of the Nalchik district	?	
List 11 - Dagestan Socialist Group	?	
Unaccounted	291	0.76
Total:	38,417	
