= Tobolsk electoral district =

Electoral district

Tobolsk
- Former Civilian constituency for the All-Russian Constituent Assembly
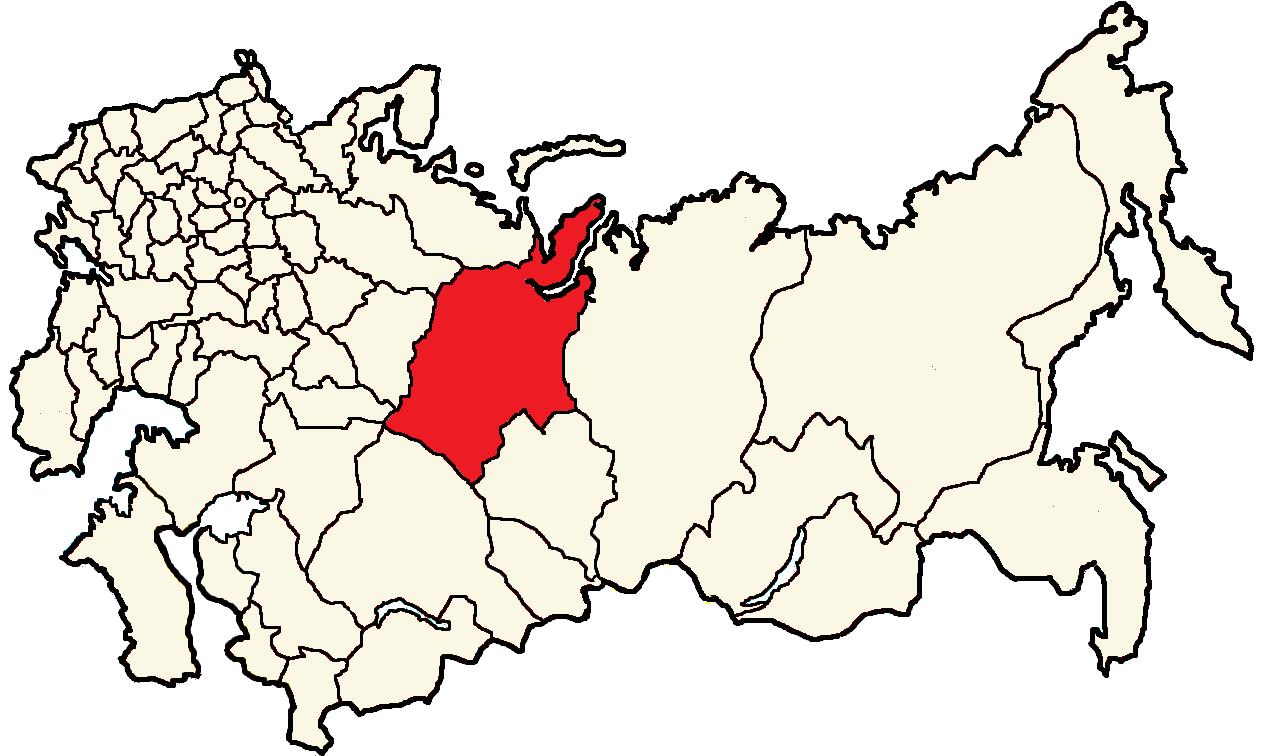

Former constituency
- Created: 1917
- Abolished: 1918
- Number of members: 10
- Number of Uyezd Electoral Commissions: 10
- Number of Urban Electoral Commissions: 1
- Number of Parishes: 270

The Tobolsk electoral district (Russian: Тобольский избирательный округ) was a constituency created for the 1917 Russian Constituent Assembly election.

The electoral district covered the Tobolsk Governorate. Tobolsk hosted one of only 2 undivided Social Democratic lists in the fray across the country. Soviet sources indicated that the Social Democratic list was Menshevik-dominated. In September 1917, the Bolshevik Party in Omsk sent a small soldiers and railway workers to campaign amongst the peasantry in Tobolsk Governorate ahead of the elections.

Soviet sources reported voter turnout at a mere 33.5%.

== Results ==
Tobolsk
Party	Vote	%
List 5 - Socialist-Revolutionaries (Southern Group)	388,328	78.53
List 3 - Peasants Union-Popular Socialists alliance	50,780	10.27
List 4 - Muslims	25,830	5.22
List 1 - Kadets	13,793	2.79
List 2 - Menshevik-Bolshevik alliance	12,061	2.44
List 6 - Socialist-Revolutionaries (Northern Group), leftists	3,733	0.75
Total:	494,525	

Deputies Elected
Sukhanov, A. S.	Peasants Union- Popular Socialists alliance
Barantsev	SR
Evdokimov	SR
Gul'tyaev	SR
Ivanitsky-Vasilenko	SR
Kotelnikov	SR
Krasnousov	SR
Mikhailov	SR
Mukhin	SR
Sukhanov, P. S.	SR
