= Kaluga electoral district =

Constituency of the Russian Republic

Kaluga
- Former Civilian constituency for the All-Russian Constituent Assembly
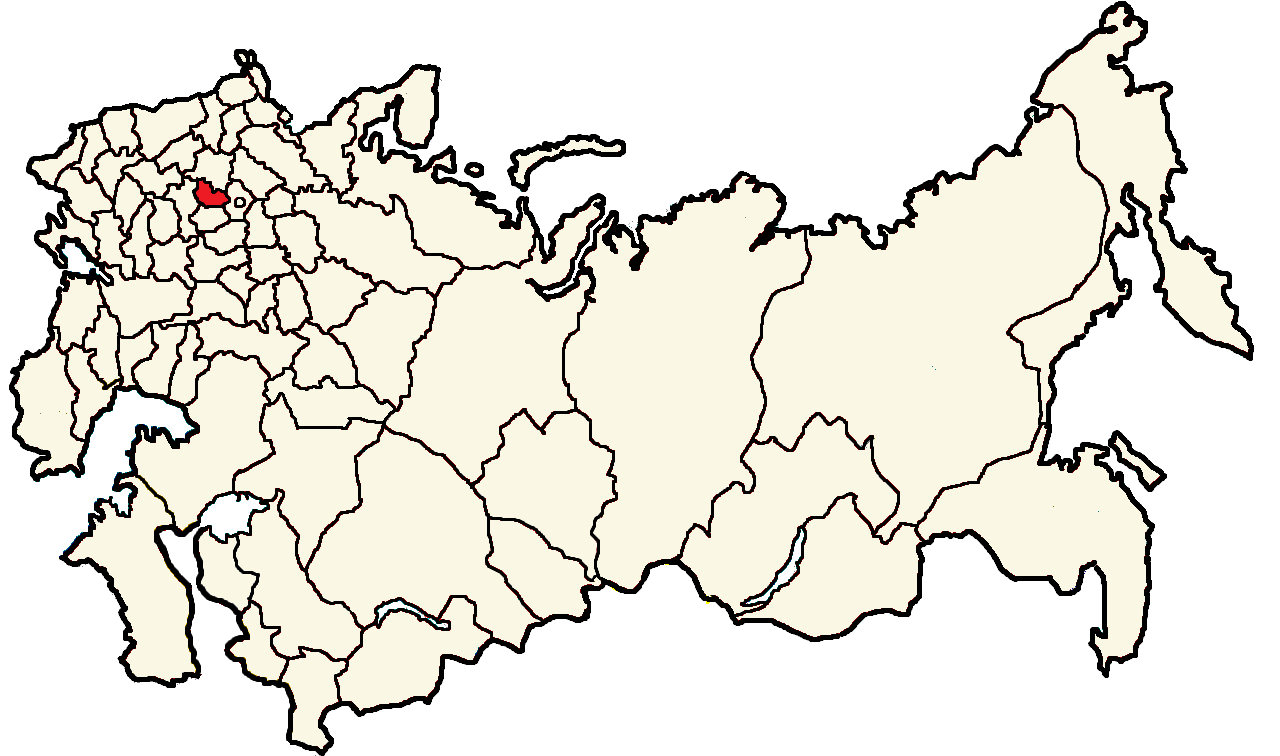

Former constituency
- Created: 1917
- Abolished: 1918
- Number of members: 8
- Number of Uyezd Electoral Commissions: 11
- Number of Urban Electoral Commissions: 1
- Number of Parishes: 199

The Kaluga electoral district (Russian: Калужский избирательный округ) was a constituency created for the 1917 Russian Constituent Assembly election. The electoral district covered the Kaluga Governorate. The constituency was assigned 8 seats in the Constituent Assembly.

In Kaluga, the SR list was dominated by leftist elements.

In Kaluga town the Kadets emerged victorious with 6,857 votes (49.2%), followed by the Bolsheviks with 3,454 votes (24.7%), Mensheviks 2,321 votes (16.7%), SRs 772 votes (5.5%), Gromada 320 votes (2.3%), Old Believers 166 voters (1.2%) and Popular Socialists 54 votes (0.4%). In the town garrison, the Bolsheviks got the major share of votes (1,619 votes, 72.5%), followed by the Kadets 298 votes (13.3%), SRs 203 votes (9.1%), Mensheviks 86 votes (3.9%), Gromada 17 votes (0.7%) and 8 Popular Socialists (0.4%).

== Results ==
Kaluga
Party	Vote	%	Seats
List 7 - Bolsheviks	225,378	57.81	5
List 2 - Socialist-Revolutionaries	127,313	32.65	3
List 3 - Kadets	24,125	6.19	
List 5 - Mensheviks	6,996	1.79	
List 4 - Old Believers	4,409	1.13	
List 6 - Belorussian Socialist Gromada	1,067	0.27	
List 1 - Popular Socialists	601	0.15	
Total:	389,889		8

Deputies Elected
Borodachov	SR
Eliseev	SR
Parol	SR
Ginzburg	Bolshevik
Glebov-Avilov	Bolshevik
Logachev	Bolshevik
Stukov	Bolshevik
Zakharov	Bolshevik
