= Kursk electoral district =

Constituency of the Russian Republic

Kursk
- Former Civilian constituency for the All-Russian Constituent Assembly
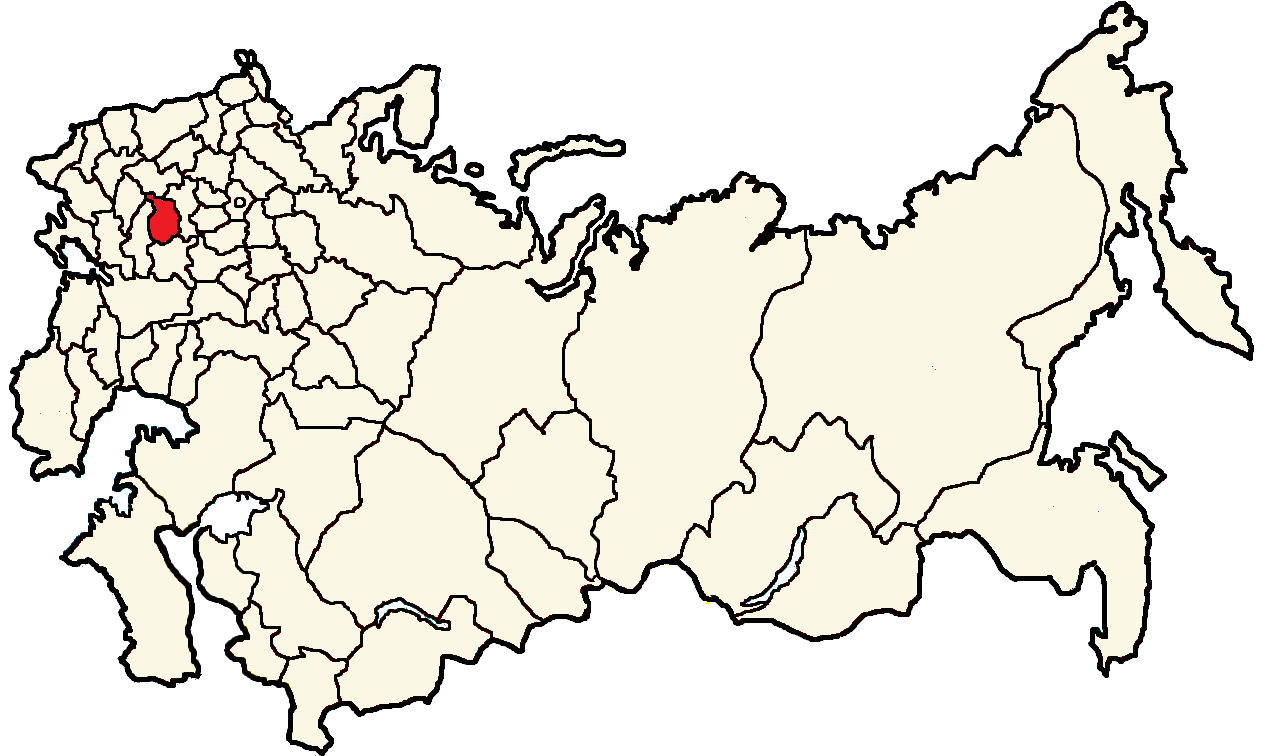

Former constituency
- Created: 1917
- Abolished: 1918
- Number of members: 13
- Number of Uyezd Electoral Commissions: 15
- Number of Urban Electoral Commissions: 1
- Number of Parishes: 198

The Kursk electoral district (Russian: Курский избирательный округ) was a constituency created for the 1917 Russian Constituent Assembly election. The electoral district covered the Kursk Governorate.

Kursk was an agrarian, Black Earth province with no industries. The Bolshevik vote was largely attributed to soldiers returning home from the front. In Kursk town the Kadets got 10,043 votes (45.1%), the Bolsheviks 5,793 votes (26%), SRs 3,876 votes (17.4%), Popular Socialists 1,599 votes (7.2%), Mensheviks 688 votes (3.1%) and Landowners 257 votes (1.2%). 4,143 out of the 5,793 Bolshevik votes came from the town garrison, where the Bolsheviks obtained 58.2%. The second largest party in the Kursk garrison were the SRs (2,169 votes, 30.5%).

== Results ==
Kursk
Party	Vote	%	Seats
List 1 - Socialist-Revolutionaries	868,743	82.08	12
List 4 - Bolsheviks	119,127	11.26	1
List 2 - Kadets	47,199	4.46	
List 5 - Union of Landowners	8,656	0.82	
List 3 - Popular Socialists	8,594	0.81	
List 6 - Mensheviks	6,037	0.57	
Total:	1,058,356		13

Deputies Elected
Baryshnikov	SR
Belosov	SR
Doroshev	SR
Kholodov	SR
Kutepov	SR
Merkulov	SR
Neruchev	SR
Pakhomov	SR
Piyanich	SR
Romanenko	SR
Rusanov	SR
Vlasov	SR
Ozemblovsky	Bolshevik
