= Fergana electoral district =

Constituency of the Russian Republic

Fergana
- Former Civilian constituency for the All-Russian Constituent Assembly
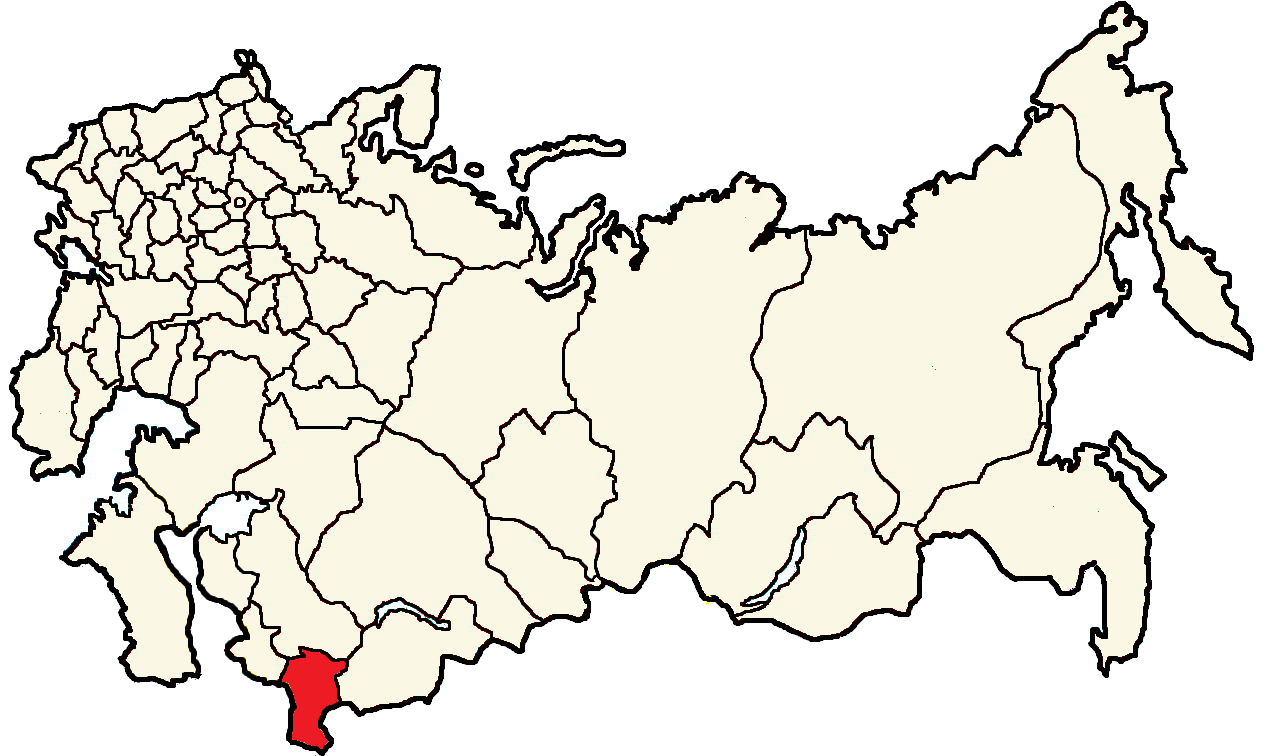

Former constituency
- Created: 1917
- Abolished: 1918
- Number of members: 10
- Number of Uyezd Electoral Commissions: 5
- Number of Urban Electoral Commissions: 6
- Number of Parishes: 103

Fergana electoral district (Russian: ферганский избирательный округ) was a constituency created for the 1917 Russian Constituent Assembly election. The electoral district covered the Fergana Oblast. Two lists were in the fray in Fergana; List 1 - Muinul Islam Society and List 2 - All-Fergana List of Deputies of Muslim Organizations. Spirin (1987) indicates that List 2 had links to the Socialist-Revolutionary Party. In the autumn of 1917, a meeting of the Muslim National Committee and the Musavat Party had decided to field Mammad Amin Rasulzadeh as their candidate in Fergana.

The results in the table below are based on data from Soviet historian L. M. Spirin. U.S. historian Oliver Henry Radkey rejected these results as unreliable.

== Results ==
Fergana
Party	Vote	%
List 1 - Muinil Islam Society	76,849	49.86
List 2 - All Fergana List of Soviet of Deputies of Muslim Organizations	77,282	50.14
Total:	154,131	

Deputies Elected
Khodzhaev	Muinil Islam Society
Tyuryayev	Muinil Islam Society
Akaev	All-Fergana List of Muslim Organizations
Chaykin	All-Fergana List of Muslim Organizations
Shokay	All-Fergana List of Muslim Organizations
Mirza-Akhmedov	All-Fergana List of Muslim Organizations
Shagiakhmetov	All-Fergana List of Muslim Organizations
Shashahmedov	All-Fergana List of Muslim Organizations
Urazaev	All-Fergana List of Muslim Organizations
Yuldash-Kariev	All-Fergana List of Muslim Organizations
Yurgul-Agayev	All-Fergana List of Muslim Organizations
