= Irkutsk electoral district =

Former Civilian constituency

Irkutsk
- Former Civilian constituency for the All-Russian Constituent Assembly
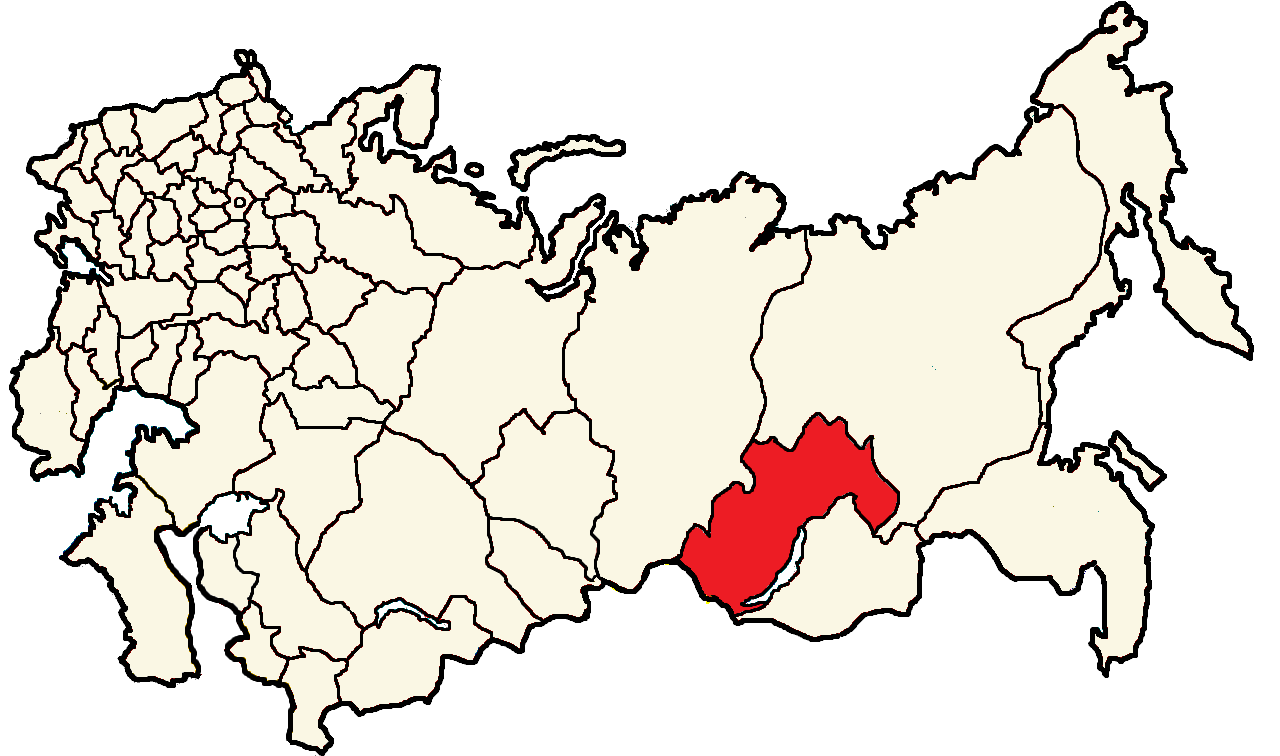

Former constituency
- Created: 1917
- Abolished: 1918
- Number of members: 5
- Number of Uyezd Electoral Commissions: 7
- Number of Urban Electoral Commissions: 1
- Number of Parishes: 116

The Irkutsk electoral district (Russian: Иркутский избирательный округ) was a constituency created for the 1917 Russian Constituent Assembly election. The electoral district covered the Irkutsk Governorate. The constituency was assigned 5 seats in the Constituent Assembly.

== Results ==
In Irkutsk town the SR list got 8,664 votes (33.9%), the Bolsheviks 7,815 votes (31.6%), Kadets 5,537 votes (21.7%), Mensheviks 1,610 votes (6.3%), Autonomists and Popular Socialist list 1,068 votes (4.2%), Orthodox list 807 votes (3.2%) and the Buryat list 28 votes (0.1%). The Irkutsk garrison constituted a major share of the urban electorate, in the garrison the SRs got 6,064 votes (31.5%), the Bolsheviks 5,906 votes (30.7%), the Kadets 4,740 votes (24.6%), Mensheviks 1,097 votes (5.7%), the Autonomists/Popular Socialists 901 votes (4.7%), the Orthodox list 520 votes (2.7%) and the Buryat list 23 votes (0.1%).

Irkutsk
Party	Vote	%	Seats
List 1 - Socialist-Revolutionaries and Peasants Union	113,378	54.47	3
List 5 - Buryat National Committee, SRs	39,248	18.85	1
List 7 - Bolsheviks and Menshevik-Internationalists	31,587	15.17	1
List 4 - Kadets	8,834	4.24	
List 3 - Siberian Autonomist and Popular Socialists	6,925	3.33	
List 2 - Mensheviks	5,534	2.66	
List 6 - Orthodox parishes	2,653	1.27	
Total:	208,159		5

Deputies Elected
Korshunov	SR
Krol	SR
Timofeev	SR
Vampiloon	Buryat
Gavrilov	Bolshevik
