= Bednota =

1918–1931 Soviet daily newspaper

Bednota (Russian: Беднота, "Poverty" or "The poor") was a daily newspaper designed and focused toward a peasant readership that was issued by the Central Committee of the Communist Party of the Soviet Union in Moscow, Russia, from March 1918 to January 1931. It has been described as the first Soviet newspaper "designed primarily for the lower-class or common reader".

One of its predecessors was the Petrograd-based newspaper Derevenskaya Bednota, which Soviet leadership forced to merge with Bednota. Two additional newspapers, Soldatskaya Pravda, printed in Petrograd and Derevenskaya Pravda, printed in Moscow, were also merged with Bednota in 1919, per a decision of the Central Committee of the Communist Party for this to occur. (Note: "The newspaper was founded by decision of the C.C. of the R.C.P. (B .) in lieu of the newspapers Derevenskaya Bednota (The Rural Poor), Derevenskaya Pravda (Rural Truth) and Soldatskaya Pravda (Soldiers ' Truth)") (Note: "The first issue of the CC RKP(b) newspaper Bednota appeared, replacing the newspapers Soldatskaya Pravda (Soldiers' truth) and Derevenskaya Bednota (The village poor), which had been published in Petrograd, and the Moscow-based newspaper Derevenskaya Pravda (Village truth).")

== Overview ==
Bednota served as a means for the Communist party to spread propaganda among the peasant population in the Soviet Union. (Note: "From the outset of the New Economic Policy, journalists had been expected to function as propagandists. But newspaper publishers, unchecked by market forces, ignored popular taste so that the materials their journalists produced were of no interest to most readers.") At the time, peasants accounted for over 70% of the Russian population, and Bednota was created by the Bolsheviks as a means to address this aspect of the citizenry. During its heyday, Bednota had the highest circulation amongst all of the peasant newspapers in the Soviet Union. The newspaper also featured letters from peasants and various correspondences. During the Russian Civil War (7 November 1917 — 16 June 1923), Bednota was the Red Army's paper as well – in June 1920 the Red Army's received circulation of Bednota totaled 265,000.

At times, Vladimir Lenin was directly involved in making suggestions and editorial decisions for Bednota. For example, Lenin made a recommendation to Bednota for the publication to sort and organize the letters to the editor it received and to take note of matters that were important or new in the letters. Lenin also advised that we wanted to be kept abreast about the content of reader's letters. Lenin kept a close study of content that Soviet newspapers published in general, and also had a strong special interest in Bednota's letters to the editor received from peasants, which Lenin valued highly. Vyacheslav Karpinsky, one of the editors of Bednota, was personally acquainted with Lenin, and Karpinsky even named his son, Len Karpinsky, after Lenin. One of Lenin's requirements was for Karpinsky to provide reports directly to him quantifying the number of letters received by the newspaper. During the Russian Civil War, Lenin ordered Bednota and the state-controlled Pravda to "forward letters to him on a regular basis". During Bednota's earlier days, Inessa Armand (8 May 1874 – 24 September 1920), a very close friend of Lenin's, was the editor for the Women's sections of Bednota and Pravda.

During the spring of 1919, Bednota and pravda both began publishing short coverage about "Volunteer Saturdays", for citizens to assist with work in various enterprises and railroad repair shops. One of Bednota's pieces included information about 130 volunteer mechanics and engineers who worked to repair 49 rail cars on a Volunteer Saturday, which began with a headline stating, "If Only Everyone Would Do This".

During the first few years of the New Economic Policy in the Soviet Union, which commenced in March 1921, some newspapers had problems in getting their publications out into rural areas. In the book The Birth of the Propaganda State it is posited that at this time, Bednota, the leading peasant newspaper at that time, was "completely unable to overcome the difficulties". The book denotes that at the time, while Bednota did focus on agricultural problems and issues, it was not written in a style that appealed to a peasant readership. It is further posited that Bednota had far more appeal and readership among activist Bolsheviks that worked in the countryside.

In May 1923, the Soviet leadership stepped up a campaign of "political mobilization" in response to perceived threats from the United Kingdom after George Curzon, 1st Marquess Curzon of Kedleston gave an ultimatum to the Soviet government to repeal the death penalty for British spies captured in the Soviet Union, to abandon the dissemination of propaganda against the United Kingdom, and for Soviet leaders in Afghanistan, India and Persia to be recalled. The British ultimatum was based in part upon Communist International's work to incite revolutionary activities in Afghanistan, India and Persia that went against the interests of the United Kingdom. During this time, Vladimir Lenin's health was also seriously declining, which led Soviet leadership to entertain notions that foreign countries were assuming that Soviet leadership was weakening, and could potentially be overthrown. These factors all led to Bednota's editorial focus shifting to publish more coverage regarding foreign affairs. At that time, the newspaper's overall content contained more information about international matters and the Soviet Army, and much less about agricultural issues.

Despite its design and editorial focus to attract lower-class readers, Bednota did not gain a relatively-large readership. At times, Bednota and some other newspapers were criticized by some Communist Party leaders for being "unreadable" because of typographical errors, spacing errors, ambiguous headlines, poor grammar, poor typesetting and graphics, making it and some other newspapers at the time "incomprehensible".

In 1931 the newspaper ceased to exist after being merged with "Socialisticheskoe Zemledelye" (Socialist Agriculture).

== Editors ==
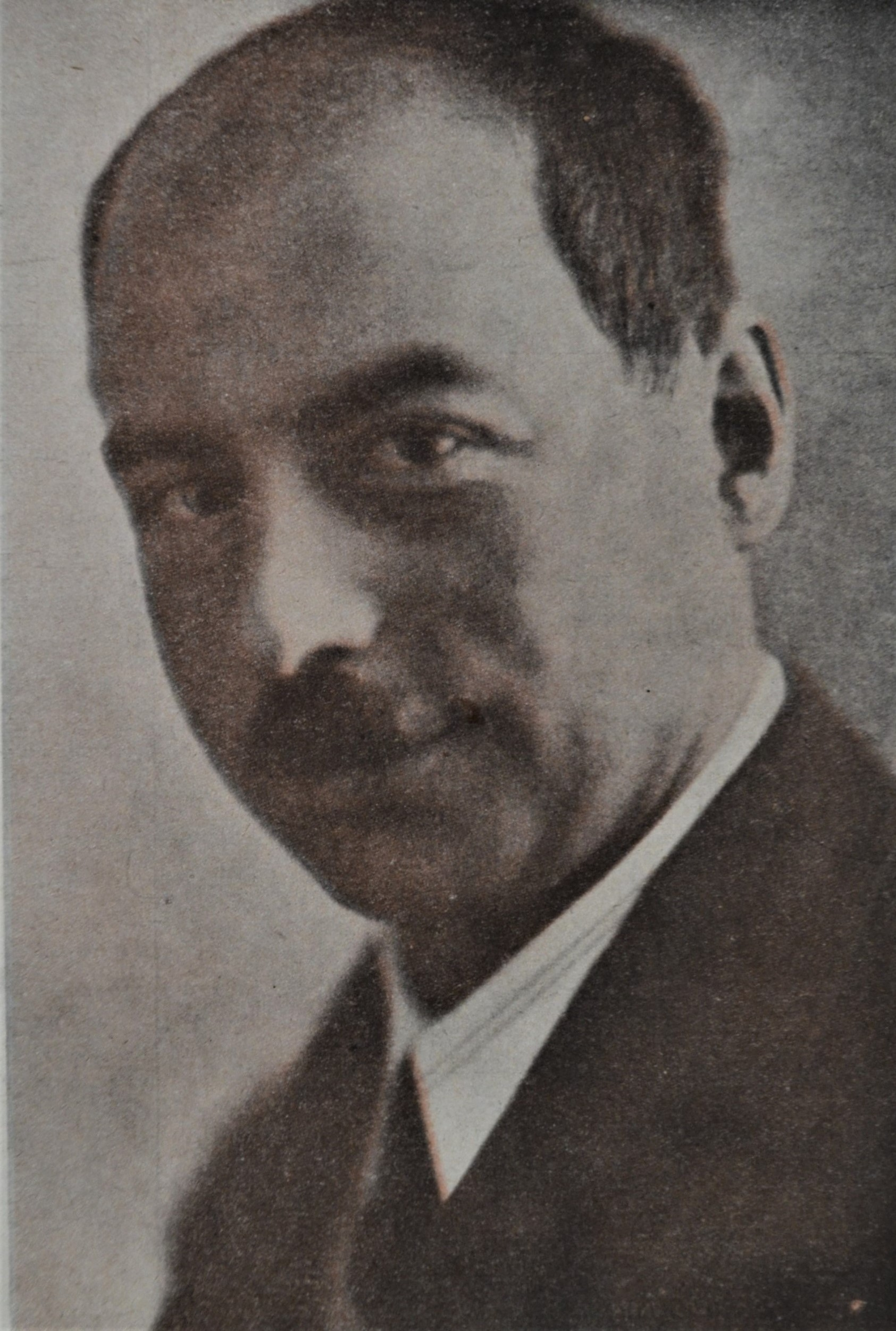
Yakov Yakovlev in 1929

- Vyacheslav Karpinsky (from 1918 to 1922 with interruptions)
- Lev Sosnovsky (from March 1918, and also in 1921)
- Yakov Yakovlev (from 1924)
- M.S.Grandov (from 1928)
- E.P. Atakov (from 1929)

== See also ==
- Printed media in the Soviet Union

Publications of the Communist Party of the Soviet Union:

- Kommunist – Theoretical organ of the Communist Party of the Soviet Union
- Komunisti – Daily newspaper published by the Georgian Communist Party Central Committee
- Nash Put (1913) – Russian daily newspaper
- Novy Mir (1916 magazine) – magazine published in New York City in 1916–1917
- Pravda – Russian newspaper founded in 1912
- Rabochaya Gazeta (1922) – newspaper
- Zarya (publication) – Marxist Scientific and Political Journal
