= History of the Communist Party of the Soviet Union =

Aspect of Soviet political history

The history of the Communist Party of the Soviet Union was generally perceived as covering that of the Bolshevik faction of the Russian Social Democratic Labour Party from which it evolved. In 1912, the party formally split, and the predecessor to the Communist Party of the Soviet Union became a distinct entity. Its history since then can roughly be divided into the following periods:

- the early years of the Bolshevik Party in secrecy and exile
- the period of the October Revolution of 1917
- consolidation of the party as the governing force of the Soviet Union
- the Great Purge of the 1930s
- the Khrushchev and Brezhnev periods (1956–1982)
- the Gorbachev era of reform (1985–1991), which eventually led to the break-up of the party in 1991. The history of the regional and republican branches of the party does however differ from the all-Russian and all-Union party on several points.

== Nomenclature ==
With its lineal predecessors and soi-disant heirs, the party used various names in succession:

- 1898 – 1912: Russian Social Democratic Labour Party – RSDLP (Russian: Российская социал-демократическая рабочая партия – РСДРП)
- 1912 – 8 March 1918: Russian Social Democratic Labour Party (Bolsheviks) (Russian: Российская социал-демократическая рабочая партия (большевиков); РСДРП(б), romanized: Rossiyskaya sotsial-demokraticheskaya rabochaya partiya (bol'shevikov); RSDRP(b))
- 8 March 1918 – 31 December 1925: Russian Communist Party (Bolsheviks) (Russian: Российская коммунистическая партия (большевиков); РКП(б), romanized: Rossiyskaya kommunisticheskaya partiya (bol'shevikov); RKP(b))
- 31 December 1925 – 14 October 1952: All-Union Communist Party (Bolsheviks) (Russian: Всесоюзная коммунистическая партия (большевиков); ВКП(б), romanized: Vsesoyuznaya kommunisticheskaya partiya (bol'shevikov); VKP(b))
- 14 October 1952 – 6 November 1991: Communist Party of the Soviet Union (Russian: Коммунистическая партия Советского Союза; КПСС, romanized: Kommunisticheskaya partiya Sovetskogo Soyuza; KPSS)
- 6 November 1991–: various, including Communist Party of the Russian Federation (Russian: Коммунистическая Партия Российской Федерации – КПРФ)

== Formation of RSDLP(b) ==
In January 1912, the Bolshevik faction of the RSDLP convened a 6th All-Russian Party Conference in Prague, in the absence of their Menshevik adversaries. Over twenty Party organizations were represented. In the eyes of the Bolsheviks the conference had, therefore, the significance of a regular Party congress.

In the statement of the conference which announced that the shattered central apparatus of the Party had been restored and a new Central Committee set up is the following statement: "Not only have the banner of the Russian Social-Democratic Party, its program and its revolutionary traditions survived, but so has its organization, which persecution may have undermined and weakened, but could never utterly destroy." Moreover, the conference declared the Mensheviks expelled from the party. Thus the RSDLP effectively split, with the Bolsheviks and Mensheviks constituting separate political parties (Both groups would continue to use the name "RSDLP". The Bolshevik party added "bolshevik" to their name to differentiate themselves from the Mensheviks.)

In its resolution on the reports presented by the local organizations, the conference noted that "energetic work is being conducted everywhere among the Social-Democratic workers with the object of strengthening the local illegal Social-Democratic organizations and groups". The conference noted that the most important rule of Bolshevik tactics in periods of retreat - to combine illegal work with legal work within the various legally existing workers' societies and unions - was being observed in all the localities.

The Prague Conference elected a Bolshevik Central Committee of the Party, consisting of:

- Vladimir Lenin
- Joseph Stalin
- Sergo Ordzhonikidze
- Yakov Sverdlov
- Suren Spandaryan
- Filipp Goloshchyokin
- Others

Stalin and Sverdlov won election to the Central Committee despite their non-attendance at the conference, as they were in exile at the time. The elected alternate members of the Central Committee included Mikhail Kalinin.

For the direction of revolutionary work in Russia a practical center (the Russian Bureau of the C.C.) was set up, with Stalin at its head and including Y. Sverdlov, Spandaryan, S. Ordzhonikidze, M. Kalinin and Goloshchekin.

Writing to Maxim Gorky at the beginning of 1912, on the results of the Prague Conference, Lenin said:

At last we have succeeded, in spite of the Liquidator scum, in restoring the Party and its Central Committee. I hope you will rejoice with us over the fact.

Speaking of the significance of the Prague Conference, Stalin said:

This conference was of the utmost importance in the history of our Party, for it drew a boundary line between the Bolsheviks and the Mensheviks and amalgamated the Bolshevik organizations all over the country into a united Bolshevik Party.

In the summer of 1912, Lenin moved from Paris to Galicia in order to be nearer to Russia, and there he presided over two conferences of members of the Central Committee and leading Party workers, one of which took place in Kraków at the end of 1912, and the other in Poronino, a small town near Kraków, in the autumn of 1913. These conferences adopted decisions on questions relating to the working-class movement including the rise in the revolutionary movement, the Party tasks in connection with the strikes, the strengthening of the illegal organizations, the Social-Democratic group in the Duma, the Party press, and the labor insurance campaign.

== Emergence of Pravda ==
An important instrument used by the Bolshevik Party to strengthen its organizations and to spread its influence among the masses was the Bolshevik daily newspaper Pravda (Truth), published in St. Petersburg. It was founded, according to Lenin's instructions, on the initiative of Stalin, Olminsky and Poletayev. Pravda was intended as a legal, mass working-class paper founded simultaneously with the new rise of the revolutionary movement. Its first issue appeared on 5 May [O.S. 22 April] 1912.

Previous to the appearance of Pravda, the Bolsheviks already had a weekly newspaper called Zvezda, intended for advanced workers. Zvezda had played an important part at the time of the Lena events. It printed a number of political articles by Lenin and Stalin. But the Party felt that with the revolutionary upsurge, a weekly newspaper no longer met the requirements of the Bolshevik Party. According to the analysis of the Party leadership, a daily mass political newspaper designed for the broadest sections of the workers was needed. Thus Pravda was founded.

The tsarist government suppressed Pravda eight times in the space of two and a half years; but each time, with the support of the workers, it reappeared under a new but similar name, e.g., Za Pravdu (For Truth), Put Pravdy (Path of Truth), Trudovaya Pravda (Labour Truth), etc..

Whilst the average circulation of Pravda was 40,000 copies per day, the circulation of Luch (Ray), the Menshevik daily, did not exceed 15,000 or 16,000.

In Moscow, the party launched Nash Put as a workers newspaper in September 1913. It was banned after just a few editions were published.

== Work in the Duma ==
Another legally functioning central organ of the Party was the Bolshevik group in the Fourth State Duma. In 1912 the government decreed elections to the Fourth Duma. The RSDLP(b) decided to participate in the elections. The RSDLP(b) acted independently, under its own slogans, in the Duma elections, simultaneously attacking both the government parties and the liberal bourgeoisie (Constitutional-Democrats). The slogans of the Bolsheviks in the election campaign were a democratic republic, an 8-hour day and the confiscation of the landed estates.

The elections to the Fourth Duma were held in the autumn of 1912. At the beginning of October, the government, dissatisfied with the course of the elections in St. Petersburg, tried to encroach on the electoral rights of the workers in a number of the large factories. In reply, the St. Petersburg Committee of the RSDLP(b), on Stalin's proposal, called upon the workers of the large factories to declare a one-day strike.

Placed in a difficult position, the government was forced to yield, and the workers were able at their meetings to elect whom they wanted. The vast majority of the workers voted for the 'Mandate (Nakaz) of the Workingmen of St. Petersburg to Their Labour Deputy' to their delegates and the deputy, which had been drawn up by Stalin. The Mandate declared that the future actions of the people should take the form of a struggle on two fronts—against the tsarist government and against the liberal bourgeoisie. In the end, RSDLP(b) candidate Badayev was elected to the Duma by the workers of St. Petersburg.

The workers voted in the elections to the Duma separately from other sections of the population (this was known as the worker curia). Of the nine deputies elected from the worker curia, six were members of the RSDLP(b): Badayev, Petrovsky, Muranov, Samoilov, Shagov and Malinovsky (the latter subsequently turned out to be an agentprovocateur). The Bolshevik deputies were elected from the big industrial centres, in which not less than four-fifths of the working class were concentrated. After the election, the RSDLP(b) formed a joint Social-Democratic Duma group together with the Mensheviks (who had seven seats). In October 1913, after a series of controversies with the Mensheviks, the RSDLP(b) Duma members, on the instructions of the Central Committee of the Party, withdrew from the joint Social-Democratic group and formed an independent Bolshevik Duma group.

In the Duma, the Bolsheviks introduced a bill providing for an 8-hour working day. It was voted down, but had a significant agitational value for the Bolsheviks.

== Outbreak of World War I ==
In July 1914 the Tsarist government called for general mobilization. Russia entered into war with the German Empire. The First World War had begun.

The RSDLP(b) denounced the war as imperialist. Moreover, the party denounced the European Social Democratic parties, who supported the war efforts of their respective countries, as 'social-chauvinists'. From the very outbreak of the war Lenin began to muster forces for the creation of a new International, the Third International. In the manifesto against the war it issued in November 1914, the Central Committee of the Bolshevik Party already called for the formation of the Third International in place of the Second International.

In February 1915, a conference of Socialists of the Entente countries was held in London. The RSDLP(b) delegate Maxim Litvinov, on Lenin's instructions, spoke at this conference demanding that the Socialists should resign from the national governments of Belgium and France, completely break with the imperialists and refuse to collaborate with them. He demanded that all Socialists should wage a determined struggle against their imperialist governments and condemn the voting of war credits. But no voice in support of Litvinov was raised at this conference.

At the beginning of September 1915 the first conference of internationalists was held in Zimmerwald. Lenin called this conference the 'first step' in the development of an international movement against the war. At this conference Lenin formed the Zimmerwald Left group. But Lenin felt that within the Zimmerwald Left group only the RSDLP(b) had taken a correct and thoroughly consistent stand against the war.

The Zimmerwald Left group published a magazine in German called the Vorbote (Herald), to which Lenin contributed articles. In 1916 the internationalists succeeded in convening a second conference in the Swiss village of Kienthal. It is known as the Second Zimmerwald Conference. By this time groups of internationalists had been formed in nearly every European country and the cleavage between the internationalist elements and the 'social-chauvinists' had become more sharply defined.

The manifesto drawn up by the Kienthal Conference was the result of an agreement between various conflicting groups; it was an advance on the Zimmerwald Manifesto. But like the Zimmerwald Conference, the Kienthal Conference did not accept the basic principles of the Bolshevik policy, namely, the conversion of the imperialist war into a civil war, the defeat of one's own imperialist government in the war, and the formation of the Third International. Nevertheless, the Kienthal Conference helped to crystallize the internationalist elements of whom the Communist Third International was subsequently formed.

At the beginning of the war, in spite of persecution by the police, the Bolshevik members of the Duma– Badayev, Petrovsky, Muranov, Samoilov and Shagov– visited a number of organizations and addressed them on the policy of the Bolsheviks towards the war and revolution. In November 1914 a conference of the Bolshevik group in the State Duma was convened to discuss policy towards the war. On the third day of the conference all present were arrested. The court sentenced the Bolshevik members of the State Duma to forfeiture of civil rights and banishment to Eastern Siberia. The tsarist government charged them with high treason.

At this point Lev Kamenev deviated from the party line. He declared in the court that he did not agree with the party on the question of the war, and to prove this he requested that the Menshevik Jordansky be summoned as witness.

The Bolsheviks campaigned against the War Industry Committees set up to serve the needs of war, and advocated boycott of the elections of 'Workers Groups' of the committee.

The Bolsheviks also developed extensive activities in the army and navy. The party formed nuclei in the army and navy, at the front and in the rear, and distributed leaflets calling for a fight against the war. In Kronstadt, the Bolsheviks formed a 'Central Collective of the Kronstadt Military Organization' which had close connections with the Petrograd Committee of the Party. A military organization of the Petrograd Party Committee was set up for work among the garrison.

In August 1916, the chief of the Petrograd Okhrana reported that 'in the Kronstadt Collective, things are very well organized, conspiratorially, and its members are all taciturn and cautious people. This Collective also has representatives on shore.'

At the front, the party agitated for fraternization between the soldiers of the warring armies, claiming that the world bourgeoisie was the enemy, and that the war could be ended only by converting the imperialist war into a civil war and turning one's weapons against one's own bourgeoisie and its government. Cases of refusal of army units to take the offensive became more and more frequent. There were already such instances in 1915, and even more in 1916.

Particularly extensive were the activities of the Bolsheviks in the armies on the Northern Front, in the Baltic provinces. At the beginning of 1917 General Nikolai Ruzsky, Commander of the Army on the Northern Front, informed Headquarters that the Bolsheviks had developed intense revolutionary activities on that front.

== Bolsheviks during the 1917 Revolutions ==
=== February Revolution ===
The year 1917 was inaugurated by the strike of January 22 [O.S. January 9]. In the course of this strike demonstrations were held in Petrograd, Moscow, Baku and Nizhni Novgorod. In Moscow about one-third of the workers took part in the strike of January 22. A demonstration of two thousand persons on Tverskoi Boulevard was dispersed by mounted police. A demonstration on the Vyborg Chaussée in Petrograd was joined by soldiers. "The idea of a general strike," the Petrograd police reported, "is daily gaining new followers and is becoming as popular as it was in 1905."

On 3 March [O.S. 18 February] 1917, a strike broke out at the Putilov Works in Petrograd. On March 7 [O.S. February 22] the workers of most of the big factories were on strike. On International Women's Day, March 8 [O.S. February 23], at the call of the Petrograd Bolshevik Committee, working women came out in the streets to demonstrate against starvation, war and tsardom. The Petrograd workers supported the demonstration of the working women by a citywide strike movement. The political strike began to grow into a general political demonstration against the tsarist system.

On March 9 [O.S. February 24] the demonstration was resumed with even greater vigour. About 200,000 workers were already on strike. On March 10 [O.S. February 25] large sections of working-class Petrograd had joined the revolutionary movement. The political strikes in the districts merged into a general political strike of the whole city. Demonstrations and clashes with the police took place everywhere. Slogans were raised like "Down with the tsar!", "Down with the war!", "We want bread!"

On the morning of March 11 [O.S. February 26] the political strike and demonstration began to assume the character of an uprising. The workers disarmed police and gendarmes and armed themselves. Nevertheless, the clashes with the police ended with the shooting down of a demonstration on Znamenskaya Square. General Sergey Semyonovich Khabalov, Commander of the Petrograd Military District, announced that the workers must return to work by March 13 [O.S. February 28], otherwise they would be sent to the front. On March 10 [O.S. February 25] the tsar gave orders to General Khabalov: "I command you to put a stop to the disorders in the capital not later than tomorrow." But "to put a stop" to the revolution was no longer possible.

On March 11 [O.S. February 26] the 4th Company of the Reserve Battalion of the Pavlovsky Regiment opened fire, not on the workers, however, but on squads of mounted police who were engaged in a skirmish with the workers. A most energetic and persistent drive was made to win over the troops, especially by the working women, who addressed themselves directly to the soldiers, fraternized with them and called upon them to help the people to overthrow the tsarist autocracy. The practical work of the Bolshevik Party at that time was directed by the Bureau of the Central Committee of the Party which had its quarters in Petrograd and was headed by Vyacheslav Molotov. On February 26 (March 11) the Bureau of the Central Committee issued a manifesto calling for the continuation of the armed struggle against tsardom and the formation of a Provisional Revolutionary Government.

On March 12 [O.S. February 27] the troops in Petrograd refused to fire on the workers and began to line up with the people in revolt. The number of soldiers who had joined the revolt by the morning of March 12 was still no more than 10,000, but by the evening it already exceeded 60,000.

The workers and soldiers who had risen in revolt began to arrest tsarist ministers and generals and to free revolutionaries from jail. The released political prisoners joined the revolutionary struggle. In the streets, shots were still being exchanged with police and gendarmes posted with machine guns in the attics of houses. But the troops rapidly went over to the side of the workers, and this decided the fate of the Tsarist autocracy. When the news of the victory of the revolution in Petrograd spread to other towns and to the front, the workers and soldiers everywhere began to depose the tsarist officials.

On 12 March [O.S. 27 February] 1917, the liberal members of the Fourth State Duma, as the result of a backstairs agreement with the Socialist-Revolutionary and Menshevik leaders, set up a Provisional Committee of the State Duma, headed by Mikhail Rodzyanko, the President of the Duma, a landlord and a monarchist. And a few days later, the Provisional Committee of the State Duma and the Socialist-Revolutionary and Menshevik leaders of the executive committee of the Soviet of Workers' and Soldiers' Deputies, acting secretly from the Bolsheviks, came to an agreement to form a new Provisional Government of Russia, headed by Prince Georgy Lvov. The Provisional Government included Pavel Milyukov, the head of the Constitutional-Democrats, Alexander Guchkov, the head of the Octobrists and the Socialist-Revolutionary Alexander Kerensky amongst others. The Bolsheviks condemned the new provisional government as 'imperialist'.

In the new political atmosphere after the Revolution, the party resumed publishing of legal journals. It resumed the publication of its legal periodicals. Pravda appeared in Petrograd five days after the February Revolution, and Sotsial-Demokrat in Moscow a few days later.

=== Return of Lenin ===
On April 3 (16), 1917, after a long period of exile, Lenin returned to Russia. On his arrival he presented his 'April Theses' to the party, formulating the political line for socialist revolution. Lenin proposed to replace the parliamentary republic by a Soviet republic as the most suitable form of political organization of society in the period of transition from capitalism to Socialism. Furthermore, Lenin suggested discarding the term 'Social Democrat' and replacing it with 'Communist'. He also repeated the call for a new, Third International. The Theses were presented at a party meeting in Petrograd, and subsequently at a meeting of both Bolsheviks and Mensheviks in the same city.

On April 14 a Petrograd City Conference of Bolsheviks was held. The conference approved Lenin's theses and made them the basis of its work. Within a short while the local organizations of the Party had also approved Lenin's theses. Opponents of Lenin's included Kamenev, Rykov and Pyatakov.

=== April manifestation ===
On April 20 the Central Committee of the RSDLP(b) called upon the masses to protest against the 'imperialist policy' of the Provisional Government. On April 20–21 (May 3–4), 1917, not less than 100,000 workers and soldiers took part in a demonstration. Their banners bore the demands: "Publish the secret treaties!", "Down with the war!", "All power to the Soviets!". The workers and soldiers marched from the outskirts of the city to the centre, where the Provisional Government was sitting. On the Nevsky Prospect and other places clashes with groups of bourgeois took place.

The more outspoken counter-revolutionaries, like General Lavr Kornilov, demanded that fire be opened on the demonstrators, and even gave orders to that effect. But the troops refused to carry out the orders.

During the demonstration, a small group of members of the Petrograd Party Committee (Bagdatyev and others) issued a slogan demanding the immediate overthrow of the Provisional Government. The Central Committee of the party sharply condemned the conduct this grouping as adventurists, considering this slogan untimely and incorrect, a slogan that hampered the Party in its efforts to win over a majority in the Soviets and ran counter to the party line of a peaceful development of the revolution.

=== 7th party conference ===
On April 24, 1917, the Seventh (April) Conference of the RSDLP(b) assembled. For the first time in the existence of the Party a Bolshevik Conference met openly. In the history of the Party this conference holds a place of importance equal to that of a Party Congress.

The All-Russian April Conference showed that the Party was growing by leaps and bounds. The conference was attended by 133 delegates with vote and by 18 with voice but no vote. They represented 80,000 organized members of the Party. The conference discussed and laid down the Party line on all basic questions of the war and revolution: the current situation, the war, the Provisional Government, the Soviets, the agrarian question, the national question, etc.

In his report, Lenin elaborated the principles he had already set forth in the April Theses. The task of the Party was to effect the transition from the first stage of the revolution, "which placed the power in the hands of the bourgeoisie . . . to the second stage, which must place the power in the hands of the proletariat and the poorest strata of the peasantry" (Lenin). The course the Party should take was to prepare for the Socialist revolution. The immediate task of the Party was set forth by Lenin in the slogan: "All power to the Soviets!"

The slogan, "All power to the Soviets!" meant that it was necessary to put an end to the dual power, that is, the division of power between the Provisional Government and the Soviets, to transfer the whole power to the Soviets, and to drive the representatives of the landlords and capitalists out of the organs of government.

The conference resolved that the party should agitate towards the people that the Provisional Government represented the landlords and the bourgeoisie, as well as denouncing the policy of cooperation of the Socialist-Revolutionaries and Mensheviks.

The April Conference also discussed the agrarian and national questions. In connection with Lenin's report on the agrarian question, the conference adopted a resolution calling for the confiscation of the landed estates, which were to be placed at the disposal of the peasant committees, and for the nationalization of all the land.

Regarding the national question, Lenin and Stalin declared that the party must support the national liberation movements of oppressed peoples against imperialism. Consequently, the party advocated the right of nations to self-determination even to the point of secession and formation of independent states.

Lev Kamenev and Alexei Rykov opposed Lenin at the Conference. Echoing the Mensheviks, they asserted that Russia was not ripe for a Socialist revolution, and that only a bourgeois republic was possible in Russia. They recommended the Party and the working class to confine themselves to 'controlling' the Provisional Government.

Zinoviev, too, opposed Lenin at the conference; it was on the question whether the Bolshevik Party should remain within the Zimmerwald alliance, or break with it and form a new International. Lenin insisted that as the years of war had shown, while this alliance carried on propaganda for peace, it did not actually break with the bourgeois partisans of the war. Lenin therefore called for immediate withdrawal from this alliance and on the formation of a new, Communist International. Zinoviev proposed that the Party should have remained within the Zimmerwald alliance. Lenin condemned Zinoviev's proposal and called his tactics 'archopportunist and pernicious.'

=== Work in the Soviets ===
On the basis of the decisions of the April Conference, the Party developed extensive activities in order to win over the masses, and to train and organize them for battle. The Party line in that period was to win a majority in the Soviets, by 'explaining the Bolshevik policy and exposing the compromising policy of the Mensheviks and Socialist-Revolutionaries, to isolate these parties from the masses'.

In addition to the work in the Soviets, the Bolsheviks carried on extensive activities in the trade unions and in the factory committees. Particularly extensive was the work of the Bolsheviks in the Russian Army. Military organizations began to arise everywhere. The Bolsheviks worked at the front and in the rear to organize the soldiers and sailors. A particularly important part in making the soldiers active revolutionaries was played at the front by the Bolshevik newspaper, Okopnaya Pravda (Trench Truth).

A Petrograd Conference of Factory Committees was held from May 30 to June 3, 1917. At this conference three-quarters of the delegates already supported the Bolsheviks. Almost the entire Petrograd proletariat supported the Bolshevik slogan—"All power to the Soviets!"

On June 3 (16), 1917, the First All-Russian Congress of Soviets met. The Bolsheviks were still in the minority in the Soviets; they had a little over 100 delegates at this congress, compared with 700 or 800 Mensheviks, Socialist-Revolutionaries and others. At the First Congress of Soviets, the Bolsheviks insistently stressed the consequences of compromise with the bourgeoisie and exposed the imperialist character of the war. Lenin made a speech at the congress in which he declared that 'only a government of Soviets could give bread to the working people, land to the peasants, secure peace and lead the country out of chaos'.

A mass campaign was being conducted at that time in the working-class districts of Petrograd for the organization of a demonstration and for the presentation of demands to the Congress of Soviets. However, the executive committee of the Petrograd Soviet decided to call a demonstration for June 18 (July 1). The Mensheviks and Socialist-Revolutionaries expected that the demonstration would take place under anti-Bolshevik slogans. The Bolshevik Party began energetic preparations for this demonstration. Stalin wrote in Pravda that "...it is our task to make sure that the demonstration in Petrograd on June 18 takes place under our revolutionary slogans." In the rally the Bolshevik slogans prevailed over Menshevik and Socialist-Revolutionary ones.

=== July Days ===
In early July, widespread discontent in St. Petersburg led to militant demonstrations calling for the overthrow of the Provisional Government. Following news of a failed offensive at the front, on July 3 (16) spontaneous demonstrations started in the Vyborg District of Petrograd. They continued all day. The separate demonstrations grew into a huge general armed demonstration demanding the transfer of power to the Soviets. The party was opposed to armed action at that time, for it considered that the revolutionary crisis had not yet matured, that the army and the provinces were not yet prepared to support an uprising in the capital, and that an isolated and premature rising might only make it easier for the counter-revolutionaries to crush the vanguard of the revolution. But when it became obviously impossible to keep the masses from demonstrating, the party resolved to participate in the demonstration. Hundreds of thousands of men and women marched to the headquarters of the Petrograd Soviet and the All-Russian Central Executive Committee of Soviets, where they demanded that the Soviets take the power into their own hands, break with the bourgeoisie, and pursue an active peace policy. Notwithstanding the pacific character of the demonstration, units—detachments of officers and cadets were brought out against it. Many were killed in the skirmishes.

The ensuing crackdown resulted in the Kerensky government ordering the arrest of the Bolshevik leadership on July 19. Lenin escaped capture, went into hiding, and wrote State and Revolution, which outlined his ideas for a socialist government.

=== 6th Party Congress ===
The Sixth Congress of the RSDLP(b) sat in Petrograd from July 26 to August 3 (August 8–16), 1917, in semi-legal conditions. It was attended by 157 delegates voting and 110 delegates with voice but no vote, from 240,000 Party members. Lenin guided the congress from underground. He kept in touch with Petrograd through Bolsheviks assigned by the Central Committee who visited him at Razliv. Lenin's theses "The Political Situation", the article "On Slogans" and other items formed the basis for congress resolutions. While at Razliv, Lenin took part in drafting the most important resolutions of the congress. The congress unanimously elected Lenin its honorary chairman.

The items on the congress agenda were:

(1) Report by the Organising Bureau; (2) Report by the C.C. R.S.D.L.P.(B.); (3) Reports from Local Organisations; (4) Current Situation: (a) The War and the International Situation; (b) The Political and Economic Situation; (5) Revision of the Programme; (6) The Organisational Question; (7) Elections to the Constituent Assembly; (8) The International; (9) Unification of the Party; (10) The Trade Union Movement; (11) Elections; (12) Miscellaneous.

The congress also discussed the question whether Lenin should appear in court.

The congress heard the political report of the Central Committee and the report on the political situation, both of which were presented by Stalin on behalf of the Central Committee. The resolution on the political situation was based on Lenin's guiding recommendations. It appraised the political situation in the country following the July events, and set out the Party's political line at the new stage of the revolution. The congress declared that the peaceful development of the revolution was over and that power in the country had virtually passed into the hands of the counter-revolutionary bourgeoisie. In keeping with Lenin's recommendations, it temporarily withdrew the slogan "All Power to the Soviets", because just then the Soviets, led by the Mensheviks and S.R.s, were an appendage to the counter-revolutionary Provisional Government. This withdrawal did not imply renunciation of the Soviets as the political form of proletarian dictatorship. The congress advanced the slogan of fighting for the complete abolition of the dictatorship of the counter-revolutionary bourgeoisie and for the proletariat winning power in alliance with the peasant poor, through an armed uprising.

The congress rejected the proposals put forward by Preohrazhensky, who contended that the socialist revolution could not win in Russia and that Russia could not take the socialist road unless a proletarian revolution was accomplished in the West. The congress also rebuffed Bukharin, who opposed the Party's course for the socialist revolution, saying that the peasants formed a bloc with the bourgeoisie and would refuse to follow the working class.

The congress decisions laid special emphasis on Lenin's thesis of the alliance of the proletariat and the peasant poor as the paramount condition for the victory of the socialist revolution. "It is only the revolutionary proletariat," said the resolution "The Political Situation", "that can accomplish this task—a task set by the new upswing-provided it is supported by the peasant poor"

The question whether Lenin should appear in court was one of the first items discussed by the congress. Stalin, who touched on it in replying to the debate on the Central Committee's political activity, declared in favour of Lenin appearing in court, on the understanding that Lenin's personal safety would be guaranteed and the trial conducted on democratic lines. Stalin moved a resolution to that effect.

It is not clear at the moment," he said, "who is in power. There is no guarantee that if they [Lenin and Zinoviev] are arrested they will not be subjected to brute force. Things will be different if the trial is held on democratic lines and it is guaranteed that they will not be torn to pieces. When we asked the Central Executive Committee about this, they replied: 'We do not know what may happen.' So long as the situation is not clear and a covert struggle is going on between the nominal and the real authority, there is no point in the comrades appearing before the authorities. If, however, power is wielded by an authority which can safeguard our comrades against violence and is fair-dealing at least to some extent ... they shall appear.

V. Volodarsky, I. Bezrabotny (D. Z. Manuilsky) and M. Lashevich spoke in favour of Lenin appearing in court (provided his safety was guaranteed, the trial was public and representatives of the Central Executive Committee of the Soviets attended it), and moved a resolution in that sense.

Grigory Ordzhonikidze countered Stalin's position that a bourgeious court could give fair trial to a revolutionary leader of the working class. He stressed that Lenin must under no circumstances be delivered into the hands of the investigators. Felix Dzerzhinsky, Mykola Skrypnik and others spoke against Lenin appearing in court. "We must say clearly and explicitly," said Dzerzhinsky, "that those comrades who advised Lenin not to allow himself to be arrested did well. We must make clear to all comrades that we do not trust the Provisional Government and the bourgeoisie and will not deliver Lenin until justice triumphs, that is, until that disgraceful trial is called off."

After much debate, the Sixth Party Congress unanimously passed a resolution against Lenin appearing in court, expressed its "emphatic protest against the outrageous persecution of revolutionary proletarian leaders by the public prosecutor, spies and police", and sent Lenin a message of greeting.

Yakov Sverdlov reported on the Central Committee's organising activity. He pointed out that in the three months that had passed since the Seventh (April) All-Russia Conference the Party membership had trebled, increasing from 80,000 to 240,000, and the number of Party organisations had grown from 78 to 162. The congress heard nineteen reports from local organisations. The speakers stressed the vast amount of work being carried on by local organisations and the steadily growing influence of the Bolsheviks among the working people.

The congress discussed and approved the Party's economic platform, which envisaged nationalisation and centralisation of the banks, nationalisation of large-scale industry, confiscation of the landed estates and nationalisation of all the lands in the country, establishment of workers' control over production and distribution, organisation of proper exchange between town and country, and other revolutionary measures.

The congress adopted the new Party Rules. The first clause of the Rules, dealing with membership, was supplemented with the stipulation that Party members should submit to all Party decisions. The new provision was introduced that persons seeking admission should present recommendations from two Party members and that their admission should be subject to approval by the general meeting of the organisation concerned. The Rules stressed that all Party organisations should be based on the principles of democratic centralism. Party congresses were to be convened once a year and plenary meetings of the Central Committee, not less than once in two months.

The congress reaffirmed the decision of the Seventh Conference of the RSDLP(b) on the need to revise the Party Programme in the sense indicated by the conference. It found it necessary to call a congress before long for the express purpose of adopting a new Programme, and instructed the Central Committee and all Party organisations to begin discussing a revision of the Party Programme, preparatory to the congress.

The congress resolution "Youth Leagues" said it was a pressing task to contribute to the formation of socialist class organisations of young workers, and obliged Party organisations to devote the greatest attention to this task. In discussing the item "The Trade Union Movement", the congress criticised the theory of trade union neutrality and pointed out that the trade unions had a vital interest in carrying the revolution through to a victorious end and that they could accomplish the tasks facing Russia's working class provided they remained militant class organisations recognising the political leadership of the Bolshevik Party.

The congress made all its decisions subordinate to the chief objective, which was to train the working class and the peasant poor for an armed uprising to bring about the victory of the socialist revolution. In a manifesto addressed to all working people, all workers, soldiers and peasants of Russia, it called on them to gather strength and prepare, under the banners of the Bolshevik Party, for the decisive battle with the bourgeoisie.

Among those the congress elected to the Central Committee were V. I. Lenin, Y. A. Berzin, A. S. Bubnov, F. E. Dzerzhinsky, A. M. Kollontai, V. P. Milyutin, M. K. Muranov, V. P. Nogin, F. A. Sergeyev (Artyom), S. G. Shahumyan, J. V. Stalin, Y. M. Sverdlov and M. S. Uritsky.

At the congress the Inter-District Organisation of United Social-Democrats, a Menshevik dissident group to which Leon Trotsky belonged, joined the party. At the time of the merger the Inter-District Organisation of United Social-Democrats had 4000 members across Russia.

=== Dual power and debates of political action ===
The repression against the Bolsheviks ceased when the Kerensky government was threatened by a rebellion led by General Kornilov, and offered arms to those who would defend St. Petersburg against Kornilov. The Bolsheviks enlisted a 25,000 strong militia to defend St. Petersburg from attack, and reached out to Kornilov's troops, urging them not to attack. The troops stood down and the rebellion fizzled. Kornilov was taken into custody. However, the Bolsheviks did not return their arms, and Kerensky succeeded only in strengthening the Bolshevik position.

During this period, the situation of dual power endured. While the legislature and provisional government were controlled by Kerensky in coalition with the Mensheviks and the Socialist Revolutionary Party, the workers' and soldiers' soviets were increasingly under the control of the Bolsheviks, who now had what amounted to their own private army. Factories, mills and military units held new elections and sent to the Soviets representatives of the RSDLP(b) in place of Mensheviks and Socialist-Revolutionaries. On August 31, the day following the victory over Kornilov, the Petrograd Soviet endorsed the Bolshevik policy. The old Menshevik and Socialist-Revolutionary Presidium of the Petrograd Soviet, headed by Nikolay Chkheidze, resigned, thus clearing the way for the Bolsheviks. On September 5, the Moscow Soviet of Workers' Deputies went over to the Bolsheviks. The Socialist-Revolutionary and Menshevik Presidium of the Moscow Soviet also resigned and left the way clear for the Bolsheviks. Encouraged by the expansion of the influence within the Soviets the party, through its representatives with the Soviets, was able to call for a Second All-Russian Congress of Soviets in the second half of October 1917.

=== Insurrection vs. Parliamentarism ===
The RSDLP(b) Central Committee spent September and October 1917 debating whether they should use parliamentary methods or whether they should seize power by force. With Lenin in hiding in Finland, the parliamentary line– advocated by Kamenev, Grigory Zinoviev and Rykov against Joseph Stalin and Leon Trotsky– at first prevailed. The Bolsheviks participated in the quasiparliamentary bodies convened by the Provisional Government, the All-Russian Democratic Conference and the smaller, more permanent Pre-Parliament.

Lenin sent numerous letters to the Central Committee and to St. Petersburg party activists urging them to abandon the parliamentary path and overthrow the Provisional Government by means of an insurrection. In his articles and letters Lenin outlined a detailed plan for the uprising showing how the army units, the navy and the Red Guards would be used, what key positions in Petrograd would be seized in order to ensure the success of the uprising, and so forth.

On October 7, Lenin secretly arrived in Petrograd from Finland. On the same day the balance of power within the Central Committee shifted in favor of the insurrection in early October, resulting in the party delegation withdrawing from the Pre-Parliament.

On October 10 the meeting of the Central Committee of the Party took place at which it was decided to launch the armed uprising within the next few days. The resolution of the Central Committee of the Party, drafted by Lenin, stated:

The Central Committee recognizes that the international position of the Russian revolution (the revolt in the German navy which is an extreme manifestation of the growth throughout Europe of the world Socialist revolution; the threat of conclusion of peace by the imperialists with the object of strangling the revolution in Russia) as well as its military position (the indubitable decision of the Russian bourgeoisie and Kerensky and Co. to surrender Petrograd to the Germans), and the fact that the proletarian party has gained a majority in the Soviets– all this, taken in conjunction with the peasant revolt and the swing of popular confidence towards our Party (the elections in Moscow), and, finally, the obvious preparations being made for a second Kornilov affair (the withdrawal of troops from Petrograd, the dispatch of Cossacks to Petrograd, the surrounding of Minsk by Cossacks, etc.)– all this places the armed uprising on the order of the day. Considering therefore that an armed uprising is inevitable, and that the time for it is fully ripe, the Central Committee instructs all Party organizations to be guided accordingly, and to discuss and decide all practical questions (the Congress of Soviets of the Northern Region, the withdrawal of troops from Petrograd, the action of our people in Moscow and Minsk, etc.) from this point of view.

— Lenin, Selected Works, Vol. VI, p. 303.

Two members of the Central Committee, Zinoviev and Kamenev, spoke and voted against this decision. Although at this meeting Trotsky did not vote against the resolution directly, he moved an amendment proposing that the uprising should not be started before the Second Congress of Soviets met.

=== Preparing for the insurrection ===
The Central Committee of the party sent its representatives to the Donetz Basin, the Urals, Helsingfors, Kronstadt, the South-Western Front and other places to organize the uprising. Kliment Voroshilov, Vyacheslav Molotov, Feliks Dzerzhinsky, Sergo Ordjonikidze, Sergei Kirov, Lazar Kaganovich, Valerian Kuibyshev, Mikhail Frunze, Yemelyan Yaroslavsky and others were specially assigned by the party to direct the uprising in the provinces. Andrei Zhdanov carried on the work among the armed forces in Shadrinsk, in the Urals. Nikolai Yezhov made preparations for an uprising of the soldiers on the Western Front, in Byelorussia. The representatives of the Central Committee acquainted the leading members of the Bolshevik organizations in the provinces with the plan of the uprising and mobilized them in readiness to support the uprising in Petrograd.

On the instructions of the Central Committee of the Party, a Revolutionary Military Committee of the Petrograd Soviet was set up. This body became the legally functioning headquarters of the uprising.

On October 16 an enlarged meeting of the Central Committee of the Party was held. This meeting elected a Party Centre, headed by Stalin, to direct the uprising. This Party Centre was the leading core of the Revolutionary Military Committee of the Petrograd Soviet and had practical direction of the whole uprising.

At the meeting of the Central Committee Zinoviev and Kamenev again opposed the uprising. Meeting with a rebuff, they came out openly in the press against the uprising, against the Party. On October 18 the Menshevik newspaper, Novaya Zhizn, printed a statement by Kamenev and Zinoviev declaring that the Bolsheviks were making preparations for an uprising, and that they (Kamenev and Zinoviev) considered it an adventurous gamble. Lenin wrote in this connection: "Kamenev and Zinoviev have betrayed the decision of the Central Committee of their Party on the armed uprising to Rodzyanko and Kerensky." Lenin put before the Central Committee the question of Zinoviev's and Kamenev's expulsion from the party for breaching party discipline, having disclosed the secret plans for an armed insurrection.

On October 21 the party sent commissars of the Revolutionary Military Committee to all revolutionary army units. Throughout the remaining days before the uprising energetic preparations for action were made in the army units and in the mills and factories. Precise instructions were also issued to the warships Aurora and Zarya Svobody. Wary of a preemptive counterattack of the Kerensky government, the Central Committee of the party decided to initiate the uprising before the appointed time, and set its date for the day before the opening of the Second Congress of Soviets.

=== Onset ===
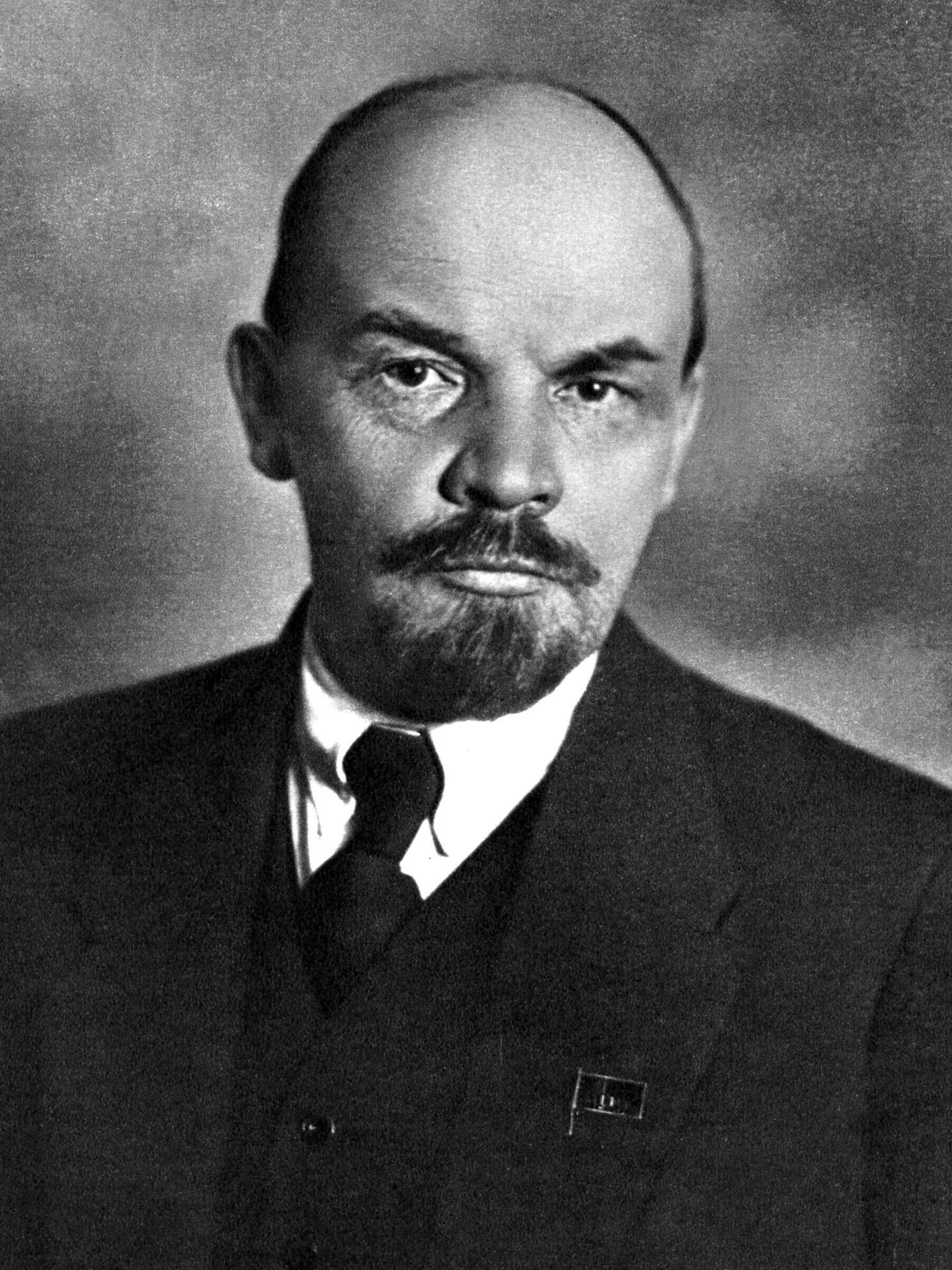
Vladimir Lenin, founder of the Soviet Union and the leader of the Bolshevik party.

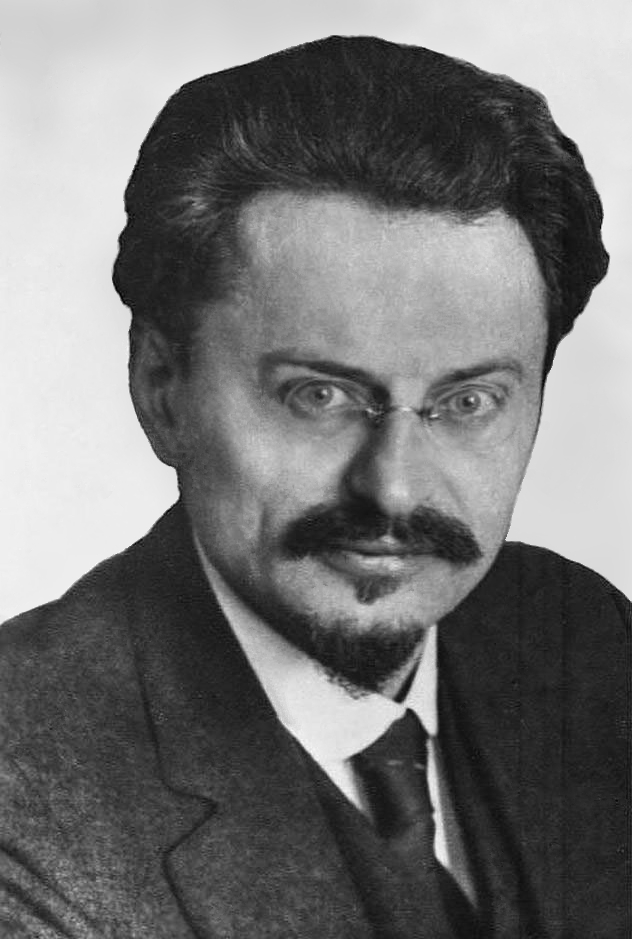
Leon Trotsky, founder of the Red Army and a key figure in the October Revolution.

Kerensky began his attack on the early morning of October 24 (November 6) by ordering the suppression of the central organ of the party, Rabochy Put (Workers' Path), and the dispatch of armoured cars to its editorial premises and to the printing plant of the Bolsheviks. By 10 am, however, on the instructions of Stalin, Red Guards and revolutionary soldiers pressed back the armoured cars and placed a reinforced guard over the printing plant and the Rabochy Put editorial offices. Towards 11 am Rabochy Put came out with a call for the overthrow of the Provisional Government. Simultaneously, on the instructions of the Party Centre of the uprising, detachments of revolutionary soldiers and Red Guards were rushed to the Bolshevik headquarters in the Smolny Institute. Thus the uprising had begun.

On the night of October 24 Lenin arrived at the Smolny Institute and assumed personal direction of the uprising. During that night revolutionary units of the army and detachments of the Red Guard kept arriving at the Smolny. The Bolsheviks directed them to the centre of the capital, to surround the Winter Palace, where the Provisional Government had entrenched itself.

On October 25 (November 7), Red Guards and revolutionary troops occupied the railway stations, post office, telegraph office, the Ministries and the State Bank. The Pre-parliament was declared dissolved. The Smolny, the headquarters of the Petrograd Soviet and of the Bolshevik Central Committee, became the headquarters of the revolution, from which fighting orders emanated. The uprising also included the navy forces. The cruise ship Aurora turned its guns on the Winter Palace.

On October 25 (November 7) the Bolsheviks issued a manifesto 'To the Citizens of Russia' announcing that the Provisional Government had been deposed and that state power had passed into the hands of the Soviets. The Provisional Government had taken refuge in the Winter Palace under the protection of cadets and shock battalions. On the night of October 25 the Bolsheviks took the Winter Palace by storm and arrested the Provisional Government. At this point Petrograd was under the authority of the Bolshevik Party.

=== Second Congress of Soviets ===
The Second All-Russian Congress of Soviets opened in the Smolny at 10:45 pm on October 25 (November 7), 1917, when the uprising in Petrograd was already in motion and the power in the capital had de facto passed into the hands of the Petrograd Soviet. The Bolsheviks secured an overwhelming majority at the congress. The Mensheviks, Bundists and Right Socialist-Revolutionaries left the congress, announcing that they refused to take any part in its labours. In a statement which was read at the Congress of Soviets they referred to the ongoing uprising as a 'military plot'. The congress then condemned the position of the Mensheviks and Socialist-Revolutionaries. The congress proclaimed that all power had passed to the Soviets:

On the night of October 26 (November 8) the Second Congress of Soviets adopted the Decree on Peace. The congress called upon the belligerent countries to conclude an immediate armistice for a period of not less than three months to permit negotiations for peace to put an end to the ongoing World War.

While addressing itself to the governments and peoples of all the belligerent countries, the congress at the same time appealed to 'the class-conscious workers of the three most advanced nations of mankind and the largest states participating in the present war, namely, Great Britain, France and Germany.' It called upon these workers to help 'to bring to a successful conclusion the cause of peace, and at the same time the cause of the emancipation of the toiling and exploited masses of the population from all forms of slavery and all forms of exploitation.'

That same night the Second Congress of Soviets adopted the Decree on Land, which proclaimed that 'Landed proprietorship is abolished forthwith without compensation.' The basis adopted for this agrarian law was a Mandate (Nakaz) of the peasantry, compiled from 242 mandates of peasants of various localities. In accordance with this Mandate private ownership of land was to be abolished forever and replaced by public, or state ownership of the land. The lands of the landlords, of the tsar's family and of the monasteries were to be turned over to all the toilers. By this decree the peasantry received over 400,000,000 acres (1,600,000 km^{2}) of land that had formerly belonged to the landlords, the bourgeoisie, the tsar's family, the monasteries and the churches. Moreover, the peasants were released from paying rent to the landlords, which had amounted to about 500,000,000 gold rubles annually.

All mineral resources (oil, coal, ores, etc.), forests and waters were declared to be the property of the people.

Lastly, Congress established a new government called the Council of People's Commissars (Sovnarkom). Lenin became the Chairman of the new government, literally Premier, Trotsky became the first People's Commissar for Foreign Affairs and other Bolshevik leaders took over other government ministries, which were known as "commissariats" until 1946.

=== Spread of the revolution ===
Soon the news of the uprising in Petrograd reached the other parts of the empire. For several days in Moscow the street were the scenes of street battles between Bolsheviks and opponents of the revolution.

=== Attempts of counter-revolution ===
The now deposed Kerensky attempted to retake Petrograd. On November 10, 1917, Kerensky, who during the uprising had fled from Petrograd to the Northern Front, mustered several Cossack units and dispatched them against Petrograd under the command of General Pyotr Krasnov. On November 11, 1917, an organization calling itself the Committee for the Salvation of the Fatherland and the Revolution headed by Socialist-Revolutionaries, raised a mutiny of cadets in Petrograd. But the mutiny was suppressed by sailors and Red Guards without in evening of the same day, and on November 13 General Krasnov was routed near the Pulkovskiye Heights. Lenin personally directed the suppression of the anti-Soviet mutiny.

In Moghilev, at the General Headquarters of the Army, General Nikolay Dukhonin, the Commander-in-Chief, also attempted a mutiny. When the Soviet Government instructed him to start immediate negotiations for an armistice with the German Command, he refused to obey. Thereupon Dukhonin was dismissed by order of the Soviet Government. The General Headquarters was broken up and Dukhonin himself was killed by the soldiers, who had risen against him.

=== Debates of the line of the party ===
One sector of the party leadership, Kamenev, Zinoviev, Rykov, Shlyapnikov and others, differed with Lenin over the political line of the party. They called for the formation of an 'all-Socialist government', which to include Mensheviks and Socialist-Revolutionaries. On November 15, 1917, the Central Committee of the Bolshevik Party adopted a resolution rejecting agreement with these parties, and proclaiming 'Kamenev and Zinoviev' strikebreakers of the revolution. On November 17, Kamenev, Zinoviev, Rykov and Milyutin, disagreeing with the policy of the Party, announced their resignation from the Central Committee.

That same day, November 17, Nogin, in his own name and in the names of Rykov, V. Milyutin, Teodorovich, A. Shlyapnikov, D. Ryazanov, Yurenev and Larin, members of the Council of People's Commissars, announced their disagreement with the policy of the Central Committee of the Party and their resignation from the Council of People's Commissars. The Central Committee of the party branded them as 'deserters' from the revolution and 'accomplices of the bourgeoisie'.

=== Relation to the Left Socialist-Revolutionaries ===
The Left Socialist-Revolutionaries, who had a significant influence in the countryside, initially sided with the Bolsheviks. The Congress of Peasant Soviets which took place in November 1917 endorsed the Soviet Government. An agreement was reached between the RSDLP(b) and the Left Socialist-Revolutionaries and several of the Left SR leaders were given posts in the Council of People's Commissars (Kolegayev, Spiridonova, Proshyan and Steinberg). However, this agreement lasted only until the signing of the Peace of Brest-Litovsk and the formation of the Poor Peasants Committees, when a deep cleavage took place among the peasantry. At this point the Left SRs sided with the more affluent peasants and initiated a revolt against Soviet power. The revolt was suppressed by the Soviet Government.

=== Brest-Litovsk peace ===
However, Russia was still at war with the Central Powers of Germany and Austria-Hungary. In the view of the Bolsheviks, the war had to be ended in order to consolidate Soviet power. The Russian Soviet Federative Socialist Republic called upon 'all the belligerent peoples and their governments to start immediate negotiations for a just, democratic peace'. But the former allies of Russia—the United Kingdom and France—refused to accept the proposal of the Soviet Government. In view of this refusal, the Soviet Government decided to start negotiations with Germany and Austria-Hungary. The negotiations began on December 3 in Brest-Litovsk. On December 5 an armistice was signed.

Large sectors of the Russian political spectrum, from the Mensheviks and Socialist-Revolutionaries to the Whiteguards, opposed the negotiation policy of the Soviet Government. Moreover, a sector within the party had their doubts about the line of negotiations. Trotsky on one hand and the 'Left Communists' (led by Bukharin, a grouping also including Radek and Pyatakov) argued that the war should have been continued.

On February 10, 1918, the peace negotiations in Brest-Litovsk were broken off. Although Lenin and Stalin had argued that peace be signed, Trotsky, who was chairman of the Soviet delegation at Brest-Litovsk, won the vote at the party's executive committee on 22 January 1918 and on 10 February 1918 promulgated his "no peace, no war" policy: the Soviet negotiators left the negotiations in the hope that pro-peace factions in the German Reichstag would ensure that Germany did not resume the conflict. Fighting resumed, and the German forces made rapid advances into Russian territory.

At this juncture the RSDLP(b) and the Soviet Government issued the call– 'The Socialist fatherland is in danger!', urging the working class to join the Red Army.

On February 18, 1918, the Central Committee of the party approved Lenin's proposal to send a telegram to the German government offering to conclude an immediate peace. However, the German offensive was maintained for a few days. The German government expressed its willingness to sign peace on February 22.

Within the party, the debates continued. Bukharin and Trotsky, Lenin declared, "actually helped the German imperialists and hindered the growth and development of the revolution in Germany". On February 23, the Central Committee decided to accept the terms of the German Command and to sign the peace treaty. Large territories, including Estonia, Latvia and Poland, were passed over to German control, and Ukraine was converted into a separate state under German dominance. Moreover, the Soviet Government undertook to pay an indemnity to the Germans.

The Moscow Regional Bureau of the party, of which the 'Left Communists' (Bukharin, Ossinsky, Yakovleva, Stukov and Mantsev) had temporarily seized control, passed a resolution of no-confidence in the Central Committee. The bureau declared that it considered 'a split in the Party in the very near future scarcely avoidable.' Moreover, the resolution declared that 'In the interests of the international revolution, we consider it expedient to consent to the possible loss of the Soviet power, which has now become purely formal.' Lenin branded this decision as 'strange and monstrous.'

Later official Soviet history stated that this move on behalf of Trotsky, Bukharin and their followers had been part of a conspiracy to break the Brest-Litovsk agreement and to overthrow Lenin.

=== 7th Party Congress ===
The debate on the peace question was a major issue at the 7th party congress, inaugurated on March 6, 1918. This was the first congress held after the party had taken power. It was attended by 46 delegates with vote and 58 delegates with voice but no vote, representing 145,000 Party members. Actually, the membership of the Party at that time was not less than 270,000. The discrepancy was because, owing to the urgency with which the congress met, a large number of the organizations were unable to send delegates in time; and the organizations in the territories then occupied by the Germans were unable to send delegates at all.

Reporting at this congress on the Brest-Litovsk Peace, Lenin said that '...the severe crisis which our Party is now experiencing, owing to the formation of a Left opposition within it, is one of the gravest crises the Russian revolution has experienced.'

The resolution submitted by Lenin on the subject of the Brest-Litovsk Peace was adopted by 30 votes against 12, with 4 abstentions. On the day following the adoption of this resolution, Lenin wrote an article entitled 'A Distressful Peace', in which he said:

Intolerably severe are the terms of peace. Nevertheless, history will claim its own. . . . Let us set to work to organize, organize and organize. Despite all trials, the future is ours.

— Lenin, Collected Works, Russ. ed., Vol. XXII, p. 288.

In its resolution, the congress declared that further military attacks on the Soviet Republic were inevitable, and that therefore the congress considered it the fundamental task of the Party to adopt the most resolute measures to organize the Red Army and to introduce universal military training.

Moreover, the congress decided to change the name of the party to Russian Communist Party (bolsheviks), in order to differentiate it from the Mensheviks and other remaining factions originating from the RSDLP.

At the congress a special commission, which included Lenin and Stalin, was elected to draw up a new Party program, Lenin's draft program having been accepted as a basis.

=== Invasion, Civil War and War Communism ===
The Soviet Republic soon found itself under military attack, both from a large number of foreign states as well as domestic opposition, the so-called Whites. In response to the military threats against the Soviet Republic the RCP(b) proclaimed the country an armed camp and placed its economic, cultural and political life on a war footing. The Soviet Government announced that 'the Socialist fatherland is in danger' and called mobilization into the Red Army. Lenin issued the slogan, 'All for the front!'. About half the membership of the party and of the Young Communist League went to the front. In the propaganda of the party it was a war for the fatherland, a war against the foreign invaders and against the revolts of the exploiting classes whom the revolution had overthrown. The Council of Workers' and Peasants' Defence, organized by Lenin, directed the work of supplying the front with reinforcements, food, clothing and arms.

At this juncture the Socialist-Revolutionaries, began assassinating leading party members. They killed Uritsky and Volodarsky, and had made an attempt on the life of Lenin. Following this, the 'Red terror' was unleashed upon them and throughout Russia the Socialist-Revolutionaries were crushed.

The party took active part in the military affairs, through the Political Commissars within the Red Army. The Political Commissats were responsible for political and ideological training with the army units.

Faced with a situation of extreme material hardships, the Soviet Government introduced the policies of War Communism. It took under its control the middle-sized and small industries, in addition to large-scale industry, so as to accumulate goods for the supply of the army and the agricultural population. It introduced a state monopoly of the grain trade, prohibited private trading in grain and established the surplus-appropriation system, under which all surplus produce in the hands of the peasants was to be registered and acquired by the state at fixed prices, so as to accumulate stores of grain for the provisioning of the army and the workers. Lastly, it introduced universal labour service for all classes. In the viewpoint of the party, the principle of 'He who does not work, neither shall he eat' was put into practice.

=== Defeat of Germany ===
The First World War ended with the defeat of Germany and the overthrow of the German government. The Soviet Government now annulled its commitment to the Brest-Litovsk agreement and initiated a military and political struggle to reclaim Estonia, Latvia, Byelorussia, Lithuania, Ukraine and Transcaucasia.

=== Foundation of the Third International ===
Ever since the break with the Second International, the Bolsheviks had argued for the creation of a new Third, Communist International. In the new situation in Europe, with Soviet rule established in Russia and revolutionary uprisings taking place in Germany, Austria and Hungary, and with the traditional Social Democracy divided in many countries, a constitutive congress of the Communist International was held in March 1919. The RCP(b) was one of the founding parties of the new international, and its headquarters were in Moscow.

=== 8th Party Congress ===
The Eighth Congress of RCP(b) was held in March 1919. It assembled in the midst war. The congress was attended by 301 delegates with vote, representing 313,766 members of the Party, and 102 delegates with voice but no vote. In his inaugural speech, Lenin paid homage to the memory of Y. M. Sverdlov, who had died on the eve of the congress.

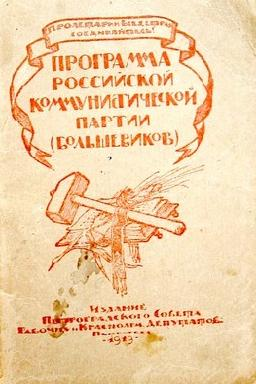
RCP(b) Party Programme, adopted at the 8th Party Congress

The congress adopted a new Party Program. This program included a description of capitalism and imperialism, and compared two systems of state– the bourgeois-democratic system and the Soviet system. It specified the specific tasks of the Party in the struggle for socialism: completion of the expropriation of the bourgeoisie; administration of the economic life of the country in accordance with a single socialist plan; participation of the trade unions in the organization of the national economy; socialist labour discipline; utilization of bourgeois experts in the economic field under the control of Soviet bodies; gradual and systematic enlistment of the middle peasantry in the work of socialist construction.

The congress adopted Lenin's proposal to include in the program in addition to a definition of imperialism as the highest stage of capitalism, the description of industrial capitalism and simple commodity production contained in the old program adopted at the Second Party Congress (of the RSDLP). Lenin considered it essential that the program should take account of the complexity of the economic system and note the existence of diverse economic formations in the country, including small commodity production, as represented by the middle peasants.

Bukharin, however, proposed that the clauses dealing with capitalism, small commodity production, the economy of the middle peasantry, should have been left out of the program.

Bukharin and Pyatakov differed with Lenin on the national question. Bukharin and Pyatakov argued against the inclusion in the program of a clause on the right of nations to self-determination; claiming that the slogan that would hinder the victory of the proletarian revolution and the union of the proletarians of different nationalities. Lenin refuted the standpoints of Bukharin and Pyatakov.

An important place in the deliberations of the Eighth Congress was devoted to policy towards the middle peasants. The Decree on the Land had resulted in a steady growth in the number of middle peasants, who now comprised the majority of the peasant population. In the analysis of the party, the attitude and conduct of the middle peasantry was of momentous importance for the fate of the Civil War and Socialist construction. The analysis stipulated that the outcome of the Civil War would largely depended on which way the middle peasantry would swing, which group would win its allegiance.

The new policy towards the middle peasant proclaimed by Lenin at the Eighth Congress required that the proletariat should rely on the poor peasant, maintain a stable alliance with the middle peasant and fight against the 'kulak' (rich peasant). The policy of the party before the Eighth Congress was in general one of neutralizing the middle peasant. This meant that the Party strove to prevent the middle peasant from siding with the kulak and with the bourgeoisie in general. But now this was not enough. The Eighth Congress passed from a policy of neutralization of the middle peasantry to a policy of stable alliance with them for the purpose of the struggle against the Whites and foreign intervention.

The problems connected with the building up of the Red Army held a special place in the deliberations of the congress, where the so-called 'Military Opposition' appeared in the field. This 'Military Opposition' comprised a number of former members of the now shattered group of 'Left Communists'; but it also included some party cadres who had never participated in any oppositional activity, but were dissatisfied with the way Trotsky was conducting the affairs of the army. The 'Military Opposition' was hostile to Trotsky on the grounds that he relied on military experts of the old tsarist army, enemies in the eyes of the 'Military Opposition'.

Lenin and Stalin condemned the 'Military Opposition', because it defended the survival of the guerrilla mode of operations and resisted the creation of a regular Red Army, the utilization of the military experts of the old army and the establishment of strict military discipline. In his response to the 'Military Opposition', Stalin said:

Either we create a real worker and peasant—primarily a peasant—army, strictly disciplined army, and defend the Republic, or we perish.

A Military Commission was set up at the congress. The motivation behind this decision was to strengthen the Red Army and to bring it still closer to the party.

The congress further discussed party and Soviet affairs and the guiding role of the party in the Soviets. During the debate on the latter question the congress repudiated the view of the Sapronov-Ossinsky group which held that the Party should not guide the work of the Soviets.

Lastly, in view of the huge influx of new members into the Party, the congress outlined measures to improve the social composition of the party and decided to conduct a re-registration of its members. This initiated the first purge of the Party ranks.

On March 25, 1919, the Central Committee elected by the 8th congress appointed a Politburo consisting of Kamenev, N. Krestinsky, Lenin, Stalin and Trotsky, and with Bukharin, Zinovyev and Kalinin as candidate members.

=== 9th Party Congress ===
The 9th Party Congress met at the end of March 1920. It was attended by 554 delegates with vote, representing 611,978 Party members, and 162 delegates with voice but no vote. The congress defined the immediate tasks of the country in the sphere of transportation and industry. It particularly stressed the necessity of the trade unions taking part in the building up of the economic life.

Special attention was devoted by the congress to a single economic plan for the restoration, in the first place, of the railways, the fuel industry and the iron and steel industry. The major item in this plan was a project for the electrification of the country, which Lenin advanced as 'a great program for the next ten or twenty years'. This formed the basis of the plan of the State Commission for the Electrification of Russia (GOELRO).

The congress rejected the views of a group which called itself the Group of Democratic Centralism and was opposed to one-man management and the undivided responsibility of industrial directors. It advocated unrestricted 'group management' under which nobody would be personally responsible for the administration of industry. The chief figures in this group were Sapronov, Ossinsky and Y. Smirnov. They were supported at the congress by Rykov and Tomsky.

=== In Baku ===
On February 20, 1920, the local cell of the party in Baku merged with the Hummat Party, the Adalat Party and the Ahrar Party of Iran, forming the Communist Party of Azerbaijan.

=== Merger of the Party of Revolutionary Communism ===
In 1920, after the 2nd World Congress of the Comintern had decided that there should be only one communist party in every country, the Party of Revolutionary Communism dissolved itself, and its members joined the RCP(b).

== Tenth Party Congress ==
The party initially allowed free and open debate at party meetings, but this changed due to the Civil War. At the Tenth Party Congress of 1921, factions were banned in the party, including the Workers' Opposition, and in 1922 the Communist Party became the only legal political party.

In 1922 the Jewish Communist Party (Poalei Zion) (EKP) merged into the Yevsektsiya, the Jewish section of the party. This was one of two Poalei Zion (left zionists) groupings active in Russia at the time. The other, the Jewish Communist Labour Party (Poalei Zion), was prohibited in 1928.

== Stalin's rise to power ==
The authority of the party increased as a result, as did its control over the government and within the party the power of the Politburo grew. On Lenin's motion, Stalin was appointed General Secretary of the Communist Party in April 1922.

The next month Lenin suffered his first stroke and the question of who would be his successor became paramount as his health deteriorated. Lenin's role in government declined. He suffered a second stroke in December 1922 and the Politburo ordered that he be kept in isolation. His third stroke in March 1923 left him bedridden and unable to speak though he was still able to communicate through writing. Lenin finally died as the result of a fourth stroke in January 1924.

As a result of Lenin's illness, the position of general secretary became more important than had originally been envisioned and Stalin's power grew. Following Lenin's third stroke a troika made up of Stalin, Grigory Zinoviev and Lev Kamenev emerged to take day to day leadership of the party and the country and try to block Trotsky from taking power . Lenin, however, had become increasingly uneasy about Stalin and, following his December 1922 stroke dictated a letter to the party criticising him and urging his removal as general secretary. Stalin was aware of Lenin's Testament and acted to keep Lenin in isolation for health reasons and increase his control over the party apparatus.

Zinoviev and Bukharin became concerned about Stalin's increasing power and proposed that the Orgburo which Stalin, but no other members of the Politburo, be abolished and that Zinoviev and Trotsky be added to the party secretariat thus diminishing Stalin's role as general secretary. Stalin reacted furiously and the Orgburo was retained but Bukharin, Trotsky and Zinoviev were added to the body.

Due to growing political differences with Trotsky and his Left Opposition in the fall of 1923, the troika of Stalin, Zinoviev and Kamenev reunited. At the Twelfth Party Congress in 1923, Trotsky failed to use Lenin's Testament as a tool against Stalin for fear of endangering the stability of the party.

Lenin died in January 1924 and in May his Testament was read aloud at the Central Committee but Zinoviev and Kamenev argued that Lenin's objections had proven groundless and that Stalin should remain General Secretary. The Central Committee decided not to publish the testament.

Meanwhile, the campaign against Trotsky intensified and he was removed from the position of People's Commissar of War before the end of the year. In 1925, Trotsky was denounced for his essay Lessons of October which criticised Zinoviev and Kamenev for initially opposing Lenin's plans for an insurrection in 1917. Trotsky was also denounced for his theory of permanent revolution which contradicted Stalin's position that socialism could be built in one country, Russia, without a worldwide revolution. As the prospects for a revolution in Europe, particularly Germany, became increasingly dim through the 1920s, Trotsky's theoretical position began to look increasingly pessimistic as far as the success of Russian socialism was concerned.

With the resignation of Trotsky as War Commissar the unity of the troika began to unravel. Zinoviev and Kamenev again began to fear Stalin's power and felt that their positions were threatened. Stalin moved to form an alliance with Bukharin and his allies on the right of the party who supported the New Economic Policy and encouraged a slowdown in industrialisation efforts and a move towards encouraging the peasants to increase production via market incentives. Zinoviev and Kamenev denounced this policy as a return to capitalism. The conflict erupted at the Fourteenth Party Congress held in December 1925 with Zinoviev and Kamenev now protesting against the dictatorial policies of Stalin and trying to revive the issue of Lenin's Testament which they had previously buried. Stalin now used Trotsky's previous criticisms of Zinoviev and Kamenev to defeat and demote them and bring in allies like Molotov, Voroshilov and Mikhail Kalinin. Trotsky was dropped from the politburo entirely in 1926. The Fourteenth Congress also saw the first developments of the Stalin personality cult with Stalin being referred to as "leader" for the first time and becoming the subject of effusive praise from delegates.

Trotsky, Zinoviev and Kamenev formed a United Opposition against the policies of Stalin and Bukharin but they had lost influence as a result of the party struggles and no longer posed a serious threat to Stalin. In October 1927 Trotsky and Zinoviev were expelled from the Central Committee and at the Fifteenth Party Congress held in December 1927 the remaining members of the left opposition were subjected to insults and humiliations and in 1928 Trotsky and the Left Opposition were expelled from the Communist Party itself.

Stalin now moved against Bukharin by appropriating Trotsky's criticisms of his right wing policies. Stalin now promoted a new general line favouring collectivization of the peasantry and rapid industrialization of industry forcing Bukharin and his supporters into a Right Opposition.

At the Central Committee meeting held in July 1928, Bukharin and his supporters argued that Stalin's new policies would cause a breach with the peasantry. Bukharin also alluded to Lenin's Testament. While Bukharin had support from the party organization in Moscow and the leadership of several commissariats Stalin's control of the secretariat was decisive in that it allowed Stalin to manipulate elections to party posts throughout the country giving him control over a large section of the Central Committee. The right opposition was defeated, Bukharin attempted to form an alliance with Kamenev and Zinoviev but it was too late.

== Purge of the Old Bolsheviks ==
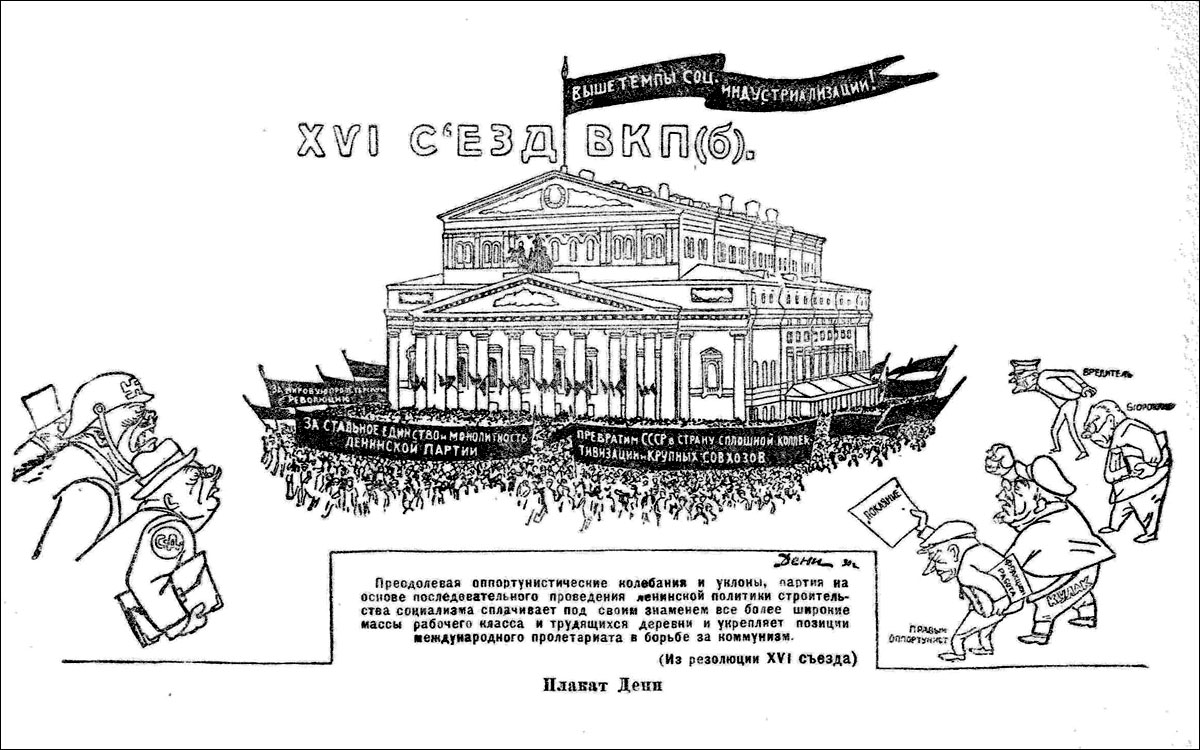
16th Congress poster

In the 1930s other senior Communists, many of whom had been Stalin's allies were removed and many of them were executed or died in mysterious circumstances, including Lev Kamenev, Grigory Zinoviev, Alexei Rykov and Nikolai Bukharin. Joseph Stalin instigated a series of purges against senior members of the party, culminating in the Great Purge of 1935 to 1938, with the key processes known as Moscow Trials.

There are theories that purges were initiated as a tool in Stalin's struggle for power. At the 17th Congress of the All-Union Communist Party (b) (February 1934) Sergei Kirov only received three negative votes in the election to the Politburo showing himself to be the most popular Soviet leader while Stalin received 267 negative votes ranking him the least popular. According to Molotov's memoirs as well as other reports, a number of party members at the Congress had approached Kirov with the proposal that he run for the position of General Secretary against Stalin.

Whether or not Stalin initiated the Purge as a response to opposition to him within the party and whether or not Stalin was personally behind the assassination of Kirov in December 1934 in order to remove a rival, that was used as a pretext for the Purge, the fact remains that of the 1,966 delegates who attended the 1934 "Congress of Victors", 1,108 were ultimately arrested by the secret police. Of 139 members of the Central Committee, 98 were arrested.

Ostensibly, the purge began as an investigation into Kirov's murder. Zinoviev and his former supporters were charged with the murder and subjected to show trials before being executed. The "investigation" continued and soon found thousands of alleged conspirators who were similarly rounded up and shot or put into labor camps. Stalin claimed that Kirov's assassin, Leonid Nikolaev, was part of a larger conspiracy led by Zinoviev, Kamenev and ultimately Leon Trotsky against the Soviet government.

Additional triggers for the purge may have been the refusal by the Politburo in 1932 to approve the execution of M. N. Riutin, an Old Bolshevik who had distributed a 200-page pamphlet calling for the removal of Stalin and their refusal in 1933 to approve the execution of A.P. Smirnov, who had been a party member since 1896 and had also been found to be agitating for Stalin's removal.

The failure of the Politburo to act ruthlessly against anti-Stalinists in the Party may have combined in Stalin's mind with Kirov's growing popularity to convince him of the need to move decisively against his opponents, real or perceived, and destroy them and their reputations as a means of consolidating Stalin and the bureaucracy's power over the party and the state.

The Moscow Trials lasted until 1938 and were used to blame various former oppositionists (as well as numerous supporters of Stalin who were considered suspect for some reason or another) with the failure of Stalin's Five Year Plan to meet its goals as well as other problems in the Soviet Union. Numerous Bolsheviks including Bukharin, Radek, Rykov and Rakovsky were accused of plotting to overthrow Stalin or even conspiring with Hitler against the USSR and were tried and executed.

The Great Purge saw the removal of 850,000 members from the Party, or 36% of its membership, between 1936 and 1938. Many of these individuals were executed or perished in prison camps. "Old Bolsheviks" who had been members of the Party in 1917 were especially targeted.

At the 18th Congress of the All-Union Communist Party (b) held in 1939, only 2% of the delegates had also been delegates to the last congress held in 1934.

== Stalinism ==
The labor camps were expanded into the infamous Gulag system under Stalin in his war against so-called "class enemies". Stalin also undertook massive resettlements of Kulaks, similarly to the Tsarist penal system of ssylka (resettlement in remote areas) which had been established to deal with political dissidents and common criminals without executing them.

As Stalin consolidated his rule the party itself ceased to be a serious deliberative body under Stalin with Party Congresses, particularly after the Great Purge, being little more than show pieces in which delegates would sing the praises of Stalin in what became a cult of personality. No party congresses were held at all between 1939 and 1952. The role of the secret police became paramount in Soviet society and within the party with party members closely monitored to ensure their adherence to Stalin. Similarly the Central Committee and even the Politburo became rubber stamps for Stalin's dictatorship and without any ability to challenge his power or question his decision.

At the 1952 party congress, Stalin had Molotov and Mikoyan removed from the Politburo and diluted the power of executive members by replacing the body with a twenty-five member Presidium (plus eleven candidates) that was twice the old Politburo's size. However, an informal Bureau of the Presidium, comparable to the old Politburo, was established in order to make decision-making more manageable. This bureau consisted of Stalin, Lavrentiy Beria, Georgy Malenkov, Nikita Khrushchev, Nikolai Bulganin, Kliment Voroshilov, Lazar Kaganovich, Maksim Saburov, and Mikhail Pervukhin, with future decision-making limited in practice to the first four or five of these.

== After Stalin ==
Stalin's death on March 5, 1953, unleashed a new struggle for succession to the leadership of the party and the country. Molotov had been widely thought to be Stalin's obvious successor but he had fallen into disfavour during Stalin's final years and had been removed from the Politburo in 1952 (though he was reinstated after Stalin's death). The struggle for succession became a contest between Lavrentiy Beria (the feared leader of the NKVD), Georgy Malenkov and Nikita Khrushchev.

At the meeting of the Presidium's inner bureau held immediately after Stalin's death, Beria proposed Malenkov as Chairman of the Council of Ministers (or Premier). The size of the Presidium was also cut in half in order to remove the influence of the new members that had been appointed in 1952 – the new Presidium had exactly the same membership as the old bureau of the Presidium except that Molotov and Mikoyan were reinstated. Malenkov also became First Secretary of the Party (as the position of General Secretary was now known) but had to relinquish that position and leave the party Secretariat on March 14, 1953, in the name of collective leadership due to the dissatisfaction of others in the leadership with Malenkov's assumption of both leadership roles.

Despite Beria's history as Stalin's most ruthless subordinates, he was at the forefront of destalinization and liberalisation after Stalin's death, possibly as a means of winning support for his campaign to become leader. Beria not only publicly denounced the Doctors' plot as a "fraud" but he instigated the release of hundreds of thousands of political prisoners from the gulags (prisoners he had had a hand in arresting in the first place), brought in a liberal policy towards non-Russian nationalities in the Soviet Union thus reversing decades of Russification and persuaded the Presidium and the Council of Ministers to urge the Socialist Unity Party regime of Walter Ulbricht in East Germany to slow down the "construction of socialism" and institute liberal economic and political reforms.

The surviving party leadership feared Beria and Khrushchev in particular saw him as his most serious rival. Khrushchev was unable to win conservatives in the Presidium such as Molotov to his side until one of Beria's initiatives, his German policy, resulted in calamity for Soviet power. At Beria's urging the East German government sent the public signals about an easing up in the regime thus raising expectations but when they equivocated on implementing changes such as cancelling a plan to increase labour production (and thus workload on individual workers) a mass protest movement resulted that threatened the existence of the government and resulted in a hard crackdown using Soviet Armed Forces troops (see Uprising of 1953 in East Germany).

The events in Germany convinced conservatives and supporters of Beria such as Molotov, Malenkov and Bulganin that his policies were dangerous and destabilising to Soviet power (his policy towards the nationalities was seen as a threat to the unity of the USSR itself). Days after the events in Germany, Khrushchev persuaded them to support an effective putsch against Beria. In June 1953, three months after Stalin's death, the members of the Presidium (the renamed Politburo) under the instigation of Khrushchev agreed to ambush Beria at a Presidium meeting surprising him by bringing in army officers to put him under arrest. He was tried and shot in December 1953 though Khrushchev was later to claim that he shot Beria himself at the June meeting of the Presidium.

With Beria, Malenkov's ally, out of the way, Khrushchev was in a position to outmanoeuver Malenkov for power. Khrushchev became First Secretary in September, 1953 ushering in a period in which Malenkov and Khrushchev shared power. Khrushchev won the support of Bulganin to move against Malenkov and at the Central Committee meeting in January 1955, Malenkov was criticized for his close relationship with Beria as well as his failure to implement promises to increase the production of consumer goods. The next month he was dismissed as head of the government.

The 20th Congress of the CPSU held in 1956 marked the party's formal break with Stalin (three years after his death) when First Secretary Nikita Khrushchev gave his famous Secret Speech denouncing the crimes and excesses of Stalin. This ushered in a period of destalinisation which saw an end to the personality cult which had grown around Stalin, the release of tens of thousands of political prisoners and a thaw in political and cultural discourse. This was too much for conservatives in the Presidium (the renamed Politburo). Malenkov, Kaganovich, Molotov and Bulganin attempted to oust Khrushchev in the summer of 1957 and won a vote in the Presidium to oust Khrushchev but Georgy Zhukov the defence minister and war hero, supported Khrushchev's demands that the matter be sent to the Central Committee which overturned the Presidium vote. Khrushchev ousted the so-called Anti-Party Group from the Presidium and ultimately from the party and, in 1958 became Premier while retaining the position of First Secretary.

The execution of Beria also brought the NKVD and its successor, the KGB under party control where, under Stalin, the state security apparatus had become more powerful than the party and the military. The reversal caused by Beria's arrest and execution brought an end to much of the arbitrary arrest and the system of forced labour in Gulags that had marked the Stalin era.

Khrushchev attempted to reorganize the party structure in 1962 along economic rather than geographical lines. This led to confusion and the alienation of many party officials.

Khrushchev's prestige was severely damaged as a result of the Cuban Missile Crisis which ended in what many in the party saw as a humiliating climbdown by Khrushchev. He was removed from power in October 1964 by the Central Committee due to the Cuban Missile Crisis as well as the failure of his agricultural and industrial policies. Destalinisation came to a halt under the new General Secretary, Leonid Brezhnev who emerged as the new party leader after first plotting with Nikolai Podgorny to oust Khrushchev and then outmanoeuvering Nikolai Podgorny to take the party leadership (Podgrony became the ceremonial head of state as a consolation until Brezhnev took that position for himself in 1977). However, there was no return to the policies of terror against party members. While internal party struggles would result in expulsions there were no executions of party members after the execution of Lavrentiy Beria in 1953. When Georgy Malenkov, Molotov, Kaganovich and other members of the so-called Anti-Party Group were expelled from the Presidium and ultimately from the party for allegedly plotting against Khrushchev they were not put on trial or imprisoned but simply demoted to minor posts (such as ambassador to Mongolia in the case of Molotov) or pensioned off as when Khrushchev himself was deposed in 1964.

Though initially, the USSR was again under a collective leadership, this time with Brezhnev as General Secretary, Podgorny as Chairman of the Presidium and Alexei Kosygin as Premier of the Soviet Union. Brezhnev was able to consolidate power to become the leading figure, but he was never able to gather as much powers as Stalin and Khrushchev had done previously. At the 23rd Congress of the CPSU held in 1966, Brezhnev was able to have himself declared General Secretary of the party, reviving a title that had not existed since Stalin. The Presidium also reverted to its previous name of Politburo. While Kosygin attempted to pursue a policy of favouring light industry and consumer good production over heavy industry (see Kosygin reform), Brezhnev favoured military expansion which necessitated a continued emphasis on heavy industry. While Kosygin remained Premier, it was Brezhnev's policies that won out and by 1968 he was the undisputed leader of both the party and the country. The Brezhnev period ushered in an unparalleled period of stability in the party, a stability that ultimately led to stagnation. Almost half of the members of the 1981 Central Committee had been on the body in 1966 while the average age of Politburo members rose from 55 in 1966 to 68 in 1982. The aging Soviet leadership led to its being described as a gerontocracy. Brezhnev suffered a stroke in 1975 but continued in power despite deteriorating health until his death in November 1982 at the age of 76. His final years were marked by an attempt to create a personality cult around himself as well as growing corruption within the party as members increasingly paid lip service to socialist ideas and instead saw their positions as a route to self enrichment.

== Gorbachev ==
Mikhail Gorbachev became the party's general secretary in 1985 following an interregnum after the death of Leonid Brezhnev in 1982 when the party was led first by Yuri Andropov and then by Konstantin Chernenko. When Brezhnev died Andropov was proclaimed General Secretary within days and by the official coverage in the Soviet media it was clear that he was the leader. Andropov died on February 9, 1984, and Chernenko was elected his replacement on February 13 but Chernenko was a compromise stopgap candidate as Gorbachev – Andropov's protege – lacked sufficient support in the Politburo. However, Chernenko was already an ill man and his duties were increasingly carried out by others, particularly Gorbachev, who was nominated by Andrei Gromyko to become General Secretary when Chernenko died. There are indications Gorbachev may have been in control prior to Chernenko's death as he was announced as the new General Secretary the day after Chernenko died on March 10, 1985.

Gorbachev instituted policies of glasnost, perestroika, and acceleration. Glasnost allowed freedom of speech in the Soviet Union and a flourishing of political debate within the Communist Party to a degree not seen since the Russian Revolution, perestroika was an attempt to restructure the political and particularly the economic organisation of the country, while acceleration meant faster development of the economy. This period of liberalisation ultimately ended in the dissolution of the Soviet bloc in Eastern Europe.

At the 27th Congress of the CPSU in 1986, Boris Yeltsin became a candidate member of the Politburo and offended party members in a speech that attacked the hidden privileges of the party elite.

On October 21, 1987, Boris Yeltsin delivered a historic speech at the CPSU Central Committee plenum, openly criticizing Mikhail Gorbachev for his inconsistent approach to perestroika. His remarks provoked a sharp backlash from members of the Politburo. Soon after, Yeltsin himself faced severe censure for his "excesses" and "administrative behavior". Following a serious heart attack, he was brought from the hospital to a meeting of the Moscow City Party Committee on November 11, where he was formally dismissed.

At the 1988 Party Conference Gorbachev launched reforms to reduce the party's control over the government including proposals for multicandidate elections to regional and local legislatures and the positions of local and regional party first secretaryships. While Gorbachev was able to receive approval for his reforms from the party, the membership of the CPSU was becoming increasingly resistant to Gorbachev's policies and rather than being a locus for change became a bulwark of conservatism. Increasingly, Gorbachev bypassed the party in order to implement his reforms relying instead on governmental bodies.

== End of Communist rule ==
In 1989 Gorbachev allowed other political associations (de facto political parties) to coexist with the Communist Party and in 1990 obtained the repeal of Article Six of the USSR constitution which gave the party supremacy over all institutions in society, thus ending its vanguard status. The Communist Party's power over the state formally ended that same year with the newly created post of President of the Soviet Union. Gorbachev was elected to this post, which allowed him to remain head of state. From this point onward, Gorbachev's real power came from the presidency, though he remained general secretary.

By the time of the 28th Congress of the CPSU in July 1990, the party was largely regarded as being unable to lead the country and had, in fifteen republics, split into opposing factions favouring either independent republics or the continuation of the Soviet Union. Stripped of its leading role in society, the party lost its authority to lead the nation or the cohesion that kept the party united.

The growing likelihood of the dissolution of the USSR itself led hardline elements in the CPSU to launch the August Coup in 1991 which temporarily removed Gorbachev from power. On August 19, 1991, a day before the New Union Treaty was to be signed devolving power to the republics, a group calling itself the "State Emergency Committee" seized power in Moscow declaring that Gorbachev was ill and therefore relieved of his position as president. Vice President Gennady Yanayev was named acting president. The committee's eight members included Yanayev, KGB chairman Vladimir Kryuchkov, Internal Affairs Minister Boris Pugo, Defense Minister Dmitriy Yazov and Prime Minister Valentin Pavlov. The coup failed because of large public demonstrations and the efforts of Boris Yeltsin, who became the real power in Russia as a result. Gorbachev returned to Moscow as president and vowed to purge the party of hardliners. The KGB was disbanded as were other CPSU-related agencies and organisations.

The coup destroyed the CPSU politically. By nearly all accounts, the coup proved that the party was beyond reform. For all intents and purposes, Communist rule in the Soviet Union ended on August 24. That day, Gorbachev dissolved the Central Committee, resigned as general secretary and ordered all party units in the government dissolved. Vladimir Ivashko was chosen as acting general secretary later that day. However, actual political power lay in the positions of President of the Soviet Union (held by Gorbachev) and President of the Russian SFSR (held by Yeltsin). Ivashko remained for five days as acting General Secretary until August 29, when the Supreme Soviet suspended all party activities on Soviet territory.

On November 6, Yeltsin issued a decree banning all CPSU activities on Russian territory and confiscating all party property in Russia. On November 30, 1992; the Russian Constitutional Court not only upheld this decree, but barred the CPSU from ever being refounded. It accepted Yeltsin's argument that the CPSU was not a true party, but a criminal organisation that had ruled the Soviet Union as a dictatorship in violation of the Soviet Constitution.

After the dissolution of the Soviet Union, Russian adherents to the CPSU tradition, particularly as it existed before Gorbachev, reorganised themselves as the Communist Party of the Russian Federation. Today there is a widespread flora of parties in Russia claiming to be the successors of CPSU. Several of them used the name CPSU. However, CPRF is generally seen (due to its massive size) as the inheritor of the CPSU in Russia. Besides CPRF was founded during the Gorbachev era, several years before CPSU was abolished and was seen as a "Russian-nationalist" counterpart to CPSU.

In other republics, communists established the Armenian Communist Party, Azerbaijan Communist Party, Party of Communists of Kyrgyzstan, Communist Party of Ukraine, Party of Communists of Belarus, Party of Communists of the Republic of Moldova, Communist Party of Kazakhstan and the Communist Party of Tajikistan. Along with the CPRF, these parties formed the Union of Communist Parties – Communist Party of the Soviet Union (SKP-KPSS). The Party of Communists of the Republic of Moldova currently holds 32 seats in the Parliament of Moldova as of the 2021 parliamentary election, while Party of Communists of Belarus currently holds 11 seats in the Belarusian House of Representatives as of the 2019 parliamentary election.

In Turkmenistan, the local party apparatus led by Saparmurat Niyazov was converted into the Democratic Party of Turkmenistan, which remains the ruling party of the country under Gurbanguly Berdimuhamedow.

In Uzbekistan, Uzbek First Secretary Islam Karimov converted the CPSU branch into the People's Democratic Party, which ruled the country until Karimov formed the Uzbekistan Liberal Democratic Party in 1996.

In Georgia, the Socialist Labour Party was founded in 1992. This party would later evolve into the Communist Party of Georgia (SKP). Another communist faction in Georgia, which is larger than SKP, is the United Communist Party of Georgia (SEKP).

In Estonia, the CPSU branch was in the hands of reformers, who converted it into the Estonian Democratic Labour Party (EDTP), which later merged into the Estonian United Left Party. A minority regrouped into the Communist Party of Estonia.

In Lithuania, the CPSU was officially banned in 1991. Branch of "progressive" communists led by Algirdas Brazauskas converted into the Democratic Labour Party of Lithuania, established in 1992. It later merged into the centre-left Social Democratic Party of Lithuania in 2001. In Latvia, communist organizations were officially banned and a major part of the party there had broken away in 1990 and formed the Latvian Social Democratic Party. The remnants of CPSU became the Union of Communists of Latvia, which went underground. Later communists regrouped into the Socialist Party of Latvia, which holds one seat in the Saeima after the 2018 parliamentary election.

== See also ==
- Bibliography of the Russian Revolution and Civil War
- Bibliography of Stalinism and the Soviet Union
- Bibliography of the Post Stalinist Soviet Union
