= Perm electoral district =

Constituency of the Russian Republic

Perm
- Former Civilian constituency for the All-Russian Constituent Assembly
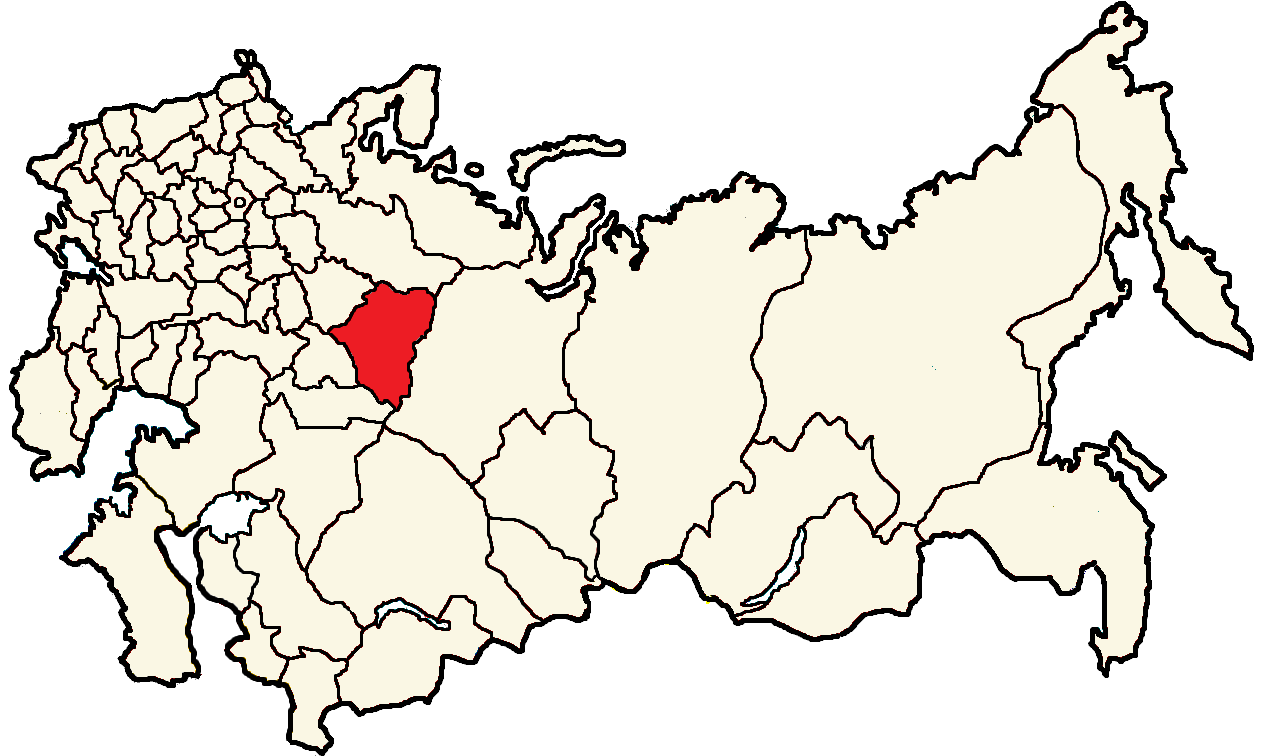

Former constituency
- Created: 1917
- Abolished: 1918
- Number of members: 18
- Number of Uyezd Electoral Commissions: 12
- Number of Urban Electoral Commissions: 2
- Number of Parishes: 518

The Perm electoral district (Russian: Пермский избирательный округ) was a constituency created for the 1917 Russian Constituent Assembly election. The electoral district covered the Perm Governorate.

The Peasants Union, with more than 13,000 votes, was mainly based in Krasnoufimsk uezd.

== Results ==
Perm
Party	Vote	%
List 2 - Socialist-Revolutionaries	665,118	52.05
List 6 - Bolsheviks	268,292	20.99
List 5 - Kadets	111,241	8.71
List 10 - [Orthodox] Clerical People's Party	47,881	3.75
List 9 - Muslims-Bashkirs	47,578	3.72
List 4 - Old Believers	35,853	2.81
List 3 - Muslims	29,683	2.32
List 11 - Bloc of Rightist SRs and Unity	29,112	2.28
List 7 - Mensheviks	28,002	2.19
List 1 - Krasnoufimsky Non-Partisan Credit Union	13,748	1.08
List 8 - Radical Democrats	1,381	0.11
Total:	1,277,889	

Deputies Elected
Alekseev	SR
Bondarev	SR
Gerstein	SR
Kabakov	SR
Kuznetsov	SR
Sigov	SR
Tarabukin	SR
Varushkin	SR
Zateeyshchikov	SR
Zdobnov	SR
Zisman	SR
Krol	Kadet
Sumarokov	Kadet
Andronnikov	Bolshevik
Beloborodov	Bolshevik
Krestinsky	Bolshevik
Sosnovsky	Bolshevik
Tukhvatullin	Bashkir-Tatar group
