= Komunisti =

Daily newspaper published by the Georgian Communist Party Central Committee

კომუნისტი Komunisti

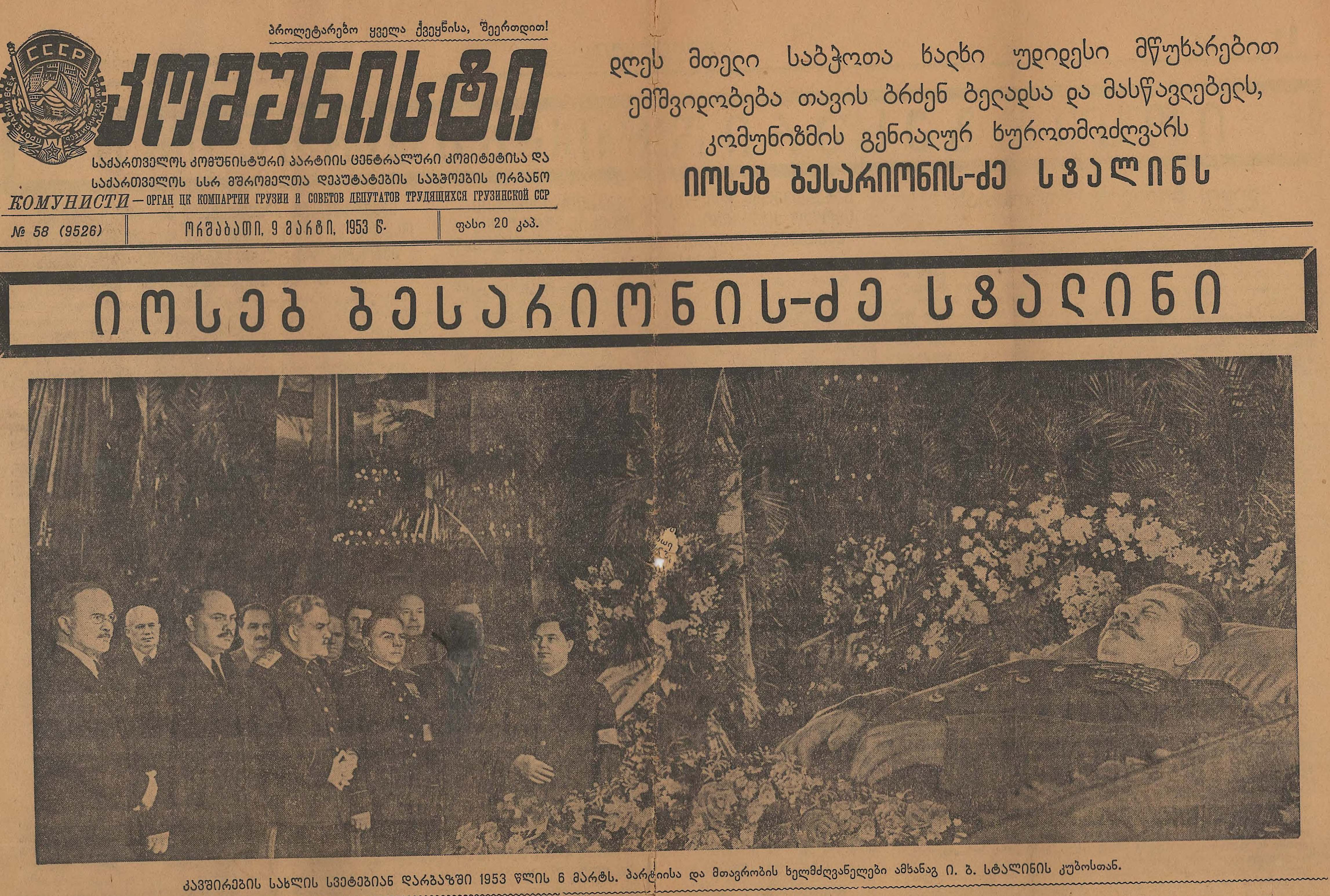
- The front page of Kommunisti on the death of Stalin.
- Type: Daily newspaper
- Format: Broadsheet
- Owner: Communist Party of Georgia
- Editor: N. Kiknadze (1923–1935); K. Sherozia (1937); F. Khatiashvili (1938–1944); B.Nanitashvili (1944-)
- Founded: 3 June 1920; 106 years ago (as Georgian Communist); 2 March 1921; 105 years ago (as Communist)
- Ceased publication: 1990, replaced by New Georgia newspaper
- Political alignment: Communism; Marxism–Leninism
- Language: Georgian
- Circulation: 700,000 (1980)

Komunisti (transl. Communist), (Georgian: კომუნისტი, romanized: k'omunist'i, Georgian pronunciation: [kʼomunistʼi]) was a daily newspaper published by the Georgian Communist Party Central Committee. The first number was issued on 3 June 1920 in Tbilisi as the daily organ of the Communist Party of Georgia and the Central Committee of the Communist Party, named "New Communist". After the publication of 10 numbers, the newspaper was closed down by the General-Governor of Tbilisi. During the first government of independent Georgia the newspaper was named "Georgia Communist". After the establishment of the Soviet government in Georgia on 2 March 1921, it was renamed Komunisti.

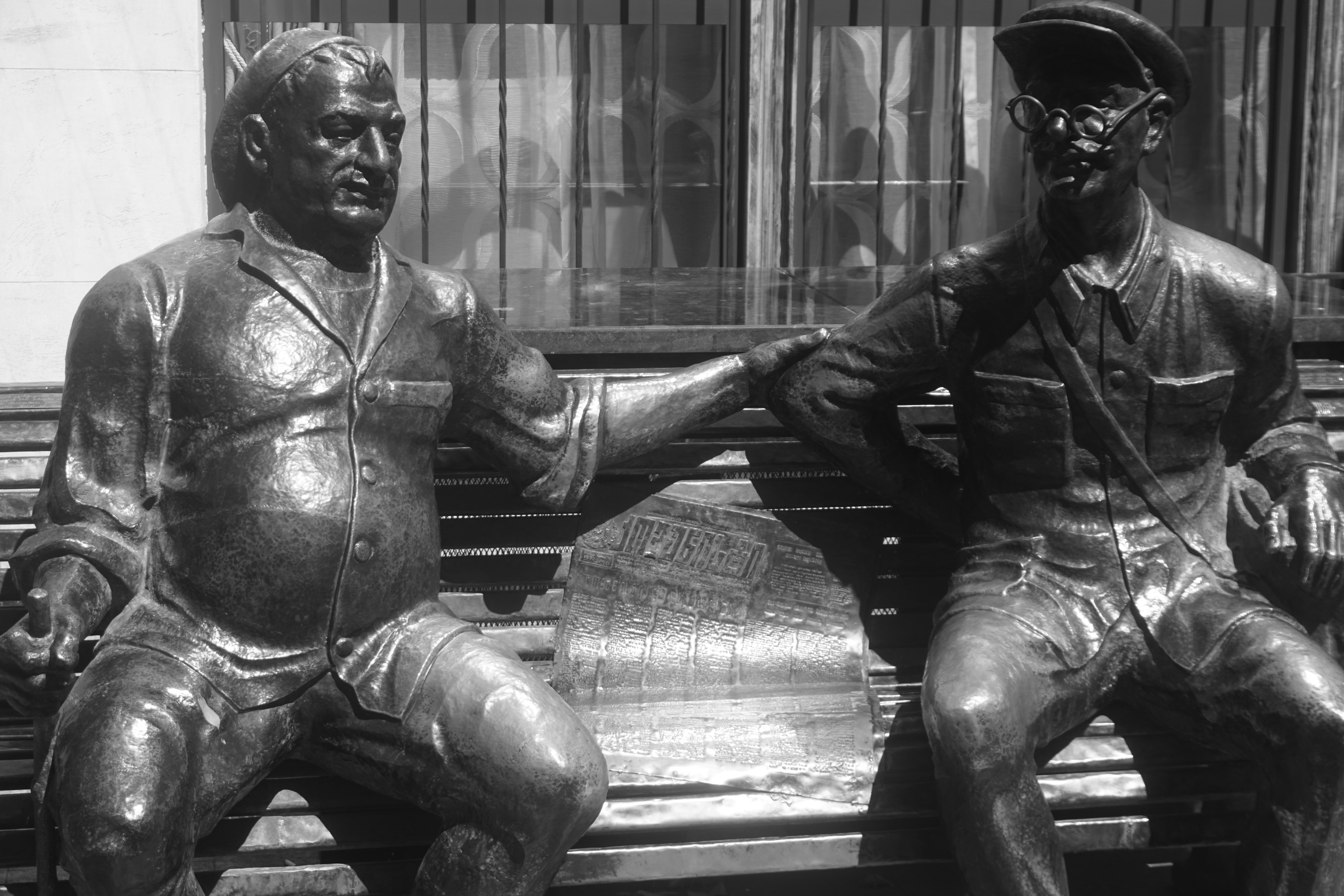
A Tbilisi street sculpture shows a copy of Komunisti on a bench between two men chatting

Komunisti reflected all the important periods of the history of the Georgian SSR, supporting the CPSU and the Government's decisions. The newspaper covered topics about policy, economics, industry, agriculture, literature, arts, education and other issues. The newspaper had its additions – journals Torch (1923–1925), Science and Technology (1925–1926), Flag (1929–1934), and Agriculture (1958).

Komunisti was awarded the Order of Red Banner of the 1950s. The newspaper ceased to exist after the dissolution of the USSR and the restoration of Georgian independence.
