= Luch (newspaper) =

Russian newspaper from 1912 to 1913

Luch (The Ray) was a Menshevik legal daily newspaper in Russia, published in St. Petersburg from 1912 to July 1913. In all, 237 issues were published. The newspaper survived mainly on the donations from liberals. Its policy was controlled by P. B. Axelrod, F. I. Dan, L. Martov and A. S. Martynov.
