= Lev Sosnovsky =

Soviet politician and journalist (1886–1937)

- Лев Семёнович Сосновский
- Born: Lev Semyonovich Sosnovsky; 1 January 1886; Orenburg, Russia
- Died: July 3, 1937 (aged 51)
- Cause of death: Execution by shooting
- Occupations: Revolutionary; publicist; journalist

Lev Semyonovich Sosnovsky (Russian: Лев Семёнович Сосновский) (1 January 1886 – 3 July 1937) was a Russian revolutionary, publicist and journalist. He was a prominent Trotskyist and member of the left opposition who was executed for his opposition to Joseph Stalin during the Great Purge.

== Early life ==
Lev Sosnovsky was born in Orenburg, the son of a retired soldier who had served in the army for 25 years during the reign of Tsar Nicholas I. During military service, his Jewish father, Semyon Sosnovsky, was beaten, and threatened with drowning unless he agreed to convert to the Russian Orthodox Church, which he refused to do. After leaving the army, he worked as a lawyer, despite being barely literate.

Lev Sosnovsky left school early to work in a chemist's shop in Samara, where he joined the Russian Social Democratic Labour Party as a teenager, in 1903. He joined the Bolshevik faction of the RSDLP after moving to Ekaterinburg in 1904. During the 1905 Revolution, he was sent to Zlatoust to recruit factory workers to the Bolsheviks. After the revolution was suppressed, he escaped to Odessa, and stowed away on a ship, disembarked in Algiers, and worked in a tobacco factory until he had the money to move to Paris. In 1906, he settled in Tashkent, where he worked as a typesetter, until he was dismissed for his political activities, and arrested. After his release, he moved to Baku, where he joined the local Bolshevik organisation and worked as a labourer in the oil fields, but was sacked. He moved to Moscow, where he started working as a journalist, writing for Bolshevik newspapers, but was arrested in winter 1909, and conscripted into the Imperial Army. After two years, he bribed an army doctor to certify that he was unfit for service, and moved to St Petersburg to work for Pravda and as an organiser of the Metal Workers Union. He was arrested twice during 1913, and banished to Chelyabinsk. He was arrested there at the outbreak of war, in 1914, and again in 1915. After his release, he returned to Ekaterinburg.

== Revolution and civil war ==
After the February Revolution of 1917, Sosnovsky was Assistant Chairman, and later Chairman of the Urals Regional Soviet, based in Yekaterinburg. In December, after the Bolshevik Revolution he moved to Petrograd/St Petersburg, and in 1918 followed the Soviet government when it transferred the capital to Moscow. He was sent back to Ekaterinburg after the Red Army had regain control of the city from the White Russian army of Admiral Kolchak, and was dispatched to Kharkiv for three months in 1919–20 after the rout of General Denikin, but otherwise he worked full time as a journalist. In spring 1918, he founded the newspaper Bednota (The Poor), which he edited until 1924.

== The Dymovka affair ==
During 1924, Sosnovsky was involved in recruiting village correspondents (selkors), who were mostly communist party members and non-party aktivs based in the countryside, who invited to submit reports on village life. In March 1924, a selkor named Grigori Malinovsky, from a village called Dymovka, in the Nikolaev (Mykolaiv) region of Ukraine, was murdered, after sending a report exposing two local officials whom he accused of bribery and intimidation. In October, Sosnovsky travelled to Nikolaev to deliver a long speech on behalf of the prosecution at the trial of six men accused of the murder, three of whom were executed. Sosnovsky interpreted the murder as part of the class struggle in the countryside between rich peasants (known as kulaks) and the poor. In an article published in Pravda in November 1924, he warned that "Dymovka is not an exceptional phenomenon". The publicity caused the number of selkors to swell by more than 100,000, to 115,000, in the 17 months to August 1925, but also exposed Sosnovsky to criticism for allegedly insulting party officials working in the countryside, until Stalin intervened personally in Sosnovsky's defence. In a speech to the Orgburo, in January 1926, Stalin pronounced that "it is to the credit of Pravda, to the credit of Sosnovsky, that they had the courage to drag into the light of day a piece of real life..." An editorial in Pravda in February 1925 entitled "The Lessons of Dymovka" warned that Malinovsky's murder was a symptom of the dangers of the growth of capitalism in the countryside.

== On Mayakovsky ==
In September 1921, Sosnovsky published a diatribe against the poet Vladimir Mayakovsky, who had successfully taken up a case in the relevant trade union against Ivan Skvortsov-Stepanov, head of the state publishing house, who had refused to pay for him for a script that had been published in a magazine. The case angered Sosnovsky because Skvortsov was an old comrade “who had joined the revolutionary movement before Mayakovsky was born.” Sosnovsky claimed that there was a movement that he called Mayakovshchina, full of “overgrown oafs” trying to be like the poet, warning that

“It is terrible to think how much money has been squandered through the youthfulness and stupidity of our Mayakovshchina... We will endeavour to compel you to stop these improper jokes.”

A few months later, the Bolshevik leader Vladimir Lenin came out in defence of Mayakovsky, but in January 1925, after Lenin's death, Sosnovsky returned to the attack. At a writers’ conference, in January 1925, he accused Mayakovsky to his face of insulting Lenin, by comparing him to a general. Actually, there had been a misprint. Mayakovsky had written перевал (pereval), meaning a pass, or trail, but in his absence this had been mistakenly transcribed as генерал (general).

== On Yesenin ==
In Summer 1926, Sosnovsky launched an even fiercer attack on the poet Sergei Yesenin, who had committed suicide the previous December. Writing in Pravda, he blamed the sexual references in Yesenin's work for a recent series of gang rapes by members of the communist youth league (Komsomol), and implied that his entire output should be banned. However, during a debate on literature at the Communist Academy in February 1927, he attributed Yesenin's popularity to the dreariness of political propaganda. When the young encountered human feelings in Yesenin's poetry, it was like “escaping from a cellar that reeks of rotten cabbage into the fresh air.”

== Left Opposition ==
Sosnovsky was one of the signatories of The Declaration of 46, and supported Leon Trotsky in the power struggle that followed the death of Lenin, despite their differences on cultural issues. (Trotsky defended Mayakovsky and Yesenin). Sosnovsky's opposition to the party leadership was based on economics: he believed that the communist party needed to act against the growing influence of kulaks, whom he accused of exploiting and intimidating poorer peasants. He was dismissed form the editorship of Bednota in 1924, but was allowed to continue working as a journalist on Pravda. He was one of "75 active leaders of the Trotskyist Opposition" expelled from the communist party during its 15th Congress, in December 1927.

After his expulsion, Sosnovsky was made to leave Moscow and take up a post in Barnaul. In exile, he was one of the last Trotskyists to capitulate and ask to be reinstated in the party. When the group led by Grigory Zinoviev surrendered, he wrote a scathing letter to Illarion Vardin, one of Zinoviev's supporters, citing what he said was a Jewish funeral custom:

"When the deceased is about to be carried out of the synagogue to the cemetery, the attendant leans towards the deceased, calls out by name and announces: 'Know that you are dead'."

In the latter part of 1928, when Stalin turned party policy sharply to the left, initiating a campaign against the kulaks, with Trotsky sent into enforced exile in Turkey, Sosnovsky was the leading voice among the remaining left oppositionists arguing that this was a "temporary manoeuvre" by Stalin, not a genuine turn to the left. He studied local conditions in Barnaul, where he calculated that just eight per cent of peasants were wealthy enough to own a threshing machine, which made the majority utterly dependent on them because

"in the entire arsenal of exploitative resources of the kulak, the thresher is the most poisonous. Due to climatic conditions, harvesting times are short here. The poor cannot wait a single extra day."

In May 1929, four letters that he had written in exile were published abroad in Trotsky's Bulletin of the Opposition. The OGPU appear to have known about these letters being smuggled abroad, because Sosnovsky was arrested in Barnaul on 29 April 1929, and in May he was sentenced to three years in prison, and transferred to an "isolator" in Chelyabinsk. By the end of 1929, after most of the leading Trotskyists, including Yevgeni Preobrazhensky and Karl Radek, had capitulated to Stalin, Sosnovsky was, after Christian Rakovsky, the best known oppositionist still holding out in exile. In January 1930, the Bulletin of the Opposition reported that Sosnovsky was editing a magazine Pravda Behind Bars produced by imprisoned Trotskyists. Sosnovsky was then transferred to an "isolator" in Tomsk In April 1932, he was sentenced to a further two years in prison.

== Final years ==
In 1934, following Rakovsky's capitulation, Sosnovsky decided that the completion of the First Five-year plan and the worsening international situation no longer justified his opposition to Stalin. He was permitted to return to Moscow, where his party membership was restored in 1935, and he was allowed to work as a journalist on the newspaper Izvestia, whose chief editor was Nikolai Bukharin Once again, he became one of the Soviet Union's most prominent journalists, who received a vast quantity of mail from people appealing to him to intercede for them and obtain justice. In September 1936, the head of the press department of the Central Committee, Boris Tal, visited the offices of Izvestia and sent a written report to Stalin and the other four secretaries of the Central Committee complaining that:

Through Izvestia, Sosnovsky received thousands of letters addressed to him personally, which were not seen by anyone else ... but remained in his personal archive. Sosnovsky literally became a collector of counter-revolutionary anonymous letters, vile libels against the Soviet government, a collector of requests and complaints ... Sosnovsky acquired, in Izvestia the reputation of a 'defender' and adviser to anyone angry and dissatisfied with the Soviet regime. All the letters Sosnovsky received are lying in cabinets and drawers. There is no exact record of these letters at all. There is every reason to believe that a lot of letters disappeared.

Sosnovsky was arrested again on 23 October 1936, accused of being a member of a 'Trotskyist-terrorist' organisation. Either shortly before his arrest, or while he was in prison, he wrote a begging letter to Bukharin saying that he had been fired from the newspaper and was desperately short of money. Bukharin sent him a small sum. In January 1937, Bukharin was hauled in front of Stalin and other members of the Politburo, and Sosnovsky was produced as a witness to say that the money was intended to finance terrorism.

Sosnovsky's name was on a death list signed on 15 May 1937 by Stalin, Molotov, Kaganovich, Voroshilov and Yezhov. He was sentenced to death in a secret trial on 3 July 1937, and shot the same day.

Sosnovsky was partially 'rehabilitated' in July 1958, when the verdict on which he was sentenced to death was overturned, posthumously. The earlier charge, on which he had been exiled and imprisoned in the 1930s, was overturned in July 1993.

== Family ==
Sosnovsky married a fellow Bolshevik, Olga Danilova Gerzhevan (1894–1941), who was also expelled from the communist party in 1927, as a supporter of the Left Opposition. In the mid-1930s, she worked in the political education sector of Moscow Zoo, until she was arrested in on 20 July 1937, as the wife of an 'enemy of the people', and sentenced to eight years in a labour camp in Mordvinia. In July 1939, she was brought back to Moscow, accused of being a member of a terrorist group of wives of "enemies of the people", tortured and forced to confess. She retracted her confession, but was nevertheless sentenced to death on 6 July 1941, and executed on 28 July. She was 'rehabilitated' in June 1956.

Their older son, Vladimir Lvovich (1920–1994) was expelled from school and evicted from the family apartment when his mother was arrested. He worked as a labourer in several towns before being called up for military service in 1941, then soon afterwards sentenced to ten years in labour camps for failing to carry out an order. In 1944, he received another ten-year sentence. He was released in December 1953, and reunited with his younger brother, Andrei, who had also survived a long prison term. In 1990, Vladimir Sosnovsky was one of the founders of the Memorial Society, set up to create a record of the repression.
