= Zarya (publication) =

Marxist Scientific and Political Journal

Zarya (Dawn) was a Russian Marxist theoretical and political journal published in Stuttgart, Germany by the editors of Iskra in 1901–1902. Four issues appeared.
