= Nash Put (1913) =

Nash Put (Russian: Наш путь, "Our Path") was a daily newspaper published in Moscow between September 7-25 1913. It functioned as a legal organ of the Russian Social Democratic Labour Party.

Lenin had argued in the summer of 1912 that an initiative to start a legal workers’ newspaper in Moscow should have been undertaken. However, the fundraising campaign for the new publication did not start until November that year. In call titled a 'Letter from a Group of Moscow Workers' appeared in Pravda no. 176 that month. The Pravda article called for collections of fund to start the new publication. 395 workers groups made contributions to the campaign. However, the launching of the publication was stalled for some time, as the Bolshevik nucleus organizing the effort were arrested.

The first issue of Nash Put appeared on September 7. The paper became widely spread amongst Moscow workers, and had a daily edition of 17-20 000.

Lenin took an active part in the Nash Put. Among the articles by Lenin published in Nash Put were:

- The Russian Bourgeoisie and Russian Reformism
- The Role of Social Estates and Glasses in the Liberation Movement
- Class War in Dublin
- A Week after the Dublin Massacre
- Questions of Principle in Politics
- Harry Quelch

Amongst the other contributors to Nash Put were Maxim Gorky, Demyan Bedny, M. S. Olminsky, I. I. Skvortsov-Stepanov, Joseph Stalin and the Bolshevik deputies to the Fourth Duma, Alexei Badayev, Fedor Samoilov and Nikolai Shagov.

Nash Put was banned on September 25. In protest of the closure of the publication a strike was launched by workers groups in the city, calling for a lifting of the ban. The ban was, however, not lifted.

== Sources ==
- V. I. Lenin. Pravda’s Anniversary
- V.I. Lenin. To Maxim Gorky
- V. I. Lenin, Collected Works, 4th English Edition, Progress Publishers, Moscow, 1968
