= Evgeniya Gutnova =

Soviet Russian historian and medievalist

- Born: 29 March 1914 (in Julian calendar); Saint Petersburg
- Died: 1 October 1992 (aged 78); Moscow
- Alma mater: MSU Faculty of History
- Employer: Institute of World History (1951–1992); MSU Faculty of History (1947–1971); Tomsk State University
- Parent(s): Vladimir Zederbaum

Evgeniya Vladimirovna Gutnova (Russian: Евгения Владимировна Гутнова; 1914 - 1992) was a Soviet Russian historian and medievalist, Doctor of Sciences in Historical Sciences (1957). She was a professor at the Lomonosov Moscow State University (since 1959).

Julius Martov is her uncle. Lydia Dan is her aunt.

She graduated from the Faculty of History at Lomonosov Moscow State University in 1939. She was a student of Eugene Kosminsky.

In 1942, she defended her candidate's dissertation on Thomas Carlyle. Her opponent was A. I. Neusykhin. In 1956, she defended her doctoral thesis on the history of the English Parliament. At MSU, she was a Deputy head of Department of History of the Middle Ages, which was then headed by Sergei Skazkin.

She published in Voprosy Istorii and Soviet Historical Encyclopedia.
