= Revolutionary calendar =

Revolutionary Calendar may refer to:

- Soviet calendar (Soviet revolutionary calendar)
- French Republican calendar (French Revolutionary calendar)
