= Eugene Kosminsky =

Soviet historian and medievalist (1886–1959)

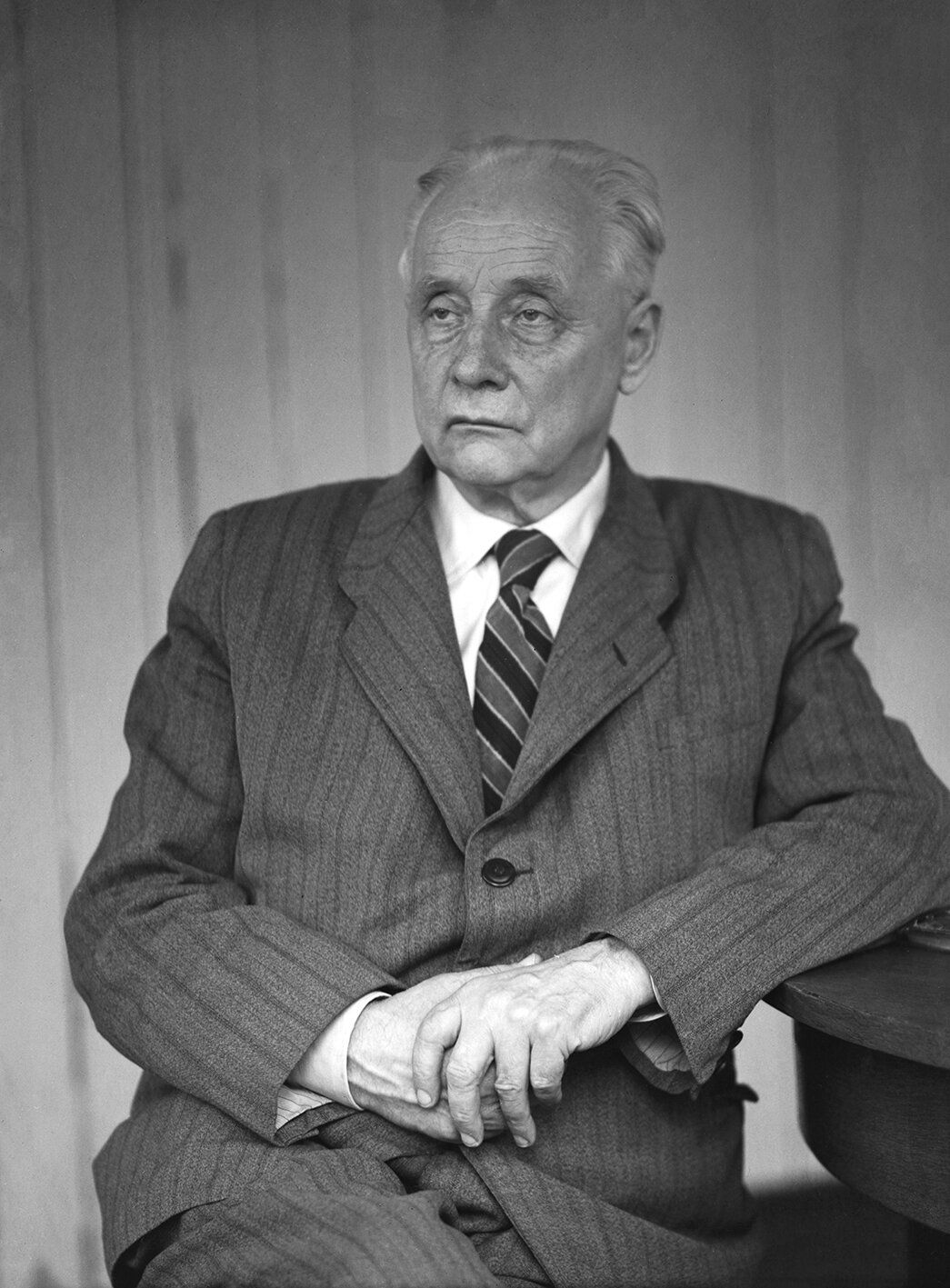
1942

Eugene Alekseyevich Kosminsky (Russian: Евгений Алексеевич Косминский; November 2, 1886 – July 24, 1959) was a Soviet historian and medievalist, Academician of the Academy of Sciences of the Soviet Union (since 1946). He was a professor at the Lomonosov Moscow State University (since 1919), first Head of the Department of History of the Middle Ages at MSU Faculty of History from 1934 to 1949. Laureate of the 1942 Stalin Prize.

== Biography ==
His father was a teacher. Eugene A. Kosminsky enrolled at the University of Warsaw. Then he studied at the University of Moscow under Professors Matvei Lyubavsky, Dmitry Petrushevsky and Robert Wipper. Kosminsky graduated in 1910.

From 1919 he was a professor at the Moscow State University. From 1934 to 1949, Kosminsky headed the Department of History of the Middle Ages. (During the war, A. I. Neusykhin was in his place.) He was succeeded by Sergei Skazkin.

From 1926 to 1935, he also served as Professor of the Institute of Red Professors. In 1936, he received the title of Doctor Nauk. Correspondent Member of the Academy of Sciences of the Soviet Union since 1939.

Evgeniya Gutnova was his student.

Alexander Kazhdan highly appreciated him.

Preceded by First	Head of the Department of History of the Middle Ages, MSU Faculty of History; 1934–1949	Succeeded by Sergei Skazkin
