= Kostroma electoral district =

Constituency of the Russian Republic

Kostroma
- Former Civilian constituency for the All-Russian Constituent Assembly
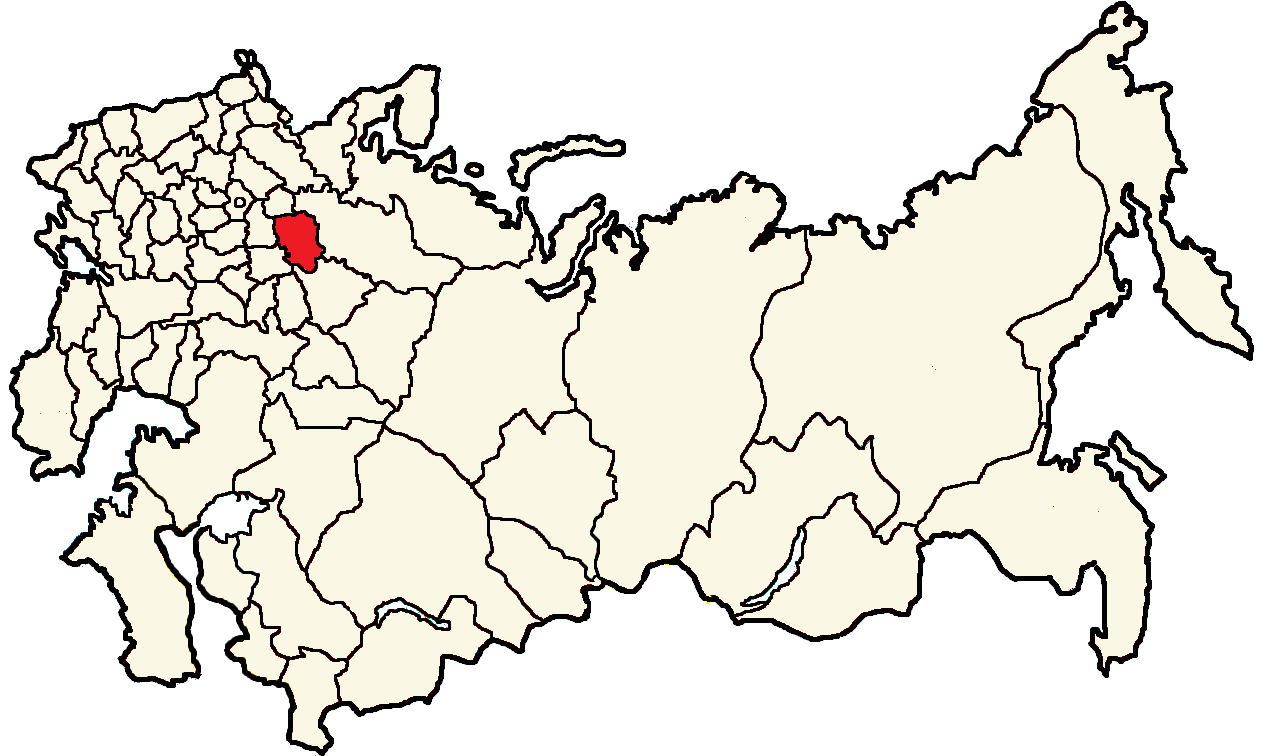

Former constituency
- Created: 1917
- Abolished: 1918
- Number of members: 8
- Number of Uyezd Electoral Commissions: 12
- Number of Urban Electoral Commissions: 1
- Number of Parishes: 264

The Kostroma electoral district (Russian: Костромский избирательный округ) was a constituency created for the 1917 Russian Constituent Assembly election. The electoral district covered the Kostroma Governorate.

Out 15 candidate lists submitted, 5 were rejected by the electoral authorities.

In Kostroma town the Bolsheviks won the election, with 12,190 votes (43.6%), followed by the Kadets with 6,265 votes (22.4%), the Orthodox list 3,457 votes (12.4%), Mensheviks 3,147 votes (11.3%) and SRs 2,885 votes (10.3%). The Bolshevik vote was largely drawn from the military, in the town barrack the Bolsheviks obtained 79.6% of the vote.

In Chukhloma out of 1,214 eligible voters, 787 participated - the Kadet list got 488 votes, the Bolsheviks 114 votes, the clergy 75 votes, the Mensheviks 46 votes and the SRs 41 votes.

== Results ==
Kostroma
| Party | Vote | % | Seats |
|---|---|---|---|
| List 1 - Socialist-Revolutionaries and Soviet of Peasants Deputies | 249,838 | 44.97 | 4 |
| List 4 - Bolsheviks | 226,905 | 40.84 | 4 |
| List 2 - Kadets | 41,448 | 7.46 | |
| List 3 - Mensheviks | 19,488 | 3.51 | |
| List 5 - Orthodox Clergy and Laymen | 17,901 | 3.22 | |
| Total: | 555,580 | | 8 |

Deputies Elected
| Kondratiev | SR |
| Kozlov | SR |
| Lotoshnikov | SR |
| Maltsev | SR |
| Danilov | Bolshevik |
| Larin-Lurie | Bolshevik |
| Malyutin | Bolshevik |
| Rostopchin | Bolshevik |
