= Dmitry Petrushevsky =

Russian historian (1863–1942)

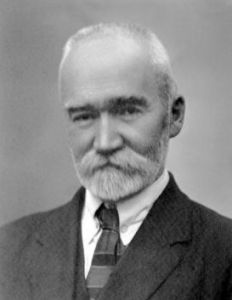
- Died: 12 December 1942; Kazan (Soviet Union)
- Occupation: Historian, medievalist

Dmitry Moiseevich Petrushevsky (Russian: Дмитрий Моисеевич Петрушевский; 13 September [O.S. 1 September] 1863 – 12 December 1942) was a Russian and Soviet historian, medievalist, Academician of the USSR Academy of Sciences (since 1929).

His father was a priest in the village.

He graduated from the Taras Shevchenko National University of Kyiv in 1886.

His earned his Master's Degree in 1897 and doctoral degree in 1901. He was a student of Paul Vinogradoff.

From 1906 he taught at The Higher Courses for Women in Moscow.

From 1917 he was an ordinary professor at the Moscow State University.

In 1925, he received the title of Distinguished Professor.

His students were Eugene Kosminsky and A. I. Neusykhin.
