= Fyodor Dan =

Russian Menshevik and journalist (1871–1947)

- Фёдор Дан
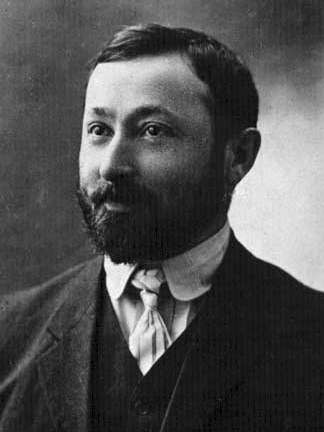

Member of the Provisional Council of the Russian Republic
- In office 3 October 1917 – 7 November 1917
- Preceded by: Office established
- Succeeded by: Office abolished

Personal details
- Born: Fyodor Ilyich Gurvich; 19 October 1871 Saint Petersburg, Russia
- Died: 22 January 1947 (aged 75) New York City, U.S.
- Party: RSDLP (Mensheviks)
- Spouse: Lydia Dan
- Education: University of Yuryev
- Occupation: Doctor; journalist; politician

Fyodor Ilyich Dan (Russian: Фёдор Ильи́ч Дан; 19 October [O.S. 7 October] 1871 – 22 January 1947), original surname Gurvich (Гу́рвич), was a Russian political activist and journalist who helped found the Menshevik faction of the Russian Social Democratic Labour Party.

== Background ==
Fyodor Dan was born to a Jewish family in St. Petersburg, where his father owned a pharmacy. From 1889 to 1895 he studied at the Imperial University of Dorpat.

In 1895 he graduated from the medical faculty of Yuryev University (now University of Tartu) and became a doctor. He participated in the social democratic movement from 1894

== Career ==
Dan was a lifelong socialist activist and journalist. He was a member of the St. Petersburg Union of Struggle for the Emancipation of the Working Class and was one of the organizers of the textile workers' strike. In 1896 he was arrested and deported for 5 years to Vyatka Governorate.

=== Menshevism ===
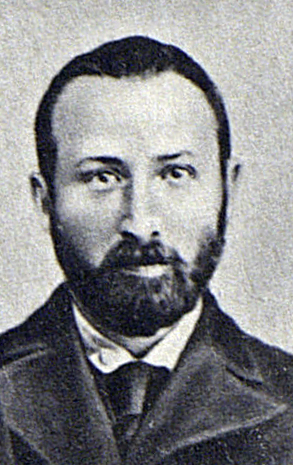
Dan in 1906

In the summer of 1901 he emigrated to Berlin, where he joined the Iskra assistance group. On his return, he joined the Russian Social Democratic Labour Party in 1902 and went to London for their Second Congress in 1903. Dan aligned himself with Julius Martov who wanted to have a larger party of activists, rather than Vladimir Lenin's conception of a smaller party of professional revolutionaries.

In 1904 he wrote the first official history of the early years of the RSDLP. Dan helped Martov form the Mensheviks, returning to Russia in 1912. He was an active member of the irregular freemasonic lodge, the Grand Orient of Russia's Peoples. From 1913 he worked legally in Russia. Editor of the newspaper Golos Sotsial-Demorata and was a member of the Menshevik Central Committee. In 1915 he was arrested and exiled to Siberia. He was pardoned and mobilized as a military doctor with the outbreak of WWI.

=== Russian Revolution ===
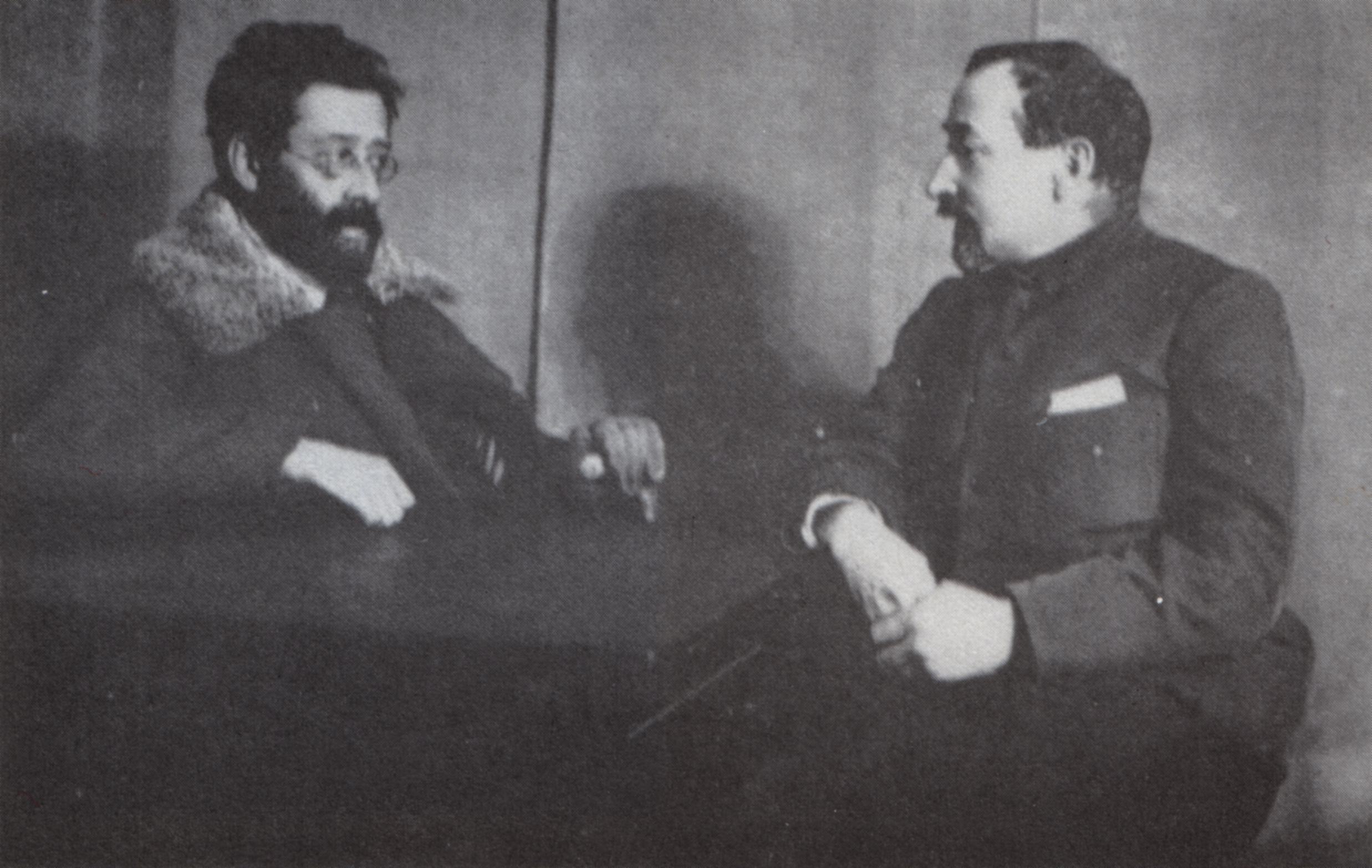
Dan speaking with Julius Martov c. 1917–1918

After the February Revolution of 1917 he became an ideologist of "revolutionary defencism". One of the most notable figures of the period, he was a member of the Executive Committee of the Petrograd Soviet and the Presidium of the Central Executive Committee of the 1st convocation. After the October Revolution he worked as a doctor. At the 7th (December 1919) and 8th (December 1920) All-Russian Congresses of Soviets, he was a speaker on behalf of the Mensheviks.

=== Exile ===
Dan was arrested on the order of the Soviet authorities in 1921 and after a year in prison was sent into exile on charges of being an "enemy of the people". In 1923 he participated in the creation of the Socialist Workers' International. In the same year he was deprived of Soviet citizenship. After the death of Julius Martov in 1923, until 1940, he headed the Foreign Delegation of the Menshevik faction of the RSDLP.

When the Soviet Union was attacked in 1941, Dan gave his support to the country. In his book The Origins of Bolshevism (1943) he argued that Bolshevism was the carrier of socialism, whilst still arguing for political liberalisation in the Soviet Union.

== Personal life ==
Fyodor Dan was married to Martov's sister Lydia Cederbaum. Their daughter Anna died in infancy.

== Death ==
Dan left France during the Second World War for refuge in the United States. He died in New York City on January 22, 1947.

== Works ==
- Dva godi skitanie [Two Years of Wandering] Berlin, 1922.
- The origin of Bolshevism. Joel Carmichael, ed. and trans. New York: Harper and Row, 1964.
- Letters (1899–1946). Dan B. Sapir, ed. and trans. Amsterdam, 1985.
- Fedor I. Dan und Otto Bauer. Briefwechsel (1934–1938). Frankfurt, 1999.
- Two Years of Wandering: A Menshevik Leader in Lenin's Russia. [1922] Francis King, ed. and trans. London: Lawrence & Wishart, 2016.

== See also ==
- Bibliography of the Russian Revolution and Civil War
- Outline of the Russian Revolution and Civil War
- Index of articles related to the Russian Revolution and Civil War
- Julius Martov
- Menshevism
- Russian Social Democratic Labour Party
- Russian Constituent Assembly
