= Soviet calendar =

Calendar reforms in early 20th century Russia

The Soviet calendar was a modified Gregorian calendar that was used in Soviet Russia between 1918 and 1940. Several variations were used during that time.

The Gregorian calendar, under the name "Western European calendar", was implemented in Soviet Russia in February 1918 by dropping the Julian dates of 1–13 February 1918. As many as nine national holidays (paid days of rest) were implemented in the following decade, but four were eliminated or merged on 24 September 1929, leaving only five national holidays: 22 January, 1–2 May, and 7–8 November until 1951, when 22 January reverted to a normal day.

During the summer of 1929, five-day continuous work weeks were implemented in factories, government offices, and commercial enterprises, but not collective farms. One of the five days was randomly assigned to each worker as their day of rest; the purpose of this system was to allow factories to operate every day, always having most of its workers present to maintain production. These five-day work weeks continued throughout the Gregorian year, interrupted only by the five national holidays. While the five-day week was used for scheduling work, the Gregorian calendar and its seven-day week were used for all other purposes.

During the summer of 1931, six-day interrupted work weeks were implemented for most workers, with a common day of rest for all workers interrupting their work weeks. Five six-day work weeks were assigned to each Gregorian month, more or less, with the five national holidays converting normal work days into days of rest. On 27 June 1940 five- and six-day work weeks were abandoned in favor of seven-day work weeks.

== History ==
=== Byzantine calendar ===
The Byzantine calendar was used from c. 988 to 1700 before the adoption of the Julian calendar.

=== Gregorian calendar ===
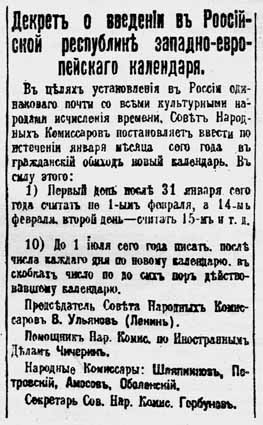
1918 decree adopting the "Western European calendar" (click on image for translation)

The Gregorian calendar was adopted on 14 February 1918 by dropping the Julian dates of 1–13 February 1918 pursuant to a Sovnarkom decree signed 24 January 1918 (Julian) by Vladimir Lenin. The decree required that the Julian date was to be written in parentheses after the Gregorian date until 1 July 1918. All surviving examples of physical calendars from 1929–40 show the irregular month lengths of the Gregorian calendar (such as those displayed here). Most calendars displayed all the days of a Gregorian year as a grid with seven rows or columns for the traditional seven-day week with Sunday (Воскресенье; "Resurrection") first.

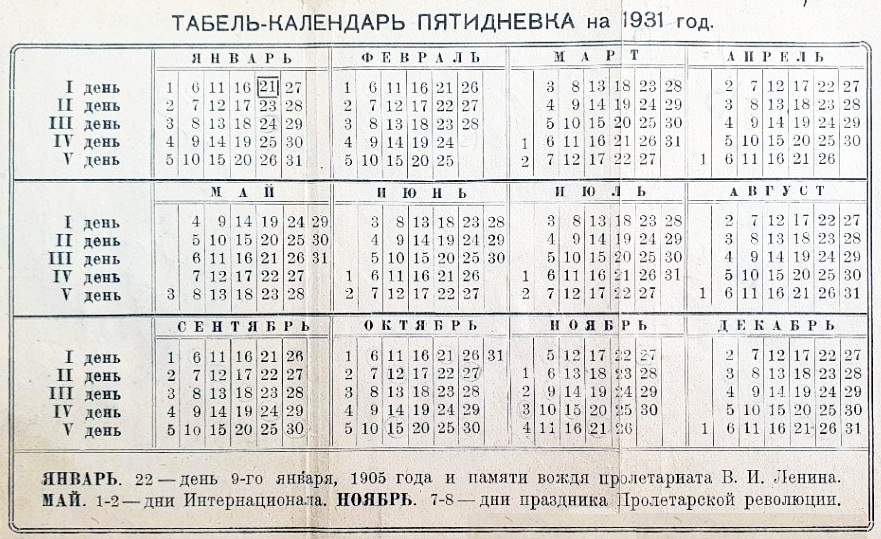
Soviet pocket calendar, 1931 Numbered five-day work week, excluding five national holidays

The 1931 pocket calendar displayed here is a rare example that excluded the five national holidays, enabling the remaining 360 days of the Gregorian year to be displayed as a grid with five rows labeled I–V for each day of the five-day week. Even it had the full Gregorian calendar on the other side.

=== Work weeks ===
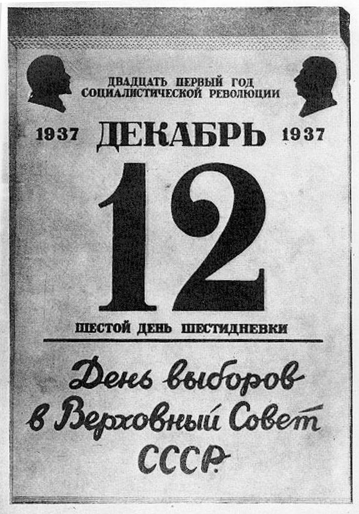
Soviet calendar
12 December 1937
"Sixth day of the six-day week" (just below "12")
—————————
"Election day for the Supreme Soviet of the USSR"

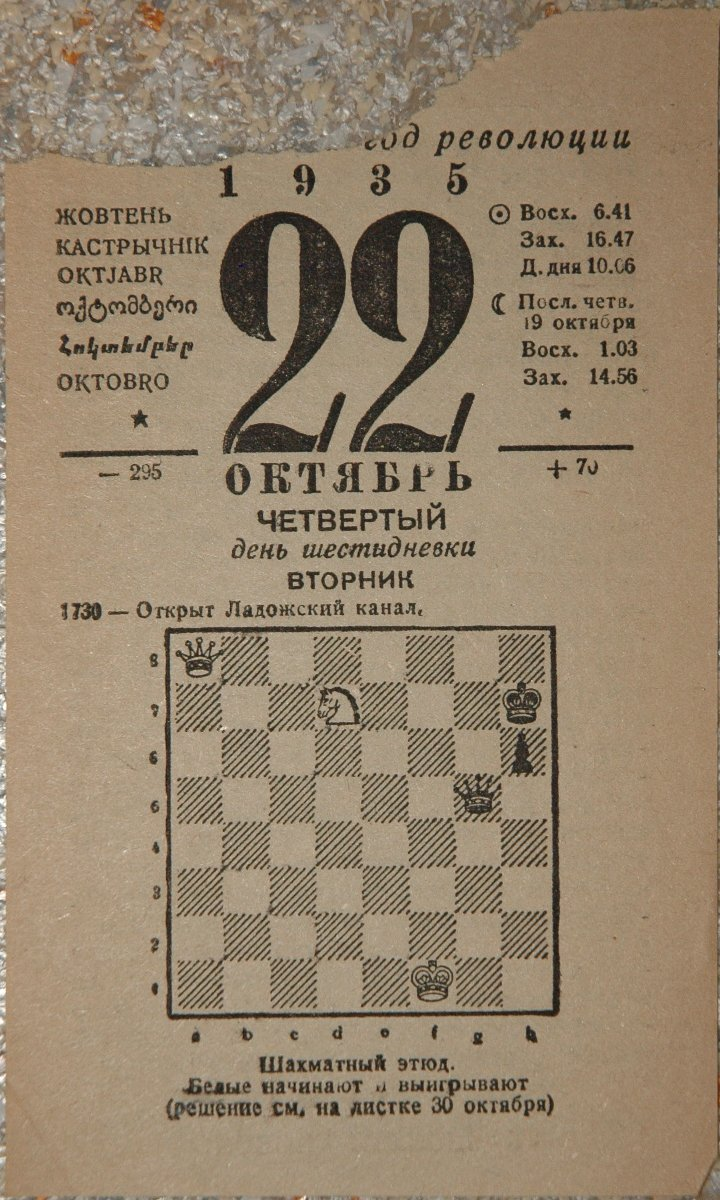
Soviet calendar
22 October 1935
"Fourth day of the six-day week" (just below "ОКТЯБРЬ")

During the second half of May 1929, Yuri Larin proposed a continuous production week (nepreryvnaya rabochaya nedelya = nepreryvka) to the Fifth Congress of Soviets of the Union, but so little attention was paid to his suggestion that the president of the Congress did not even mention it in his final speech. By the beginning of June 1929, Larin had won the approval of Joseph Stalin, prompting all newspapers to praise the idea. The rationale was that while workers needed rest, machines did not; therefore, scheduling workers' days off in such a way as to maintain factories constantly in operation would make it possible to produce more for less time. In addition, the change was advantageous to the anti-religious movement, as Sundays and religious holidays became working days. On 8 June 1929 the Supreme Economic Council of the RSFSR directed its efficiency experts to submit within two weeks a plan to introduce continuous production. Before any plan was available, during the first half of June 1929, 15% of industry had converted to continuous production according to Larin, probably an overestimate. On 26 August 1929 the Council of People's Commissars (CPC) of the Soviet Union (Sovnarkom) declared "it is essential that the systematically prepared transition of undertakings and institutions to continuous production should begin during the economic year 1929–1930". The lengths of continuous production weeks were not yet specified, and the conversion was only to begin during the year. Nevertheless, many sources state that the effective date of five-day weeks was 1 October 1929, which was the beginning of the economic year. But many other lengths of continuous work weeks were used, all of which were gradually introduced.

=== Implementation of continuous production weeks ===
Specific lengths for continuous production weeks were first mentioned when rules for the five-day continuous work week were issued on 24 September 1929. On 23 October 1929 building construction and seasonal trades were put on a continuous six-day week, while factories that regularly halted production every month for maintenance were put on six- or seven-day continuous production weeks. In December 1929, it was reported that about 50 different versions of the continuous work week were in use, the longest being a 'week' of 37 days (30 continuous days of work followed by seven days of rest). By the end of 1929, orders were issued that the continuous week was to be extended to 43% of industrial workers by 1 April 1930 and to 67% by 1 October 1930. Actual conversion was more rapid, 63% by 1 April 1930. In June 1930 it was decreed that the conversion of all industries was to be completed during the economic year 1930–31, except for the textile industry. But on 1 October 1930 peak usage was reached, with 72.9% of industrial workers on continuous schedules. Thereafter, usage decreased. All of these official figures were somewhat inflated because some factories said they adopted the continuous week without actually doing so. The continuous week was applied to retail and government workers as well, but no usage figures were ever published.

The continuous week began as a five-day cycle, with each day color-coded and marked with a symbol. The population would be carved up into as many groups, each with its own rest day. These circles indicated when you worked and when you rested.

=== Implementation of six-day weeks ===
As early as May 1930, while usage of the continuous week was still advancing, some factories reverted to an interrupted week. On 30 April 1931, one of the largest factories in the Soviet Union was put on an interrupted six-day week (Шестидневка = shestidnevka). On 23 June 1931, Stalin condemned the continuous work week as then practiced, supporting the temporary use of the interrupted six-day week (one common rest day for all workers) until the problems with the continuous work week could be resolved. During August 1931, most factories were put on an interrupted six-day week as the result of an interview with the People's Commissar for Labor, who severely restricted the use of the continuous week. The official conversion to non-continuous schedules was decreed by the Sovnarkom of the USSR somewhat later, on 23 November 1931. Institutions serving cultural and social needs and those enterprises engaged in continuous production such as ore smelting were exempted. It is often stated that the effective date of the interrupted six-day work week was 1 December 1931, but that is only the first whole month after the 'official conversion'. The massive summer 1931 conversion made this date after-the-fact and some industries continued to use continuous weeks. The last figures available indicate that on 1 July 1935 74.2% of all industrial workers were on non-continuous schedules (almost all six-day weeks) while 25.8% were still on continuous schedules. Due to a decree dated 26 June 1940, the traditional interrupted seven-day week with Sunday as the common day of rest was reintroduced on 27 June 1940.

== Five-day weeks ==
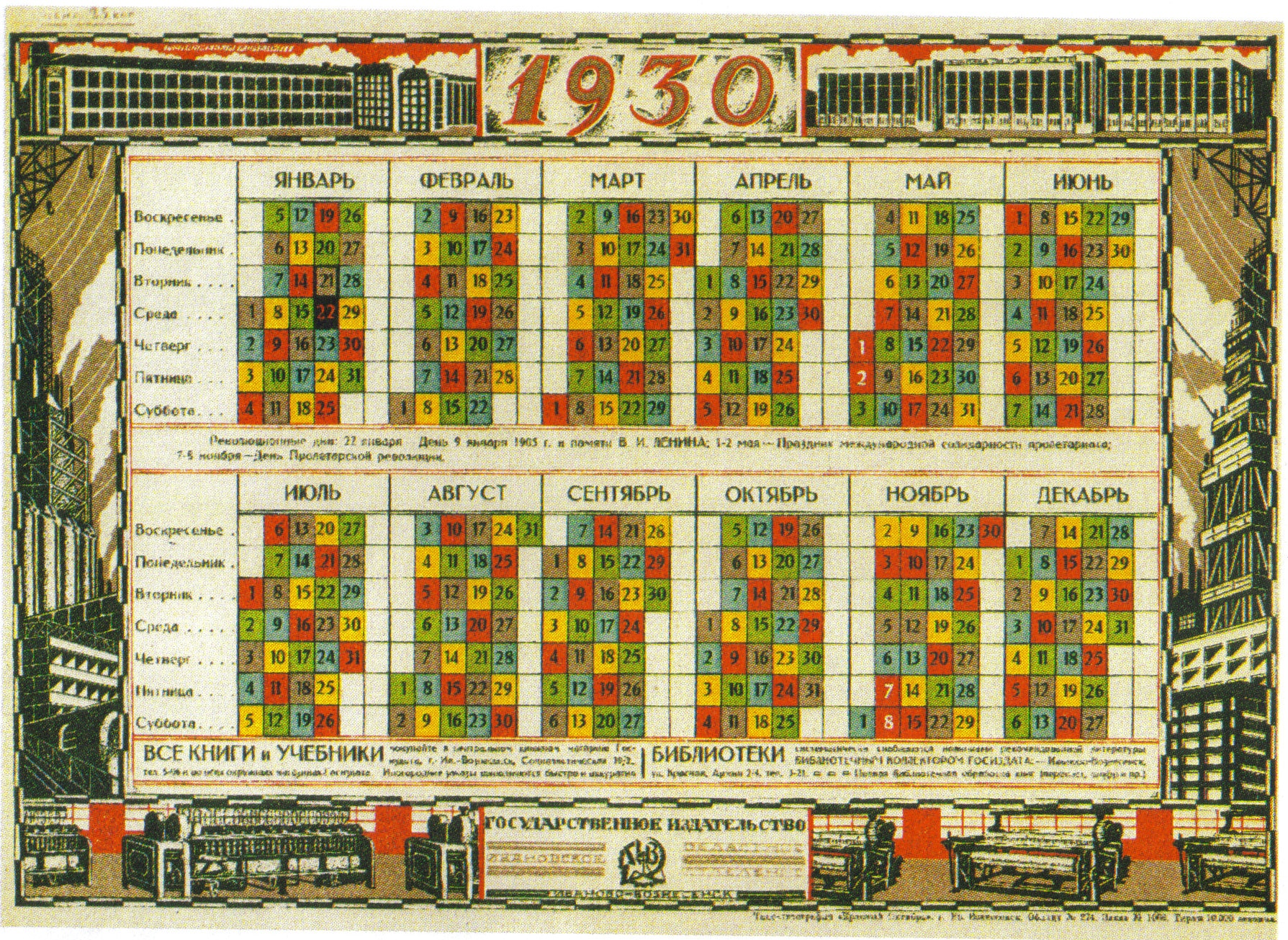
Soviet calendar, 1930 Colored five-day work week. Days grouped into seven-day weeks. One national holiday in black, four with white numbers

Each day of the five-day week was labeled by either one of five colors or a Roman numeral from I to V. Each worker was assigned a color or number to identify his or her day of rest.

Eighty percent of each factory's workforce was at work every day (except holidays) in an attempt to increase production while 20% were resting. But when spouses, and their relatives and friends, were assigned different colors or numbers, they did not have a common rest day for their family and social life. Furthermore, machines broke down more frequently both because they were used by workers not familiar with them, and because no maintenance could be performed on machines that were never idle in factories with continuous schedules (24 hours/day every day). Five-day weeks (and later six-day weeks) "made it impossible to observe Sunday as a day of rest."

The colors vary depending on the source consulted. The 1930 color calendar displayed here has days of purple, blue, yellow, red, and green, in that order beginning 1 January. Blue was supported by an anonymous writer in 1936 as the second day of the week, but he stated that red was the first day of the week. However, most sources replace blue with either pink, orange, or peach, all of which specify the different order yellow, pink/orange/peach, red, purple, and green.

== Six-day weeks ==
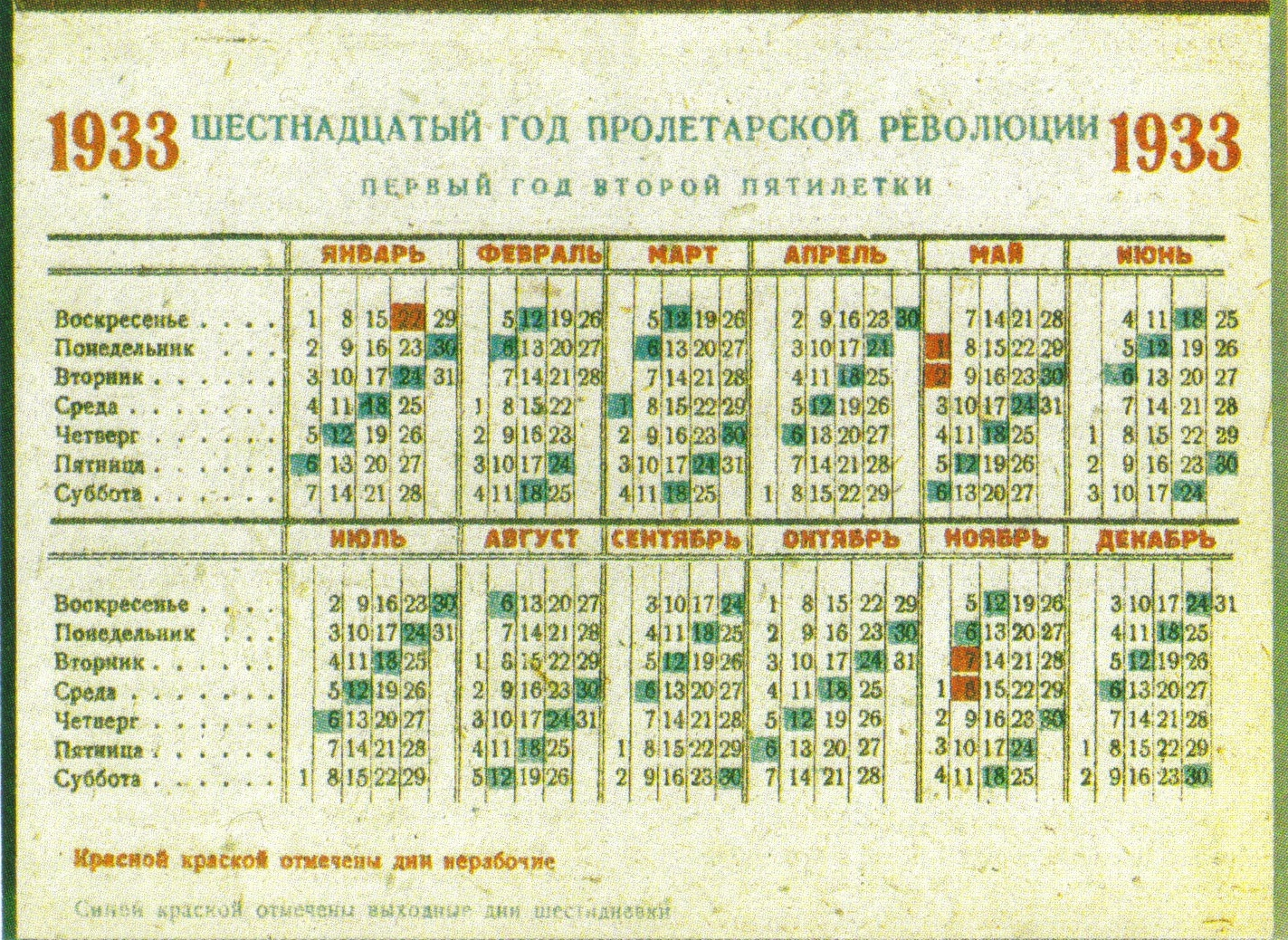
Soviet calendar, 1933 Days grouped into 7-day weeks (still starting with Sunday). Rest day of six-day work week in blue. Five national holidays in red

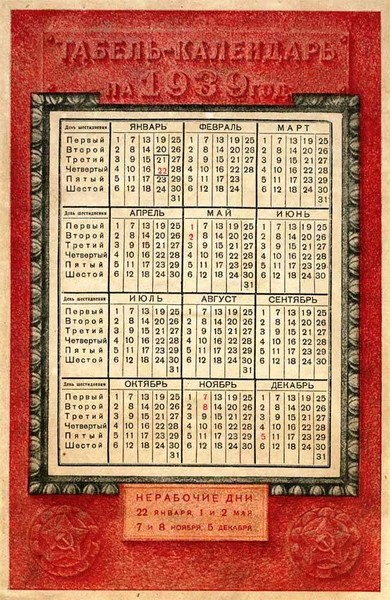
Soviet calendar, 1939 Reusable every (common) year: Six-day work weeks only, days denoted "First" to "Sixth". Each 31st is extra, February is short. Six holidays in red and listed below – added 5 December for Stalin Constitution of 1936; special box for 21 January remembrance

From the summer of 1931 until Wednesday 26 June 1940, each Gregorian month was divided into five six-day weeks, more or less (as shown by the 1933 and 1939 calendars here). The sixth day of each week, that is days 6, 12, 18, 24, and 30 of the month, was a uniform day off for all workers. The last day of 31-day months was always an extra work day in factories, which combined with the first five days of the following month made six successive work days. But some commercial and government offices treated the 31st day as an extra day off. To make up for the short fifth week of February, which had just four work days in common years (25–28) and five in leap years (25–29), 1 March was a uniform day off followed by only four work days in the first week of March (2–5). But some enterprises treated 1 March as a regular work day, producing nine or ten successive work days between 25 February and 5 March, inclusive. The national holidays did not change, but they now converted five regular work days into holidays within three six-day weeks (none of these was on a free day, with a date divisible by 6), so May and November had just three days of work after three consecutive days off, unlike the earlier five-day week when the holidays "delayed the rotation" of colors and were inserted as an extra day splitting the four-day working period into two parts (or creating a longer break between two four-days of work for people whose standard day off was just before or after the holiday).

== National holidays ==
On 10 December 1918 six Bolshevik holidays were decreed during which work was prohibited.

- 1 January – New Year's Day
- 22 January – Day of 9 January 1905
  Commemorates Bloody Sunday on 9 January 1905 (Julian) or 22 January 1905 (Gregorian)
- 12 March – Day of the Overthrow of the Autocracy
  Commemorates the mutiny of the Imperial Guards (about 60,000 soldiers) in Petrograd (now Saint Petersburg) on 27 February 1917 (Julian) or 12 March 1917 (Gregorian) during the February Revolution
- 18 March – Day of the Paris Commune
  Commemorates the uprising of the National Guard of Paris on 18 March 1871 (Gregorian) which established the Paris Commune
- 1 May – Day of the International
  Celebration within Russia and later the Soviet Union of International Workers' Day
- 7 November – Day of the Proletarian Revolution
  Commemorates the Bolshevik uprising on 25 October 1917 (Julian) or 7 November 1917 (Gregorian)

In January 1925, the anniversary of Lenin's death in 1924 was added on 21 January. Although other events were commemorated on other dates, they were not days of rest. Originally, the "May holidays" and "November holidays" were one day each (1 May and 7 November), but both were extended from one to two days in 1928, making 2 May and 8 November public holidays as well.

Until 1929, regional labor union councils or local governments were authorized to set up additional public holidays, totaling to up to 10 days a year. Although people would not work on those days, they would not be paid holidays. Typically, at least some of these days were used for religious feast, typically those of the Russian Orthodox Church, but in some localities possibly those of other religions as well.

On 24 September 1929, three holidays were eliminated, 1 January, 12 March, and 18 March. Lenin's Day on 21 January was merged with 22 January. The resulting five holidays continued to be celebrated until 1951, when 22 January ceased to be a holiday. See История праздников России (History of the festivals of Russia).

- 22 January – Day of Remembrance of 9 January 1905 and of the Memory of V.I. Lenin
  Commemorates Bloody Sunday on 9 January 1905 (Julian) or 22 January 1905 (Gregorian) and the death of Vladimir Lenin on 21 January 1925 (Gregorian)
- 1–2 May – Days of the International
- 7–8 November – Days of the Anniversary of the October Revolution

Two Journal of Calendar Reform articles (1938 and 1943) have two misunderstandings, specifying 9 January and 26 October, not realizing that both are Julian calendar dates equivalent to the unspecified Gregorian dates 22 January and 8 November, so they specify 9 January, 21 January, 1 May, 26 October, and 7 November, plus a quadrennial leap day.

== Erroneous reporting of "30-day months" ==
Many sources erroneously state that both five- and six-day work weeks were collected into 30-day months.

A 1929 Time magazine article reporting Soviet five-day work weeks, which it called an "Eternal calendar", associated them with the French Republican Calendar, which had months containing three ten-day weeks. In February 1930 a government commission proposed a "Soviet revolutionary calendar" containing twelve 30-day months plus five national holidays that were not part of any month, but it was rejected because it would differ from the Gregorian calendar used by the rest of Europe. Four Journal of Calendar Reform articles (1938, 1940, 1943, 1954) thought that five-day weeks actually were collected into 30-day months, as do several modern sources.

A 1931 Time magazine article reporting six-day weeks stated that they too were collected into 30-day months, with the five national holidays between those months. Two of the Journal of Calendar Reform articles (1938 and 1943) thought that six-day as well as five-day weeks were collected into 30-day months. A couple of modern sources state that five-day weeks plus the first two years of six-day weeks were collected into 30-day months.

Apparently to place the five national holidays between 30-day months since 1 October 1929, Parise (1982) shifted Lenin's Day to 31 January, left two Days of the Proletariat on 1–2 May, and shifted two Days of the Revolution to 31 October and 1 November, plus 1 January (all Gregorian dates). Stating that all months had 30 days between 1 October 1929 and 1 December 1931, the Oxford Companion to the Year (1999) 'corrected' Parise's list by specifying that "Lenin Day" was after 30 January (31 January Gregorian), a two-day "Workers' First of May" was after 30 April (1–2 May Gregorian), two "Industry Days" were after 7 November (8–9 November Gregorian), and placed the leap day after 30 February (2 March Gregorian).

Throughout this period, Pravda, the official newspaper of the Communist Party, and other newspapers continued to use Gregorian calendar dates in their mastheads alongside the traditional seven-day week. Pravda dated individual issues with 31 January, 31 March, 31 May, 31 July, 31 August, 31 October, and 31 December, but never used 30 February during the period 1929–1940. The traditional names of "Resurrection" (воскресенье) for Sunday and "Sabbath" (суббота) for Saturday continued to be used, despite the government's officially anti-religious atheistic policy. In rural areas, the traditional seven-day week continued to be used despite official disfavor. Several sources from the 1930s state that the old Gregorian calendar was not changed. Two modern sources explicitly state that the structure of the Gregorian calendar was not touched.
