= Alexander Kazhdan =

Soviet and American historian (1922–1997)

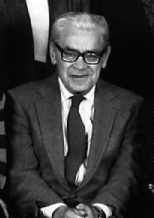
- Kazhdan in 1992
- Born: Александр Петрович Каждан; 3 September 1922; Moscow, Russian SFSR
- Died: 29 May 1997 (aged 74); Washington, D.C., U.S.
- Known for: Oxford Dictionary of Byzantium
- Children: David Kazhdan

Academic background
- Education: Moscow State University; Bashkir Pedagogical Institute; Academy of Sciences of the Soviet Union (PhD)
- Thesis: Аграрные отношения в Византии в XIII–XIV веках (1946)
- Doctoral advisor: Eugene Kosminsky

Academic work
- Discipline: Byzantine studies
- Institutions: Ivanovo Pedagogical Institute (1947–49); Tula Pedagogical Institute (1949–52); Velikiye Luki Pedagogical Institute (1952–56); Soviet Academy of Sciences (1956–78); Harvard University; Dumbarton Oaks (1979–97)

Alexander Petrovich Kazhdan (Russian: Александр Петрович Каждан, romanized: Aleksándr Petróvich Kazhdán, IPA: [ɐlʲɪkˈsandr pʲɪˈtrovʲɪt͡ɕ kɐʐˈdan]; 3 September 1922 – 29 May 1997) was a Soviet and American Byzantinist. Among his publications was the three-volume Oxford Dictionary of Byzantium, a comprehensive encyclopedic work containing more than 5,000 entries.

== Biography ==
Born into the affluent Jewish family of the leather and chemical industrialist Pyotr Israilevich Kazhdan (born Peisakh Efros) and Anna (née Frumson), Kazhdan was raised in Moscow by his maternal grandmother Tamara Frumson, a member of the Rostov-on-Don Jewish elite from the Tsarist era. While attending school in 1934–35, he published poems in the children's magazine Pionerskaya Pravda.

Kazhdan studied history at Moscow State University from 1939. In December 1941, as the Nazi German invasion of the Soviet Union threatened Moscow, he was rejected from service in the Red Army due to his extreme short-sightedness and evacuated to Ufa, where he graduated from the Bashkir Pedagogical Institute in 1942. From 1943, he pursued doctoral studies as an aspirant at Moscow State University and then with Eugene Kosminsky, a historian of medieval England, at the Academy of Sciences of the Soviet Union. A post-war Soviet initiative to revive Russian-language Byzantine studies led Kazhdan to write a Candidate of Sciences dissertation on the agrarian history of the late Byzantine Empire, defended in 1946 and published in 1952.

The anti-cosmopolitan campaign launched in the Soviet Union in late 1946 is said to have prevented Kazhdan's career at the Academy of Sciences. Instead, he held a series of academic teaching positions at the Ivanovo Pedagogical Institute in Ivanovo (1947–49), the Tula Pedagogical Institute in Tula (1949–52) and the Velikiye Luki Pedagogical Institute in Velikiye Luki (1953–56), from where he established contact with Byzantine studies scholars in the West. He completed his Doctor of Sciences dissertation at Tula but only obtained the degree in 1961, for which he blamed his clashes with the Soviet Byzantinists Elena Lipshits, Mitrofan Levchenko and Zinaida Udaltsova.

In 1956, Kazhdan secured a position at the Institute of World History of the Soviet Academy of Sciences in Moscow, in which he remained until leaving the Soviet Union in 1978.

After Kazhdan's religious son, the mathematician David Kazhdan, accepted a position at Harvard University and emigrated to the United States in 1975, Kazhdan began to experience professional difficulties in the Soviet Union; his wife, Rimma (Musya), was fired from her position at Progress Publishers, Kazhdan was told he would not be allowed return travel to see his family in the United States, and censorship of his work by his superiors in the Soviet academic establishment increased. In October 1978 Kazhdan and his wife departed from the Soviet Union, having received a visa for immigration to Israel. Kazhdan lectured briefly at the University of Vienna, the Collège de France and the University of Birmingham before moving on to the United States. In February 1979 he and his wife arrived at Dumbarton Oaks, a center for Byzantine studies in Washington, D.C., where Kazhdan held the position of senior research associate until his death.

== Work ==
=== Soviet Union ===
Kazhdan was a prolific scholar throughout his career in the Soviet Union, publishing 555 books, articles, and reviews in total (including foreign translations). His 1954 article, "Vizantiyskie goroda v VII-XI vv.", published in the journal Sovetskaya arkheologiya, argued on the basis of archaeological and numismatic evidence that the seventh century constituted a major rupture in the urban society of Byzantium. This thesis was widely accepted in the second half of the twentieth century and led to intensive research on discontinuity in Byzantine history and the subsequent rejection of the earlier conception of the medieval Byzantine empire as a frozen relic of late antiquity. Other major studies dating from this first half of Kazhdan's career include Derevnya i gorod v Vizantii IX-X vv. (1960), a study of the relationship between city and countryside in the ninth and tenth centuries; Vizantiyskaya kul'tura (X–XII vv.) (1968), a study of Middle Byzantine culture; and Sotsial'nyi sostav gospodstvuyushchego klassa Vizantii XI–XII vv. (1974), an influential prosopographical and statistical study of the structure of the Byzantine ruling class in the eleventh and twelfth centuries. Kazhdan also contributed heavily to the field of Armenian studies, notably writing about the Armenians who formed the elite ruling classes that governed the Byzantine Empire during the Middle Byzantine Era in his Armiane v sostave gospodstvuyushchego klassa Vizantiyskoy imperii v XI-XII vv. (1975).

Kazhdan's publications were removed from circulation after his emigration to the United States. His Russian students include Mikhail Bibikov, Sergey Ivanov, and Igor Chichurov.

=== United States ===
Kazhdan's first major publications in English were collaborative: People and Power in Byzantium (1982), a broad ranging study of Byzantine society, was written with Giles Constable; Studies in Byzantine literature (1984) with Simon Franklin; and Change in Byzantine Culture in the Eleventh and Twelfth Centuries (1985) with Ann Wharton Epstein. His greatest English-language project was likewise a massive collaborative effort: the three-volume Oxford Dictionary of Byzantium (1991), edited by Kazhdan, was the first reference work of the sort ever to be published, and remains an indispensable point of departure for all areas of Byzantine studies. He wrote approximately 20%, or about 1,000, of the entries himself.

As Kazhdan became more comfortable with English, his pace of publication once again matched that of his Russian years. His later scholarship is above all marked with a growing concern with Byzantine literature, particularly hagiography. In his later texts, he proposed to seek the origins of Russian and Eastern European totalitarianism in Byzantium.

Kazhdan died in Washington, D.C., in 1997. His death cut short his work on a monumental History of Byzantine Literature; however, the first volume of this work (covering the period from 650 to 850) was published in 1999, and the second (for the period from 850 to 1000) followed in 2006.

== Main publications ==
=== Books ===
- Аграрные отношения в Византии XIII–XIV в., (Note: English: Agrarian Relations in Byzantium, 13th–14th c.) Moskva: Akademiya Nauk SSSR, 1952.
- Религия и атеизм в древнем мире, (Note: English: Religion and Atheism in the Ancient World.) Moskva: Akademiya Nauk SSSR, 1957.
- Деревня и город в Византии IХ–Х вв. Очерки по истории византийского феодализма, (Note: English: Village and City in Byzantium in the 9th–10th Centuries: Essays on the History of Byzantine Feudalism.) Moskva: Akademiya Nauk SSSR, 1960.
- Византийская культура (X–XII вв.), (Note: English: Byzantine Culture (10th–12th c.).) Moskva: Nauka, 1968 (reissued and expanded: Moskva: Aleteyya, 2006).
- Социальный состав господствующего класса Византии в XI–XII вв., (Note: English: Social Composition of the Ruling Class of Byzantium in the 11th–12th Centuries.) Moskva: Nauka, 1974.
- People and Power in Byzantium: An Introduction to Modern Byzantine Studies (with Giles Constable), Washington, DC: Dumbarton Oaks, 1982, ISBN 0-88402-103-3.
- Studies on Byzantine Literature of the Eleventh and Twelfth Centuries (with Simon Franklin; Past and Present Publications), Cambridge: Cambridge University Press, 1984, ISBN 978-0-511-73542-4, doi:10.1017/CBO9780511735424.
- Change in Byzantine Culture in the Eleventh and Twelfth Centuries (with Ann Wharton Epstein), Berkeley, CA: University of California Press, 1985, ISBN 0-520-06962-5.
- The Oxford Dictionary of Byzantium (ed.), 3 vols., New York: Oxford University Press, 1991.
- L'aristocrazia bizantina dal principio dell'XI alla fine del XII secolo (with Silvia Ronchey), Palermo: Sellerio, 1997, ISBN 978-88-389-1255-9
- A History of Byzantine Literature (vol. I with Lee E. Sherry and Christine Angelidi, vol. II ed. Christine Angelidi), 2 vols., Athens: National Hellenic Research Foundation, 1999–2006 (vol. I, vol. II).

=== Articles and book chapters ===
- "Византийское сельское поселение", Византийский временник 27 (1949), pp. 215–244.
- "Крестьянские движения в Византии в X в. и аграрная политика императоров Македонской династии", Византийский временник 30 (1952), pp. 73–98.
- "О некоторых спорных вопросах истории становления феодальных отношений в Римской империи", Вестник древней истории 45 (1953), pp. 77–106.
- "Византийские города в VII–XI веках", Советская археология 21 (1954), pp. 164–88.
- "Формирование феодального поместья в Византии X в.", Византийский временник 36 (1956), pp. 98–122.
- "Экскуссия и экскуссаты в Византии X–XII вв.", in Византийские очерки, ed. M. Tikhomirov, Moskva: Akademiya Nauk SSSR, 1961, pp. 186–216.
- "Отношения Древней Руси и Византии в XI – первой половине XIII в." (with G.G. Litavrin and Z.V. Udaltsova), in Proceedings of the XIIIth International Congress of Byzantine Studies (Oxford, 5–10 September 1966), ed. J.M. Hussey, D. Obolensky, S. Runciman, London: Oxford University Press, 1967, pp. 69–91.
- "Из экономической жизни Византии XI–XII вв. Натуральное и денежное хозяйство", in Византийские очерки. Труды советских ученых к XIV конгрессу византинистов, ed. Z.V. Udaltsova and A.P. Kazhdan, Мoskva: Nauka, 1971, pp. 169–212.
- "L'Histoire de Cantacuzène en tant qu'oeuvre littéraire", Byzantion 50 (1980), pp. 279–335, JSTOR 44170619.
- "Continuity and Discontinuity in Byzantine History" (with Anthony Cutler), Byzantion 52 (1982), pp. 429–78, JSTOR 44170771.
- "The Armenians in the Byzantine Ruling Class, Predominantly in the Ninth through Twelfth Centuries", in Medieval Armenian Culture, ed. T.J. Samuelian and M.E. Stone, Chico, CA: Scholars Press, 1984, pp. 439–451.
- "Do We Need a New History of Byzantine Law?", Jahrbuch der Österreichischen Byzantinistik 39 (1989), pp. 1–28.
- "State, Feudal, and Private Economy in Byzantium", Dumbarton Oaks Papers 47 (1993), pp. 83–100, JSTOR 1291672.
- "Pronoia: The History of a Scholarly Discussion", Mediterranean Historical Review 10 (1995), pp. 133–163, doi:10.1080/09518969508569689.
- "The Peasantry", in The Byzantines, ed. G. Cavallo, Chicago: University of Chicago Press, 1997, pp. 43–73, ISBN 0-226-09791-9.
- "Polis and kastron in Theophanes and in Some Other Historical Texts", in Ευψυχία. Mélanges offerts à Hélène Ahrweiler, ed. M. Balard et al., Paris: Publications de la Sorbonne, 1998, vol. II, pp. 345–360, ISBN 978-2-85944-344-3.

== Bibliography ==
- Cutler, Anthony (1992), "Some Talk of Alexander", Dumbarton Oaks Papers, 46: 1–4, ISSN 0070-7546, JSTOR 1291634
- Franklin, Simon (1992), "Bibliography of Works by Alexander Kazhdan", Dumbarton Oaks Papers, 46: 5–26, ISSN 0070-7546, JSTOR 1291635
- Laiou, Angeliki E.; Talbot, Alice-Mary (1997), "Alexander Petrovich Kazhdan, 1922–1997", Dumbarton Oaks Papers, 51: xii–xvii, JSTOR 1291758
- Poliakovskaya, Margarita A. (1999), "Александр Петрович Каждан" (PDF), Византийский временник, 83: 304–306
