= Lydia Dan =

Russian revolutionary (1878–1963)

Lydia Osipovna Dan
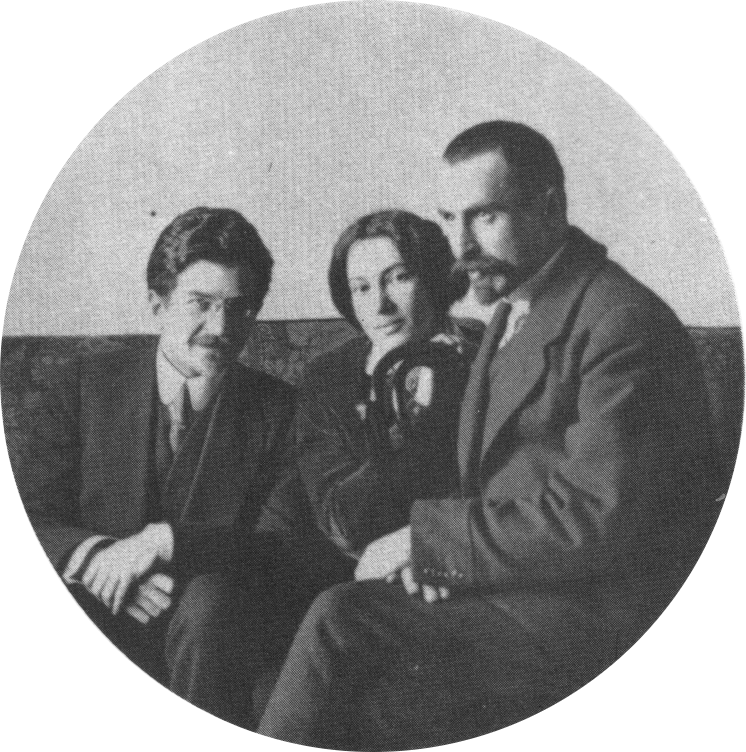
- Lydia Dan (centered), with Semyon Vainshtein (left) and Irakli Tsereteli (right) in Irkutsk (1914–1915)
- Born: Lydia Osipovna Tsederbaum; May 21, 1878. Odessa, Russian Empire
- Died: March 28, 1963 (aged 84); New York City, U.S.
- Occupation: Revolutionary
- Political party: RSDLP (Mensheviks)
- Spouse: Fyodor Dan
- Relatives: Julius Martov

Lydia Osipovna Dan (Russian: Ли́дия О́сиповна Дан; née Tsederbaum; (Note: Russian: Цедерба́ум.) 21 May 1878 – 28 March 1963) was a Russian Menshevik revolutionary leader and active participant in the revolutionary movement.

Her brother was the Menshevik leader Julius Martov, and her husband was fellow Menshevik Fyodor Dan.

== Biography ==
=== Early life ===
Dan was born to a middle-class, educated, and politically aware Jewish family in Odessa in 1878. Her brother was fellow Menshevik leader Julius Martov.

She entered the Russian Social Democratic Labour Party in the mid-1890s, and was a member of the first social-democratic circles in St. Petersburg.

=== Political life ===
Lydia Dan was attracted to Marxism by its appeal as a "path of reason", as she called it, which could guide mankind to civilisation, enlightenment, and modernity. She also felt drawn to it by its:

...sociological and economic optimism, its strong belief, buttressed by facts and figures, that the development of the economy, the development of capitalism, by demoralising and eroding the foundations of the old society, was creating new social forces (including us) which would certainly sweep away the autocratic regime together with its abominations.

She also noted that youths like her were drawn to it because of its "European nature", breaking with the provincialism of Russian society, holding "out a promise that we would not stay a semi-Asiatic country, but would become a part of the West with its culture, institutions, and attributes of free political system. The West was our guiding light."

During the famine of 1891, Lydia Dan called the co-operation between the Neo-Populists and the Marxists "a new era", believing it to be a landmark of the revolution as it showed her generation "that the Russian system was completely bankrupt. It felt as though Russia was on the brink of something".

Dan was critical of Lenin and other Marxists, dubbed "Politicals", who wanted to organise a centralised party and use it for political ends. She would later write that "many of us associated such a party with what the People's Will had been". On the writing of Lenin's political pamphlet, What Is To Be Done?, Dan recalled: "None of us could imagine that there could be a party that might arrest its own members. There was the thought or the certainty that if a party was truly centralised, each member would submit naturally to the instructions or directives."

During the Second Party Congress of the Social Democratic Party, which saw the split of the party into the Menshevik and Bolshevik factions, Dan came to side with her brother Martov, not because of his abilities or because she believed he was right on the issue, but because she felt Martov was noble, having "an inexhaustible charm", although "poorly suited to be a leader"; writing further, she admitted, "it was very tragic to have to say that all my sympathies for Lenin (which were considerable) were based upon misunderstanding". Early in the conference, she had also noted that the relation between Martov and Lenin had become colder than it was in Munich. Despite her disagreements with Lenin, she still believed that the "Economists" were a greater enemy than the Bolsheviks.

After losing her first job, she got a job in a company owned by the Bundist American millionaire S. S. Atran.

She acted as the godmother of Yuri Larin in the “incongruous baptism … undertaken in a tsarist prison so that Larin could have an Orthodox marriage entitling him to take his bride into exile”.

=== Exile and later life ===
She went in exile in 1922, and later wrote her memoirs.

She died in New York City in 1963.

== Bibliography ==
- Figes, Orlando (2014). A People's Tragedy: The Russian Revolution 1891–1924. London: The Bodley Head. ISBN 9781847922915.
- Garcia, Ziva Galili y; Wortman, Richard (1987). The Making of Three Russian Revolutionaries. Cambridge University Press. ISBN 978-0-521-26325-2.
- Liebich, André (1997). From the Other Shore: Russian Social Democracy After 1921, vol. 5. Cambridge, Massachusetts & London, England: Harvard University Press. ISBN 9780674325173.
