= Sergei Skazkin =

Soviet historian (1890-1973)

- Born: 19 October 1890, 7 October 1890 (in Julian calendar); Novocherkassk
- Died: 14 April 1973 (aged 82); Moscow
- Occupation: Historian, medievalist and academic

Sergei Danilovich Skazkin (Russian: Сергей Данилович Сказкин; 19 October 1890 – 14 April 1973) was a Soviet historian, Academician of the Academy of Sciences of the Soviet Union (since 1958). Doctor of Sciences in Historical Sciences (1935).

Skazkin graduated from Moscow State University (MSU) in 1915 and began teaching at the university in 1920. In 1935, he became Professor of the Faculty of History, and from 1949 he was Head of the Department of Medieval History. He succeeded Eugene Kosminsky.

In addition to research at MSU, Skazkin also performed research at the Institute of History of the USSR. In 1961, he headed its section of Medieval History, Institute of History, and Academy of Sciences of the Soviet Union. After the institute's division in 1968, Skazkin headed the same sections at the Institute of History, Academy of Sciences of the Soviet Union.
