= Yuri Larin =

Soviet economist and politician

- Юрий Ларин
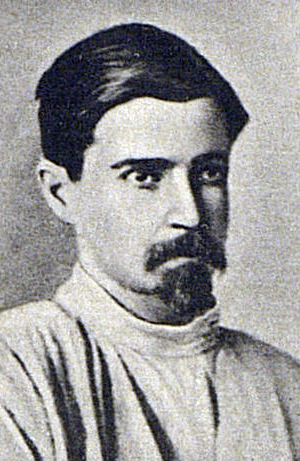
- Larin in 1906

Personal details
- Born: Mikhail Lurye; 17 June 1882 Simferopol, Russian Empire
- Died: 14 January 1932 (aged 49) Moscow, Russian SFSR, Soviet Union
- Resting place: Kremlin Wall Necropolis
- Citizenship: Russian Empire, Soviet Union
- Party: RSDLP (1900–1932)
- Occupation: Economist

Yuri Mikhailovich Larin (Russian: Юрий Михайлович Ларин, pseudonym of Mikhail Aleksandrovich Larin (Russian: Михаил Александрович Ларин), born Lurye (Russian: Лурье); 17 June 1882 – 14 January 1932) was a Soviet economist and politician.

== Early life ==
Born in to a middle-class intellectual Jewish family, Larin was brought up in Crimea by his mother, Friderika Granat, sister of Ignaty Granat, one of the founders of the Granat Encyclopedic Dictionary, and other members of the Granat family. She had contracted scarlet fever while she was pregnant, which is the probable cause of the muscular dystrophy which Larin contracted at the age of nine, which left him partly crippled for life.

His father, Shneur Zalman Lurie, was an engineer, Hebrew author and Zionist. He abandoned his wife while she was pregnant and ill, and later divorced her.

Larin joined the Russian Social Democratic Labour Party (RSDLP) in Simferopol in 1900. He moved to Odesa and organised a student Marxist group, but was arrested and sent back to Crimea. There he resumed his revolutionary activity, and was arrested in 1903 and sentenced to eight years exile in Yakutia. He escaped in 1904, but because of the difficulty he had walking, he was carried in a laundry basket by other exiles involved in the escape.

He emigrated to Geneva and, following the split in the RSDLP, joined the Mensheviks. He took his revolutionary pseudonym, Larin, from a character in Eugene Onegin by Pushkin.

Larin returned to Russia early in the 1905 Revolution, and was arrested, but escaped to Ukraine, where he tried to reunite the two halves of the RSDLP. Arrested again, he escaped to Baku, before emigrating to Germany.

His wife, Lena, was a Menshevik from 1907. She was arrested in 1911, and held in Butyrka prison. At their marriage ceremony, another Menshevik Lydia Dan acted as Larin's godmother in the “incongruous baptism ... undertaken in a tsarist prison so that [he] could have an Orthodox marriage entitling him to take his bride into exile”.

In 1914, the couple adopted Lena's orphaned niece, Anna Larina.

In 1910, Larin wrote a series of articles arguing that Russia was progressing towards becoming a capitalist society in which an elected Duma would become increasingly powerful, and that it would not be necessary to repeat the revolutionary violence of 1905. This was angrily refuted by Vladimir Lenin the Bolshevik leader, who described Larin as the "enfant terrible of opportunism."

After the outbreak of war, in 1914, Larin was deported from Germany, and settled in Stockholm. In 1915, he wrote a series of articles for the Moscow daily Russkia vedomosti about the Germany war economy, which, he said, "has given the world a pattern of the centralised direction of the national economy as a single machine."

== Career from 1917 ==
After the February Revolution, in 1917, he returned to Russia and was one of the first eminent Mensheviks to switch to the Bolsheviks. After the Bolsheviks had seized power, on 7 November, he was appointed head of the legislation bureau in the new government, but he resigned on 17 November in protest at the failure to form a coalition with other socialist parties.

In December 1917, in recognition of his knowledge of the German war economy, he was appointed a founding member of the Supreme Soviet of the National Economy (Vesenkha). He drafted the decree in March 1918 which laid out the management structure of nationalised industries. He was also the author of imaginative schemes for opening trade relations with the US, electrification of Petrograd's factories, developing the Kuznetsk coal industry and irrigating Turkestan to grow cotton. Some of these ideas were developed later, but dismissed as impractical under conditions prevailing during the Russian Civil War. Delivering his political report to 11th party congress of the Russian Communist Party (RCP), in March 1922, Lenin remarked:

He is a very capable man and has a vivid imagination. ... Imagination is a very valuable asset; but Comrade Larin has a little too much of it. I would say, for example, that if Comrade Larin’s stock of imagination were divided equally among all the members of the R.C.P., there would be very good results. But until we can perform this operation, Comrade Larin must be kept away from state, administrative, planning, and economic affairs.

In January 1922, Larin was seconded to the newly opened Soviet embassy in London, where the ambassador, Leonid Krasin was urged by Lenin to keep him in London "as long as possible", take care of his health and give "a long, literary job" to do. "If you take any of his statistics on trust," Lenin added, "we'll sack you."

Larin returned to Russia in 1923, and worked as a writer and economist. During the split in the communist party that followed Lenin's death, Larin was an outspoken critic of Leon Trotsky and the left opposition, who, he claimed, had little or no support from industrial workers. But in some respects he was more 'left' that the Left Opposition, on agrarian and national issues. He proposed that all kulaks should be disenfranchised, and rural taxes increased by 20 per cent. He also was an obstinate critic of alleged discrimination of Russians in the Ukrainian Soviet Republic.

== Jewish questions ==
Larin was one of the few leading Bolsheviks who showed an interest in Jewish questions (though people from Jewish backgrounds were over-represented among the Old Bolsheviks, for many a sense internationalism often overrode any particular association with Jewish identity or community in their political work). As head of OZET, the Society for Settling Toiling Jews on the Land, he supported the creation of Jewish agricultural settlements in Crimea, which were tolerated in the 1920s but later suppressed. An area of Crimea with Jewish settlements was named Larindorf after him. In 1931, he criticised the decision to create the Jewish autonomous area of Birobidzhan as unrealistic for which he was severely censored.

== Five-day week ==
In May 1929, speaking at the Congress of Soviets, Larin proposed that to increase industrial output, normal weekends should be abolished and replaced by a 'continuous work week', in which workers would have every fifth day off, but in shifts, so that there was never a day when the factories were not fully operating. The experiment was launched across the Soviet Union in August 1929, but abandoned in 1940.

== Personality ==
Arthur Ransome, working as a correspondent for the Manchester Guardian, met Larin in 1920 and was impressed by his "obstinacy, his hatred of compromise, and [his] sort of mixed originality and perverseness" and "the real heroism with which he conquers physical disabilities which long ago would have overwhelmed a less unbreakable spirit." The Menshevik Simon Liberman described Larin as:

He was a very tall man, with regular features, large black eyes, and a little pointed beard. He had been crippled by infantile paralysis, now had difficulty in moving his legs and left arm, and his chest was sunken in and his shoulders protruded sharply forward; I could feel tension in every step he took ... Larin flourished in 1918 and 1919, during the era of passionate enthusiasm for a complete overhauling of Russian economy ... But Larin's star did not shine for long. The contrasts between his fantasies and life's realities was working against him.

== Death ==
Larin died in Moscow on 14 January 1932, aged 49. His body was cremated and the ashes were buried at the Kremlin Wall.

His widow Lena Larina was arrested during the Great Purge, in January 1938, and spent 17 years in prison and exile. Her health was broken by the experience, and she was mostly bed-ridden from her 'rehabilitation' in 1955 until her death, in 1973.
