= Aleksandr Neusykhin =

Soviet medievalist (1898–1969)

- Born: 19 January 1898; Moscow
- Died: 22 October 1969 (aged 71); Moscow
- Employer: Institute of History of the Soviet Academy of Sciences; Moscow Industrial Pedagogical Institute; Moscow Institute of Philosophy, Literature, and History; Marx–Engels–Lenin Institute
- Awards: Order of the Red Banner of Labour; Medal "For Valiant Labour in the Great Patriotic War 1941–1945"; Medal "In Commemoration of the 800th Anniversary of Moscow"

Aleksandr Iosifovich Neusykhin (Russian: Александр Иосифович Неусыхин; 19 January 1898 – 22 October 1969) was a Soviet historian and medievalist, Doctor of Sciences in Historical Sciences (1946), Professor at the Lomonosov Moscow State University. He headed the department of history at the Tomsk State Pedagogical University.

Neusykhin graduated from Moscow State University (MSU) in 1921. He was a student of Dmitry Petrushevsky. Neusykhin published his first article in 1922.

In 1938, he received the title of Professor. In 1946, he defended his doctoral dissertation.

From 1942 to 1943, Neusykhin headed the Department of History of the Middle Ages at the MSU.

His student was Aron Gurevich.

== Awards and honours ==
- Medal "For Valiant Labour in the Great Patriotic War 1941–1945" (1946)
- Medal "In Commemoration of the 800th Anniversary of Moscow" (1948)
- Order of the Red Banner of Labour (1954)
