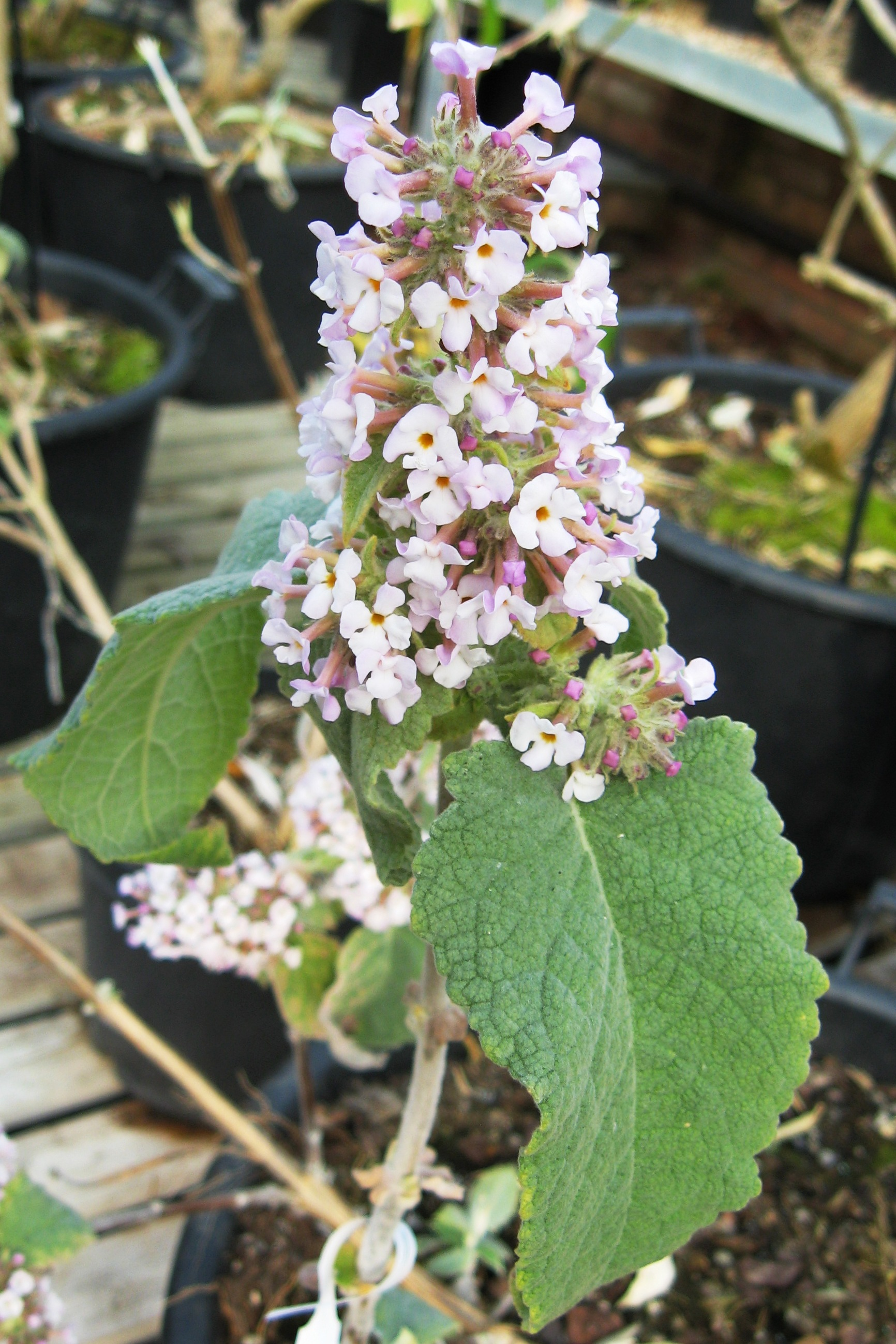

Scientific classification
- Kingdom: Plantae
- Clade: Tracheophytes
- Clade: Angiosperms
- Clade: Eudicots
- Clade: Asterids
- Order: Lamiales
- Family: Scrophulariaceae
- Genus: Buddleja
- Species: B. tibetica

Binomial name
- Buddleja tibetica W. W. Sm.

Synonyms
- Buddleja crispa Benth.; Buddleja hastata Prain, ex. C. Marquand

= Buddleja tibetica =

Species of plant

Buddleja tibetica was a species sunk as Buddleja crispa by Leeuwenberg in 1979, and treated as such in the subsequent Flora of China; however, the plant remains widely known by its former epithet in horticulture.

The xerophytic shrub was discovered and collected in 1904 in the Llalung Valley (altitude 3,300 m), Tibet, by Captain Herbert Walton I. M. S., Medical Officer and Naturalist to the Tibet Frontier Commission, whilst travelling from Sikkim to Lhasa on the British expedition to Tibet. The shrub was introduced to the UK by Lord Wigram, who received it from the Lloyd Botanic Garden in Darjeeling as Buddleja hastata Prain, ex C. Marquand in 1931.

== Description ==
Buddleja tibetica is a deciduous shrub of very sparse habit, growing to < 3 m high, more in diameter. The flowers appear before the leaves at the nodes of the previous year's growth, during March in the UK. The faintly scented flowers form compact sessile or subsessile clusters, initially dark purple, they rapidly turn pale on opening, ultimately becoming white. The distinctive leaves are < 10 cm long, and broadly lanceolate, though there is considerable variation in both size and shape; the upper surface covered with a tomentum which persists for several months, bestowing a greyish-white bloom.

== Cultivation ==
Lord Wigram grew his plant in his moat garden at Windsor Castle, and it is from this plant that all the other known specimens in the UK were derived. Still very rare in cultivation, the shrub was propagated in 2007 by Peter Moore of the Longstock Park Nursery, NCCPG National Collection holders, near Stockbridge in Hampshire. The seed is infertile, and cuttings are difficult to strike; hardwood cuttings can occasionally be rooted in 100% perlite, and softwood cuttings can be struck in June under mist. Hardiness: USDA zones 8–9.

== Notable plants ==
The oldest and largest specimen in cultivation is to be found in one of the outer gardens of the Royal Botanic Garden Edinburgh. Grown from a cutting from the specimen at Crathes Castle in 1942, its longevity has been attributed to the comparatively dry climate of Edinburgh (average rainfall 676 mm per annum, compared with 1650 mm for Scotland as a whole), and location against a wall.

== Literature ==
- Bean, W. J. (1970). Trees & Shrubs Hardy in the British Isles, 8th ed., Vol. 1.. (2nd impression 1976) London
- Hillier & Sons. (1990). Hillier's Manual of Trees & Shrubs, 5th ed.. David & Charles, Newton Abbot.
