= William Frederick Travers O'Connor =

Irish diplomat and army officer

Sir Sir William O'Connor CIE CSI CVO
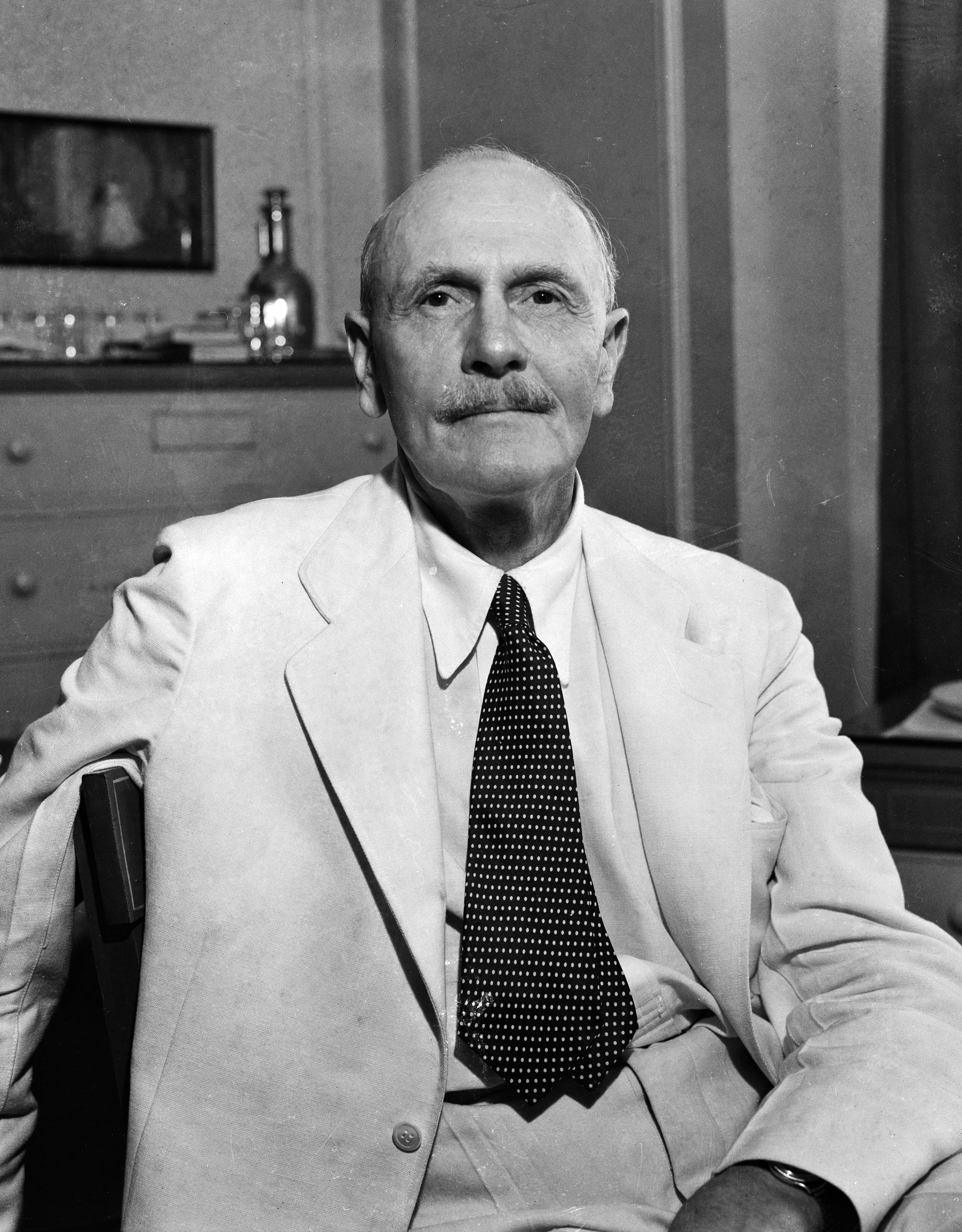
- Born: William Frederick Travers O'Connor; 30 July 1870; Longford, Ireland
- Died: 14 December 1943 (aged 73); Chelsea, London
- Burial place: St Luke's Church Office, Headley Road, Grayshott, Hindhead, GU26 6LF
- Military career
- Allegiance: United Kingdom
- Branch: British Army; Indian Army
- Service years: 1890–1925
- Rank: Lieutenant-Colonel
- Unit: Royal Artillery
- Conflicts: Tirah Campaign, British expedition to Tibet, World War I
- Awards: Order of the Indian Empire, Royal Victorian Order, The Most Exalted Order of the Star of India, Knight Bachelor

Signature
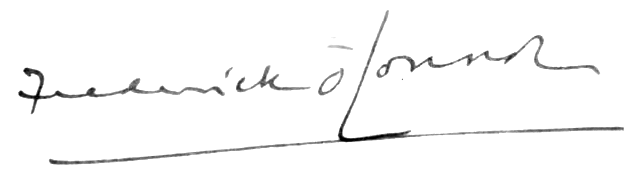

Lieutenant-Colonel Sir William Frederick Travers O'Connor CSI CIE CVO (30 July 1870 – 14 December 1943) was an Irish diplomat and officer in the British and British Indian armies. He is remembered for his travels in Asia, cartography, study and publication of local cultures and language, his actions on the Younghusband expedition to Tibet, Royal Geographical Society council member, member of the Royal Automobile Club and for his work negotiating and signing the Nepal–Britain Treaty of 1923.

== Early life ==
O'Connor was born in 1870, Longford, Ireland, son of land agent Matthew Weld O'Connor, and Harriet Georgina, daughter of Anthony O'Reilly, of Baltrasna, County Meath. He had a sister, Lina O'Connor, and two younger brothers Matthew O'Connor and Myles O'Connor. He was educated at Charterhouse School as a Junior Scholar, in Verites house, 1884-1887. Member of Charterhouse shooting team in 1885, and placing 7th, winning the House Shooting Cup in 1885.

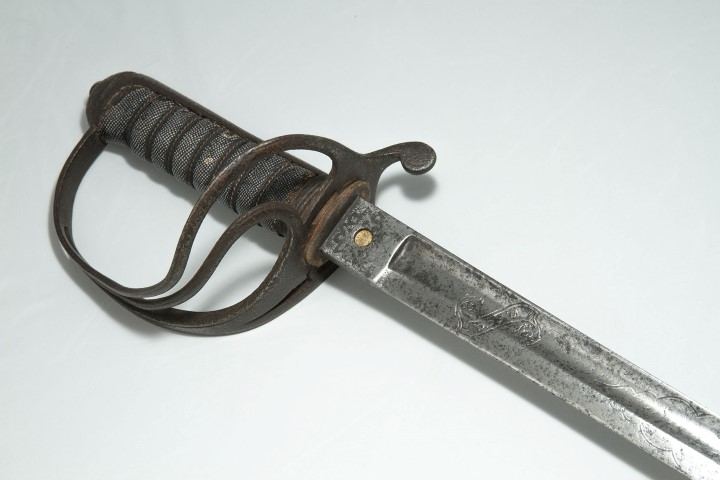
Wilkinson 1821 pattern sabre, serial number 29781 made in 1889, etched with W.F.T.O'C. initials.

He passed through the Royal Military Academy in 1888 and was gazetted to the Royal Artillery in 1890. He received Henry Wilkinson sabre (number 29781) in 1889, as gift from a family member.

== Military career ==
14 February 1890 – Joined 14th Field Academy Royal Artillery at Shorncliffe as second lieutenant.

14 February 1893 – Promoted to lieutenant.

1894 – Served in Indian mountain battery stationed near Darjeeling.

1897–98 – Employed in the Swat valley and Tirah Campaigns, patrolling the Kurrum Valley. Awarded medal and 3 clasps.

1 October 1899 – Promoted to captain.

1899–1903 – Appointed inspecting officer of the Kashmir Imperial Service Troops, stationed at Gilgit near the border of Afghanistan and Chinese Turkmenistan.

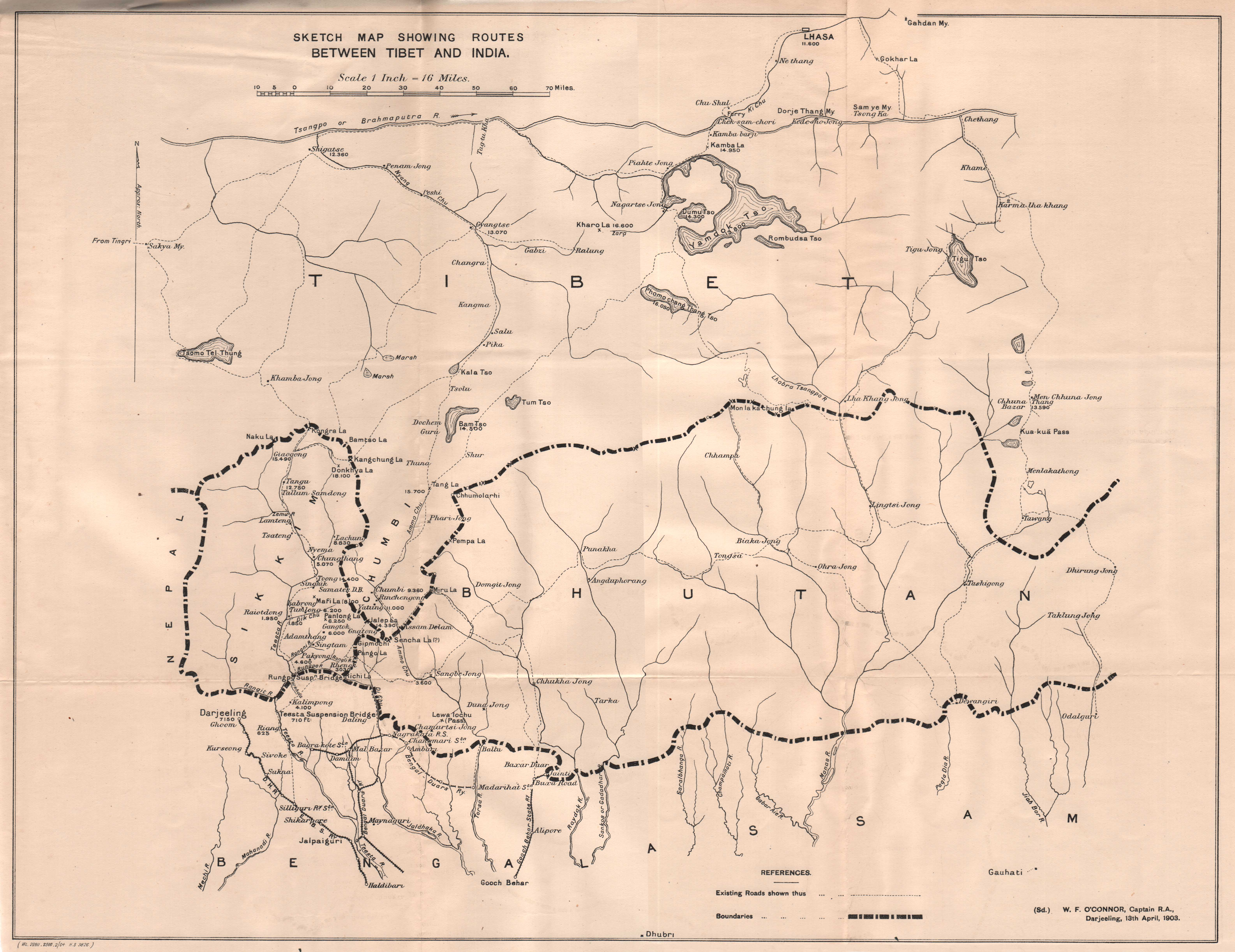
1903-04-13 Routes between Tibet and India by Captain W. F. O'Connor, Royal Artillery

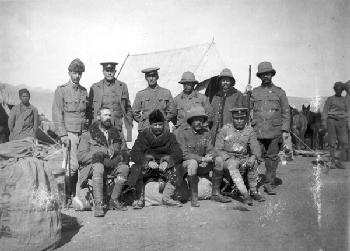
Younghusband team in 1904, O'Connor standing second from left

11 December 1903 – Departed Sikkim as interpreter, secretary and chief intelligence officer to Sir Francis Younghusband's Lhasa mission as part of British expedition to Tibet. Awarded medal and clasp.

1904 – Employed former Sengchen Lama's personal attendant Sherab Gyatso to be his personal language teacher and suspected intelligence informant.

21 May 1904 - Fought, and wounded, in battle to capture village of Pala. David (born Dorje) MacDonald briefly took over O'Connor's interpreter duties during recovery.

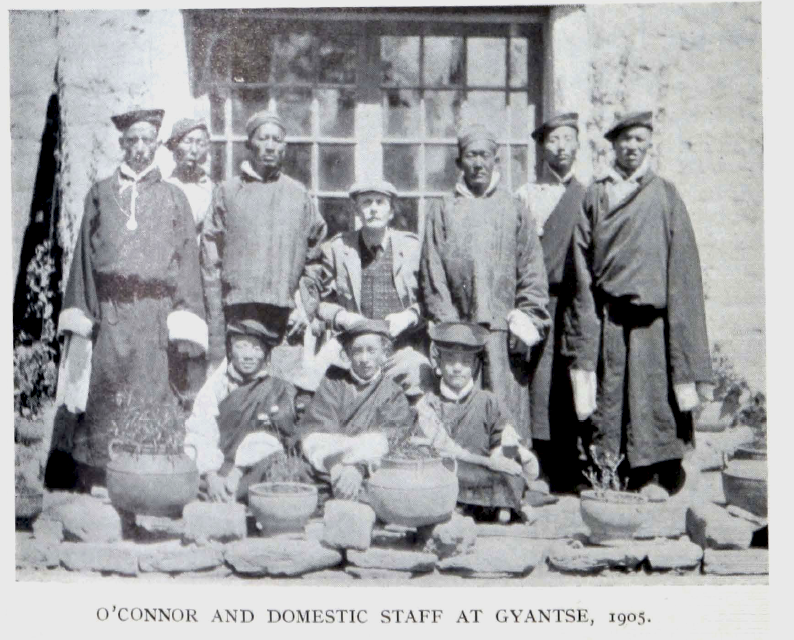
O'Connor and domestic staff at Gyantse in 1905

1905 – Posted as the first British Trade Agent at the new Trade Mart in Gyantse, under the Anglo-Tibet Convention.

May 1905 – Investigated theft of remains of Younghusband mission money from boxes left at Gyantse.

Summer 1906 – Stayed with Gertrude Bell whilst she worked on her travel book The Desert and the Sown.

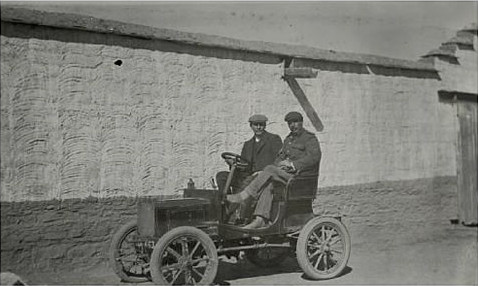
Frederick O'Connor (representative of English Trade in Tibet for British Raj, and secretary of Younghusband) and Thubten Chokyi Nyima, 9th Panchen Lama, in a Peugeot car, one of the two first in Tibet, in 1907

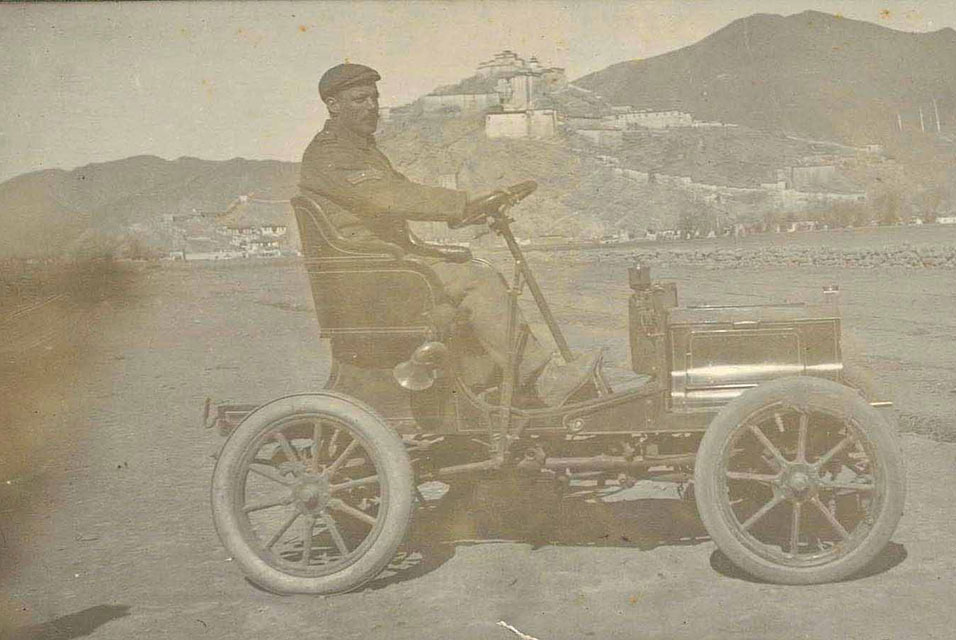
Peugeot in front of the Gyantse fortress in Freddie 1907

1907 – Import of two motor cars, by carrying over the Himalayas, into Tibet. One was an 8hp Clement brought as a gift for Thubten Choekyi Nyima, the 9th Panchen Lama, who presided over Tashi Lhunpo monastery near Shigatse. The other was his own 6.5hp Baby Peugeot (Peugeot Type 69).

1908 – Accompanied Sikkimese Prince on world tour and also to meet 13th Dalai Lama. O'Connor was the first Indian Government official to meet the Dalai Lama.

14 February 1908 – Promoted to major.

30 September 1909 – Appointed His Majesty's council for the districts of Seistan and Kain.

1910 – Serving in Mashad as Consul-General and Agent to the Governor-General.

1912 – Transferred to Shiraz, capital province of Fars, as Consul.

28 October 1913 – Met with the Edwin Montagu, Under-Secretary of State for India, at lunch arranged by Gertrude Bell, for 1.5 hour briefing and questions on the status of the frontier.

November 1915 – Taken captive by Persian army

14 February 1916 - Promoted to lieutenant-colonel.

August 1916 – Released from Persian captivity as part of prisoner exchange.

1918 – Met with Lord Beaverbrook, the Minister of Information and sent to Siberia to further the cause of the Allies and their friends amongst the Russians.

9 April 1918 – Sailed from the Liverpool to New York on board the SS Carpathia., taking 11 days, to meet with senior military and diplomats regarding the US policy in Siberia.

3 June 1918 – Arrived in to Vladivostok and served as Resident.

January 1921 – Appointed political officer at Gangtok.

March 1921 – Left position in Gangtok and returned to England, when mother fell seriously ill.

21 December 1921 – Signed Nepal Nepal–Britain Treaty of 1923 as British Envoy at the Court of Nepal.

1925 – Retired from military service.

== Distinctions ==
- The Most Eminent Order of the Indian Empire, Companion (CIE), 1904
- Royal Victorian Order, Commander (CVO), 1922
- The Most Exalted Order of the Star of India, Companion (CSI), 1924
- Knight Bachelor, 1925 Birthday Honours

== Later life ==
2 February 1930 - Article in Detroit Free Press newspaper showing O'Connor leading tiger hunt in India.

28 June 1931 – Article in The Indianapolis Sunday Star newspaper saying O'Connor inviting 5 Americans on tiger hunt for $100,000 ($20,000 each).

30 June 1931 – Bankruptcy petition filed.

29 July 1931 – Receiving Order issued on a creditor's petition.

11:00 12 August 1931 – Date First Bankruptcy Meeting.

30 October 1931 – Date of bankruptcy public examination.

13 Jul 1932 – Arrived in Southampton from New York on the RMS Berengaria. 16 July 1934 – Crossed border from Canada to Seattle, to go to L.A. and tour the US.

27 November 1938 – The Old House performed by John McCormack at the Royal Albert Hall in London.

November 1939 – The Old House recorded by John McCormack.

14 December 1943 – Death, Chelsea.

17 December 1943 – Funeral, St Luke's Church Office, Headley Road, Grayshott, Hindhead, GU26 6LF

== Works ==
- Routes in Sikkim, 1900.
- Report on Tibet, 1903.
- Rules for the Phonetic Transcription into English of Tibetan Words, with Charles Alfred Bell,1904
- Lhasa: an account of the country and people of Central Tibet, with Perceval Landon and Herbert James Walton, 1905.
- Folk Tales from Tibet with Illustrations by a Tibetan Artist and Some Verses from Tibetan Love Songs, 1906.
- On the frontier and beyond: a record of thirty years' service, 1931
- Wrote music and lyrics to The Old House, Quietide and One Hundred Years Ago, 1937.
- Things mortal, 1940.
