= Kampa Dzong =

Town in Tibet

Coordinates: 28.2803°N 88.522°E

Kampa Kampa Dzong
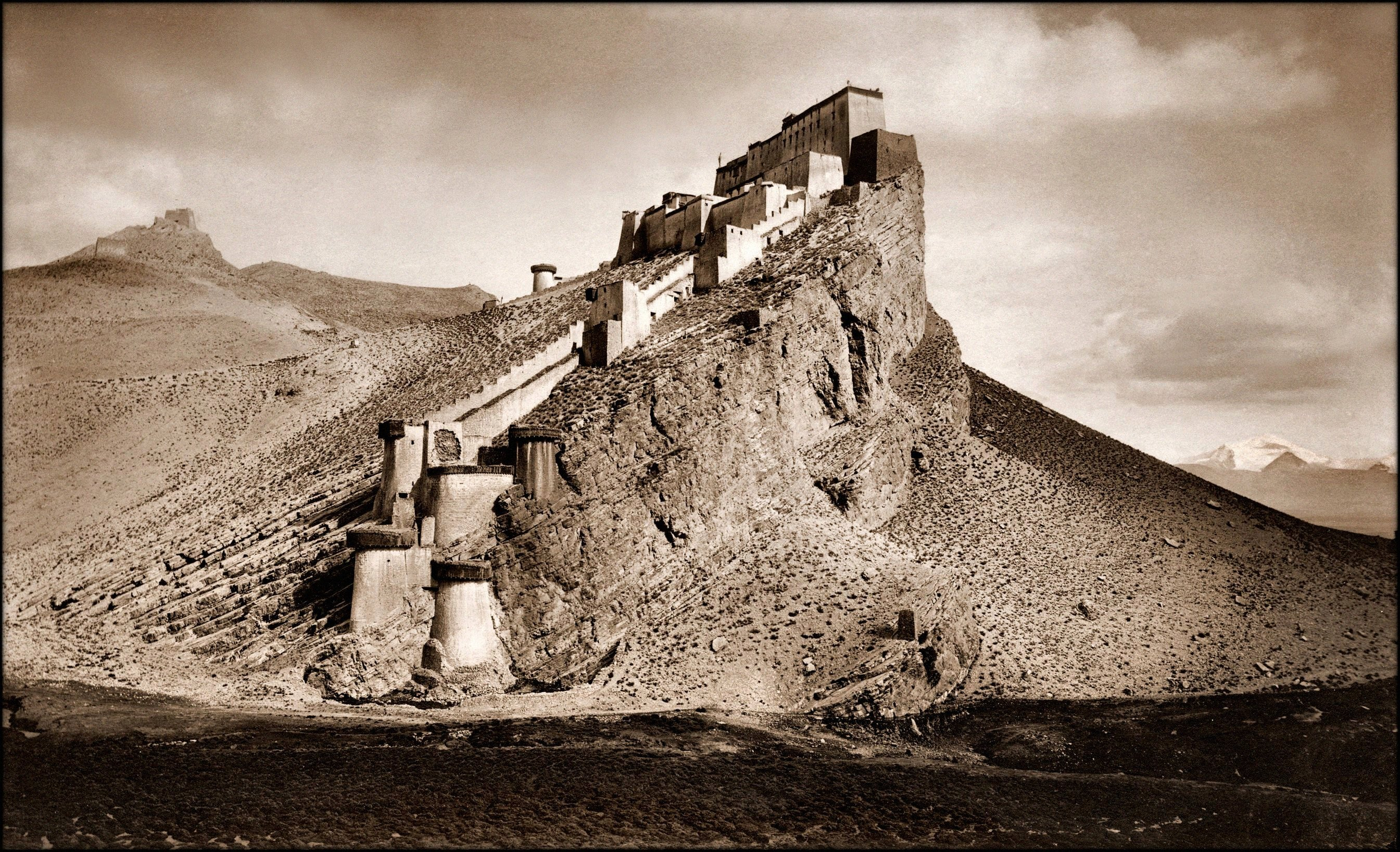
- Kampa Dzong, Tibet 1904
- Interactive map of Kampa

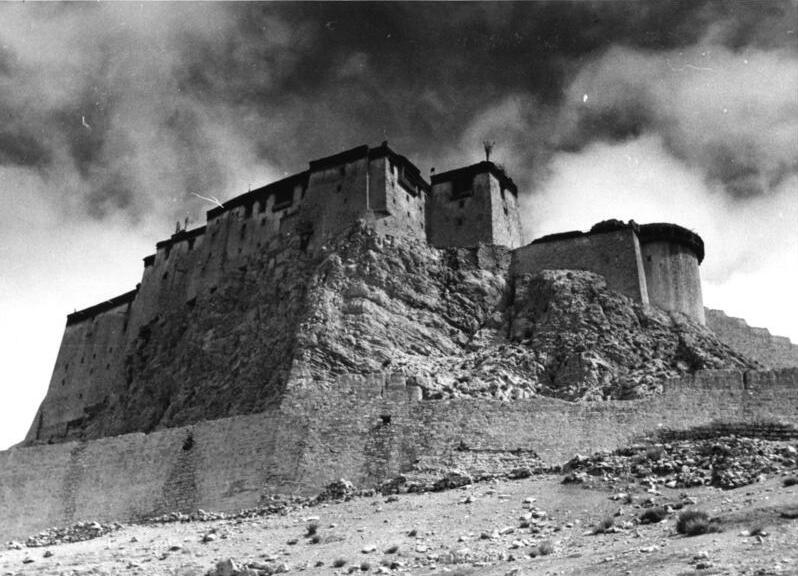
Kampa Dzong, 1938

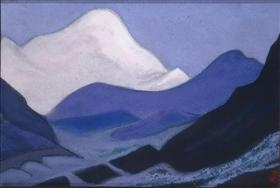
Russian artist Nicholas Roerich's 1938 painting of Kampa Dzong

Kampa or Kamba Dzong, (Note: The variations Khampa and Khamba are also found, typically in the literature on the Younghusband expedition and its aftermath.) (Gampa Dzong in Standard Tibetan, (Note: Tibetan: གམ་པ་རྫོང, Wylie: gam pa rdzong, THL: gam pa dzong, ZWPY: Kamba Zong.) and Gangba Xian in Chinese) (Note: Chinese: 岗巴县; pinyin: Gǎng bā xiàn,) is a Tibetan town north of Sikkim. It is the headequarters Kamba County in the Shigatse Prefecture. It is marked by an iconic hill-top fort, much admired by the expeditions travelling to Mount Everest during the early 20th century. It also used to be a border trading post for Sikkimese traders from North Sikkim, prior to the Chinese annexation of Tibet.

== History ==
Traditional Tibetan carpet making is thought to have originated in Kampa Dzong.

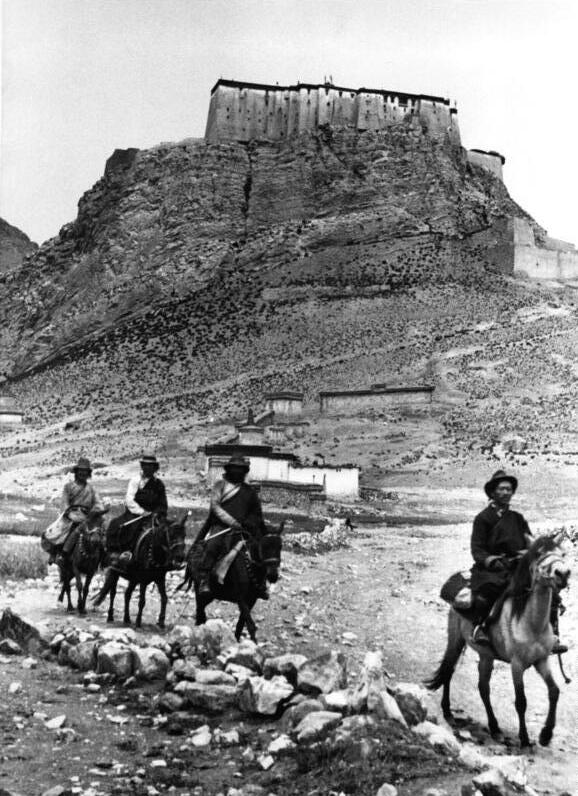
Ernst Schäfer 1938 Tibetexpedition, Reiter, Burg Kampa Dzong

In June 1903, Colonel Francis Younghusband, serving as British commissioner to Tibet, led a diplomatic mission consisting of five officers and five hundred troops to Kampa Dzong. The objective of the mission was to meet Chinese and Tibetan representatives and discuss mutual non-aggression and trade agreements. After being kept waiting for five months before the Chinese and Tibetan representatives arrived, the mission was recalled.

== Sino-Indian relations ==
The Sino-Indian border along the Sikkim is well-defined by the 1890 Convention of Calcutta signed by Britain and China. Despite this, frenetic construction of border infrastructure and troop deployment has been witnessed along the border. During the 2020–2021 China–India skirmishes, one of the first clashes was reported at the Naku La pass, where a scuffle broke out between the Chinese and Indian forces, resulting in injuries to eleven soldiers. During the 12th round of disengagement talks, the commanders of the two sides agreed to establish a hotline between the PLA base at Kampa Dzong and the Indian Army base at Kongra La. It was meant to enhance ties between the two armies and maintain peace and tranquility along the border.

== Bibliography ==
- Bell, Charles (1924), Tibet Past and Present (First ed.), Oxford University Press
- French, Patrick (1994), Younghusband: the Last Great Imperial Adventurer, London: HarperCollins, ISBN 0-00-637601-0 – via archive.org
- Lamb, Alastair (1960), Britain and Chinese Central Asia, Routledge & Kegal Paul – via archive.org
- Powers, John; Holzinger, Lutz (2004), History as Propaganda: Tibetan Exiles Versus the People's Republic of China, Oxford University Press, USA, ISBN 978-0-19-517426-7
