= Government Mohindra College =

College in Punjab

Mohindra College, Patiala
- Type: College
- Established: 1875; 151 years ago
- Affiliations: Punjabi University
- Principal: Nishtha
- Faculty: 112+
- Location: Patiala, Punjab, India
- Campus: Urban, 21 acres/ 8.5 ha
- Website: govtmohindracollege.in

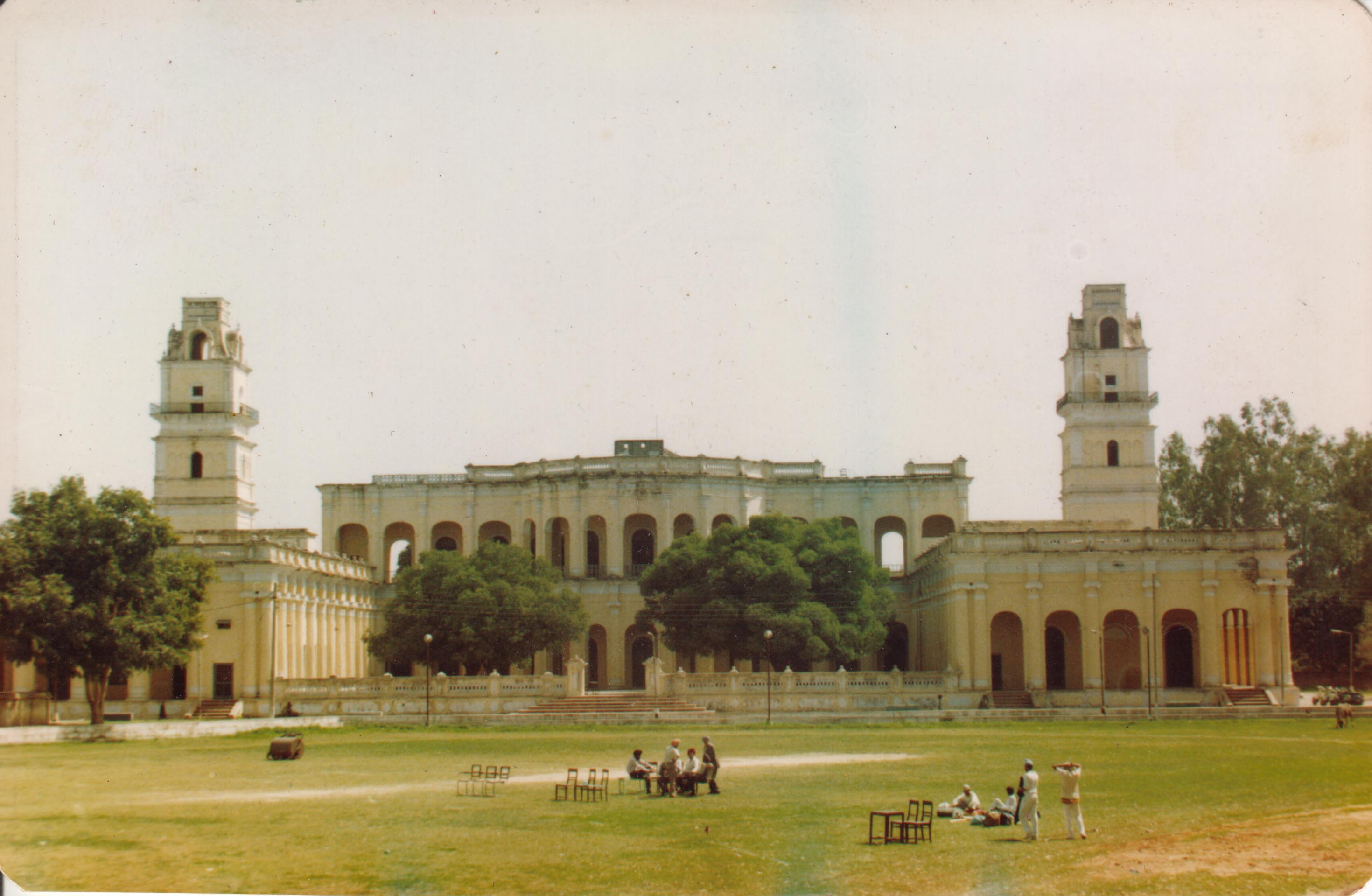
Mohindra College, Patiala

Government Mohindra College is a private university in Patiala, Punjab, India. Founded in 1875, is the oldest institution of contemporary higher learning in Northern India.

Mohindra College was the first institution in Punjab to receive A++ grade from the National Assessment and Accreditation Council of the Government of India. It has been ranked as number one college in India by the National Assessment and Accreditation Council in 2016 with highest CGPA of 3.86 which is highest in college section in India. The college offers undergraduate and graduate level education in basic sciences, political science, languages, history, public administration, commerce, computer applications, law, agriculture science, biotechnology, and medicine.

== Campus ==
The 21-acre (85,000 m^{2}) Mohindra College campus is outside the Patiala walled city opposite the National Institute of Sports, Patiala. The college facilities include the Central Library, the Computer Center, the Health Center, the girls hostel, an auditorium with a seating capacity of 600, a botanical garden, and sports infrastructure, particularly for cricket and swimming.

== History ==
Then Viceroy of India Lord Northbrook laid the foundation stone for the main building of the college in 1875. It was named after Maharaja Mahendra Singh of Patiala, (also spelled as Mohindar Singh) when he died suddenly in 1876. Mohindra College was initially affiliated to the University of Calcutta; at the time, Calcutta was the capital of British Raj.

In 1882 the University of Punjab was established in Lahore, and Mohindra College became one of its first affiliated colleges. Following the partition of India in 1947, the college came under purview of the Punjab University, Chandigarh and, in 1962, under the Punjabi University of Patiala.

Shri Atul Krishna Ghosh was the longest serving Principal and was instrumental in most of the early development works of this college. He served as a Professor of English with high credential. To make way for his British successor E Candler, Sri Ghosh was transferred to Muir College, Allahabad. He spent his last phase of his life in Allahabad, silently working for the freedom movement of India. The matter regarding his super-cession in Mohindra College, Patiala by Candler was even raised in the Parliament of the United Kingdom, the transcript of which is preserved in the British Library archive.

== Funding ==
Mohindra College is funded by the Punjab Government and the University Grants Commission (India) while the campus is maintained by the Public Works Department of the State Government.

The college offers financial assistance to the economically disadvantaged sections of society. Undergraduate tuition is exempt for girls. Women represent over half of the 200 member faculty while about a third of the faculty holds doctoral and post-doctoral credentials.

== In popular culture ==
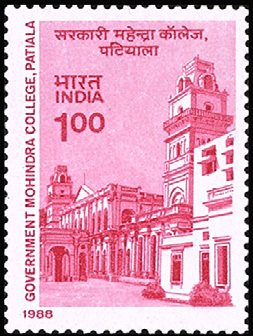
A commemorative postage stamp on Mohindra College

A commemorative postage stamp on Mohindra College, Patiala was issued by the Government of India on 14 March 1988.

Edmund Candler's novels, Siri Ram: Revolutionist and Abdication, are set partly in a college in the fictional town of Gandeshwar, which is most likely based on Mohindra College.
