= Alastair Lamb =

British historian of British Raj and South Asia (1930–2023)

Alastair Lamb FRAS FSA
- Born: 9 January 1930; Harbin, China
- Died: 15 March 2023 (aged 93)
- Awards: Fellow of the Royal Asiatic Society; Fellow of the Society of Antiquaries of London

Academic background
- Education: Harrow School
- Alma mater: University of Cambridge

Academic work
- Discipline: Archaeology; Diplomatic history Ethnography
- Institutions: University of Malaya; Australian National University; University of Ghana; Hatfield Polytechnic
- Main interests: Sino-Indian border dispute Kashmir conflict

Alastair Lamb FRAS FSA (1930–2023) was a British diplomatic historian who authored several books on the Sino-Indian border dispute and the Indo-Pakistani dispute over Kashmir. He also worked in archaeology and ethnography in Asia and Africa.

== Life and career ==
Alastair Lamb was born on 9 January 1930 in Harbin, China. His father, Lionel Lamb, was a Sinologist and British consular officer posted to China. His mother Jean Lamb née MacDonald was Australian-born. During 1941–1942, his parents were interned by the Japanese occupation forces. Alastair was sent out to Britain to stay with his paternal grandfather, Harry Lamb, who was also a diplomat.

Alastair Lamb studied at Harrow School in London and then went to the King's College of the University of Cambridge in 1953. He graduated in history and followed it with a doctorate in 1958. He was a diplomatic historian by training. His thesis was on the history of the British Indian border, especially against Tibet, between the era of Warren Hastings and the 1904 British expedition. This work was published as Britain and Chinese Central Asia in 1960, later revised as British India and Tibet in 1986.

In 1959, Lamb moved to British Malaya where he was a reader of history at the University of Malaya for nine years. He also studied Malayan and Thai archaeological sites with Hindu and Buddhist heritage. Later he spent three years as a senior fellow in the department of history at the Australian National University. From 1968 to 1972, he was a professor of history at the University of Ghana. He spent some time in the office of Pakistan's leader Zulfikar Ali Bhutto in the 1970s. In the 1980s, he worked as a reader of history at Hatfield Polytechnic in Britain.

Lamb died on 15 March 2023, at the age of 93.

== Research ==
Lamb's doctoral thesis on the history of the Younghusband Expedition was published in 1960 by Routledge & Kegan Paul as the book Britain and Chinese Central Asia: The Road to Lhasa 1761 to 1905. The book was revised and published in 1986 under a new title, British India and Tibet: 1766-1910, by bringing it up to the events of 1910 based on newly released archival documents.

In the 1960s, Lamb studied Hindu and Buddhist sites in Kedah and southern Thailand in a series of papers.

When the China–India border dispute was getting critical in 1962, Lamb was conducting research in British archives in the Public Record Office and the India Office Library. Lamb has stated that he came across a number of documents in the archive which looked "rather different" from the versions published by the Indian Ministry of External Affairs. Through the mediation of Dorothy Woodman, Lamb managed to meet a senior official in the Indian High Commission in London in order to bring these facts to India's notice. However, he stated the official was least interested. The more he checked the published Indian documents, the more convinced he became of "distortions and misquotations". Thus he came to the "reluctant conclusion", he said, that the Indian government was least interested in the historical accuracy of its territorial claims. This motivated him to write The China-India border in 1964, where he claimed he did his utmost to "play down the defects of the Indian published material". In 1966, he expanded the book into a large two-volume work titled The McMahon Line.

Lamb also came to be recognised as an expert on the juridical and diplomatic history of the Kashmir dispute. He wrote his first book on the Kashmir conflict in 1966, titled The Crisis in Kashmir. This was soon after the Second Kashmir War. In 1991, after the start of the Kashmir insurgency, he expanded it into a larger volume titled Kashmir: A Disputed Legacy.

== Reception ==
Journalist and scholar, Andrew Whitehead cited Alastair Lamb of achieving fame and eminence writing about Kashmiri history, whose work is however tarnished by partisan comments. Scholar Ian Copland has called him a "meticulous historian" with exhaustive research and eye for detail. Parshotam Mehra called him "a professional historian of great academic distinction". He stated that his work was thorough and painstaking even though it suffered from gaps in the presentation and interpretation.

Certain aspects of Lamb's claims related to India-China, such as claims of India being an aggressor or Lamb's claims on the Shimla convention, have been countered by Bertil Lintner's book, China’s India War.

=== The McMahon Line ===
Leo Rose called the book a "special pleading" rather than a scholarly work, which presents the Chinese position extremely well. Lamb points out rightly that China had never ratified the Simla Convention which contained the definition of the McMahon Line but he dismisses the question of whether the British and Tibetan governments were competent to conclude the agreement. Rose also notes that Lamb seems annoyed at the fact that the authorities of independent India do not follow the British imperial line, which he terms "out of place".

Parshotam Mehra, calling the two-volume work a "herculean effort", nevertheless labels it an "outright partisan attempt at demolishing the Indian case and thereby lending countenance to, and buttressing, the Chinese claims." The historian in Alastair Lamb is "fairly sound", he says, but frequently departs from being a historian to a "factionist". Mehra's own later work, McMahon Line and After was judged by Leo Rose to be "more balanced and less advocative" than Lamb's.

Wim van Eekelen describes the work as an "impressive and well-documented study of the relations between India, China, and Tibet between 1904 and 1914", which was in agreement with his own research in the India Office Library. Van Eekelen notes that due to greater weight being placed on the opinions exchanged with London, Lamb's book tends to be critical of the Indian government and disparaging of the Tibetan point of view, but that these criticisms were "often more a matter of accent than of substance."

=== Kashmir: A Disputed Legacy, 1846–1990 ===
Victoria Schofield describes the book as an expansion of Lamb's earlier work with the use of newly available documents. Schofield states that Lamb successfully identified the main issues and mistakes. Schofield finds that Lamb's work is so filled with facts that additional notes are provided with each chapter. Lamb also successfully shows the impact a few individuals have had on South Asia's history.

Ross H. Munro observes that Lamb has written an authoritative history of Kashmir. He called Lamb's work a "tour de force" that "combines impeccable scholarship with an fascinating story". Munro sees that Lamb refutes India's claim on Kashmir and seriously indicts Indian actions, leaders and also his own countryman, Mountbatten. Victor Kiernan recommends the book. Kiernan notes that Lamb is the top authority on the region and describes the book, like Lamb's previous ones, as very thorough, uninvolved and objective, regardless of the rare instance where India is treated with "little sympathy." Historian Hugh Tinker notices that Alastair Lamb explains Kashmiri political history in a "masterly style." Tinker points out that Lamb is known as the foremost authority on the region but also notes that his findings will not be accepted by Indian authors, who see Kashmir as a test of Indian secularism. Copland observes that Lamb's analysis of the Kashmir conflict is the most detailed and describes his work as a "considerable feat of scholarship." Copland states that the problems in the book are "few and far between" and notes that this high calibre book's bibliography ignores post-1980 writings.

Parshotam Mehra, on the other hand, points out that Lamb is unabashedly pro-Pakistan with several bones to pick against India, arguing for various ways in which Kashmir could have gone to Pakistan instead of India. He also points out how Lamb glosses over the culpability of Pakistan in the 1947 crisis as well as in later developments, facts which scholars such as Ayesha Jalal admit. Mehra concludes:

That Islamabad has a case of sorts would be hard to deny, but that New Delhi has none may be difficult to accept. The path of reason, which this study sadly spurns, is to map out the common ground...

Prem Shankar Jha, in his Kashmir 1947: Rival Versions of History, tried to provide a detailed critique of the contentious aspects of Lamb's treatment of the Kashmir dispute, although David Taylor points out that while providing alternative readings on some points, Jha does not manage to entirely refute Lamb. Srinath Raghavan credits Lamb with discovering that Kashmir's Instrument of Accession was most likely signed on 27 October 1947, after the Indian troops landed in Srinagar, rather than 26 October, as official Indian history maintains. However, he states that in his later work, Birth of a Tragedy, Lamb "overreached" by claiming that the Maharaja of Jammu and Kashmir never signed the Instrument of Accession at all. He conveniently overlooked other letters where the Maharaja mentioned having signed accession.

== Honours ==
Lamb was a Fellow of the Society of Antiquaries of London and a Fellow of the Royal Asiatic Society. He was also a council member of the Malaysian Branch of the Royal Asiatic Society.

== Selected publications ==
- The China–India Border: The Origins of the Disputed Boundaries (Chatham House, 1964)
- The McMahon Line: A Study in the Relations Between, India, China and Tibet, 1904 to 1914 (2 volumes, Routledge & Kegan Paul, 1966)
- The Crisis in Kashmir 1947–1966 (London: Routledge & Kegan Paul, 1966), also published as The Kashmir Problem 1947–1966 (New York: Frederick A. Praeger, 1966)
- Asian Frontiers (Praeger, 1968)
- The Sino-Indian Border in Ladakh (Australian National University Press, 1973)
- British India and Tibet 1766-1910 (Routledge, 1986)
- Tibet, China & India 1914-1950 (Roxford Books, (Note: Roxford Books is a self-publication label of Alastair and Venice Lamb) 1989)
- Kashmir: A Disputed Legacy 1846-1990 (Roxford Books, 1991; OUP Pakistan, 1992). ISBN 9780907129066, ISBN 9780195774238
- Birth of a Tragedy, Kashmir 1947 (Roxford Books, 1994). ISBN 9780907129073, ISBN 9780195775891
- Incomplete Partition, 1947-48 (Roxford Books, 1997). ISBN 0907129080, ISBN 0195797671
- Miscellaneous Papers on Early Hindu and Buddhist Settlement in Northern Malaya and Southern Thailand. pp. 90, pls. 117. Federation Museums Journal, Vol. VI, New Series, Kuala Lumpur, 1961.
- "Bhutan and Tibet: Travels of Bogle and Hamilton 1774-1777, Volume I: Letters, Journals & Memoranda" (Roxford Books, 1995). ISBN 978-0907129134
