= Kamba County =

Kamba County 岗巴县 • གམ་པ་རྫོང་། Gamba, Gangba
- County
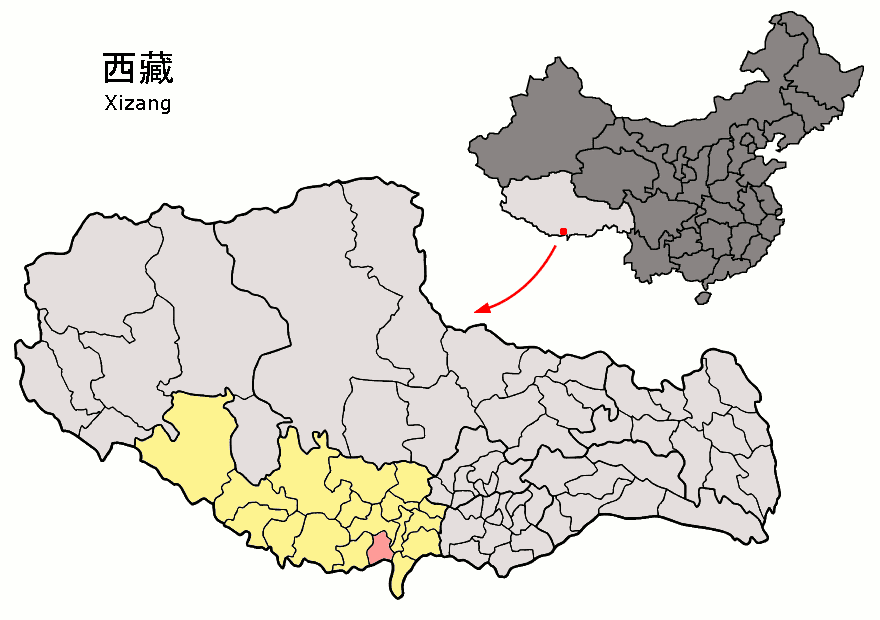
- Location of Kamba County (red) within Xigazê City (yellow) and the Tibet A.R.

- Location of the seat in the Tibet A.R. Kamba (China)
- Coordinates: 28°16′33″N 88°31′14″E
- Country: China
- Autonomous region: Tibet
- Prefecture-level city: Xigazê
- County seat: Kamba

Area
  - Total: 4,204 km^{2} (1,623 sq mi)

Population (2020)
  - Total: 11,276
  - Density: 2.682/km^{2} (6.947/sq mi)
- Time zone: UTC+8 (China Standard)
- Website: www.gbx.gov.cn

Kamba County

Chinese name
- Simplified Chinese: 岗巴县
- Traditional Chinese: 崗巴縣
Transcriptions
Standard Mandarin
- Hanyu Pinyin: Gǎngbā Xiàn

Tibetan name
- Tibetan: གམ་པ་རྫོང་།
Transcriptions
- Wylie: gam pa rdzong
- Tibetan Pinyin: Gamba Zong

Kamba County (Tibetan: གམ་པ་རྫོང, Chinese: 岗巴县) is a county of Xigazê in the Tibet Autonomous Region, China, bordering India's Sikkim state to the south.

== Administration divisions ==
Kamba County is divided into 1 town and 4 townships.

Name	Chinese	Hanyu Pinyin	Tibetan	Wylie
Town
Kampa Town (Kampa Dzong)	岗巴镇	Gǎngbā zhèn	གམ་པ་གྲོང་རྡལ།	gam pa grong rdal
Townships
Changlung Township	昌龙乡	Chānglóng xiāng	གྲང་ལུང་ཤང་།	grang lung shang
Chig Township	直克乡	Zhíkè xiāng	འགྲིགས་ཤང་།	'grigs shang
Gurme Township	孔玛乡	Kǒngmǎ xiāng	གུར་མེ་ཤང་།	gur me shang
Lungrong Township	龙中乡	Lóngzhōng xiāng	གྲང་ལུང་ཤང་།	grang lung shang
