= John Claude White =

British engineer, civil servant and photographer

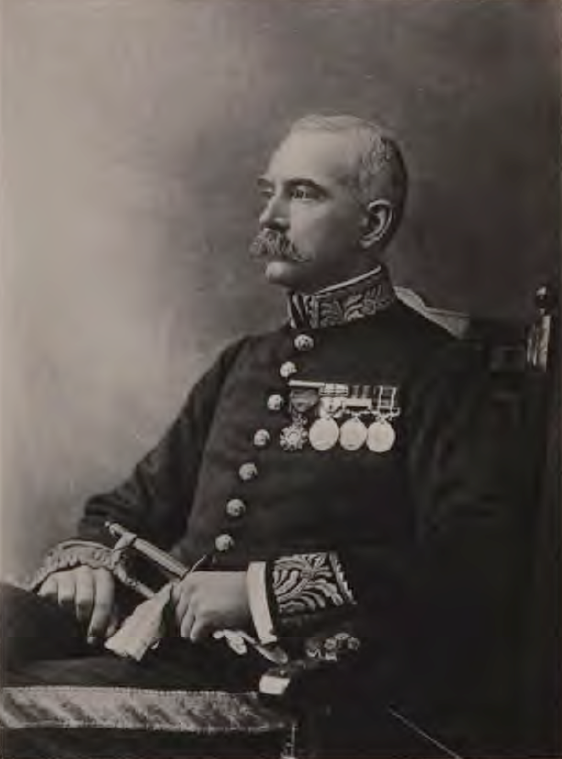
- Born: 1 October 1853; Kolkata
- Died: 1918 (aged 64–65)
- Occupation: Photographer

John Claude White (1 October 1853 – 1918) CIE was an engineer, photographer, author and civil servant in British India. From 1889 to 1908, White was the political officer in Sikkim, then a British protectorate. As part of his remit, he also managed British India's relations with Tibet and Bhutan.

== Early life ==
The son of army surgeon John White (1871–1920) and Louise Henriette (Claude) Pfeffer White, he was born in Calcutta (now Kolkata), India. His education included a period at Rugby School for six months in 1868. White later studied at the Royal Indian Engineering College in Cooper's Hill, Surrey before joining the Bengal Public Works Department as Assistant Engineer in 1876.

== India and Sikkim ==
White originally worked in Bengal, Nepal and Darjeeling. In 1883, he was assigned to the British Residency in Kathmandu, Nepal where he photographed the architecture and monuments.

In 1889, White was appointed Political Officer in Sikkim which had come under British protectorate by this time. White served as the Chairman of the Council that advised Sikkim's Chogyal Thutob Namgyal whereafter he reorganised Sikkim's administration. He ordered land and mineral surveys and developed unused wasteland. He also established a forestry department and the first police post in Aritar as well as introducing English apple cultivation in the northern towns of Lachung and Lachen.

Following the 1890 Convention of Calcutta signed by Britain and Qing China regarding the Sikkim–Tibet boundary and trade relations with Tibet, White was asked to investigate the location known as "Yatung" (Old Yatung) in the Chumbi Valley for the establishment of a trade mart. He subsequently reported that although the Chinese were friendly towards him, they "had no authority whatever" and were unable to control the Tibetans. White concluded that "China was suzerain over Tibet only in name".

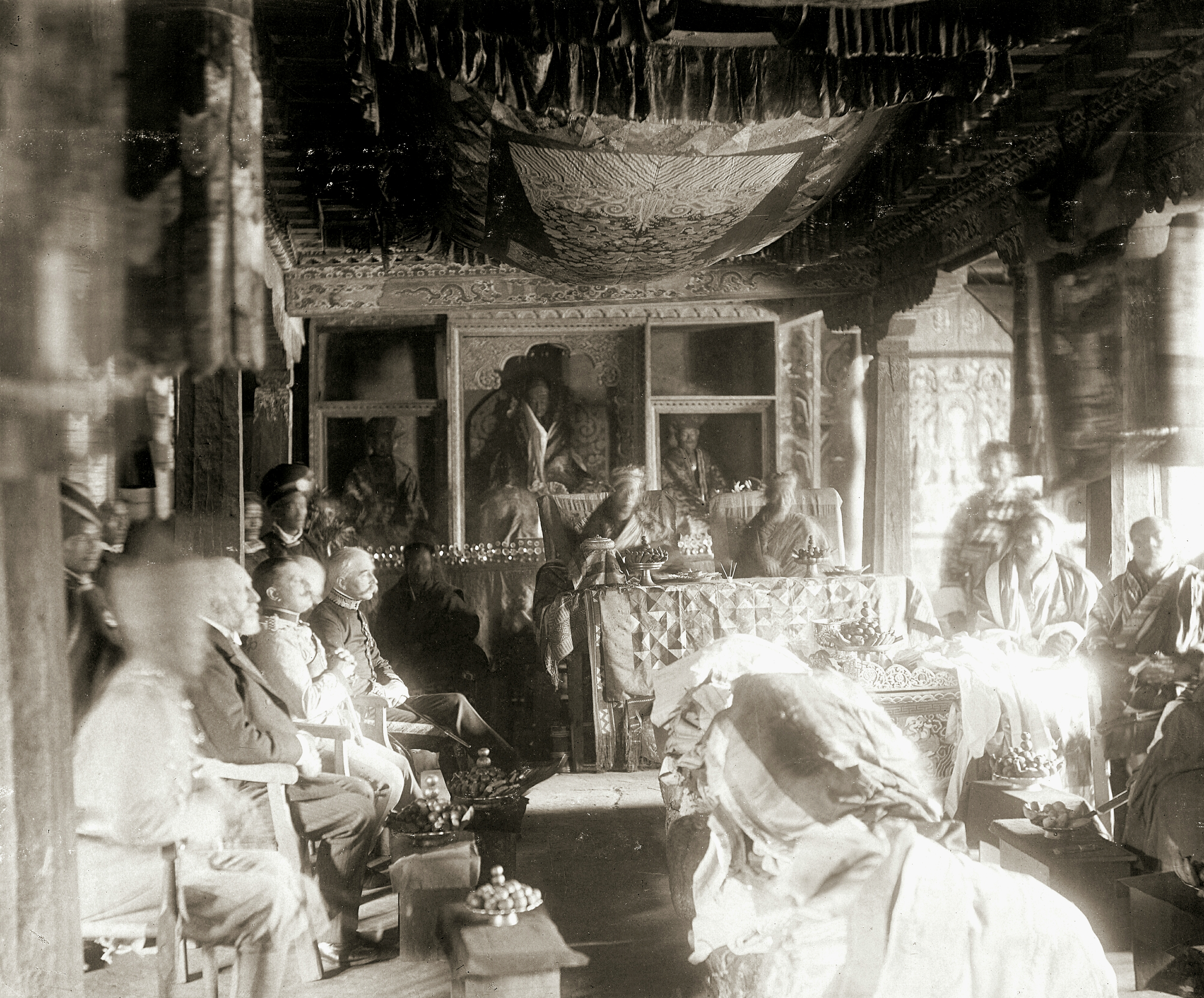
White, seated 4th on left, at the Durbar of Ugyen Wangchuck, who is receiving the order of the Knight Commander of the Indian Empire, at Punakha Dzong, Bhutan, 1905

In 1903, the Viceroy, Lord Curzon, appointed a Tibet Frontier Commission under Francis Younghusband, which led the 1903-04 British expedition to Tibet. The putative aim of the expedition was to settle disputes over the Sikkim-Tibet border but in reality it became (by exceeding instructions from London) a de facto invasion of Tibet. White was asked to as the deputy to Younghusband. He was unhappy with this secondment and complained to Lord Curzon. Younghusband saw this as insubordination, as did his masters in Shimla, and the appointment was confirmed.

White is claimed to have been the only member of the Tibet expedition permitted to photograph Lhasa's monasteries.

He made five trips to Bhutan and in 1907 photographed the coronation of the country's first king.

== Personal life ==
On 12 September 1876, before departing for India, White married his distant cousin Jessie Georgina Ranken at All Saints Church in Kensington, London. They had a daughter, Beryl born in Bengal in 1877.

== Photography ==
White created a rich and detailed photographic account of the culture and scenery of the Himalayas during his travels through the region. John Falconer, curator of photographs at the British Library’s Oriental and India Office Collections described White's work as "probably one of the last, and certainly among the most impressive products of a tradition of quasi-amateur photography which had flourished among administrators and military personnel in India since the 1850s."

The 2005 book In the Shadow of the Himalayas: Tibet, Bhutan, Nepal, Sikkim : a Photographic Record by John Claude White, 1883–1908 contains an anthology of Himalayan photos taken by White.

== Works ==
- Sikhim & Bhutan: Twenty-one years on the North East Frontier 1887–1908. London: Edward Arnold. 1909.

== See also ==
- History of Sikkim
