= British expedition to Tibet =

1903–1904 military expedition

- Part of the Great Game
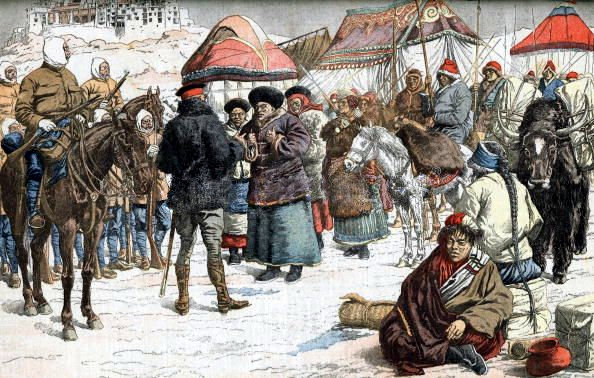
- British Raj officers with Qing amban and Tibetans
Date	December 1903 – September 1904
Location	Southern Tibetan Plateau 26°05′20″N 89°16′37″E
Result	British-Indian victory: Convention of Lhasa; Return to status quo ante bellum; British occupation of Chumbi Valley until 1908 for Chinese payment of indemnities

Belligerents
Britain: British India	(Qing dynasty) Great Qing: Tibet

Commanders and leaders
James Macdonald; Francis Younghusband	(Tibet) 13th Dalai Lama (Tibet) Dapon Tailing

Strength
3,000 soldiers 7,000 support troops	Unknown, several thousand peasant conscripts

Casualties and losses
202 killed in action 411 non-combat deaths	2,000–3,000 killed

The British expedition to Tibet, also known as the Younghusband expedition, began in December 1903 and lasted until September 1904. The expedition was effectively a temporary invasion by British Indian Armed Forces under the auspices of the Tibet Frontier Commission, whose purported mission was to establish diplomatic relations and resolve the dispute over the border between Tibet and Sikkim. In the nineteenth century, the British had conquered Burma and Sikkim, with the whole southern flank of Tibet coming under the control of the British Indian Empire. Tibet was ruled by the 13th Dalai Lama under the Ganden Phodrang government as a Himalayan state nominally under the protectorate (or suzerainty) of the Chinese Qing dynasty until the 1911 Revolution, after which a period of de facto Tibetan independence (1912–1951) followed.

The invasion was intended to counter the Russian Empire's perceived ambitions in the East and was initiated largely by Lord Curzon, the head of the British Indian government. Curzon had long held deep concerns over Russia's advances in central Asia and now feared a Russian invasion of British India. In April 1903, the British government received clear assurances from Russia that it had no interest in Tibet. "In spite, however, of the Russian assurances, Lord Curzon continued to press for the dispatch of a mission to Tibet," a high level British political officer noted.

The expeditionary force fought its way to Gyantse and eventually reached Lhasa, the capital of Tibet, in August 1904. The Dalai Lama, Thubten Gyatso, had fled to safety, first to Mongolia and then to China proper. The poorly trained and equipped Tibetans proved no match for the modern equipment and training of the British Indian forces. At Lhasa, the Commission forced remaining Tibetan officials to sign the Convention of Lhasa, before withdrawing to Sikkim in September, with the understanding the Chinese government would not permit any other country to interfere with the administration of Tibet.

The mission was recognized as a military expedition by the British Indian government, which issued a campaign medal, the Tibet Medal, to all those who took part.

== Background ==
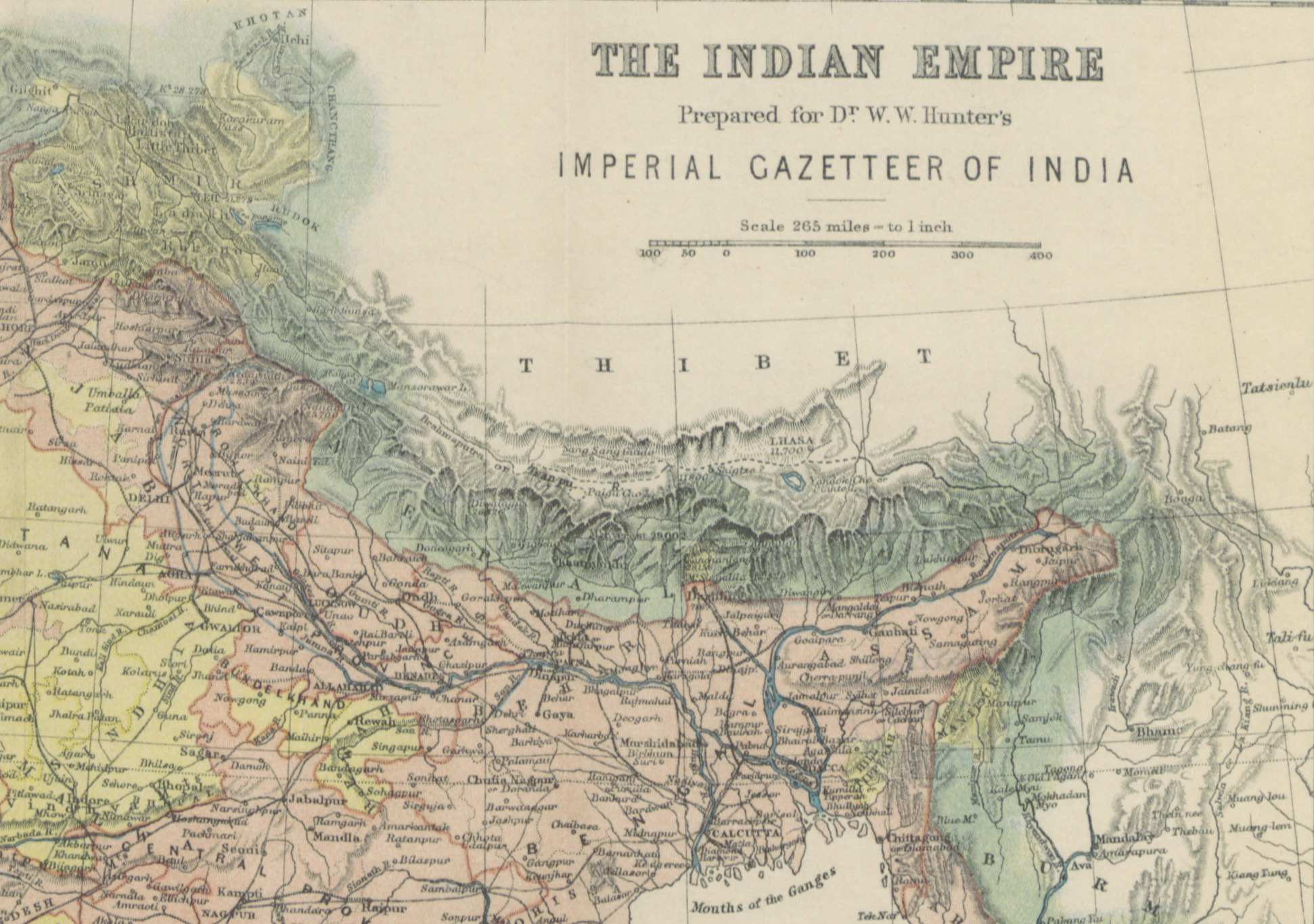
India's frontier with Tibet in the late 19th century

British-ruled India came in contact with Tibet after the annexation of Kumaon and Garhwal in 1815, and it expanded further with their reach into Punjab and Kashmir. However, the British were unable to carry out any negotiations or trade with Tibet. After Sikkim came under British protection in 1861, its border with Tibet needed to be defined. Sikkim also appeared to the British as an ideal route to conduct trade with Tibet.

The presence of Chinese ambans in Tibet led the British to assume that China possessed authority over Tibet and they began to negotiate with China regarding relations with Tibet. However, the Tibetans rejected the results of these negotiations, including the border settlement and the trade agreement. Tibetan troops erected a stone fortress across the trade route on Sikkimese territory. Protests to China obtained no relief. Boundary pillars erected by the British and Chinese commissioners were removed by the Tibetans. The British trade commissioner was told that Tibet did not recognise the concessions made by China. British efforts to directly negotiate with the Tibetans were also rebuffed. The Chinese inability to implement the concessions exposed their "impotence" in Tibet. The British Governor-General came to the conclusion that Chinese suzerainty over Tibet was a "constitutional fiction", which was maintained only for mutual convenience and had no effect in practice.

On top of this, there were rumours and suspicions in the British colonial government that the Tibetans had reached a secret understanding with the Russians over Tibet, and that Russia was providing arms and fighting forces to Tibet against the British Raj. Russian influence in Tibet would afford them a direct route to British India, breaking the chain of quasi-autonomous buffer-states that separated the Raj from the Russian Empire to the north. These rumours were supported by the Russian exploration of Tibet and the presence of a Siberian-born courtier and Mongolian Buddhist lama named Agvan Dorzhiev, who knew and tutored the 13th Dalai Lama. While the Dalai Lama declined to have dealings with the British, he established contact with the Tsar of Russia through Dorzhiev. In 1900, he sent an appeal for Russian protection through Dorzhiev, who met the Tsar at the imperial summer residence in Livadia on 30 September 1900. Gifts were exchanged and the possibility of a Russian consulate in Tibet was discussed. In 1901 Dorzhiev and other representatives met with the Tsar at Peterhof. A Russo-Tibetan treaty was drafted but not adopted due to fears of conflict with the British and Qing regimes. Russia sent back arms and ammunition, as well as a set of Russian Episcopal robes, to the Dalai Lama.

These events reinforced the Governor-General Lord Curzon's belief that the Dalai Lama intended to place Tibet firmly within a sphere of Russian influence and end its neutrality. In 1903, Curzon sent a request to the governments of China and Tibet for negotiations, to be held at Khampa Dzong, a tiny Tibetan village north of Sikkim to establish trade agreements. The Chinese were willing, and ordered the thirteenth Dalai Lama to attend. However, the Dalai Lama refused, and also refused to provide transport to enable the amban, Yu Tai, to attend.

== Tibet Frontier Commission ==
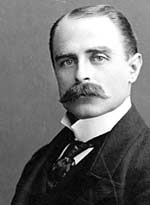
Col. Francis Younghusband

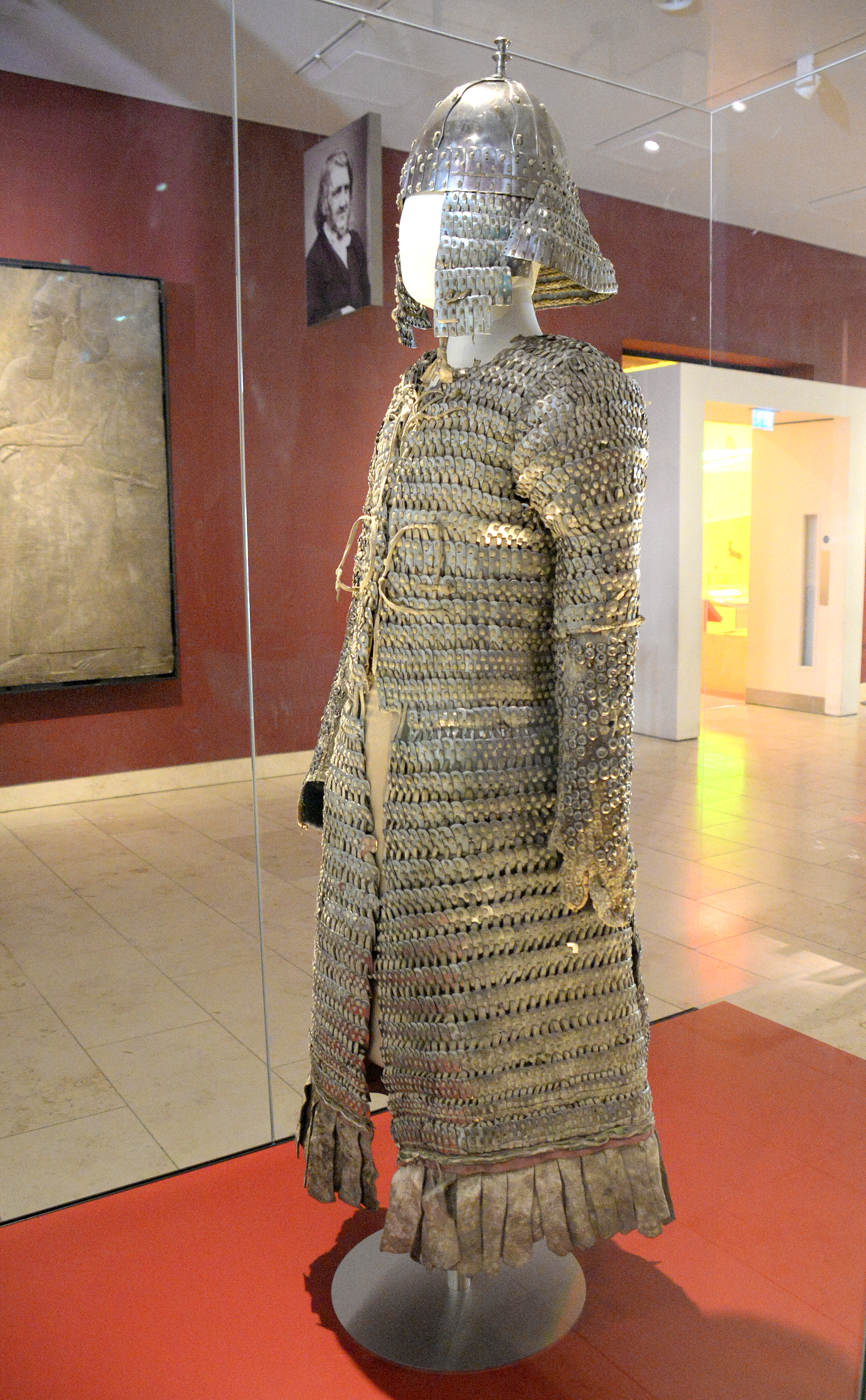
Lamellar coat and helmet. From Tibet, in modern-day China. 14th–17th century CE. Iron, leather, and textile. Presented by Lieutenant Colonel Sir Francis Younghusband. Discoveries Gallery, National Museum of Scotland

Governor-General Curzon gained approval from London to send a Tibet Frontier Commission, led by Colonel Francis Younghusband with John Claude White and E. C. Wilson as Deputy Commissioners, to Khampa Dzong. However, it is not known whether the Balfour government was fully aware of the difficulty of the operation, or of the Tibetan opinion of the idea.

On 19 July 1903, Younghusband arrived at Gangtok, the capital city of the British Indian princely state of Sikkim, where John Claude White was political officer, to prepare for his mission. White was unhappy with his secondment to the expeditionary force and, to Younghusband's displeasure, had done everything in his power to have the appointment cancelled. He failed, and Younghusband had his revenge for White's insubordination when he later left him in the leech-infested jungles of Sikkim to arrange for mules and coolies to transport supplies to the expedition.

Meanwhile, a letter from the under-secretary to the government of India to Younghusband on 26 July 1903 stated that "In the event of your meeting the Dalai Lama, the government of India authorizes you to give him the assurance which you suggest in your letter." From August 1903, Younghusband and his escort commander at Khampa Dzong, Lieutenant Colonel Herbert Brander, tried to provoke the Tibetans into a confrontation. The British took a few months to prepare for the expedition that pressed into Tibetan territories in early December 1903 following an act of "Tibetan hostility", which was afterwards established by the British resident in Nepal to have been the herding of some trespassing Nepalese yaks and their drovers back across the border. When Younghusband telegrammed the Viceroy, in an attempt to strengthen the British Cabinet's support of the invasion, that intelligence indicated Russian arms had entered Tibet, Curzon privately silenced him. "Remember that in the eyes of HMG we are advancing not because of Dorzhiev, or Russian rifles in Lhasa, but because of our Convention shamelessly violated, our frontier trespassed upon, our subjects arrested, our mission flouted, our representations ignored."

=== Opposing forces ===
The Tibetan soldiers were almost all rapidly impressed peasants, who lacked organisation, discipline, training, and motivation. Only a handful of their most devoted units, comprising monks armed usually with swords and jingals, proved to be effective, but they were in such small numbers as to be unable to reverse the tide of battle. This problem was exacerbated by their generals, who seemed in awe of the British and refused to make any aggressive moves against the small and often dispersed column. They also failed conspicuously to properly defend their natural barriers, frequently offering battle in relatively open ground, where Maxim guns and rifle volleys caused great numbers of casualties.

By contrast, the British and Indian troops were experienced veterans of mountainous border warfare on the North-West Frontier, as was their commanding officer.

The British force, which consisted mostly of British Indian troops, numbered over 3,000 fighting men complemented by 7,000 sherpas, porters, and camp followers. This force consisted of elements of the 8th Gurkhas, 40th Pathans, 23rd and 32nd Sikh Pioneers, 19th Punjab Infantry, and the Royal Fusiliers, as well as mountain artillery, engineers, Maxim machine gun detachments from four regiments, and thousands of porters recruited from Nepal and Sikkim. The British authorities, anticipating the problems of high altitude conflict, included many Gurkha and Pathan troops from mountainous regions such as Nepal; six companies of the 23rd Sikh Pioneers, four companies of the 8th Gurkhas in reserve at Gnatong in Sikkim, and two Gurkha companies guarding the British camp at Khamba Dzong were involved.

=== Preparations ===
The Tibetans were aware of the expedition, and a Tibetan general at Yatung wondered about British intentions. Colonel Younghusband replied, on 6 December 1903, that "we are not at war with Tibet, and unless we are ourselves attacked, we shall not attack the Tibetans". When no Tibetan or Chinese officials met the British at Khampa Dzong, Younghusband advanced with some 1,150 soldiers, porters, labourers, and thousands of pack animals, to Tuna, 50 miles beyond the border. After waiting more months there, hoping in vain to be met by negotiators, the expedition received orders (in 1904) to continue toward Lhasa.

The Tibet government, guided by the thirteenth Dalai Lama, alarmed by a foreign power dispatching a military mission to its capital, began marshalling its armed forces.

== Expedition ==
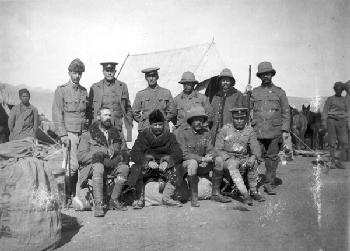
Major Francis Younghusband leading a British force to Lhasa in 1904

The British army that departed Gnathong in Sikkim on 11 December 1903 was well prepared for battle, having had long experience of Indian border wars. Its commander, Brigadier General James Ronald Leslie Macdonald, wintered in the border country, using the time to train his troops near regular supplies of food and shelter before advancing in earnest in March 1904, travelling over 50 miles (80 km) before encountering his first major obstacle at the pass of Guru (28.0895°N 89.2778°E), near Lake Bam Tso (or Dochen Tso) on 31 March.

=== Massacre of Chumik Shenko ===
A military confrontation on 31 March 1904 became known as the Massacre of Chumik Shenko. Facing the vanguard of Macdonald's army and blocking the road was a Tibetan force of 3,000 armed with antiquated matchlock muskets, ensconced behind a 5-foot-high (1.5 m) rock wall. On the slope above, the Tibetans had placed seven or eight sangars. The Commissioner, Younghusband, was asked to stop but replied that the advance must continue, and that he could not allow any Tibetan troops to remain on the road. The Tibetans would not fight, but nor would they vacate their positions. Younghusband and Macdonald agreed that "the only thing to do was to disarm them and let them go". British writer Charles Allen has also suggested that a dummy attack was played out in an effort to provoke the Tibetans into opening fire.

It seems then that scuffles between the Sikhs and Tibetan guards grouped around Tibetan generals sparked an action of the Lhasa general: he fired a pistol hitting a Sikh in the jaw. British accounts insist that the Tibetan general became angry at the sight of the brawl developing and shot the Sikh soldier in the face, prompting a violent response from the soldier's comrades, which rapidly escalated the situation. Henry Newman, a reporter for Reuters, who described himself as an eye-witness, said that following this shot, the mass of Tibetans surged forward and their attack fell next on a correspondent for the Daily Mail, Edmund Candler, and that very soon after this, fire was directed from three sides on the Tibetans crowded behind the wall. In Doctor Austine Waddell's account, "they poured a withering fire into the enemy, which, with the quick firing Maxims, mowed down the Tibetans in a few minutes with a terrific slaughter." Second-hand accounts from the Tibetan side have asserted both that the British tricked the Tibetans into extinguishing the fuses for their matchlocks, and that the British opened fire without warning. However, no evidence exists to show such trickery took place and the likelihood is that the unwieldy weapons were of very limited use in the circumstances. Furthermore, the British, Sikh, and Gurkha soldiers closest to the Tibetans were nearly all protected by a high wall, and none were killed.

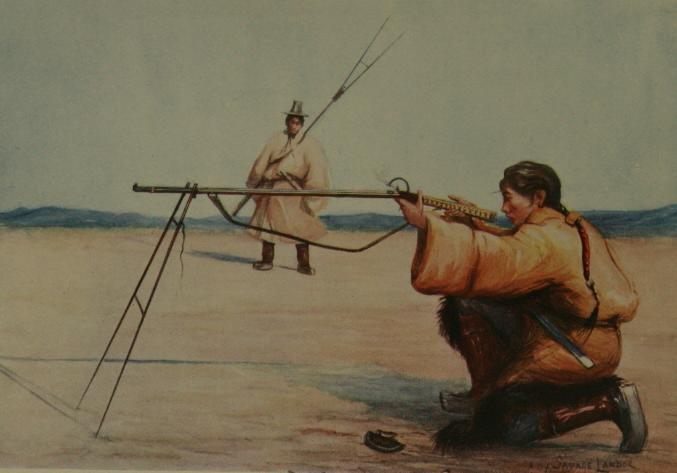
Tibetan soldier during target practice

The Tibetans were mown down by the Maxim guns as they fled. "I got so sick of the slaughter that I ceased fire, though the general's order was to make as big a bag as possible", wrote Lieutenant Arthur Hadow, commander of the Maxim guns detachment. "I hope I shall never again have to shoot down men walking away."

Half a mile from the battlefield, the Tibetan forces reached shelter and were allowed to withdraw by Brigadier-General Macdonald. Behind them, they left between 600 and 700 dead and 168 wounded, 148 of whom survived in British field hospitals as prisoners. British casualties were 12 wounded. During this battle and some to follow, the Tibetans wore amulets which their lamas had promised would magically protect them from any harm. After one battle, surviving Tibetans showed profound confusion over the ineffectiveness of these amulets. In a telegraph to his superior in India a day later, Younghusband stated: "I trust the tremendous punishment they have received will prevent further fighting, and induce them at last to negotiate."

=== Advance to Gyantse ===
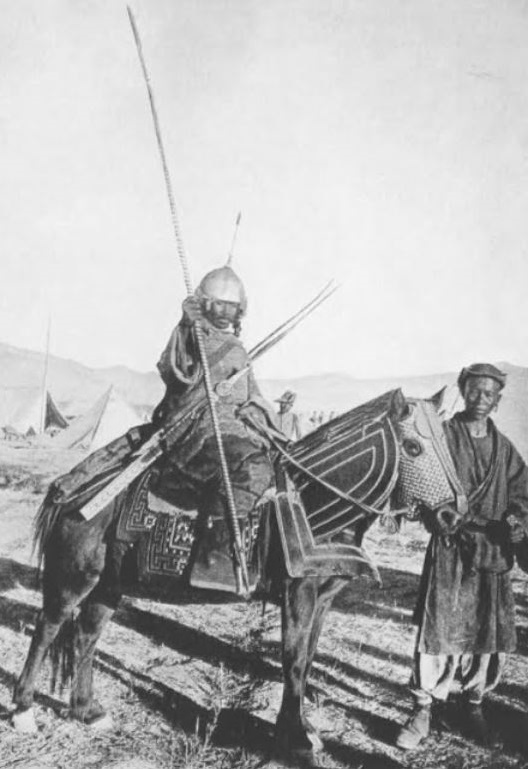
Armoured Tibetan horseman

Past the first barrier and with increasing momentum, Macdonald's force crossed abandoned defences at Kangma a week later, and on 9 April attempted to pass through Red Idol Gorge, which had been fortified to prevent passage. Macdonald ordered his Gurkha troops to scale the steep hillsides of the gorge and drive out the Tibetan forces ensconced high on their cliffs. This they began, but soon were lost in a furious blizzard, which stopped all communications with the Gurkha force. Some hours later, exploratory probes down the pass encountered shooting and a desultory exchange continued till the storm ended around noon, which showed that the Gurkhas had by chance found their way to a position above the Tibetan troops. Thus faced with shooting from both sides as Sikh soldiers pushed up the hill, the Tibetans moved back, again coming under severe fire from British artillery and retreated in good order, leaving behind 200 dead. British losses were again negligible.

Following this fight at the "Red Idol Gorge", as the British later called it, the British military pressed on to Gyantse, reaching it on 11 April. The town's gates were opened before Macdonald's forces, the garrison having already departed. Francis Younghusband wrote to his father; "As I have always said, the Tibetans are nothing but sheep." The townspeople continued with their business and the Westerners took a look at the monastic complex, the Palkor Chode. The central feature was the Temple of One Hundred Thousand Deities, a nine-storey stupa, modelled on the Mahabodhi Temple at Bodhgaya, the spot where Gautama Buddha first achieved enlightenment. Statuettes and scrolls were shared out between officers. Younghusband's Mission Staff and Escort were billeted in the country mansion and farmyard of a Tibetan noble family named Changlo, and 'Changlo Manor' became the Mission Headquarters where Younghusband could hold his durbars and meet representatives of the Dalai Lama. In the words of historian Charles Allen, they now entered 'a halcyon period', even planting a vegetable garden at the Manor while officers explored the town unescorted, or went fishing and shooting. The commission's medical officer, the philanthropic Captain Herbert Walton, attended to the needs of the local populace, notably performing operations to correct cleft palates, a particularly common affliction in Tibet. Five days after he arrived at Gyantse, and deeming the defences of Changlo Manor secure, Macdonald ordered the main force to begin the march back to New Chumbi to protect the supply line.

Younghusband wanted to move the Mission to Lhasa and telegraphed London for an opinion but got no reply. Reaction in Britain to the events of Chumik Shenko had been one of "shock [and] growing disquiet". The Spectator and Punch magazines had expressed views critical of a spectacle that included "half-armed men" being wiped out "with the irresistible weapons of science". In Whitehall, the Cabinet "kept its collective head down". Meanwhile, intelligence reached Younghusband that Tibetan troops had gathered at Karo La, 45 miles east of Gyantse.

Lieutenant Colonel Herbert Brander, Commander of the Mission Escort at Changlo Manor, decided to strike against the Tibetan force assembling at Karo La without consulting Brigadier General Macdonald, who was two days' riding away. Brander consulted Younghusband instead, who declared himself in favour of the action. Perceval Landon, correspondent of The Times who had sat in on the discussions, observed that it was "injudicious" to attack the Tibetans, and that it was "quite out of keeping with the studious way in which we have hitherto kept ourselves in the right." Brander's telegram setting out his plans reached Macdonald at New Chumbi on 3 May and he sought to reverse the action, but it was too late. The battle at Karo La on 5–6 May is possibly the highest altitude action in history, won by Gurkha riflemen of the 8th Gurkhas and sepoys of the 32nd Sikh Pioneers who had climbed and then fought at an altitude in excess of 5,700 m.

=== Mission under siege ===
Meanwhile, an estimated 800 Tibetans attacked the Chang Lo garrison. The Tibetan war gave the Mission staff time to form ranks and repulse the assailants, who lost 160 dead; three men of the Mission garrison were killed. An exaggerated account of the attack, written by Lieutenant Leonard Bethell while faraway at New Chumbi, extolled Younghusband's heroism; in fact, Younghusband's own account revealed that he had fled to the Redoubt, where he remained under cover. The Gurkhas' light mountain guns and Maxims which would have been extremely useful in defending the fort, now back in Tibetan hands, had been requisitioned by Brander's Karo La party. Younghusband sent a message to Brander telling him to complete his attack on Karo, and only then to return to relieve the garrison. The unprovoked attack on the Mission and the Tibetans' reoccupation of the Gyantse Dzong, though a shock, did in fact serve Younghusband's purpose. He wrote privately to Lord Curzon: "The Tibetans as usual have played into our hands." To Lord Ampthill in Simla he wrote that "His Majesty's Government must see that the necessity for going to Lhasa has now been proved beyond all doubt."

Following the 5 May attack, the Mission and its garrison remained under constant fire from the Dzong. The Tibetans' weapons may have been inefficient and primitive but they kept up a constant pressure and fatalities were an irregular but nagging reality; a fatality on 6 May was followed by another eleven in the seven weeks after the surprise attack on Changlo Manor. The garrison responded with its own attacks; some of the Mounted Infantry returned from Karo La, armed with new standard-issue Lee–Enfield rifles, and pursued Tibetan horsemen, and one of the Maxims was stationed on the roof and short bursts of machine-gun fire met targets as they appeared on the walls of the Dzong.

The attack on Changlo Manor seemed to spur the British and Indian Governments to renewed efforts, and reinforcements were duly despatched. British troops stationed at Lebong, the 1st battalion of the Royal Fusiliers, the nearest British infantry available, were sent, as well as six companies of Indian troops from the 40th Pathans, a party from the 1st Battalion, the Royal Irish Rifles with two Maxim guns, a British Army Mountain Battery with four ten-pounder guns, and Murree Mountain Battery, as well as two Field Hospitals. Setting out on 24 May 1904, the Royal Fusiliers joined up with Macdonald at New Chumbi, the base depot of the Tibet Mission, in the first days of June.

=== Alarms and politics at Gyantse, and beyond ===
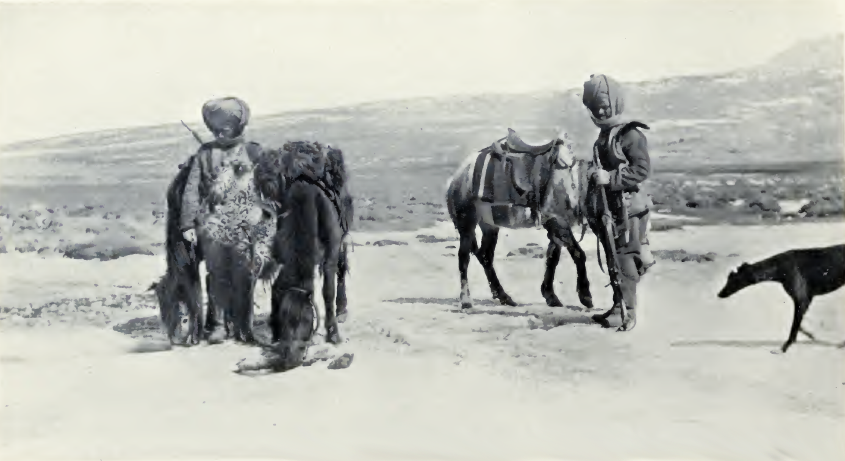
Native troops on the expedition

Significant alarms and actions during this period included fighting on 18–19 May when attempts were made to take a building away from the Tibetans between the Dzong and the Mission post, which were successful. About 50 Tibetans were gunned down and the building was renamed the Gurkha House. On 21 May Brander's fighters set out for the village of Naini, where the monastery and a small fort were occupied by the Tibetans; they were involved in significant fighting but were required to break off to return to defend the Mission which was under concerted attack from the Dzong — an attack stifled by Ottley's Mounted Infantry. It was the last serious attempt by Dapon Tailing (the Tibetan commander of the garrison at Gyantse Dzong) to take Changlo Manor. On 24 May a company of the 32nd Sikh pioneers arrived and Captain Seymour Shepard, DSO, "a legend in the Indian Army" reached Gyantse, commanding a group of sappers, which lifted British morale. On 28 May he was involved in an attack on Palla Manor, 1,000 yards east of Changlo Manor. 400 Tibetans were killed or wounded. No more assaults were contemplated at this point until Macdonald returned with more troops and Brander concentrated on strengthening the 3 positions: the Manor, the Gurka House, and Palla Manor; he also reopened the line of communication with New Chumbi.

By now the Commander-in-Chief in India, Lord Kitchener, was determined to see that Brigadier-General Macdonald should henceforth be in charge of the Mission at all times. The feeling in Simla was that Younghusband was unduly eager to head straight for Lhasa. Younghusband set out for New Chumbi on 6 June and telegraphed Louis Dane, the head of Curzon's Foreign Department, telling him that "we are now fighting the Russians, not the Tibetans. Since Karo La we are dealing with Russia." He further sent off a stream of letters and telegrams claiming there was overwhelming evidence of the Tibetans relying on Russian support and that they were receiving a very substantial amount of it. These were claims with no foundation. Younghusband was ordered by Lord Ampthill, as acting Viceroy, to re-open negotiations and try again to communicate with the Dalai Lama. Reluctantly Younghusband did deliver an ultimatum in two letters, one addressed to the Dalai Lama and one to the Chinese amban, Manchu Resident in Lhasa, Yu-t'ai, though, as he wrote to his sister, he was against this course of action for he saw it as "giving them another chance of negotiating". On 10 June Younghusband arrived at New Chumbi. Macdonald and Younghusband discussed their differences, and on 12 June the Tibet Field Force marched out of New Chumbi.

Once the obstacle of Gyantse Dzong was cleared, the road to Lhasa would be open. Gyantse Dzong was, however, too strong for a small raiding force to capture, and as it overlooked British supply routes, it became the primary target of Macdonald's army. On 26 June, a fortified monastery at Naini which covered the approach was taken in house-to-house fighting by the Gurkhas and 40th Pathan soldiers. Further, Tibetan forces in two forts in the village were caught "between two fires" as the garrison at Changlo Manor joined the fight. On 28 June a final obstacle to assaulting Gyantse Dzong was overcome when the Tsechen Monastery, to the north-west, and the fortress that guarded its rear were cleared by two companies of Gurkhas, the 40th Pathans and two waves of infantry. Since the monastery had offered resistance it was considered fit to loot – several old and valuable thangkas duly surfaced at Christie's later in the summer and were sold for high prices.

Tibetan responses to the invasion so far had comprised almost entirely static defences and sniping from the mountains at the passing column, neither tactic proving effective. Apart from the failed assault on Chang Lo two months previously, the Tibetans had not made any sallies against British positions. This attitude was born of a mix of justifiable fear of the Maxim Guns, and faith in the solid rock of their defences, yet in every battle they were disappointed, primarily by their poor weaponry and inexperienced officers.

On 3 July, a formal durbar was held at the Mission and the Tibetan delegation told by Younghusband to clear out of the Dzong in 36 hours. Younghusband made no effort to negotiate, though why talks could not take place while the Tibetans held the Dzong was not clear. The more patient General Macdonald, meanwhile, was subject to a campaign that sought to undermine his authority; Captain O'Connor wrote to Helen Younghusband on 3 July that "He should be removed & another & better man-a fighting general- substituted".

=== Storming of Gyantse Dzong ===
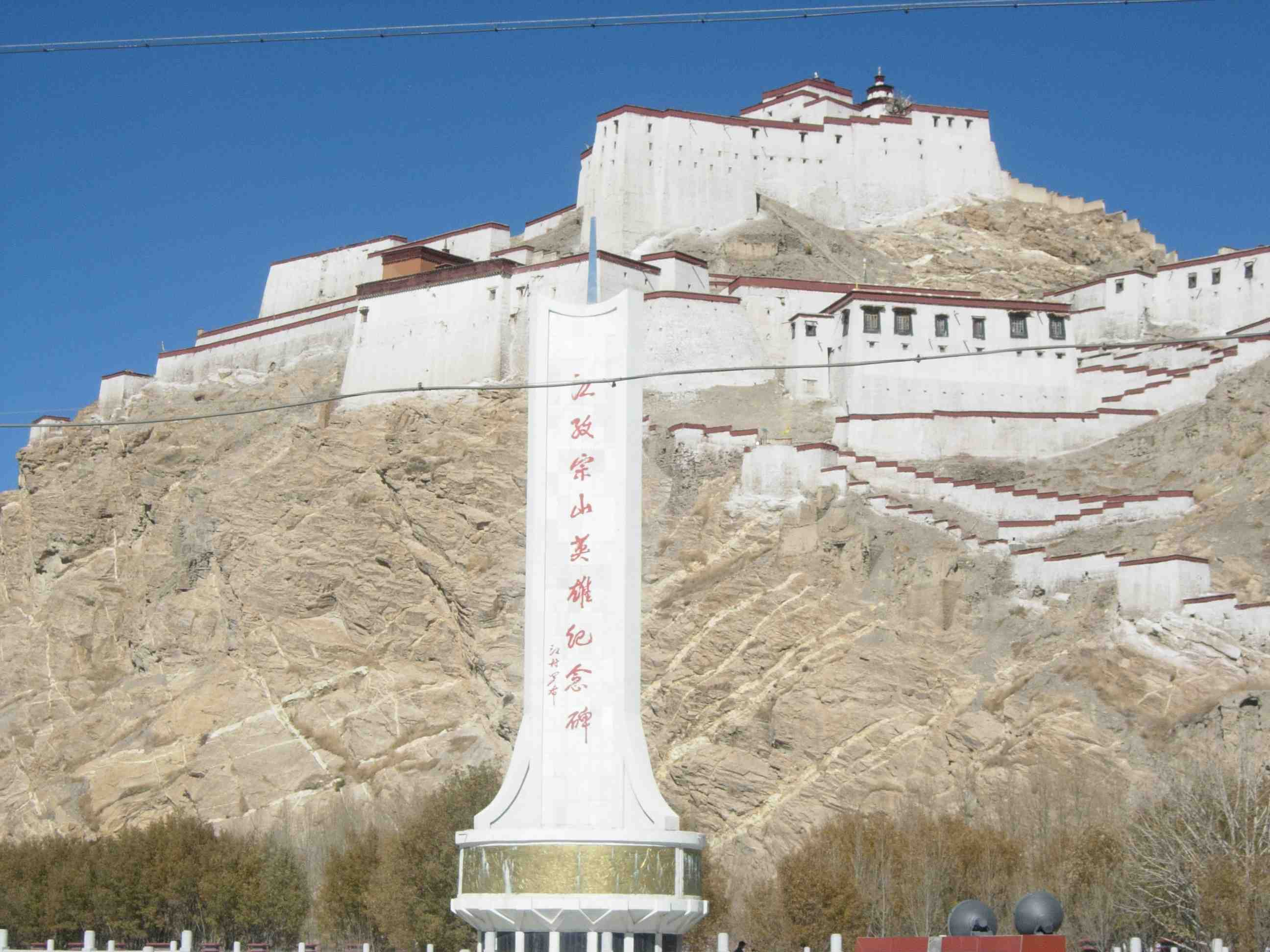
The Gyantse Dzong today

The Gyantse Dzong was a massively protected fortress; defended by the best Tibetan troops and the country's only artillery, it commanded a forbidding position high over the valley below. Macdonald engaged in a "demonstration", a feint directed mainly against the western edges of Gyantse Dzong which would draw Tibetan soldiers away from the southern side of the Dzong which was to be the main object of the attack to come. An artillery bombardment with mountain guns would then create a breach, which would be stormed immediately by his main force. The ancient monastic complex at Tsechen, dating from the fourteenth century, was torched, to prevent its re-occupation by the Tibetans.

The eventual assault on 6 July did not happen as planned, as the Tibetan walls were stronger than expected. General Macdonald's plan was for the infantry to advance in three columns, from the south-west, the south, and south-east. Yet at the opening of the attack there was a near disaster when two columns blundered into each other in the dark. It took eleven hours to break through. The breach was not completed until 4:00 pm, by which time the assault had little time to succeed before nightfall. As Gurkhas and Royal Fusiliers charged the broken wall, they came under heavy fire and suffered some casualties. Gurkha troops climbed the rock directly under the upper ramparts, scaling the rock face as rocks rained down on them and misdirected fire from one of the Maxims hit more of these Gurkhas than Tibetan defenders above them. After several failed attempts to gain the walls, two soldiers broke through a bottleneck under fire despite both being wounded. They gained a foothold which the following troops exploited, enabling the walls to be taken. The Tibetans retreated in good order, allowing the British control of the road to Lhasa, but denying Macdonald a route and thus remaining a constant threat (although never a serious problem) in the British rear for the remainder of the campaign.

The two soldiers who broke the wall at Gyantse Dzong were both well rewarded. Lieutenant John Duncan Grant was given the only Victoria Cross awarded during the expedition, whilst Havildar Kabir Pun received the Indian Order of Merit first class (equivalent to the VC as Indian soldiers were not eligible for VCs until the First World War). Major Wimberley, one of the Medical Officers to the Mission, wrote that though he had seen the Gordons at Dargai he considered "the storming of the breach at Gyantse Dzong by the Gurkhas a far finer performance."

Pillaging by soldiers took place at Palkor Chode, Dongtse and other monasteries after the fall of Gyantse Dzong. Whatever General Orders and the Hague Convention of 1899 may have dictated, looting seemed acceptable if the army felt it had been opposed in any way. According to Major William Beynon, in a letter to his wife on 7 July, some of the pillaging was officially approved — in contrast to claims by Dr Waddell, Brigadier-General Macdonald and his chief of staff, Major Iggulden that monastic sites were "most religiously respected".

=== Entry to Lhasa ===
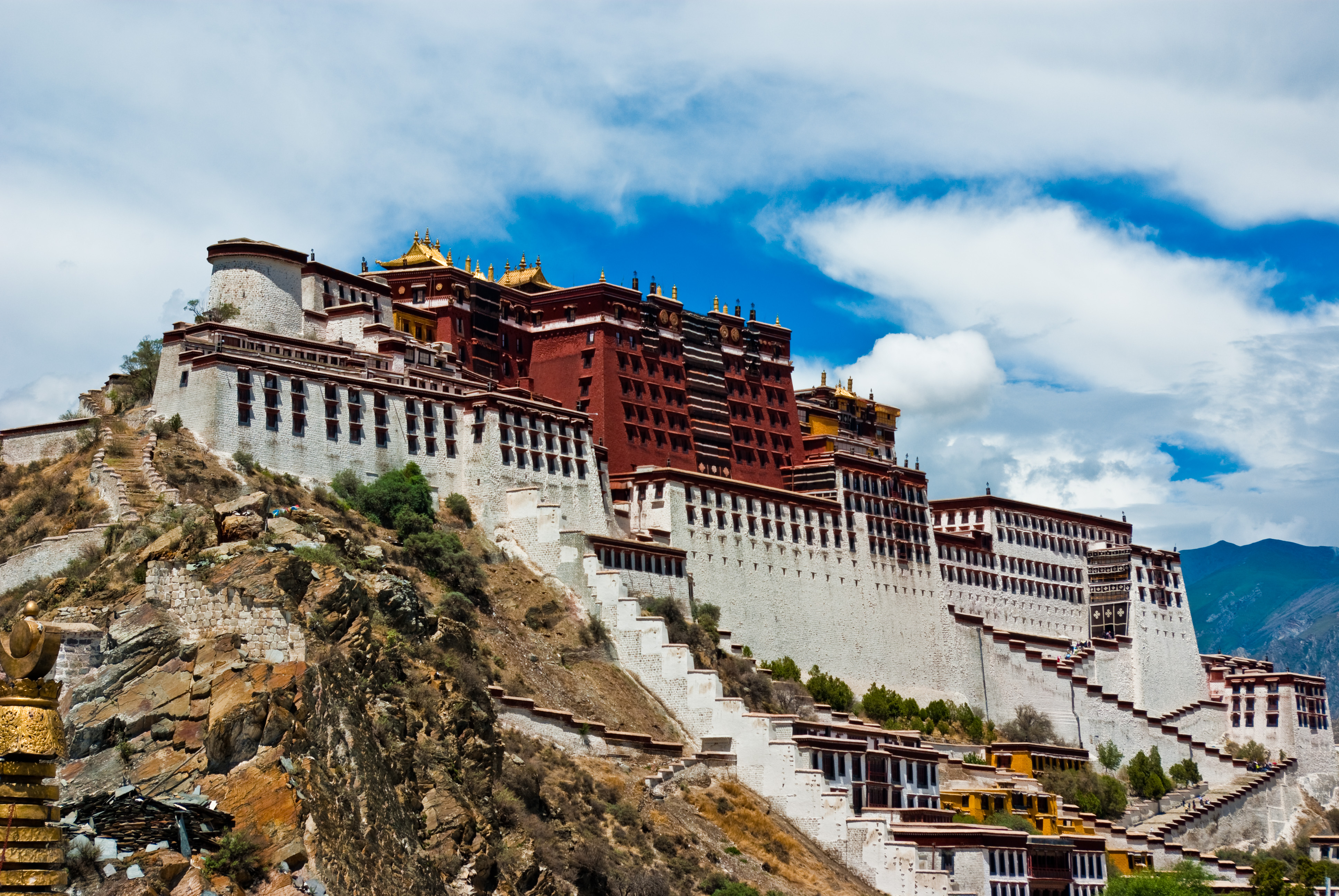
The Potala Palace

On 12 July the sappers pulled down the Tsechen monastery and fort and on 14 July Macdonald's force marched east on the Lhasa road.

At the Karo La, the Wide-Mouthed Pass that had been the scene of fighting two and a half months earlier, the Gurkhas skirmished with a determined group of Tibetan fighters on the heights to the left and right. Essentially however resistance faded before the advance and a policy of scorched earth was adopted – the Tibetans removed what food and fodder they could and emptied villages. Nevertheless, troops could fish in the lakes, where there were also plenty of gulls and redshanks. They passed along the shores of the Yamdok Tso, and reached the fortress of Nakartse, unoccupied except for a party of delegates from Lhasa. Macdonald urged Younghusband to settle the business but Younghusband would negotiate only at Lhasa. By 22 July, the troops camped under the wall of another fortress, Peté Dzong, deserted and in ruins, while Mounted Infantry pushed on ahead to seize the crossing at Chushul Chakzam, the Iron Bridge. On 25 July, the army began to cross the Tsangpo in the wake of the Mounted Infantry, a feat that took four days to achieve.

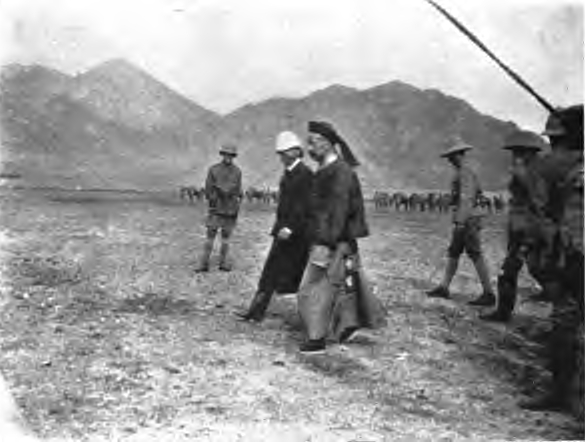
Amban Yu-t'ai with Colonel Younghusband at Lhasa

The force arrived in Lhasa on 3 August 1904 to discover that the thirteenth Dalai Lama had fled to Urga (now Ulaanbaatar), the capital of Outer Mongolia. The Amban escorted the British into the city with his personal guard, but informed them that he had no authority to negotiate with them. The Tibetans told them that only the absent Dalai Lama had authority to sign any accord. The Amban advised the Chinese emperor to depose the Dalai Lama. The Tibetan Council of Ministers and the General Assembly began to submit to pressure on the terms as August progressed, except on the matter of the indemnity which they believed impossibly high for a poor country. Eventually however Younghusband intimidated the regent, Ganden Tri Rinpoche, and the Tsongdu (Tibetan National Assembly), into signing a treaty on 7 September 1904, drafted by himself, known subsequently as the Convention of Lhasa. It was signed, again at Younghusband's insistence, at the Potala Palace. He wrote to his wife that he had been able to "ram the whole treaty down their throats".

=== Anglo-Tibetan Convention of Lhasa ===
The salient points of the Convention of Lhasa of 1904 were as follows:

- The British allowed to trade in Yatung, Gyantse, and Gartok.
- Tibet to pay a large indemnity (7,500,000 rupees, later reduced by two-thirds; the Chumbi Valley to be ceded to Britain until paid).
- Recognition of the Sikkim-Tibet border.
- Tibet to have no relations with any other foreign powers

The size of the indemnity had been the hardest factor to accept for the Tibetan negotiators. The Secretary of State for India, St John Brodrick, had in fact expressed the need for it to be "within the power of the Tibetans to pay" and given Younghusband a free hand to be "guided by circumstances in this matter". Younghusband raised the indemnity demanded from 5,900,000 to 7,500,000 rupees, and further demanded the right for a British trade agent, based at Gyantse, to visit Lhasa "for consultations". It seems that he was still following Lord Curzon's geo-political agenda to extend British influence in Tibet by securing the Chumbi Valley for Britain. Younghusband wanted the payment to be met by yearly installments; it would have taken about 75 years for the Tibetans to clear their debt, and since British occupation of the Chumbi valley was surety until payment was completed, the valley would remain in British hands. Younghusband wrote to his wife immediately after the signing; "I have got Chumbi for 75 years. I have got Russia out for ever". The regent commented that "When one has known the scorpion [meaning China] the frog [meaning Britain] is divine".

The Amban later publicly repudiated the treaty, while Britain announced that it still accepted Chinese claims of authority over Tibet. Acting Viceroy Lord Ampthill reduced the indemnity by two-thirds and considerably eased the terms in other ways. The provisions of this 1904 treaty were revised in the Anglo-Chinese Convention of 1906. The British, for a fee from the Qing court, also agreed "not to annex Tibetan territory or to interfere in the administration of Tibet", while China engaged "not to permit any other foreign state to interfere with the territory or internal administration of Tibet".

=== Conclusion ===
The British mission departed in late September 1904, after a ceremonial presentation of gifts. Britain had "won" and had received the agreements it desired, but without actually receiving any tangible results. The Tibetans had lost the war but had seen China humbled by its failure to defend its client state from foreign incursion, and had pacified the British by signing an unenforceable and largely irrelevant treaty. Captured Tibetan troops were released without condition upon the war's conclusion, many after receiving medical treatment.

It was in fact the reaction in London which was fiercest in condemnation of the war. By the Edwardian period, colonial wars had become increasingly unpopular, and public and political opinion were unhappy about waging war for such minor reasons as those provided by Curzon, and about the beginning battle, which was described in Britain as a deliberate massacre of unarmed men. It was only because of support from King Edward VII that Younghusband, Macdonald, Grant and others were praised for the war. The British lost just 202 men killed in action and 411 to other causes, such as disease. Tibetan casualties have been estimated at between 2,000 and 3,000 killed or fatally wounded.

Though Younghusband, through Curzon's patronage, ascended to the Residency of Kashmir following the campaign, his judgment was no longer trusted, and political decisions on Kashmir and the princely states were made without him. Once Curzon's protection was gone, Younghusband had no future in the Indian political service. In 1908, the position he wanted, that of Chief Commissioner of the North-West Frontier Province, was handed to George Roos-Keppel, and Younghusband retired from India at the age of 46.

== Aftermath ==
The Tibetans were not just unwilling to fulfil the treaty; they were also unable to perform many of its stipulations. Tibet did not have any substantial international trade commodities, and already accepted the borders with its neighbours. Nevertheless, the provisions of the 1904 treaty were confirmed by the 1906 Anglo-Chinese Convention signed between Britain and China. The British, for a fee from the Qing court, also agreed "not to annex Tibetan territory or to interfere in the administration of Tibet", while China engaged "not to permit any other foreign state to interfere with the territory or internal administration of Tibet".

The British invasion was one of the triggers for the 1905 Tibetan Rebellion at Batang monastery, when anti-foreign Tibetan lamas massacred French missionaries, Manchu and Han Qing officials, and Christian converts before the Qing crushed the revolt.

No. 10. Despatch from Consul-General Wilkinson to Sir E. Satow, dated Yünnan-fu, 28th April, 1905. (Received in London 14th June, 1905.) Pere Maire, the Provicaire of the Roman Catholic Mission here, called this morning to show me a telegram which he had just received from a native priest of his Mission at Tali. The telegram, which is in Latin, is dated Tali, the 24th April, and is to the effect that the lamas of Batang have killed PP. Musset and Soulie, together with, it is believed, 200 converts. The chapel at Atentse has been burnt down, and the lamas hold the road to Tachien-lu. Pere Bourdonnec (another member of the French Tibet Mission) begs that Pere Maire will take action. Pere Maire has accordingly written to M. Leduc, my French colleague, who will doubtless communicate with the Governor-General. The Provicaire is of opinion that the missionaries were attacked by orders of the ex-Dalai Lama, as the nearest Europeans on whom he could avenge his disgrace. He is good enough to say that he will give me any further information which he may receive. I am telegraphing to you the news of the massacre.

I have, &c., (Signed) W. H. WILKINSON. East India (Tibet): Papers Relating to Tibet [and Further Papers ...], Issues 2–4, Great Britain. Foreign Office, p. 12.

Contemporary documents show that the British continued to occupy the Chumbi Valley until 8 February 1908, after having received the full payment of the indemnity from China.

In early 1910, Qing China sent a military expedition of its own to Tibet for direct rule. However, the Qing dynasty was overthrown in the Xinhai Revolution, which began in October 1911. Although the Chinese forces departed once more in 1913, the First World War and the Russian Revolution isolated the now independent Tibet, reducing Western influence and interest. Ineffectual regents ruled during the 14th Dalai Lama's infancy and China began to reassert its control, a process that culminated in 1950–1951 with the Chinese invasion of Tibet by a newly formed Communist China.

The position of British Trade Agent at Gyangzê was occupied from 1904 until 1944. It was not until 1937, with the creation of the position of "Head of British Mission Lhasa", that a British officer had a permanent posting in Lhasa itself.

The British seem to have misread the military and diplomatic situation, for the Russians did not have the designs on India that the British imagined, and the campaign was politically redundant before it began. Russian arms in Tibet amounted to no more than thirty Russian government rifles, and the whole narrative of Russian influence, and the Czar's ambitions, was dropped. The defeats the Russians experienced in the Russo-Japanese War that began in February 1904 further altered perceptions of the balance of power in Asia, and the Russian threat. However, it has been argued that the campaign had "a profound effect upon Tibet, changing it forever, and for the worse at that, doing much to contribute to Tibet's loss of innocence."

== Subsequent interpretations ==
Many Chinese historians have written concerning the expedition an image of Tibetans heroically opposing the expeditionary force out of loyalty not to Tibet, but to China. This particular school of Chinese historiography asserts that the British interest in trade and resolving the Tibet-Sikkim border disputes was a pretext for annexing the whole Tibet region into British India, which was a step towards the ultimate goal of annexing all of China. They also assert that the Tibetans annihilated the British forces, and that Younghusband escaped only with a small retinue. The Chinese government has turned Gyantze Dzong into a "Resistance Against the British Museum", promoting these views, as well as other themes such as the brutal living conditions endured by Tibetan serfs who supposedly loved their motherland (China).

Meanwhile, many Tibetans look back to it as an exercise of Tibetan self-defence and an act of independence from the Qing dynasty as the dynasty was falling apart, and its growing disdain for China in the aftermath due to ruthless repression of Tibetans at 1905.

The British writer and popular historian Charles Allen has remarked that, although the Younghusband Mission did inflict "considerable material damage on Tibet and its people", it was damage that paled into insignificance when compared "to the invasion of Tibet by the Chinese People's Liberation Army in 1951 and the Cultural Revolution of 1966–1967".

== See also ==
- British military personnel of the British expedition to Tibet
- Chinese expedition to Tibet (1720)
- Chinese expedition to Tibet (1910)
- Red River Valley, a 1997 Chinese movie about the events of the British expedition to Tibet
- Sikkim expedition
- Sinicisation of Tibet
- Tibetan expedition of Islamic Bengal
- The Great Game
- Tibetan government in exile
- Tibet under Qing rule
- John Duncan Grant
- Perceval Landon
- Frederick Percival Mackie

== Bibliography ==
Scholarly sources

- The Question of Tibet and the Rule of Law (PDF). Geneva: International Commission of Jurists. 1959.
- Lamb, Alastair (1989). Tibet, China & India 1914-1950: A History of Imperial Diplomacy. Hertingfordbury, Hertfordshire: Roxford Books. ISBN 978-0-907129-03-5.
- McKay, Alex (1997). Tibet and the British Raj: the frontier cadre, 1904-1947. London studies on South Asia. Richmond, Surrey: Curzon Press. ISBN 978-0-7007-0627-3.
- McKay, Alex (2003). The history of Tibet. London; New York: RoutledgeCurzon. ISBN 978-0-7007-1508-4. OCLC 50494840.
- Mehra, Parshotam (1974). The McMahon Line and after: a study of the triangular contest on India's Northeastern frontier between Britain, China and Tibet, 1904-47. Delhi: Macmillan Inc. ISBN 978-0-333-15737-4.
- Mehra, Parshotam (January 2007). "Britain and Tibet: From the Eighteenth Century to the Transfer of Power". Indian Historical Review. 34 (1): 270–282. doi:10.1177/037698360703400111. ISSN 0376-9836. S2CID 141011277.
- Powers, John; Holzinger, Lutz (2004). History as propaganda: Tibetan exiles versus the People's Republic of China. Oxford: Oxford Univ. Press. ISBN 978-0-19-517426-7.
- Stewart, Gordon T. (2009). Journeys to empire: enlightenment, imperialism, and British encounters with Tibet, 1774-1904 (PDF). Cambridge: Cambridge University Press. ISBN 978-0-521-73568-1.

General books

- Allen, Charles (2004). Duel in the snows: the true story of the Younghusband mission to Lhasa. London: John Murray. ISBN 978-0-7195-5427-8. OCLC 53709120.
  - Allen, Charles (2015). Duel in the Snows. London: John Murray Press. ISBN 978-1-4736-2754-3.
- Candler, Edmund (1905). The unveiling of Lhasa. London: T. Nelson & Sons. OCLC 5660019.
- Fleming, Peter (1961). Bayonets to Lhasa; the first full account of the British invasion of Tibet in 1904. New York: Harper. OCLC 1629211.
- French, Patrick (1994). Younghusband: the last great imperial adventurer. London: HarperCollins. ISBN 978-0-00-215733-9.
- Herbert, Edwin (2003). Small wars and skirmishes 1902-18: early twentieth-century colonial campaigns in Africa, Asia, and the Americas: political background and campaign narratives, organisation, tactics and terrain, dress and weapons, command and control, and historical effects. Nottingham: Foundry Books. ISBN 978-1-901543-05-6. OCLC 54046889.
- Bethel, Leonard Arthur (1932). 'Blackwood' Tales from the Outposts. Vol. 1. Frontiers of Empire. Edinburgh: William Blackwood and Sons. pp. 21–66. OL 45745437M. Bethell was a member of the expedition. See 'A Footnote'
- Hopkirk, Peter (1994). The great game: the struggle for empire in central Asia. New York: Kodansha. ISBN 978-1-56836-022-5.; as: The Great Game: the struggle for empire in central Asia)
- Chisholm, Hugh, ed. (1911). "Tibet" . Encyclopædia Britannica. Vol. 12 (11th ed.). Cambridge University Press. pp. 916–928.

Primary sources

- Bell, Charles (1924). Tibet Past and Present. Oxford: Oxford University Press. OCLC 2140571.
- Mehra, Parshotam (1979). The North-Eastern frontier: a documentary study of the internecine rivalry between India, Tibet and China. Vol. 1: 1906-14. Dehli: Oxford University Press. ISBN 978-0-19-561158-8.
- Mehra, Parshotam (1980). The North-Eastern frontier: a documentary study of the internecine rivalry between India, Tibet and China. Vol. 2: 1914-54. Dehli: Oxford University Press. ISBN 978-0-19-561225-7.
