= Edmund Candler =

English journalist, novelist and educator

Edmund Candler (1874–1926) was an English journalist, novelist and educator notable for his literary depictions of colonial India. His fictional tropes and settings are comparable in many ways to those of Rudyard Kipling, a writer whom he self-consciously imitated.

== Life ==
Candler was educated at Repton School and Emmanuel College, Cambridge, where he graduated in classics in 1895. Candler embarked on a career in India which was to last intermittently for the next twenty-five years. He aimed to finance his literary ambitions by teaching, and was first employed by a school at Darjeeling in the Himalayan foothills. It was on the other side of the great range that he would first achieve prominence as a writer, after gaining an appointment as the Daily Mail correspondent accompanying the expeditionary force led by Sir Francis Younghusband into Tibet in 1903-4. His experiences in Tibet, including witnessing the storming of the Gyantse Dzong, later provided material for his travelogue The Mantle of the East and the short story 'At Galdang-Tso.' His account of the expedition, for which he is today principally known, was published in 1905 as The Unveiling of Lhasa. He returned to teaching in India but resigned his post at Manikpur in Bengal in a heightened atmosphere of political unrest following the Alipore Bomb Case. He claims in his autobiography that he resolved to leave after finding a death-threat lying on his desk. Preferring the politically quiescent atmosphere of a princely state, he took up the post of Principal at Mohindra College, Patiala. He left Patiala to serve as a war correspondent during the 1914–1918 War, and reported on the British capture of Baghdad for the Manchester Guardian in 1917. On returning to India he was appointed Director of Publicity for the Punjab in 1919, a position which he held until his permanent retirement to England in 1921.

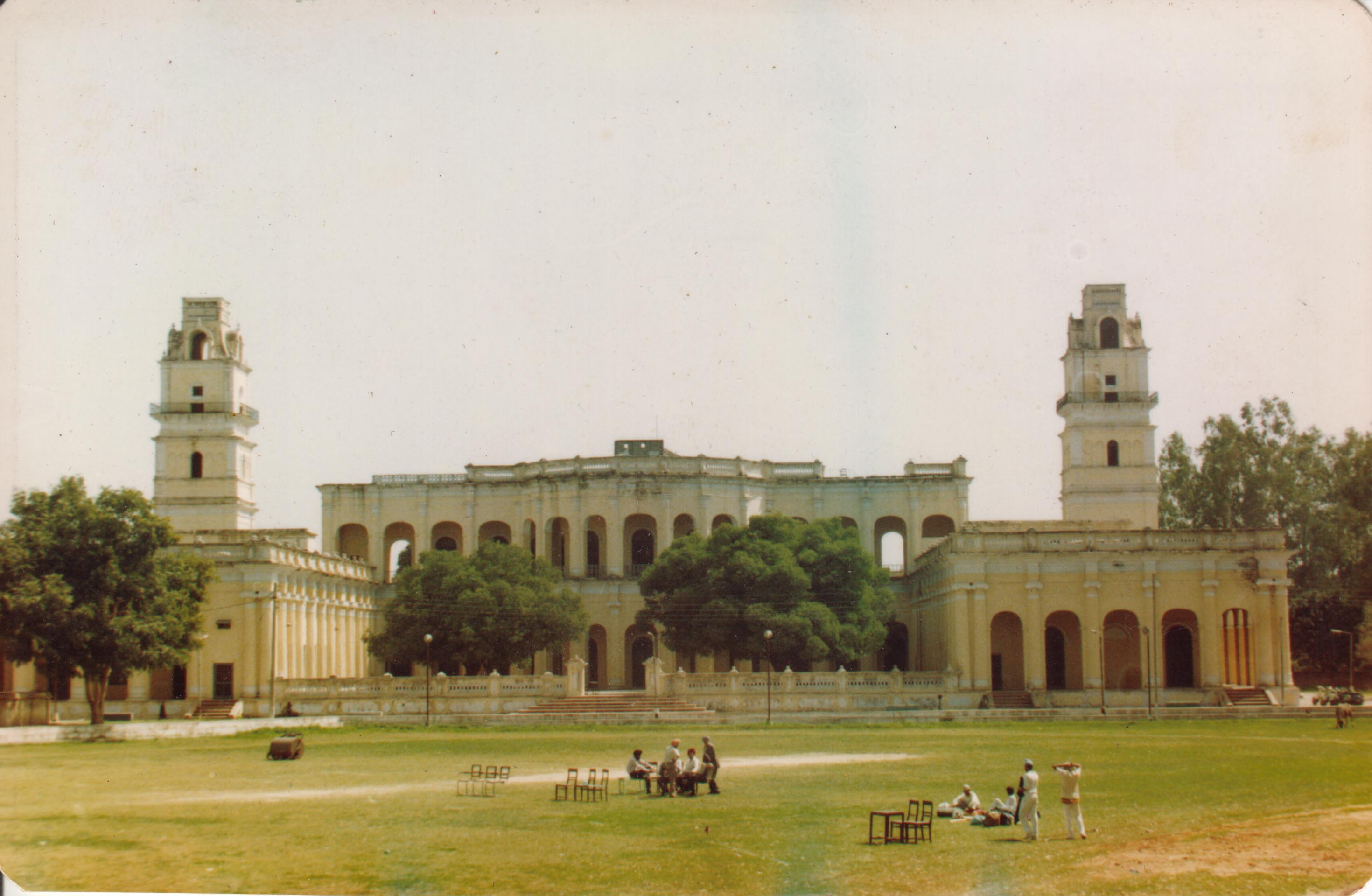
Mohindra College, Patiala

In comparison with most of the British population in India at the time Candler held some startlingly liberal and sympathetic views of Indian nationalism. Although he does regard the political resistance of his Bengali students with a very serious eye, he concedes in his autobiography that put in their position he too would seek a means of overthrowing imperial rule. However the lack of trust in those whom he wished to educate ultimately led him to despair of ever enjoying intimate friendship with Indians and to abandon hope in the British Empire as a civilising project. Disillusioned, he became gradually embedded in the political conservatism of 'Anglo-Indian' club society, and in 1913 his fellow-author E.M. Forster found him in the "loneliness and isolation of his life at Patiala" a cantankerous and creatively parched figure. Candler's work, most notably his self-portrait as the schoolmaster Skene in the novel Siri Ram: Revolutionist, registers “the passage from romantic expectations to a disappointed acceptance of the unease which English and Indian generated in each other measures the distance between a traveller’s fantasies … and a white resident’s experiences.”

== Writings ==
In a letter of 1909 to his brother he writes that in his more confident moments he feels that “my stuff reeks of India more than any stuff but Kipling’s.” Kipling had left India for the last time in 1891, and his admirer Candler self-consciously follows in his footsteps, literary and literal. The Kiplingesque image of India as a grandiose and irrational land comes naturally to Candler, and when describing locations significant in Kipling’s own fiction, such as Benares (Varanasi), he applies imaginative treatments and tropes such as the heroic, Romantic or Gothic to some degree pre-fabricated for him by his master. On some occasions he in fact cites Kipling directly. Kipling's fiction forms hence a palimpsest in which Candler, for all his considerable talent, is heavily enmeshed. He shows awareness however that India, which was by his time much further advanced upon its own project of self-definition, is no longer subject to British definitions. His major work of fiction, the novel Siri Ram: Revolutionist, shows a writer caught awkwardly between his great predecessor and his own original and perceptive, if jaded, view of Indian youth. The novel arguably registers the passing of the ‘High Noon’ of the British Empire.

== Works ==
- Edmund Candler, A Vagabond in Asia, Greening & Co. (London, 1900)
- Edmund Candler, The Unveiling of Lhasa, E. Arnold (London, 1905)
- Edmund Candler, The Mantle of the East, William Blackwood & Sons, (Edinburgh; London, 1910)
- Edmund Candler, The General Plan, W. Blackwood (Edinburgh, 1911),
  - (including ‘A Break in the Rains’ and ‘At Galdang Tso’)
- Edmund Candler, Siri Ram – Revolutionist: A Transcript from Life, Constable & Co. (London, 1914)
- Edmund Candler, The Long Road to Baghdad, Cassell and Company, (London, 1919) Vol. I Vol.II
- Edmund Candler, The Sepoy, John Murray, (London, 1919)
- Edmund Candler, Youth and the East: An Unconventional Autobiography, W. Blackwood (London and Edinburgh, 1924)
