= Tibet Frontier Commission =

Diplomatic Commission during the British expedition in Tibet

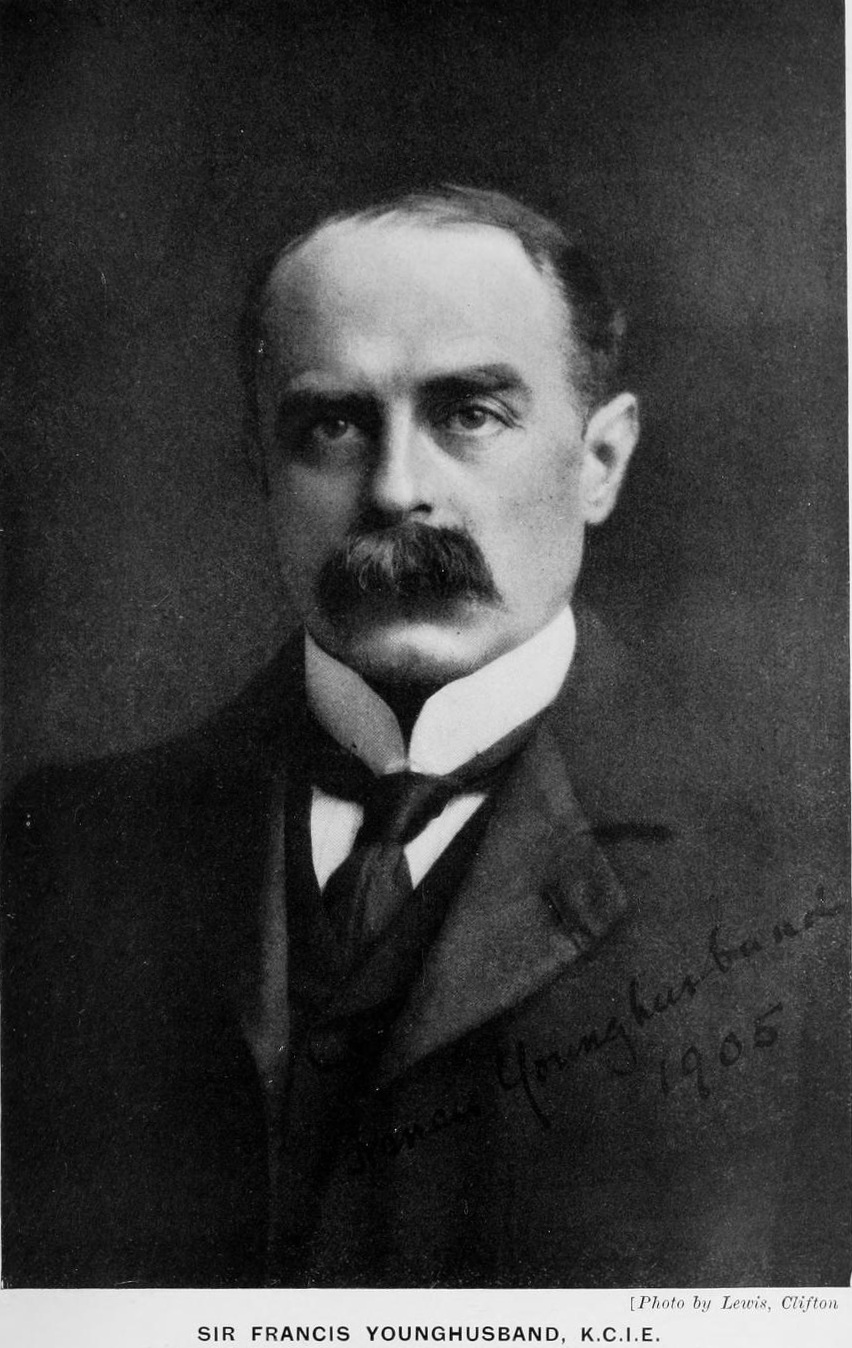
Sir Francis Younghusband, the leader of the commission.

The Tibet Frontier Commission headed the British expedition to Tibet in 1903–04. The Commission comprised seven diplomats and army officers, led by Colonel Francis Younghusband. Despatched on the orders of Lord Curzon, Viceroy of India, the commission was intended to establish diplomatic relations with the government of Tibet and, in particular, to resolve the dispute over the border between Tibet and Sikkim. The commission was escorted by a large military force led by Brigadier-General J. R. L. Macdonald. However, the expedition was met with hostility by a Tibetan government uninterested in negotiation, and conflicts erupted, with the antiquated Tibetan army which was mostly armed with matchlocks and scythes proving no match for a professional army equipped with Maxim machine guns.

Captain Herbert James Walton served as Medical Officer and Naturalist to the commission, and was able to make a comprehensive study of the flora and fauna of the southern and central areas of Tibet during the expedition's slow progress to the capital, Lhasa.

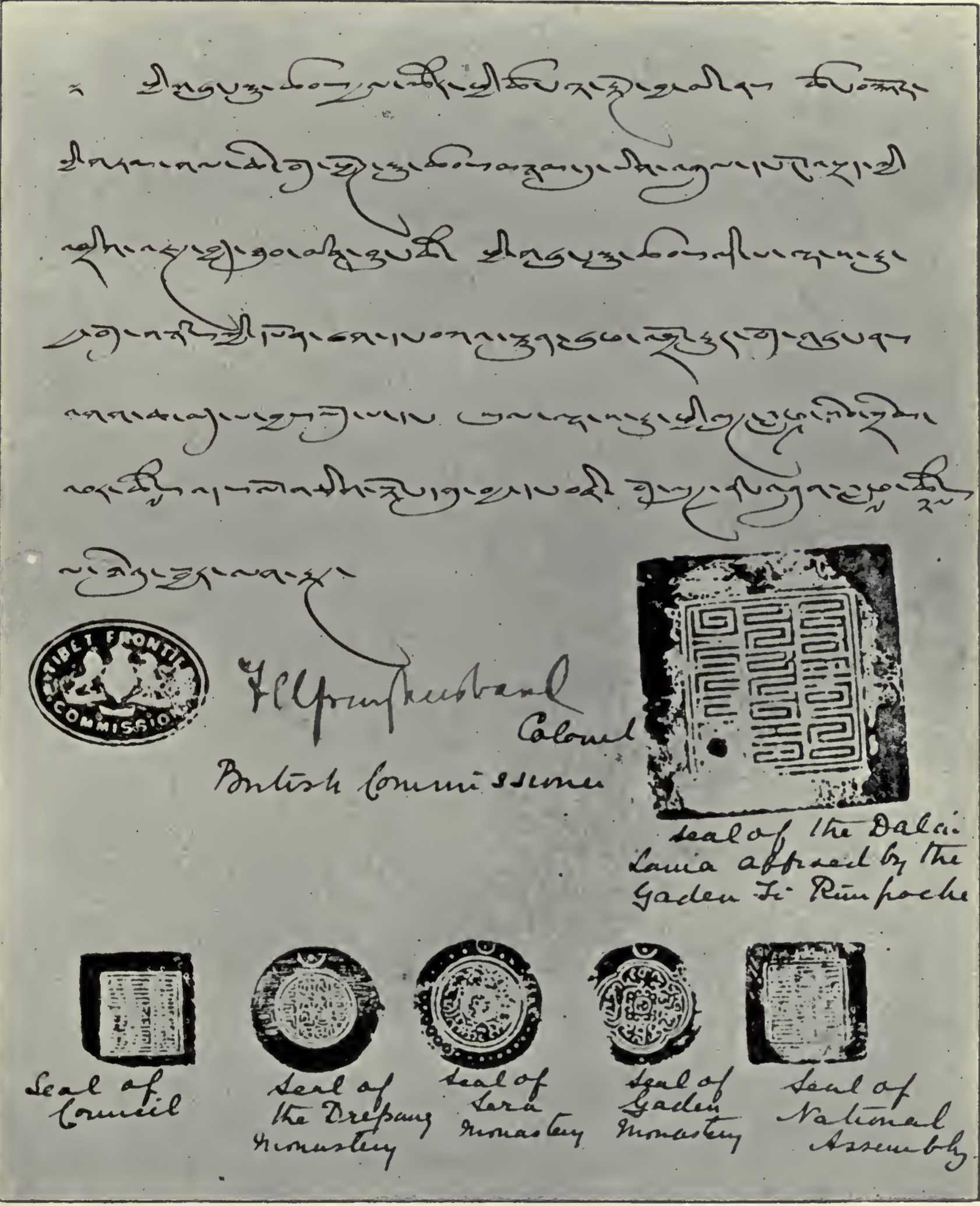
The seal of the Tibet Frontier Commission as seen on the Convention of Lhasa

== Members ==
- Colonel Francis E. Younghusband, CLE (British Commissioner to Tibet)
- Mr. J. Claude White, Political Officer of Sikkim (Deputy-Commissioner)
- Mr. E. C. Wilton, Chinese Consular Service (Deputy-Commissioner)
- Capt. W. F. T. O'Connor (Secretary and Interpreter)
- Capt. H. J. Walton, I.M.S. (Medical Officer and Naturalist)
- Mr. H. H. Hayden (Geologist)
- Mr. Vernon Magniac (Private Secretary to the Commissioner)
