= Herbert James Walton =

English surgeon and naturalist

Herbert Walton (19 January 1869 – 4 May 1938) was an English surgeon and naturalist. Born in London on 19 January 1869, he was the second child and elder son of James Sydney Walton and Eleanor Georgina Louissan, his wife. Walton was initially educated in Paris, before entering private schools in England, culminating in Charterhouse (1881–84); he went on to study medicine at St Bartholomew's Hospital.

== Career ==
Walton's first post was as assistant house surgeon at the Salop Infirmary, Shrewsbury. He graduated with honours at the M.B. examination at the University of London, and later won the gold medal at the M.D. He went on to join the Netley Hospital before passing first into the Indian Medical Service. He was gazetted lieutenant on 29 July 1896, winning both the Montefiore Prize for military surgery, and the Martin Memorial Medal for military medicine. Choosing to serve in Bengal, Walton served on the North West Frontier in 1897–98, and in China in 1900 during the Relief of Peking.

=== Tibet Expedition ===
In 1903–4, Walton was appointed a member of the Tibet Frontier Commission, acting as both medical officer and naturalist to the British Expedition to Tibet. The mission temporarily established its headquarters at Changlo Manor, just outside Gyantse, where Walton took it upon himself to attend to the needs of the local populace, notably performing operations to correct cleft palates, a particularly common affliction in Tibet.

Walton's copious notes on the flora and fauna of Tibet are compiled in Landon's The Opening of Tibet; he also discovered and collected the rare Buddleja tibetica.

=== Military ranks ===
Walton was promoted captain in 1899, major 1908, and finally lieutenant-colonel in 1916. He served with the army until May 1905, when he was appointed civil surgeon to the United Provinces (now Uttar Pradesh). He briefly held the post of Chair of Pathology at King George's Medical College, Lucknow, before reverting to military service in 1915.

=== Retirement ===
Walton retired in 1919, returning to England and settling in Godalming, where he died in 1938. He never married.

== Published works ==
- Walton, H. J. Appendix A: Notes on the natural history of southern Tibet, in: Landon, P. (1905). The Opening of Tibet, p. 419–432. Doubleday, Page & Co., New York.

== Eponymy ==
Artemisia waltoni J. R. Drumm. ex Pampanini, discovered and collected by Walton at Gyangtse on the British Expedition to Tibet, was named for him by the Scottish botanist James Drummond, curator of the herbarium at the Calcutta Royal Botanic Gardens.
