= Perceval Landon =

English writer, traveller and journalist

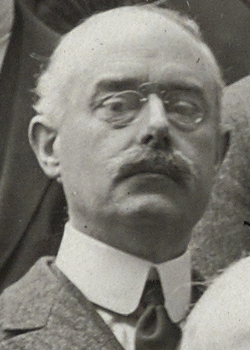
Perceval Landon in May 1919.

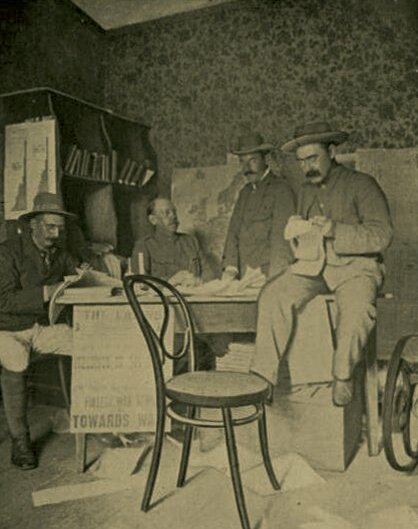
Landon, second from the right, in hat.

Perceval Landon (1869–1927) was an English writer, traveller and journalist, now best remembered for his classic and much reprinted ghost story Thurnley Abbey.

== Family ==
Perceval Landon was born in Hastings on 29 March 1869. He was the son of the Rev. Edward Henry Landon and his wife, Caroline. His first name was the surname of his mother, daughter of the Rev. and Hon. Arthur Philip Perceval, through whom he was collaterally related to Spencer Perceval. His own family of Landon was of French Huguenot descent, having migrated to London in the 1680s at the time of the revocation of the Edict of Nantes.

== Life and career ==
He was educated at Forest School and Hertford College, Oxford. He matriculated in October 1888, obtained Third Class Honours in Classical Moderations in 1890, and graduated with Third Class Honours in Law in 1892. While at Oxford, he was one of the original subscribers to John Woodward and George Burnett's Treatise on Heraldry British and Foreign (1892), and he had a lifelong interest in heraldry. He was Secretary of the Oxford Union in 1891.

He was called to the Bar by the Inner Temple but in 1899–1900 he was War Correspondent of The Times during the South African War. He was also involved, with his close and lifelong friend Rudyard Kipling and others, in a daily paper called The Friend started by Lord Roberts in Bloemfontein during the Boer War. This South African experience launched a career of world travel, journalism, and other writing, so that he described himself in Who's Who as "special correspondent, dramatist, and author".

At a meeting of the Royal Society of Arts in 1915, Lord Curzon of Kedleston, former Viceroy of India, described Landon as "a writer of exceptional ability on Eastern and other questions" and "an authority second to none on the geography and politics of what was commonly called the Middle East."

His best known non-fiction work is The opening of Tibet (1905), which he wrote after joining the British expedition to Tibet in 1903–1904; the book is subtitled "an account of Lhasa and the country and people of central Tibet and of the progress of the mission sent there by the English government in the year 1903-4". In this book, Landon was one of the first Europeans to describe the holy city of Lhasa in detail.

He was also the author of a book of 13 original short stories, Raw Edges, published by William Heinemann, London, in 1908, with lithograph illustrations by Alberto Martini. The most successful and enduring of these stories was Thurnley Abbey; but also included were psychological suspense stories Railhead and The Gyroscope (which is about a horrifying juggernaut running amok in a crowded auditorium).

Landon was private secretary to the Governor of New South Wales William Lygon, 7th Earl Beauchamp, 1900. In 1898 he and Beauchamp had holidayed in Paris. In 1903 he was special correspondent of the Daily Mail at the Delhi Durbar, in China, in Japan and in Siberia; in 1903–1904 he was special correspondent of The Times on the British military expedition to Lhasa, Tibet; in 1905–1906 he was special correspondent of The Times for the Prince of Wales' visit to India; and after that he was in Persia, India, and Nepal, 1908; Russian Turkestan 1909; Egypt and Sudan 1910; on the North Eastern Frontier of India and at the Delhi Durbar, 1911; in Mesopotamia and Syria, 1912; in Scandinavia and behind the British and French lines in 1914–1915; behind the Italian lines and to the Vatican in 1917 (the war and Vatican visits with Kipling); at the Paris Peace Conference, 1919; in Constantinople, 1920; in India, Mesopotamia, Syria, and Palestine 1921; on the Prince of Wales' tour of India and Japan, 1921–1922; in China and North America 1922; at the Peace Conference in Lausanne, 1923; in China, Nepal and Egypt 1924; and in China in 1925 (source except where noted: Who Was Who).

By this time, in 1925, Landon was 57 and had travelled constantly since the age of 21. Landon from 1912 had the use of Keylands, a cottage in the grounds of Kipling's house, Batemans, in Sussex. His London residence was, from 1907, at Pall Mall Place, St James's, and, by the time of his death in 1927, his final address (from Who's Who) was 1 The Studios, Gunter Grove, Chelsea, London.

On 22 January 1927, his old friend Rudyard Kipling wrote to his former employer Lord Beauchamp saying Landon had "crocked badly", blaming "exposure and over-work". He asked Beauchamp to "keep a kindly eye on him" while Kipling was sailing to South America and added, in a postscript, "If when he gets better, he has to go on a milk and egg diet, you could see that he gets good country stuff. I can't arrange this from my farms, in my absence."

But Landon died, a day later, on 23 January 1927. He was unmarried.

Kipling was too upset to go to the funeral, but his poem A Song in the Desert "was a lament for a friend he had loved". The poem is dedicated: "P. L. OB. JAN. 1927". The Kipling Society says it reflects "his many travels in the wild places of the world, his uncomplaining endurance of dangers and discomforts, his magical tales, lightly told, and his shrewd criticism of Kipling's own work".

== Thurnley Abbey ==
Landon's ghost story Thurnley Abbey was originally published in 1908 in his book Raw Edges. It has been reprinted in many modern anthologies, including The 2nd Fontana Book of Great Ghost Stories, The Penguin Book of Horror Stories, and The Dark Horse Book of Hauntings. It is reminiscent of the stories of M.R. James, who himself called it "almost too horrid". According to Neil Wilson, it "is ranked by some as one of the greatest ghost stories ever written. Landon's achievement is all the more impressive because of his use of well-worn subject matter. The tale's masterful development of atmosphere is a model of how even clichéd material can be given a new lease of life in the hands of a skilled writer." Ramsey Campbell called the story "That most terrifying of English ghost stories". He reprinted it in his anthology Fine Frights: Stories That Scared Me (NT: Tor Books, 1988)

A man named Alastair Colvin is travelling on a boat with the narrator, and asks the narrator if he can sleep in his cabin, even though he has his own. The narrator is surprised by this but Colvin then narrates his tale which involves his travelling to Thurnley Abbey, recently inherited by Colvin's friend, John Broughton, who has recently taken ownership of the old abbey. A Mr. Clarke, the old retainer who had lived at the Abbey for many years, is reputed to have put about that a ghost haunts the Abbey, and seemed to have delighted in the fear that this had caused. Locals believe it, and though the new owner makes light of it, he seems not to be entirely convinced that it is not true, and after arranging for Colvin to stay overnight, asks him to "talk to it" if he sees a ghost. Colvin spends the night in the house and encounters the ghost – an experience which changes his life. Henceforth he is afraid to sleep alone.

Raw Edges also included the ghost story "Mrs Rivers's Journal" which Hugh Lamb has reprinted in his anthologies Gaslight Nightmares 2 and "Gaslit Horror".

== Medals ==
In 2015, a group of 7 medals awarded to Landon on various occasions was offered for sale by Dix Noonan Webb (auctioneers of Bolton Street, Piccadilly, London), catalogued as: "A fine and important campaign group of six awarded to Perceval Landon", consisting of (1) Queen's South Africa Medal [Boer War] 1899–1902, officially impressed with Mr. P. Landon. "Times"; (2) Tibet 1903–04 Medal, officially engraved with P. Landon Esq: Press Corspdt.; (3)-(5) 1914–15 Star Trio of medals P. Landon. (First World War; consisting of the 1914–15 Star, the British War Medal and the Victory Medal); (6) Coronation Medal 1911, unnamed, together with, (7), a separate Royal Society of Arts Silver Prize Medal, G.V.R., 55mm, the edge inscribed Perceval Landon, for his paper on "Basra and the Shatt-Ul-Arab" Session 1914–15.

== Publications ==
As well as his journalism, Landon published the following books:

- Heliotropes, or New Posies for Sundials, written in an old book partly in English and partly in Latin (1908)
- The opening of Tibet; an account of Lhasa and the country and people of central Tibet and of the progress of the mission sent there by the English government in the year 1903-4 (1905)
- Lhasa, v. I and II (1905)
- Under the Sun: impressions of Indian cities (1906)
- 1857, The Story of the Indian Mutiny (1907)
- Raw Edges; studies and stories of these days (1908)
- For the Soul of the King (translated from the French, 1909)
- The House Opposite (play; produced at the Queen's Theatre, London, 1910)
- Nepal (1928).
- Percival Landon's History of Nepal
