= Kumbum =

Type of Tibetan Buddhist temple

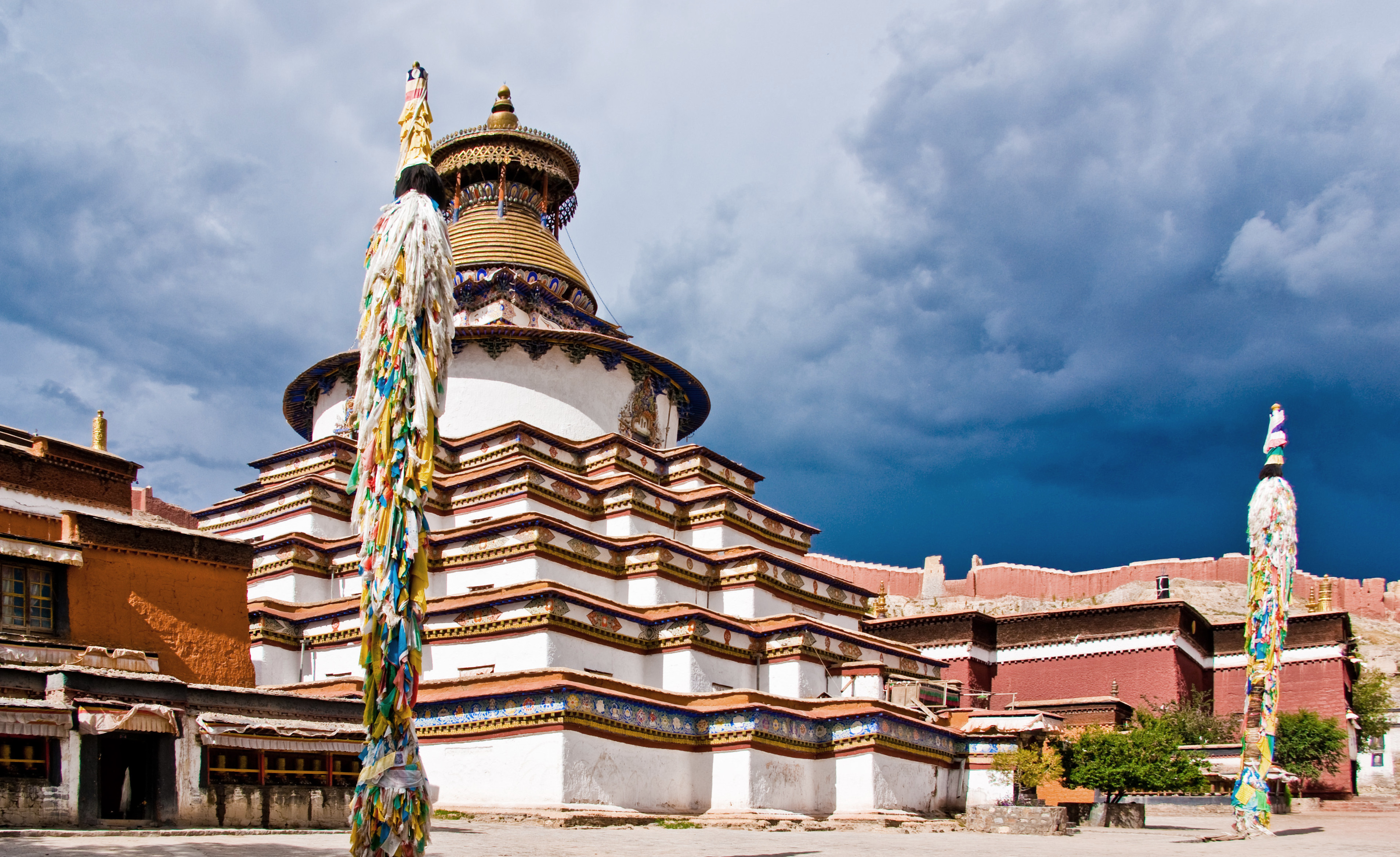
The Kumbum of Gyantse, often regarded as the most well-known Kumbum

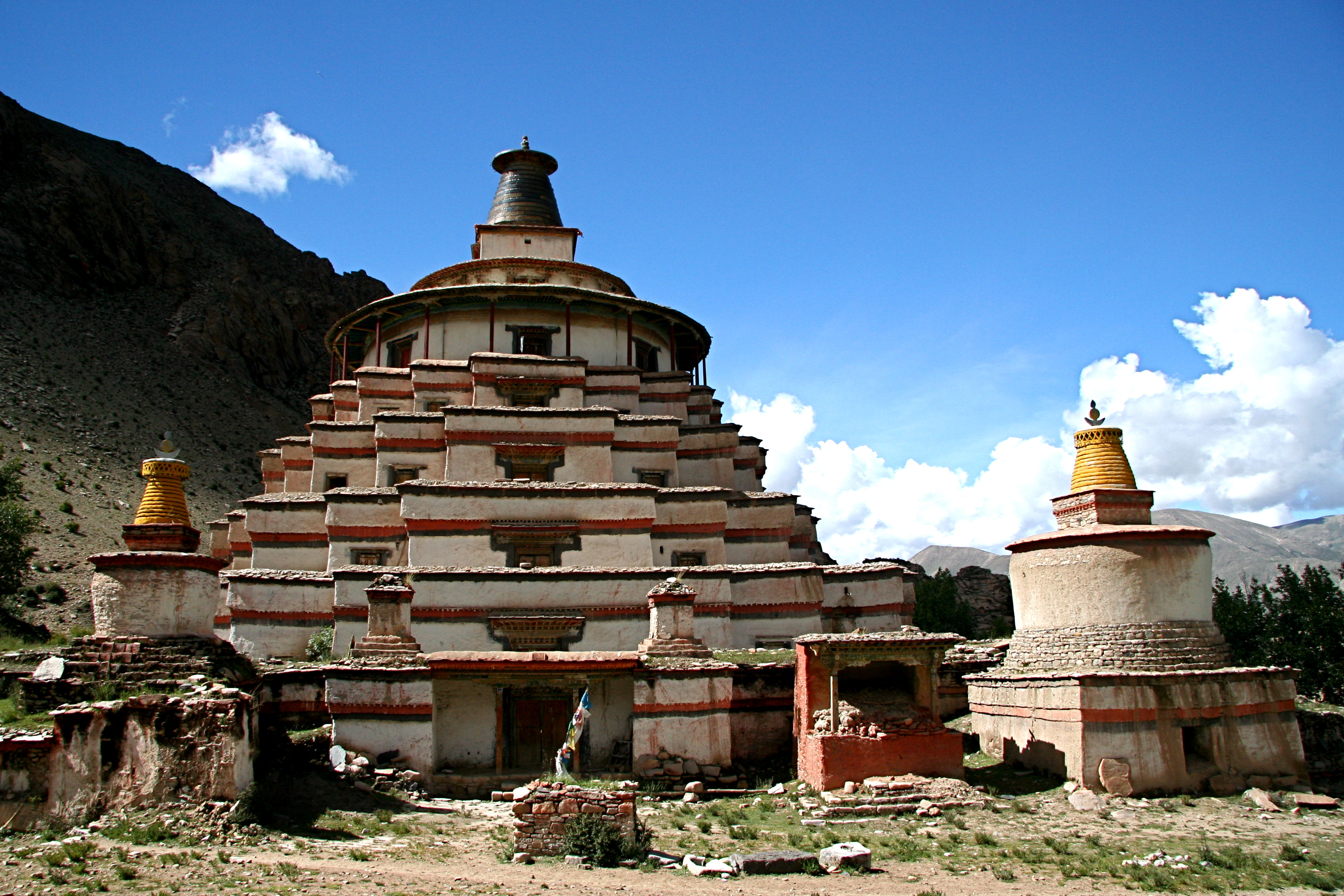
Kumbum of Jonang or Jomonang

A Kumbum (Tibetan: སྐུ་འབུམ་, Wylie: sku 'bum "one hundred thousand holy images") is a multi-storied aggregate of Buddhist chapels in Tibetan Buddhism. The most famous Kumbum forms part of Palcho Monastery.

The first Kumbum was founded in the fire sheep year 1427 by a Gyantse prince. It has nine lhakangs or levels, is 35 metres (115 ft) high surmounted by a golden dome, and contains 77 chapels which line its walls. Many of the statues were damaged during the Cultural Revolution but have since been replaced with clay images, though they lack the artistic merit of the originals. The 14th century murals showing Newar and Chinese influences, survived much better.

The Kumbum or great gomang ("many-doored") stupa at Gyantse is a three-dimensional mandala meant to portray the Buddhist cosmos. The Kumbum, like other mandalas, which are portrayed by a circle within a square, enables the devotee to take part in the Buddhist perception of the universe and can depict one's potential as they move through it. Mandalas are meant to aid an individual on the path to enlightenment. The Kumbum holds a vast number of images of deities throughout its structure with Vajradhara (Sanskrit:Vajradhāra, Tibetan: rdo rje 'chang (Dorje Chang), English: Vajraholder), the cosmic Buddha, at the top.

"The lhakangs of the nine levels of the Kumbum, decreasing in number at each level, are structured according to the compendium of Sakya tantras called Drubtab Kantu. Thus each lhakang and each level creates a mandala, and the entire Kumbum represents a three-dimensional path to the Buddha's enlightenment in terms of increasingly subtle tantric mandalas."

The best known Kumbum is the Gyantse Kumbum, built in 1497 by a prince of Gyantse, but there are other surviving examples at Jonang or Jomonang, built by Dolpopa Sherab Gyaltsen and consecrated in 1333, and the Chung Riwoche Kumbum at Päl Riwoche, which was built by Thang Tong Gyalpo, who began work on it in 1449. A further one is at Kumbum Monastery near Xining in Qinghai. The Great Stupa of Universal Compassion being built near Bendigo, Australia is modelled on the Gyantse Kumbum.

== Gallery ==
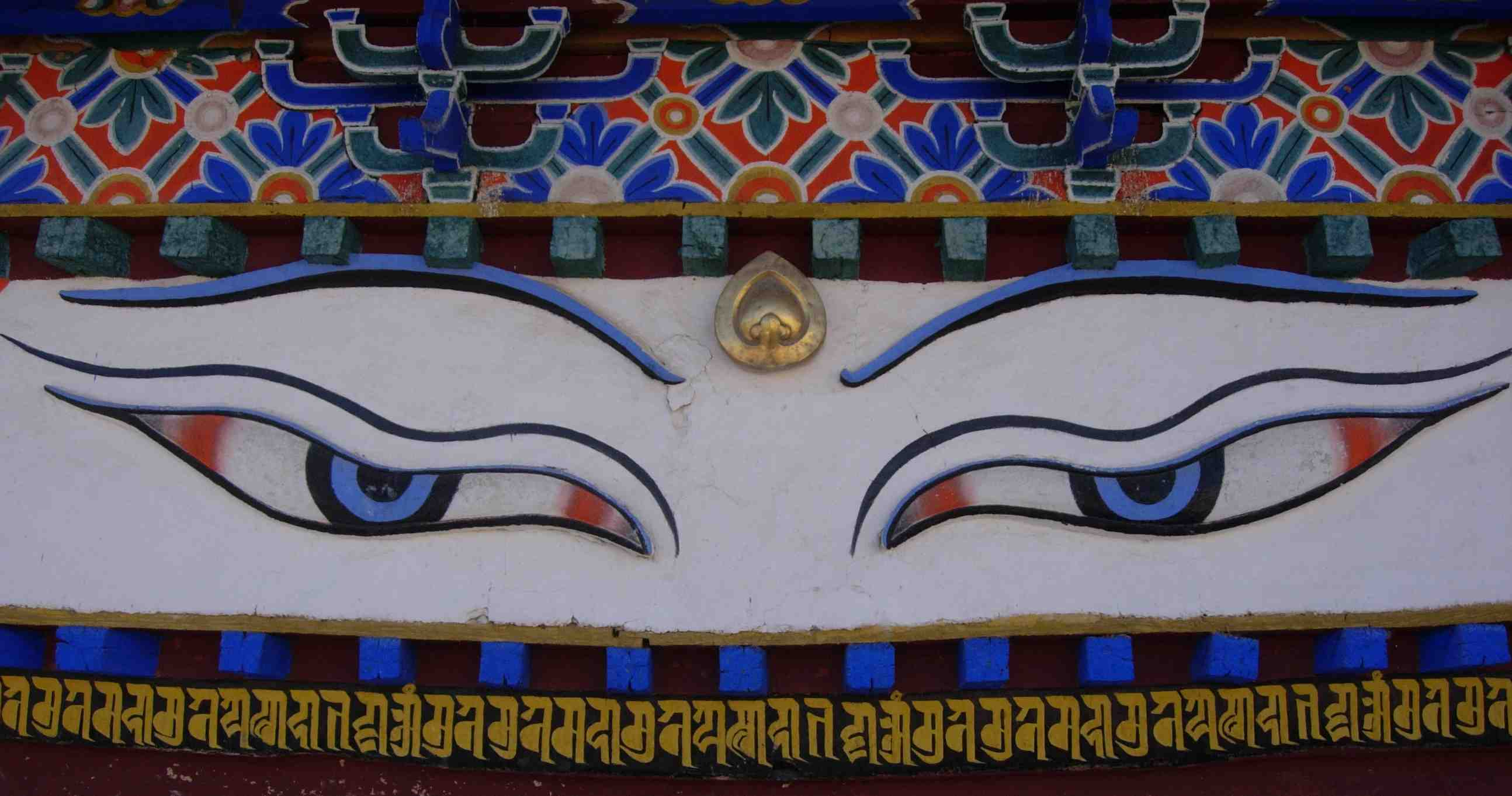
Artwork on the exterior of the Kumbum in Gyantse.

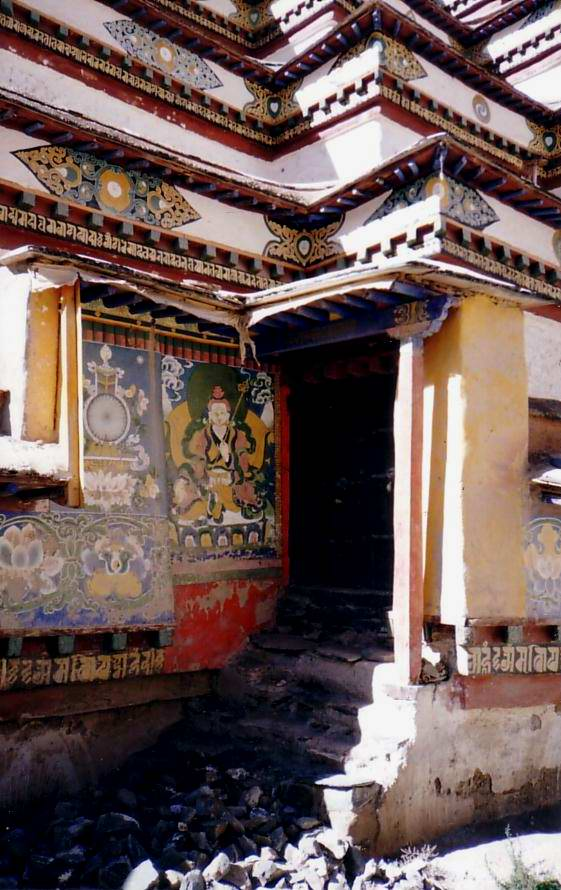
Entrance to Pango Chorten, Gyantse, 1993

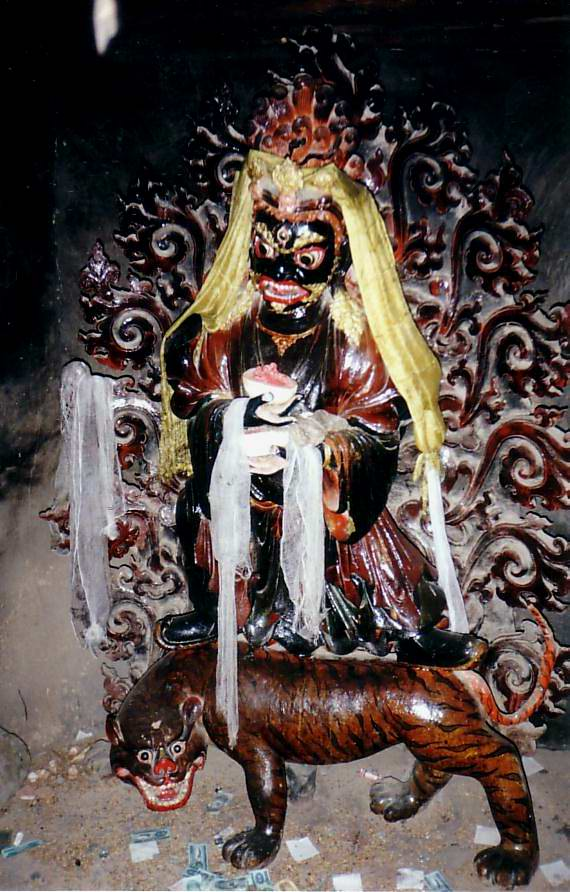
Wrathful Deity, Pango Chorten, Gyantse.

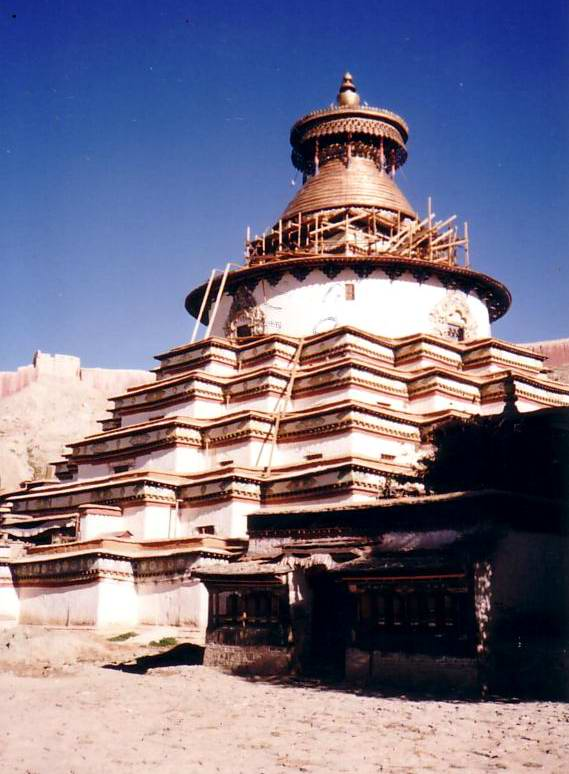
Pango Chorten, Gyantse.

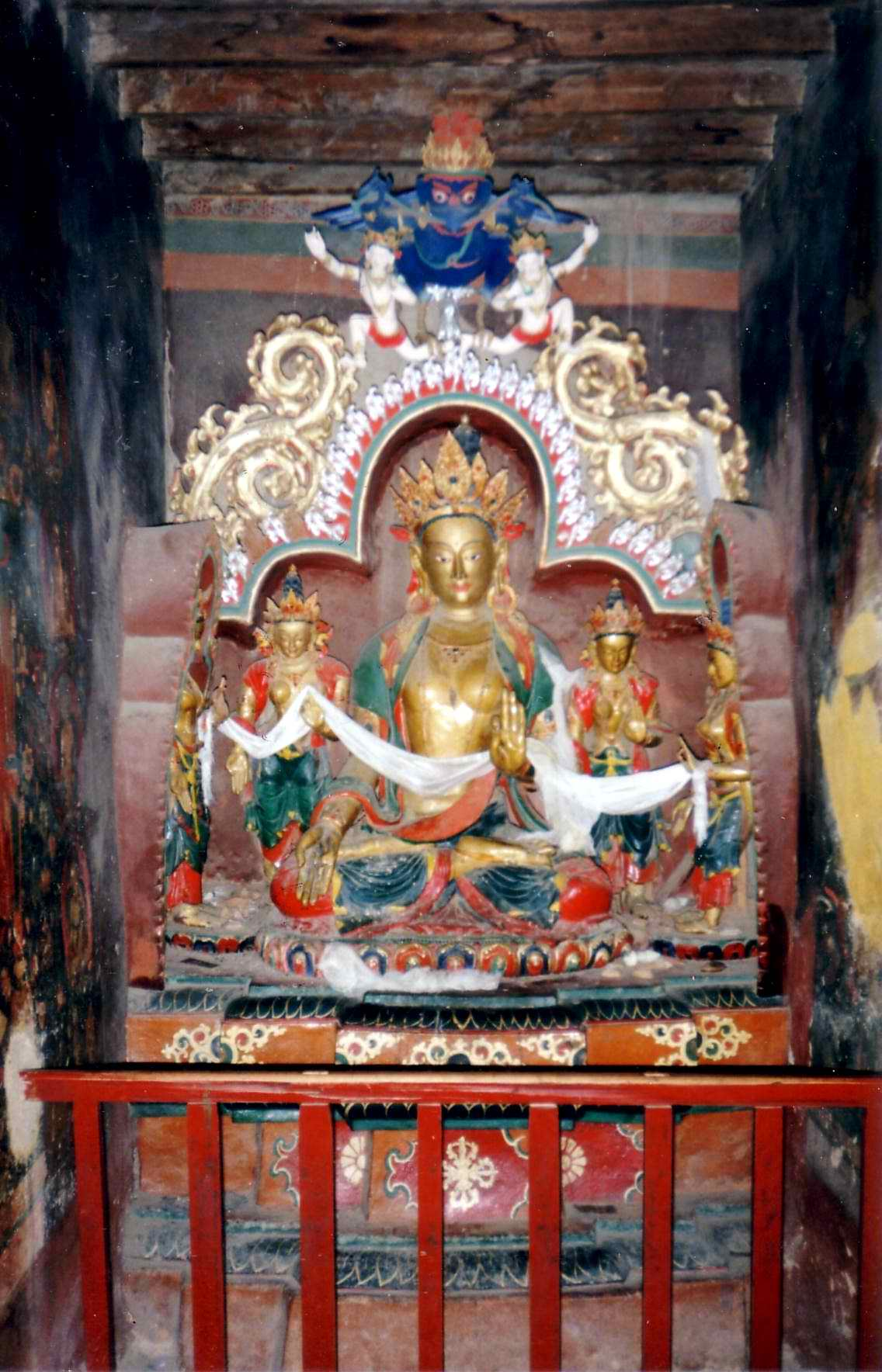
Tara statue. Gyantse Kumbum. 1993

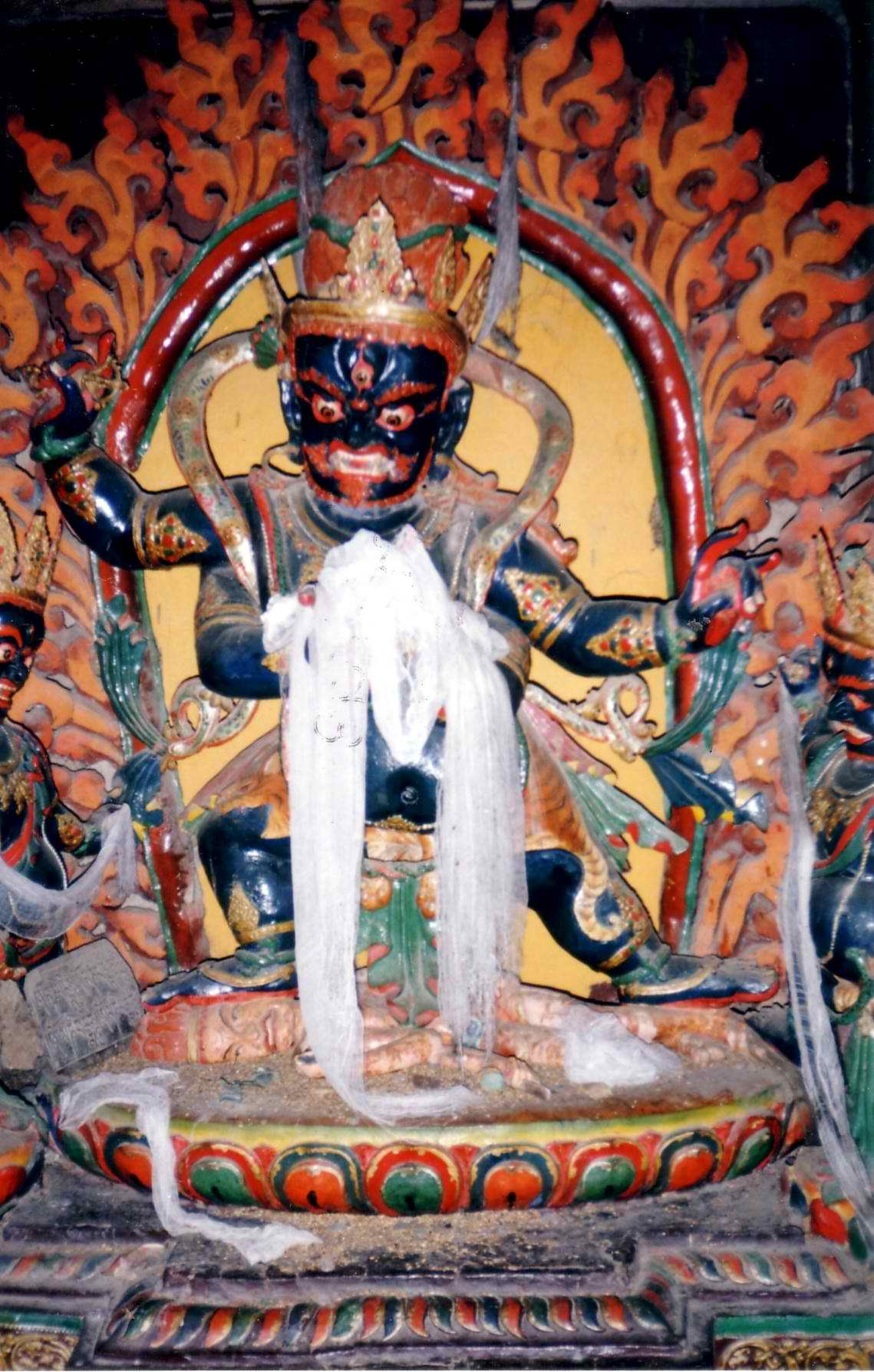
Protective deity, Gyantse Kumbum. 1993

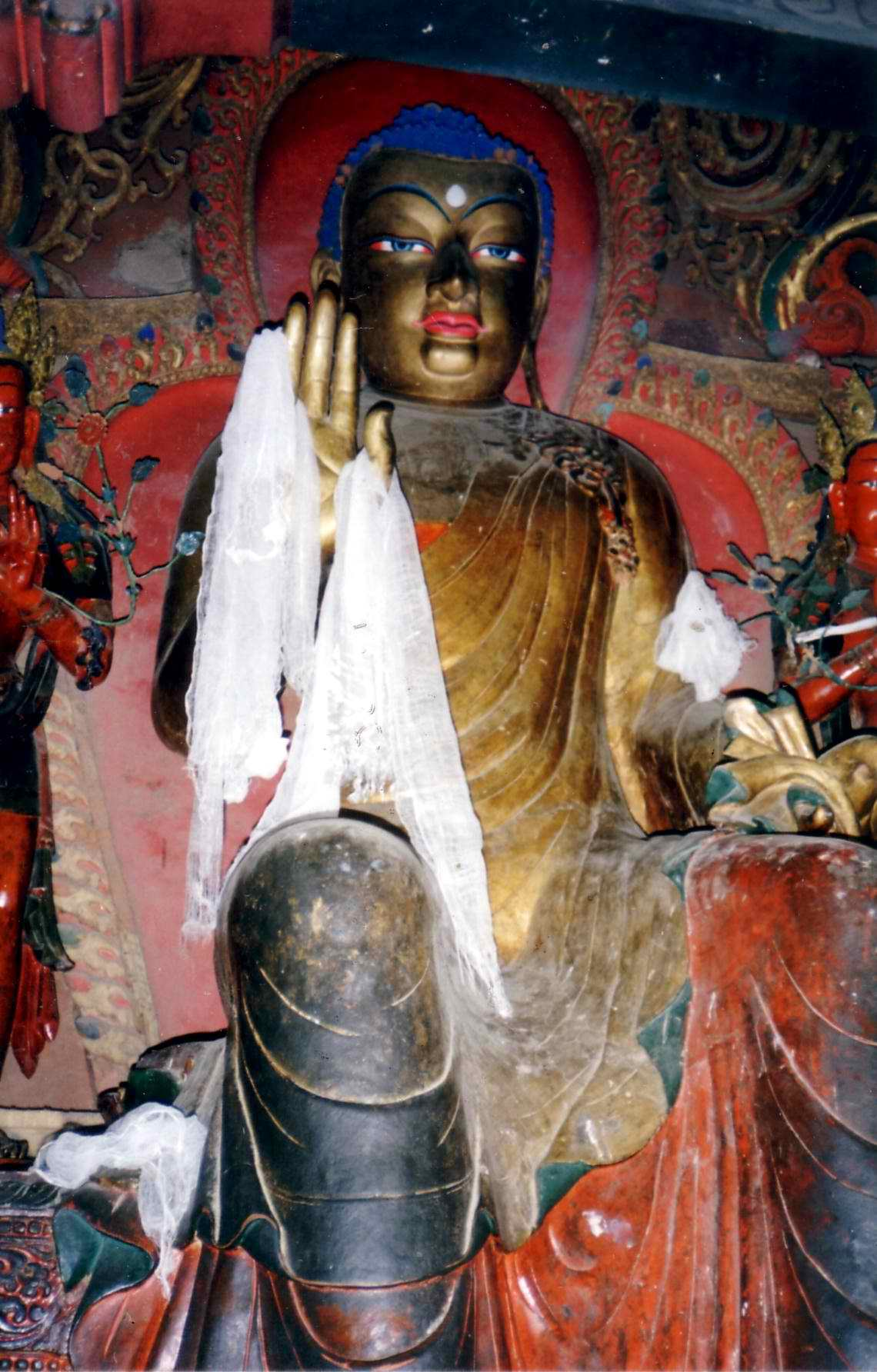
Sitting Buddha, Gyantse Kumbum. 1993

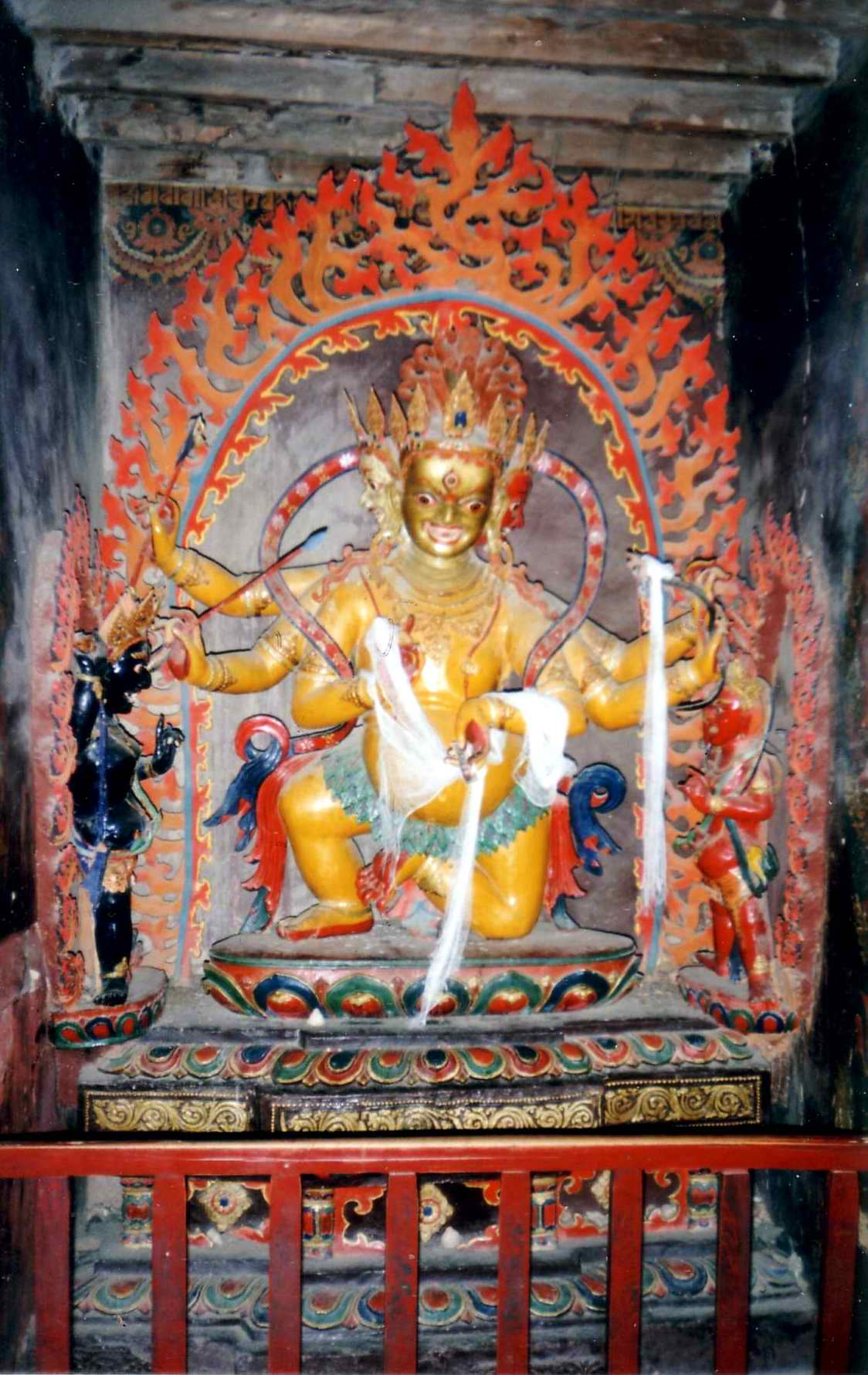
Deity, Gyantse Kumbum. 1993

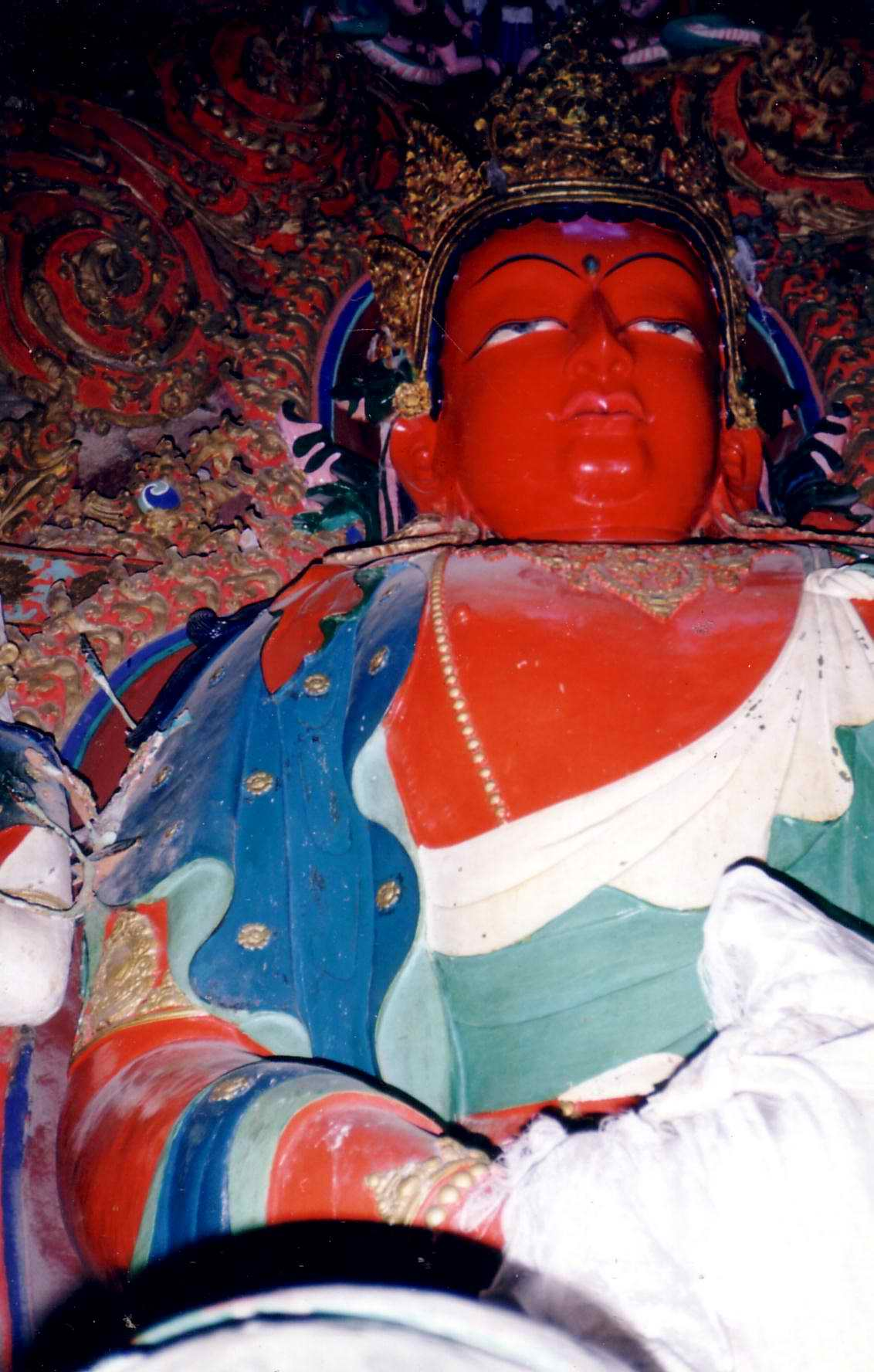
Statue, Gyantse Kumbum. 1993

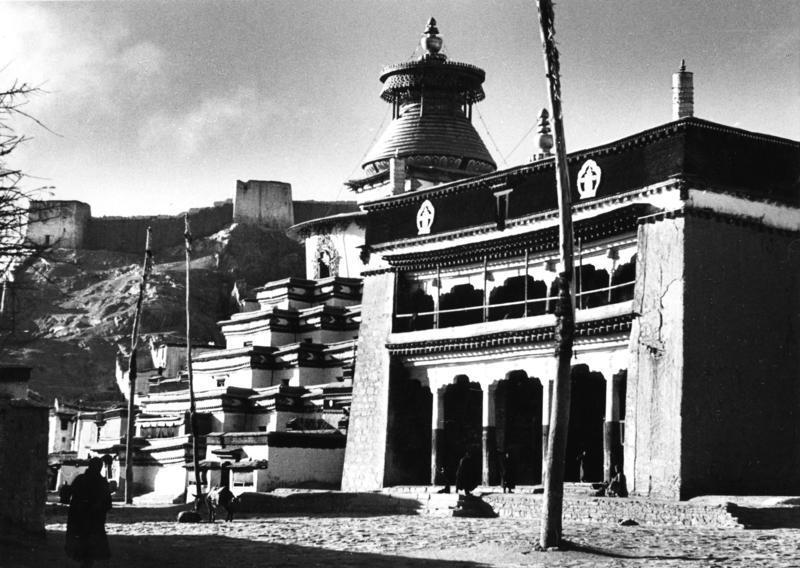
Gyantse Kumbum and gompa, 1938

== Literature ==
- von Schroeder, Ulrich. 2006. Empowered Masters: Tibetan Wall Paintings of Mahasiddhas at Gyantse. (p. 224 pages with 91 colour illustrations). Chicago: Serindia Publications. ISBN 1-932476-24-5
