= Gyantse =

Gyantse རྒྱལ་རྩེ · 江孜镇
- Gyangzê
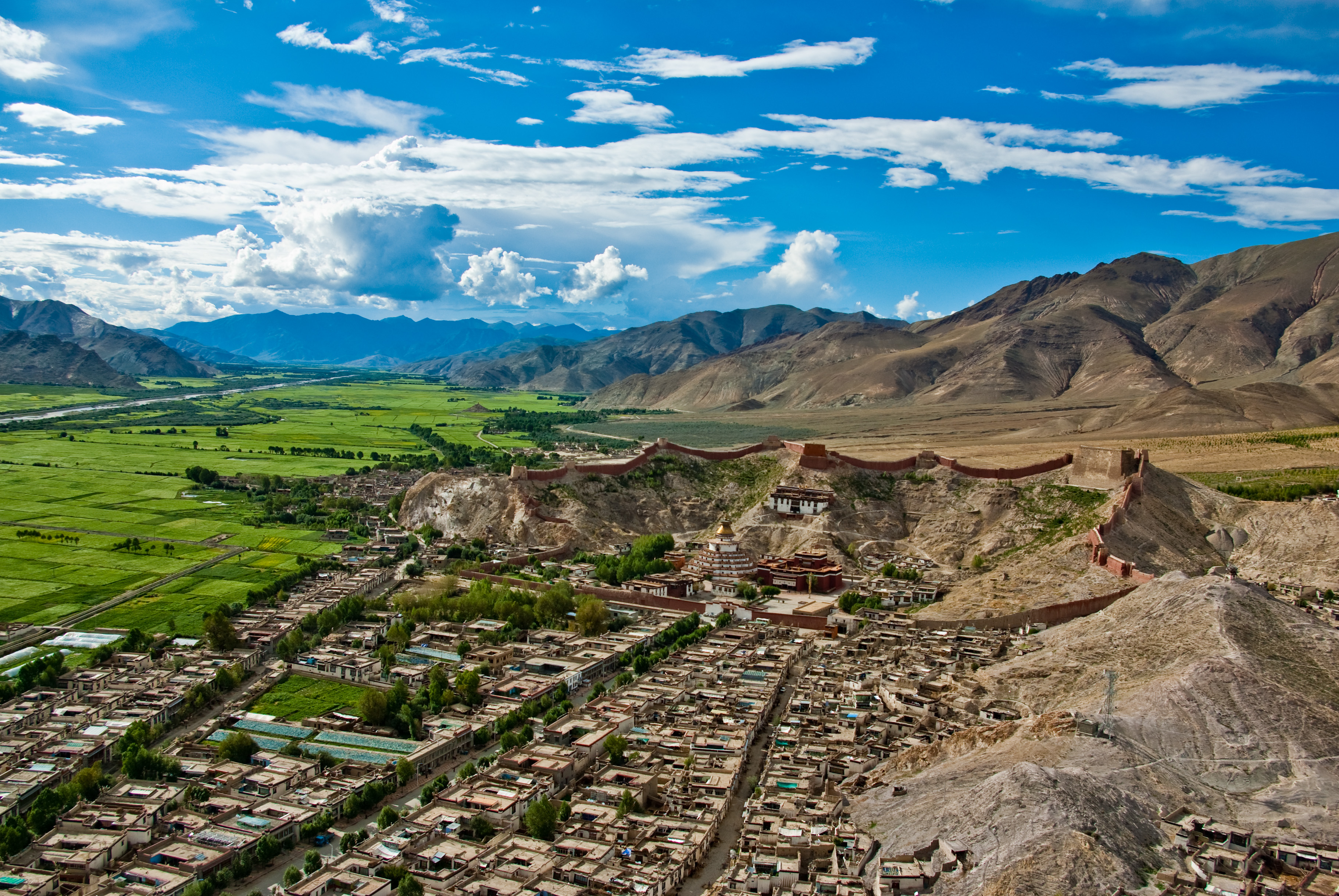
- View of Old Gyantse and Palcho Monastery from Gyantse Dzong

- Location in the Tibet Autonomous Region
- Coordinates (Gyantse town government): 28°54′53″N 89°36′16″E
- Country: People's Republic of China
- Province: Tibet Autonomous Region
- Prefecture-level city: Shigatse
- County: Gyantse

Population (2010)
  - Total: 11,039
- Time zone: UTC+8 (CST)

Gyantse, officially Gyangzê Town (also spelled Gyangtse; Tibetan: རྒྱལ་རྩེ, Wylie: rgyal rtse, ZWPY: Gyangzê; simplified Chinese: 江孜镇; traditional Chinese: 江孜鎮; pinyin: Jiāngzī Zhèn), is a town located in Gyantse County, Shigatse Prefecture, Tibet Autonomous Region, China. It was historically considered the third largest and most prominent town in Tibet (after Lhasa and Shigatse), but there are now at least ten larger Tibetan cities.

== History ==
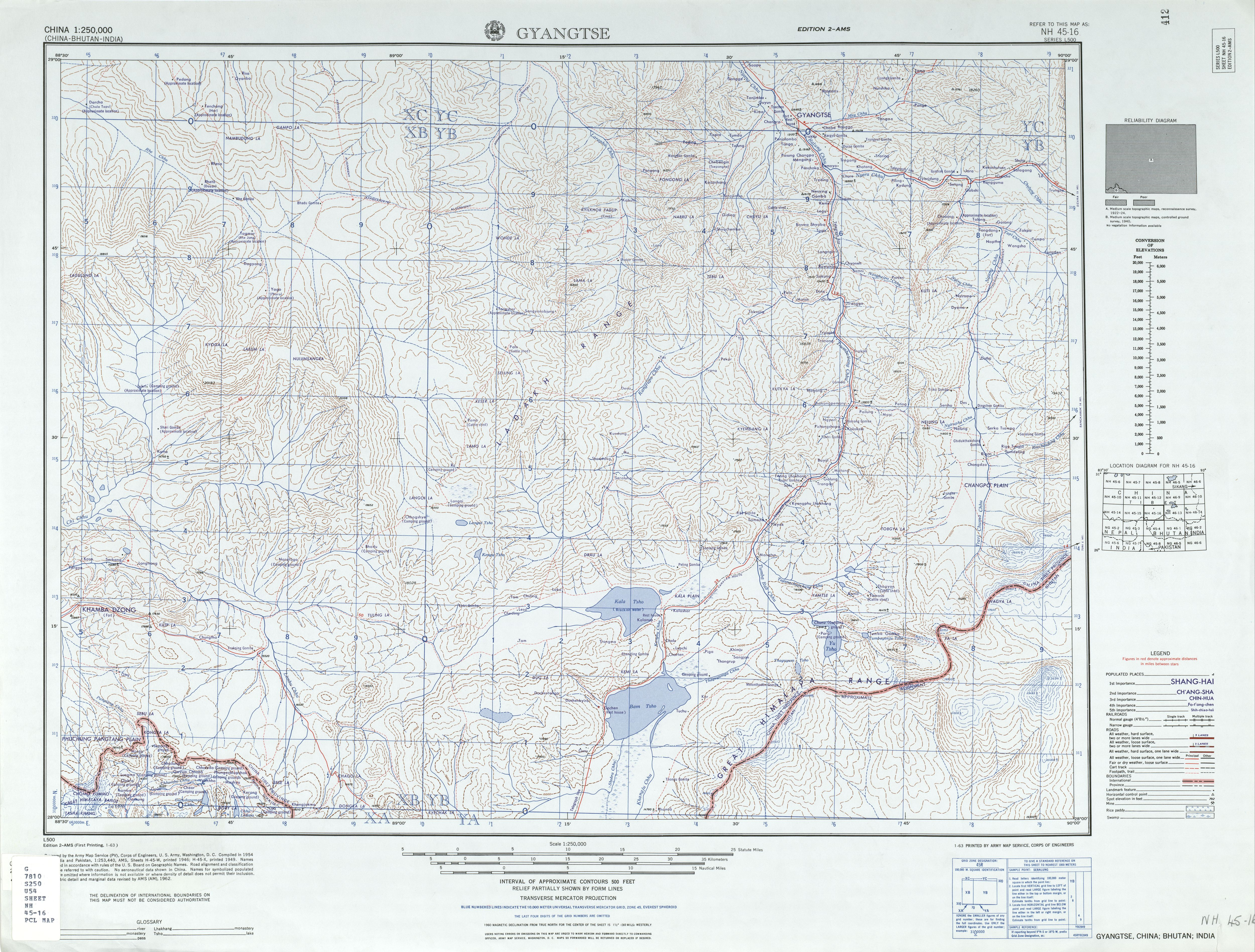
A 1954 map of Gyantse

In 1904, the British expedition to Tibet reached Gyantse on 11 April. The town's garrison had already fled, and the expedition's members entered the town bloodlessly through the front gates, which were opened for them, and occupied Gyantse. After the town was occupied, several British officers visited the Palcho Monastery and seized several statues and scrolls. During the occupation, the town's inhabitants continued to go about their business, and the expedition's medical officer, Herbert James Walton, attended to their medical needs, including performing several operations to correct the common problem of cleft palates. The expedition's officers spent time exploring the town and carrying out fishing or hunting trips in the surrounding countryside. Eventually, the expedition concluded a treaty with the Tibetan authorities, which stipulated that a British trade agent and garrison would be stationed at Gyantse.

In 1919, Sir Walter Buchanan, a member of the Royal Geographical Society, travelled into the Chumbi Valley and visited the British garrison at Gyantse, describing it as "small" and noting that it consisted primarily of Indian troops. During the reign of the 13th Dalai Lama, a military academy was established by the British in Gyantse to train Tibetan Army officers. During World War II, the British continued to maintain a garrison in Gyantse, though it was eventually disbanded by 1947.

== Location ==
The town is strategically located in the Nyang Chu valley on the ancient trade routes from the Chumbi Valley, Yatung and Sikkim, which met here. From Gyantse, routes led to Shigatse downstream and also over the Kora La (Pass) to Central Tibet. The fortress (constructed in 1390) guarded the southern approaches to the Yarlung Tsangpo Valley and Lhasa. The town was surrounded by a wall 3 km long.

== Demographics ==
In 1952, Gyantse had a population of perhaps 8,000 people, about the same as in 2008. It is 3,977 meters (13,050 ft) above sea level, and is located 254 km southwest of Lhasa in the fertile plain of the Nyang river valley and on a side branch of the Friendship Highway, which connects Kathmandu, Nepal to Lhasa. Gyantse was the third largest city in Tibet before being overtaken by Qamdo.

== Landmarks ==
Gyantse is notable for its restored Gyantse Dzong or fort, and its magnificent tiered Kumbum (literally: '100,000 images') of the Palcho Monastery, the largest chörten in Tibet. The Kumbum was commissioned by a Gyantse prince in 1427 and was an important centre of the Sakya school of Tibetan Buddhism. This religious structure contains 77 chapels in its six floors, and is illustrated with over 10,000 murals, many showing a strong Nepali influence, which have survived almost entirely intact. They are the last of its kind to be found in Tibet. Many of the restored clay statues are of less artistry than the destroyed originals - but they are still spectacular.

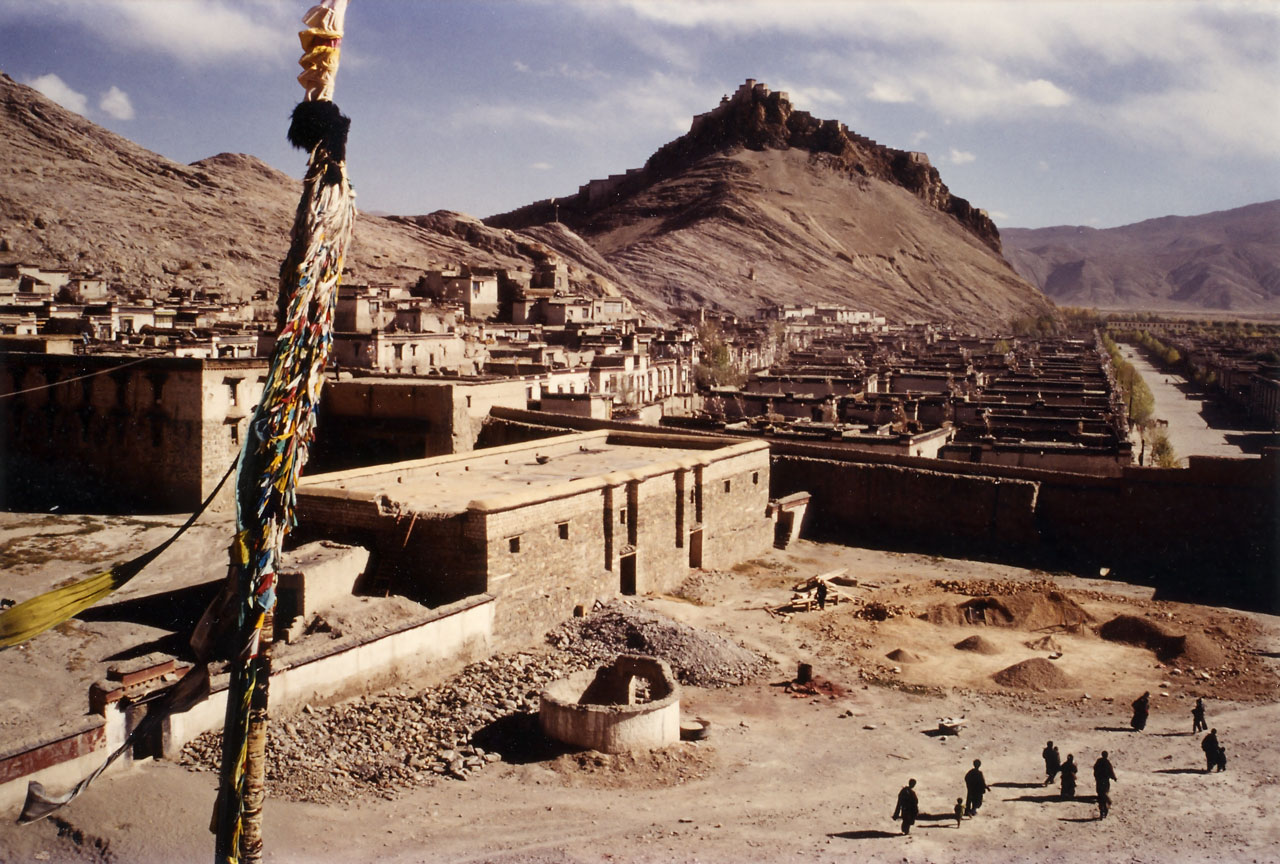
Gyantse with the Dzong fortress in the background. 1995.

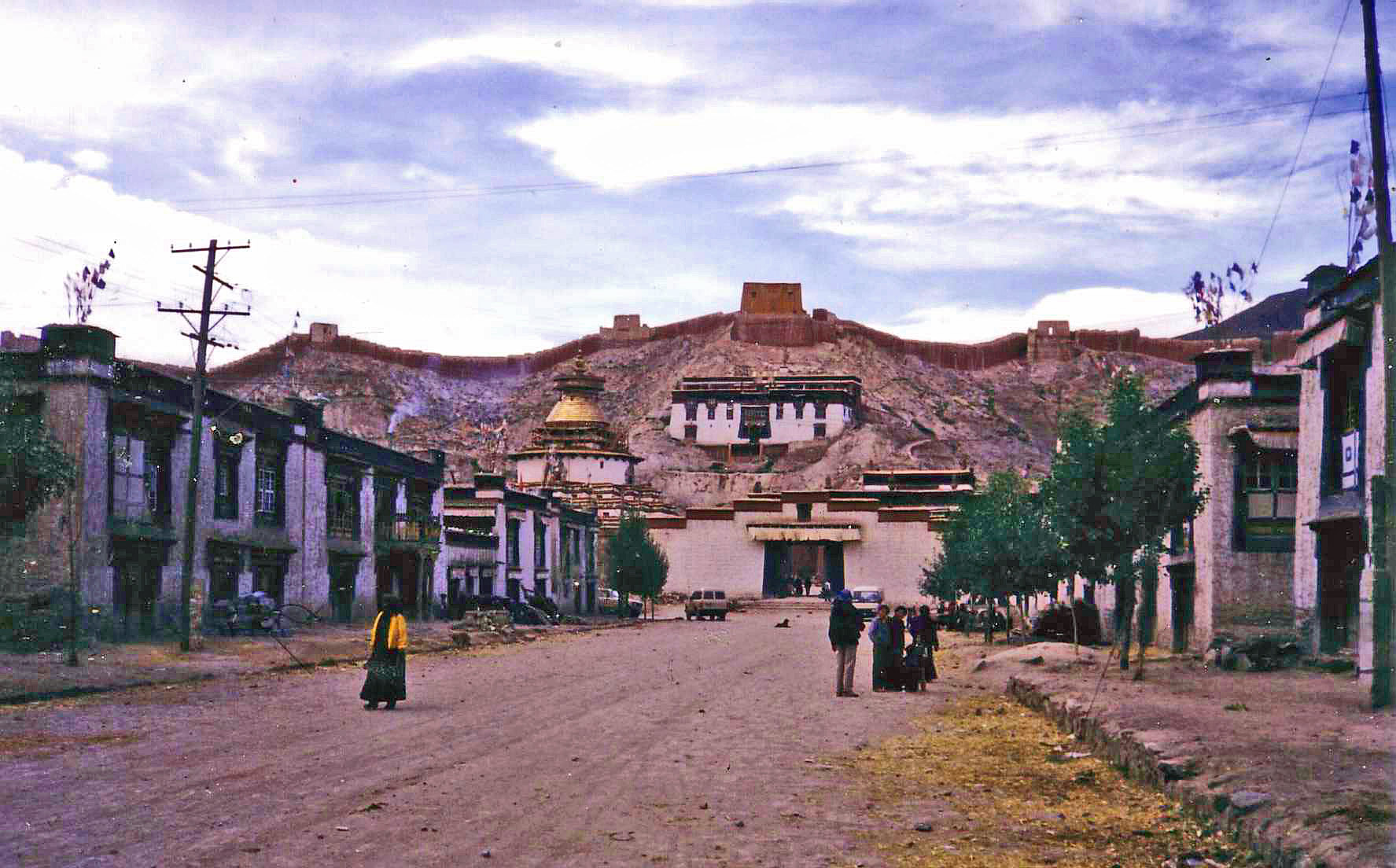
Main street Gyantse, with Kumbum on left and fort above. 1993

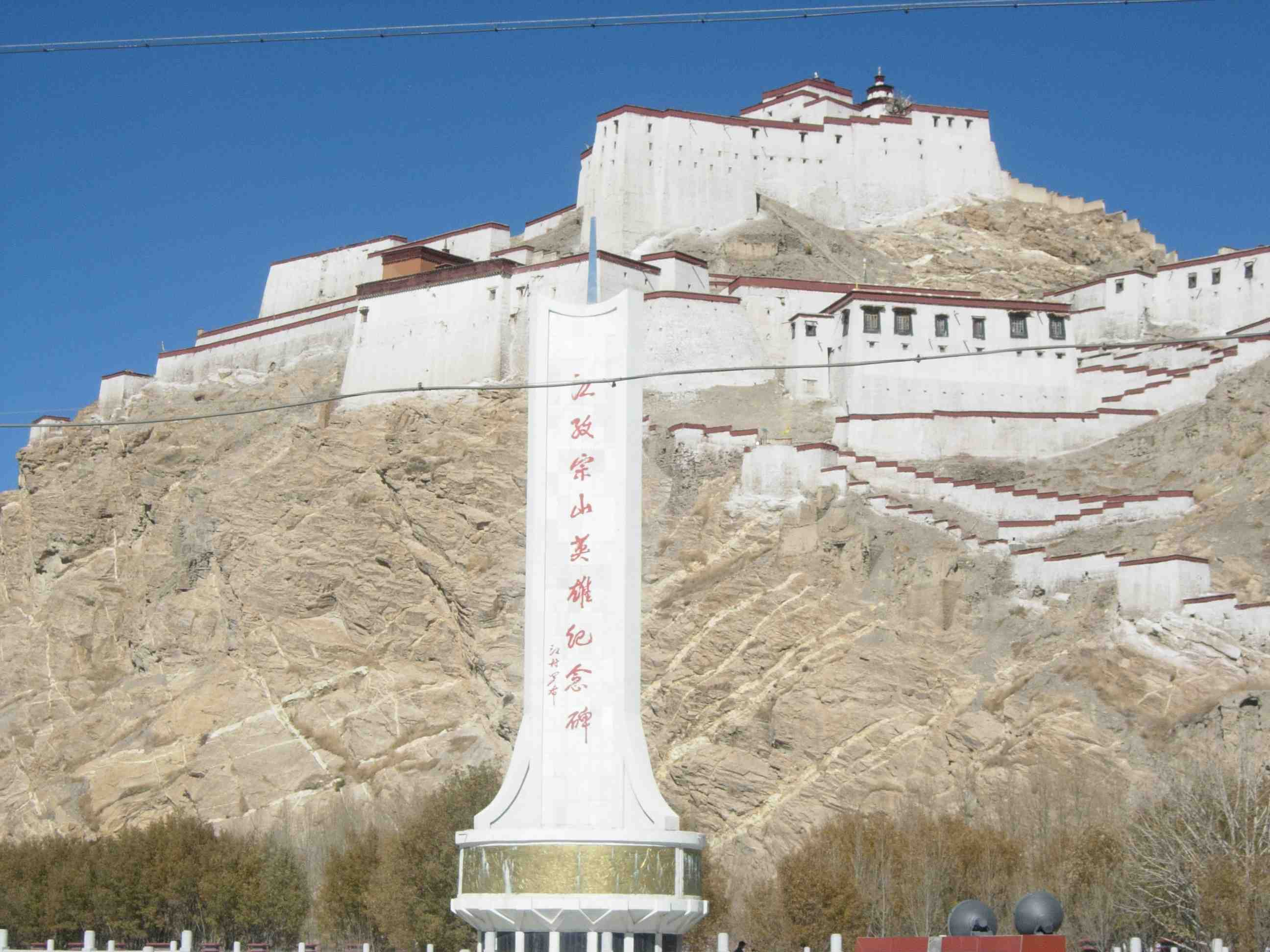
Gyantse Fortress

The town was nearly destroyed by flooding in 1954. After rioting in 1959, local industries were dismantled and artisans fled while others were placed in workcamps. Some 400 monks and laypeople were imprisoned in the monastery. During the Cultural Revolution, the fort, the monastery and Kumbum were ransacked. Precious objects were destroyed or sent out of Tibet. The chorten was spared.

The main building of the Pelkor Chode or Palcho Monastery and the Kumbum have been largely restored but the dzong or fort is still largely in ruins. During the 20th century, the Chinese government established the "Anti-British Imperialism Museum" in Gyantse, which exhibits the state narrative on the 1904 British expedition. The sculpture that forms the centerpiece of the museum are two "Tibetan" warriors, but they were based on photos taken by Lt. G. J. Davys in Chumbi Valley of non-Tibetans doing fake battles, and the armor were worn backwards.

== Climate ==
Gyantse has an elevation-influenced humid continental climate (Köppen climate classification: Dwb).

Climate data for Gyantse, elevation 4,040 m (13,250 ft), (1991–2020 normals, extremes 1981–2010)
Month	Jan	Feb	Mar	Apr	May	Jun	Jul	Aug	Sep	Oct	Nov	Dec	Year
Record high °C (°F)	17.0 (62.6)	17.3 (63.1)	22.1 (71.8)	23.2 (73.8)	25.9 (78.6)	28.7 (83.7)	28.2 (82.8)	25.4 (77.7)	24.6 (76.3)	21.9 (71.4)	18.9 (66.0)	16.1 (61.0)	28.7 (83.7)
Mean daily maximum °C (°F)	5.9 (42.6)	7.6 (45.7)	10.7 (51.3)	13.9 (57.0)	17.7 (63.9)	21.1 (70.0)	20.5 (68.9)	19.7 (67.5)	18.9 (66.0)	15.4 (59.7)	10.6 (51.1)	7.3 (45.1)	14.1 (57.4)
Daily mean °C (°F)	−3.8 (25.2)	−1.1 (30.0)	2.6 (36.7)	5.7 (42.3)	9.6 (49.3)	13.2 (55.8)	13.0 (55.4)	12.1 (53.8)	10.8 (51.4)	6.6 (43.9)	0.8 (33.4)	−2.9 (26.8)	5.6 (42.0)
Mean daily minimum °C (°F)	−13.1 (8.4)	−10.1 (13.8)	−5.8 (21.6)	−1.9 (28.6)	2.1 (35.8)	6.1 (43.0)	7.4 (45.3)	6.6 (43.9)	4.2 (39.6)	−1.1 (30.0)	−7.6 (18.3)	−11.4 (11.5)	−2.0 (28.3)
Record low °C (°F)	−23.9 (−11.0)	−20.4 (−4.7)	−16.2 (2.8)	−12.6 (9.3)	−7.6 (18.3)	−2.3 (27.9)	0.2 (32.4)	−1.0 (30.2)	−3.6 (25.5)	−11.6 (11.1)	−14.0 (6.8)	−21.4 (−6.5)	−23.9 (−11.0)
Average precipitation mm (inches)	0.3 (0.01)	0.5 (0.02)	1.7 (0.07)	7.7 (0.30)	16.9 (0.67)	37.7 (1.48)	89.3 (3.52)	89.2 (3.51)	34.7 (1.37)	3.5 (0.14)	0.5 (0.02)	1.8 (0.07)	283.8 (11.18)
Average precipitation days (≥ 0.1 mm)	0.4	0.7	1.2	4.0	6.6	10.9	18.8	18.5	10.7	2.1	0.4	0.3	74.6
Average snowy days	0.8	1.1	2.2	5.9	3.2	0.2	0.1	0	0.3	1.4	0.7	0.5	16.4
Average relative humidity (%)	30	30	33	40	46	54	67	70	62	45	38	38	46
Mean monthly sunshine hours	272.2	251.5	276.2	273.1	295.9	273.4	224.6	224.6	244.3	294.0	283.6	280.9	3,194.3
Percentage possible sunshine	83	79	74	70	70	66	53	56	67	84	89	88	73
Source: China Meteorological Administration

== Gallery ==
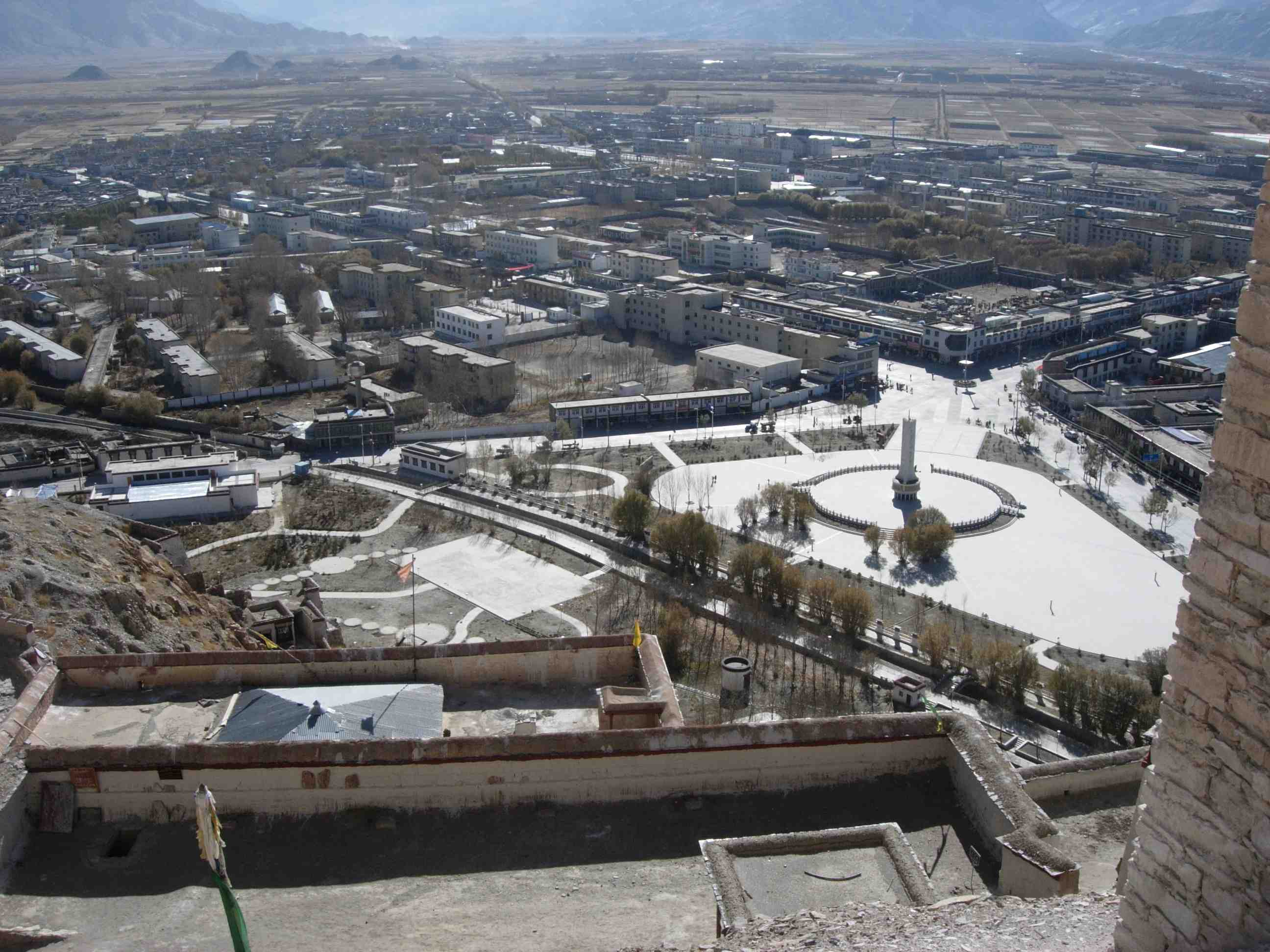
A view of Gyantse from the top of its fortress

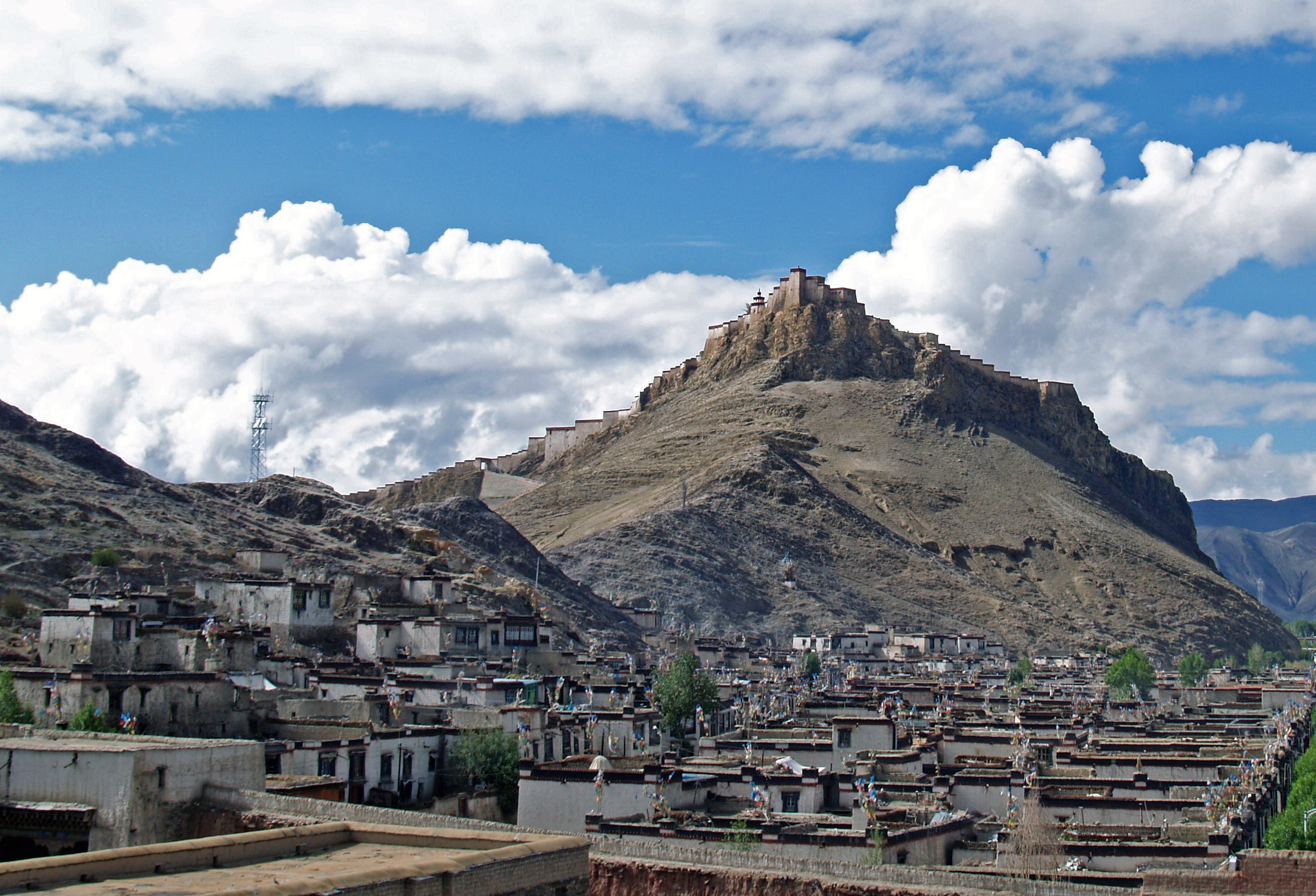
Old Gyantse and the Gyantse Dzong

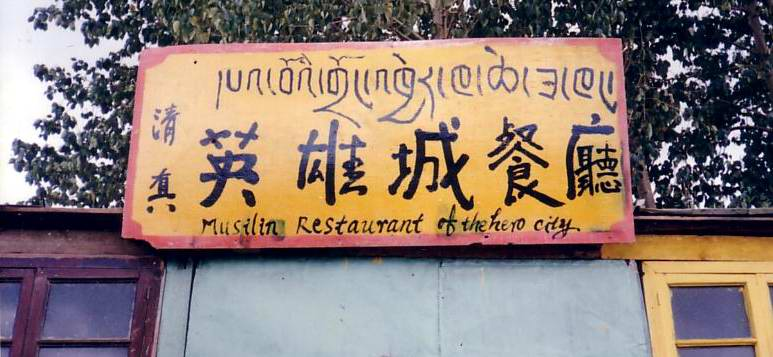
"Musilin Restaurant of the Hero City"

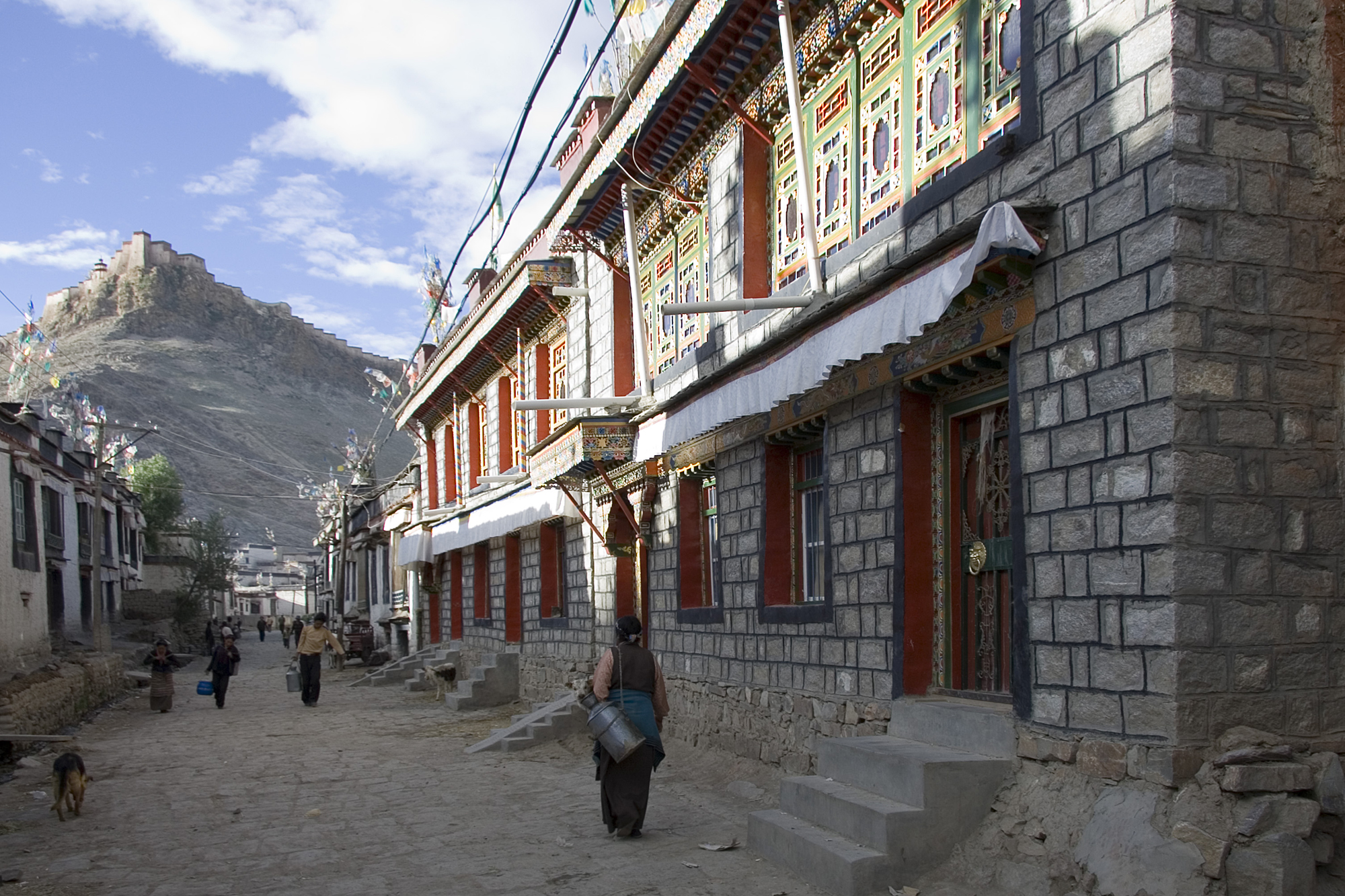
A street in Gyantse old town

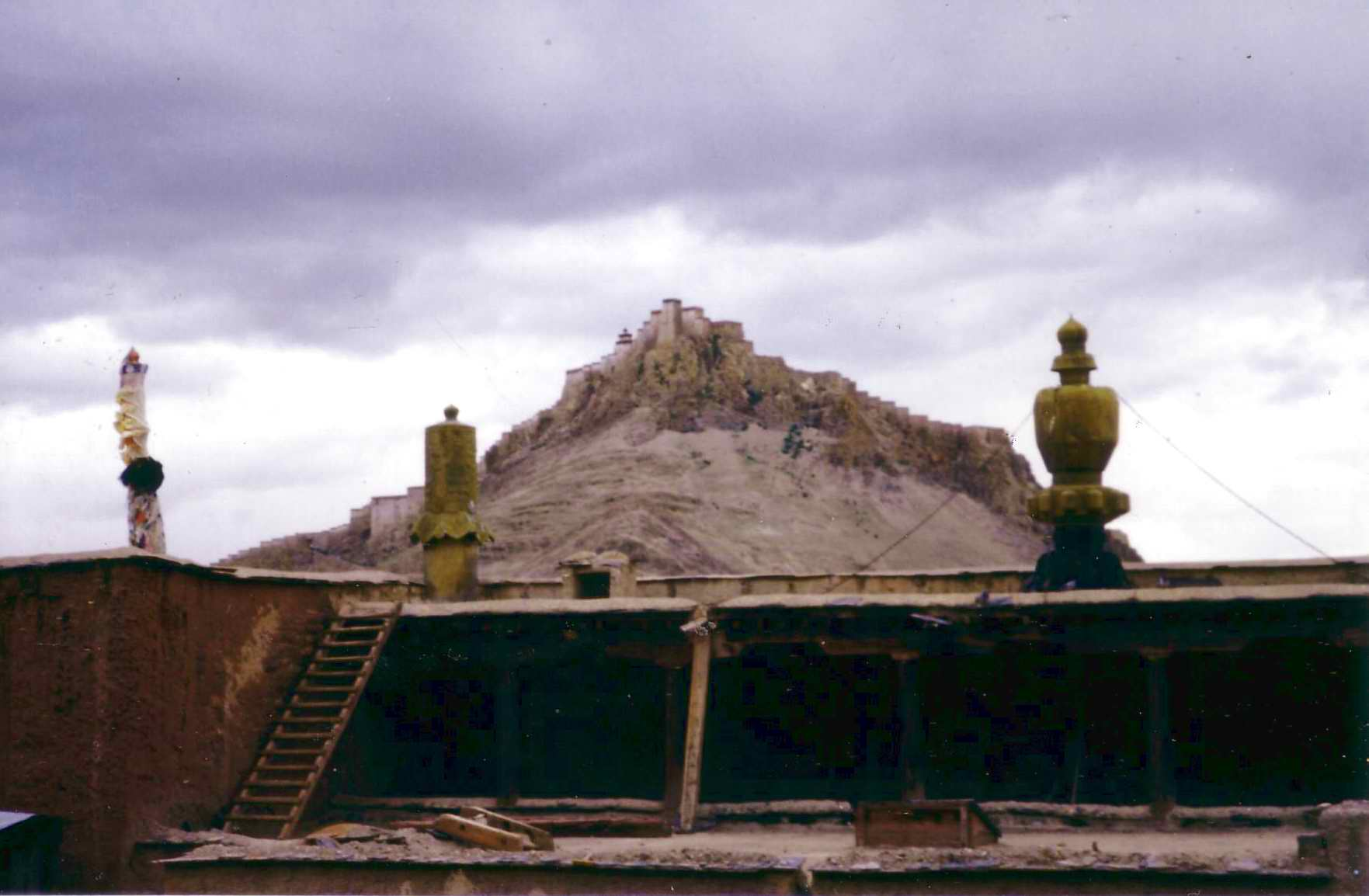
Gyantse fort from Kumbum roof. 1993

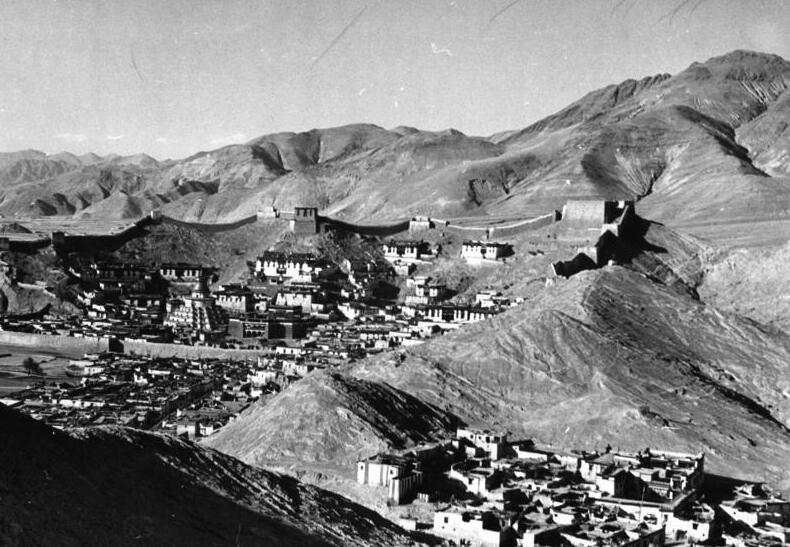
Fortress wall. Gyantse. 1938.

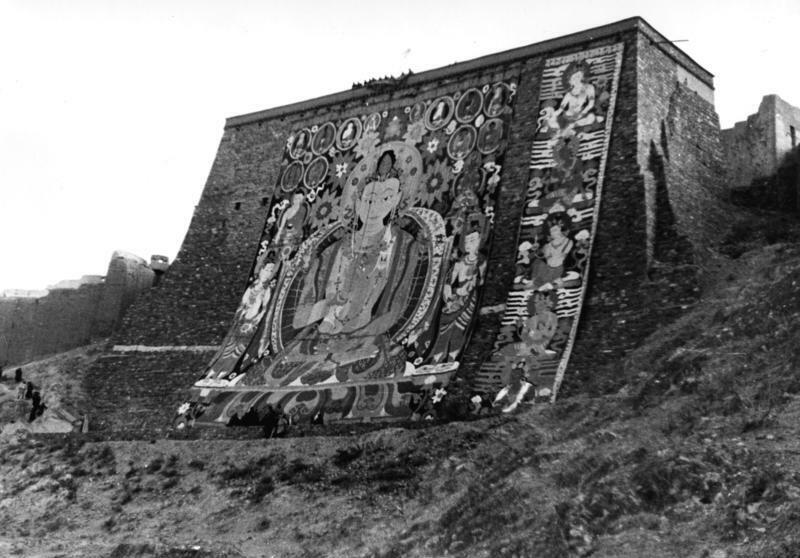
Huge thangka on thangka wall.

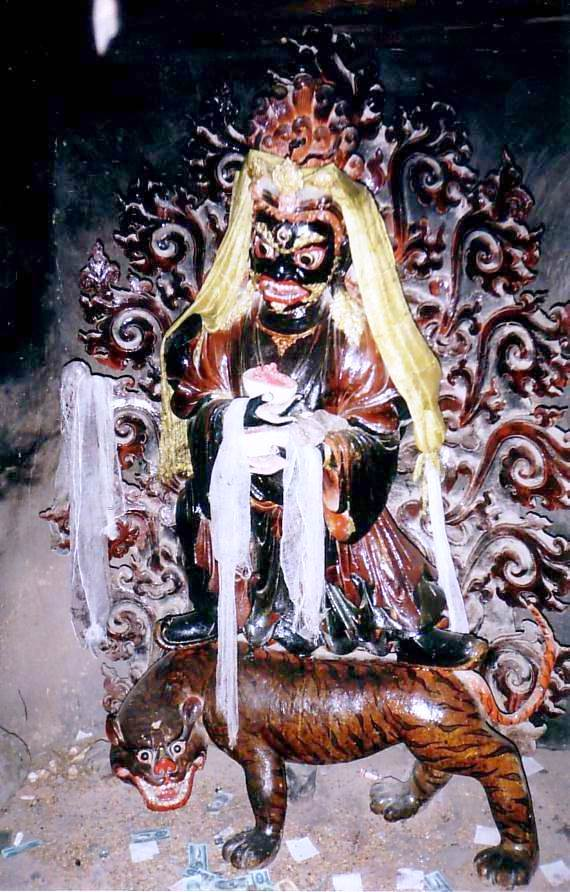
Palden Lhamo, Gyantse Gompa. 1993
