= Great Stupa of Universal Compassion =

Buddhist monument under construction near Bendigo, Victoria, Australia

Coordinates: 36.7201°S 144.1869°E

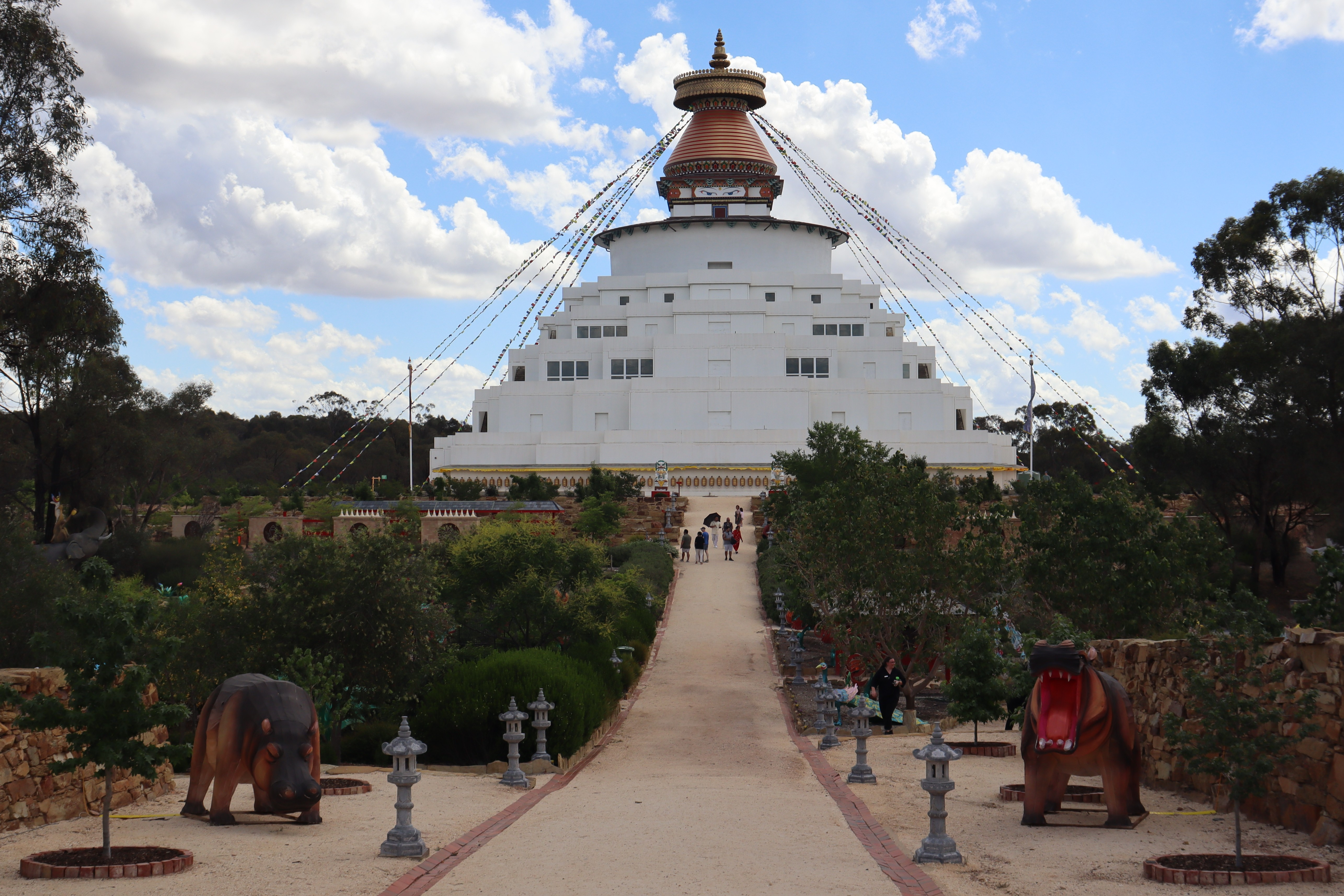

Religion
- Affiliation: Buddhism
- Status: Open to the public

Location
- Location: 25 Sandhurst Town Road, Myers Flat, Victoria, Australia
- Interactive map of Great Stupa of Universal Compassion

Architecture
- Architects: Peter Weiss, Paul von Chrismar
- Type: Stupa
- Construction cost: A$20,000,000 (estimated)
- Height (max): 50 metres (160 ft)

Website
- stupa.org.au

The Great Stupa of Universal Compassion is a Buddhist monument near Bendigo in central Victoria, Australia. The basic idea for building the stupa came from Lama Yeshe and then, after Lama Yeshe's death, from Lama Zopa Rinpoche, who decided to model the stupa (kumbum) on the Great Stupa of Gyantse which is 600 years old. When completed, the stupa's exterior will be an exact replica of the Great Stupa of Gyantse. It will be 50 metres (160 ft) high and its four sides will each be 50 metres (160 ft) long, making it one of the largest Buddhist monuments in the Western world. Buddhists say that viewing the stupa will help purify the mind.

The stupa has been designed to last 1,000 years. The interior has teaching rooms, a central temple, a library and 80 ornate shrine rooms. It houses the 2.5 metre Jade Buddha for Universal Peace statue, the world’s largest gem-quality jade Buddha statue. There is a vast collection of Asian sacred relics and statues on display at the stupa's exhibition centre.

== See also ==
- Great Compassion Mantra
