= Palcho Monastery =

Tibetan Buddhist monastery in Gyantse, Tibet, China

Palcho Monastery Pelkor Chode Monastery
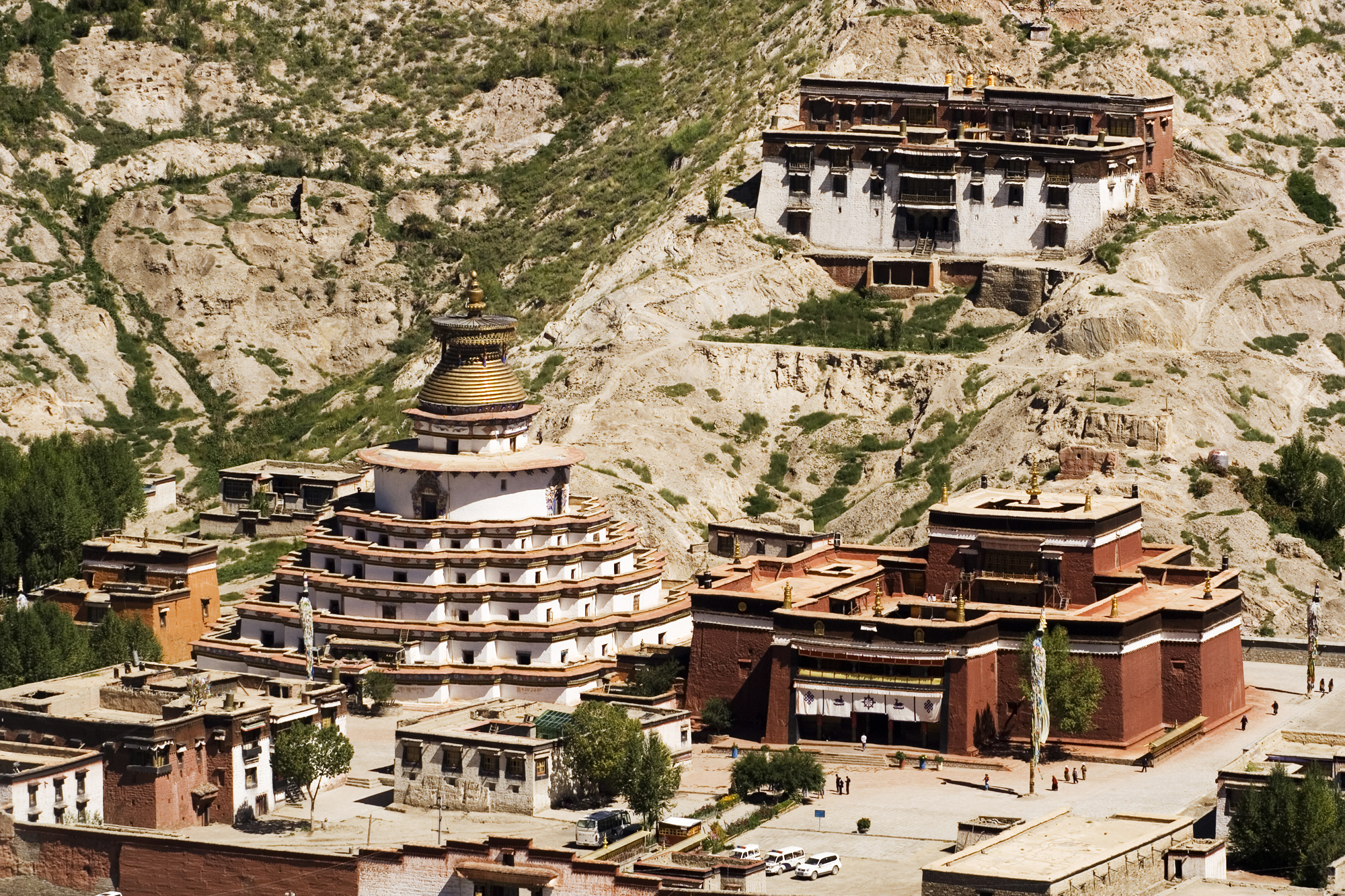
- The Palcho Monastery and Kumbum

- Location within Tibet Autonomous Region

Religion
- Affiliation: Tibetan Buddhism
- Sect: Sakyapa, Kadampa and Gelugpa
- Festival: Gyantse festival

Location
- Location: Gyantse County, Shigatse Prefecture, Tibet Autonomous Region
- Country: People's Republic of China
- Interactive map of Palcho Monastery; Pelkor Chode Monastery
- Coordinates: 28°57′0″N 89°38′0″E

Architecture
- Style: Han, Nepali and Tibetan Architecture
- Founder: Rabten Kunzang Phak
- Established: 1418–1428; 598 years ago

The Palcho Monastery or Pelkor Chode Monastery or Shekar Gyantse is the main monastery in the Nyangchu river valley in Gyantse, Gyantse County, Shigatse Prefecture, Tibet Autonomous Region. The monastery precinct is a complex of structures that, apart from the Tsuklakhang Monastery, also includes its Kumbum, believed to be the largest such structure in Tibet, that is most notable for its 108 chapels in its several floors and the old Dzong or fort.

== History ==
The earliest history of the Penchor Chode Monastery is traced to the ninth century. Pelkhor-tsen, son of Langdarma (anti Buddhist King of West Tibet) after whom the monastery is named as Pelkor Chode, lived here and attempted to perpetuate the Yarlung dynasty of his father who had been assassinated. The town of Gyantse was established between the 14th and 15th centuries as a feudatory, with the Sakya sect playing a crucial overlord role. During this period, the Buddhist monuments were also built with the Dzong (the old fort) followed by the Kumbum and the Pekor monastery. All three structures have been dated. Tsuklakhang monastery was built by prince Rabten Kunzang Phak between 1418 and 1425. However, Gyantse's historical importance declined by the end of the 15th century.

The Tsuklakhang, the main temple of the monastery was built in 1418–1428 by Rabten Kunzang Phak, the second Prince of Gyantse, who was a devotee of Kedrub Je (1385–1438), one of Tsongkapa's leading disciples later recognized as the 1st Panchen Lama. It became an important centre of the Sakya sect of Tibetan Buddhism. The Kumbum or Tashigomang, commenced construction in 1427 and completed by 1437, also by prince Rabten Kunzang Phak. Several other buildings followed, with Buddhist sects such as Sakyapa, Zhalupa and Gelukpa building religious colleges or hermitages; 16 colleges were recorded by the end of 17th century, increasing to 18 by the start of the 19th century. However most of them were later closed. Now, only two colleges of the Gelukpa order remain, which are stated to be of little consequence. Another testament to Prince Rabten Kunzang Phak's period is the public display of two gigantic paintings; (Thangkas) of Shakyamuni Buddha flanked by his two principal disciples, of Maitreya, Manjushri and many more on the occasion of the Gyantse festival that is held in the fourth lunar month of the Tibetan calendar. This practice was started between 1418 and 1419 in the northeast corner of the monastery walls, known as Goku Tramsa.

In 1904, the British expedition to Tibet led by Colonel Francis Younghusband reached Gyantse on 11 April. The town's garrison had already fled, and the expedition's members entered the town bloodlessly through the front gates, which were opened for them, and occupied Gyantse. After the town was occupied, several British officers visited the monastery and seized several statues and scrolls, some of which were subsequently brought back to the United Kingdom. The monastery was partially destroyed by Chinese forces in 1959 after the 1959 Tibetan uprising. It was ransacked again during the Cultural Revolution, but has since been largely restored. Prior to the uprising there were 1,520 monks at the monastery but now they number less than 80.

== Architecture ==
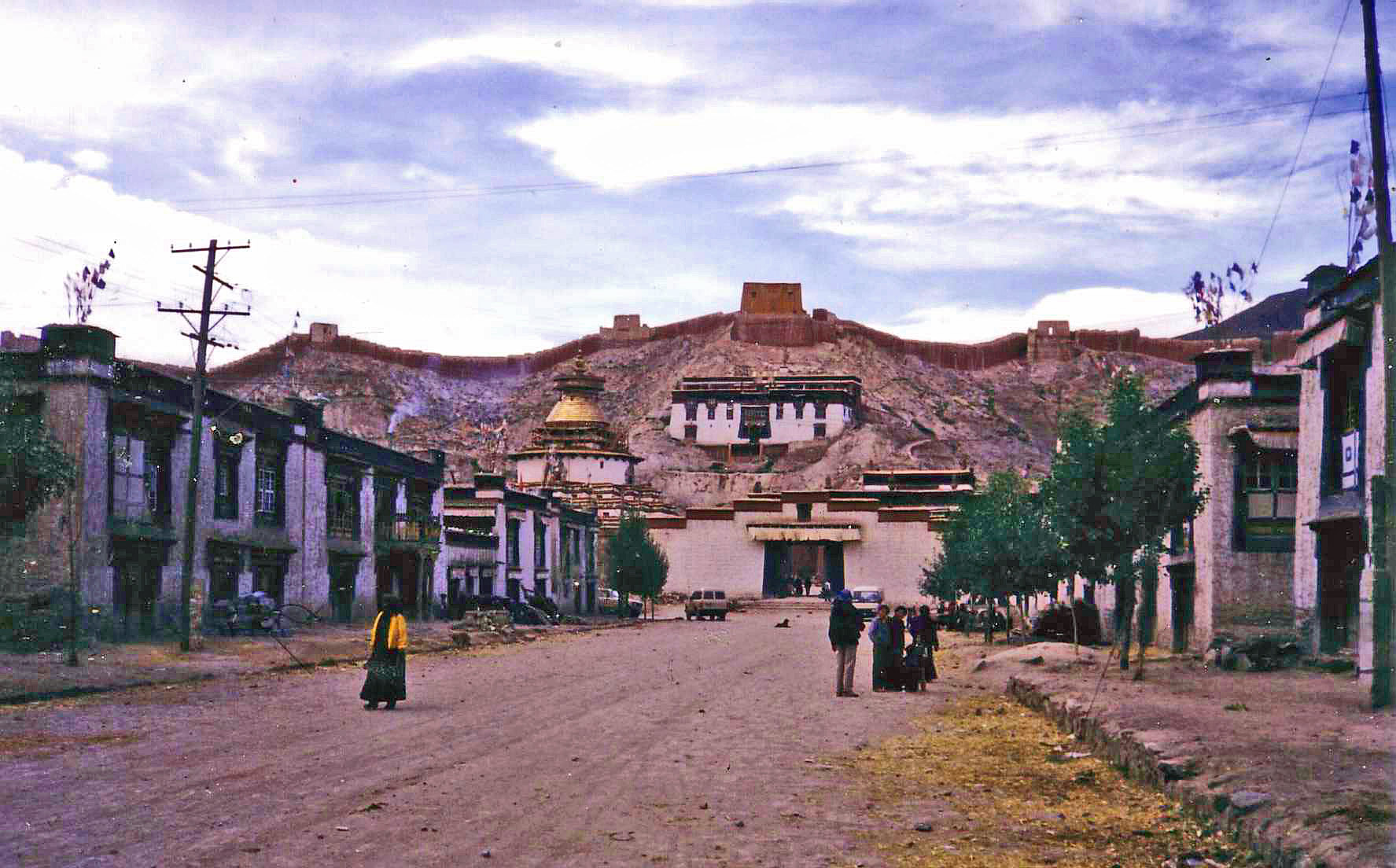
The Kumbum seen on the left and Gyantse Fort straight ahead

Architecturally, Pelkhor monastery is a fusion of Han, Tibetan and Nepali architecture. The most striking architecture in the complex, a symbol of Gyantse, is the Bodhi Dagoba (Tibetan name: Pelkhor Choede), popularly called as the 'Kumbum'. It is a 32 metres (105 ft) high structure, a nine-tier building with 108 gates (108 interpreted as nine-tier structure representing space multiplied by the time element of 12 zodiac signs), and 76 chapels and shrines; out of the nine floors, the first five are square in shape while the rest are circular giving it a pyramidal appearance. It is also given the name "the Ten Thousand Buddha Pagodas", as it has enshrined about ten thousand figures of Buddhas as images and murals. It has hundred chapels overlapping each other, which is called the 'tower upon tower' structure. The chapels have the finest display of Tibetan art in "vibrant colour and naturalistic style"; in the faces of the murals Chinese images are discerned. Three Buddhist sects namely, Sakyapa, Kadampa and Gelugpa are represented here. It is considered the largest of the three Kumbums in Tibet; the other two Kumbams are the Jonang Kumbum and Ching Riwoche.

=== Kumbum ===
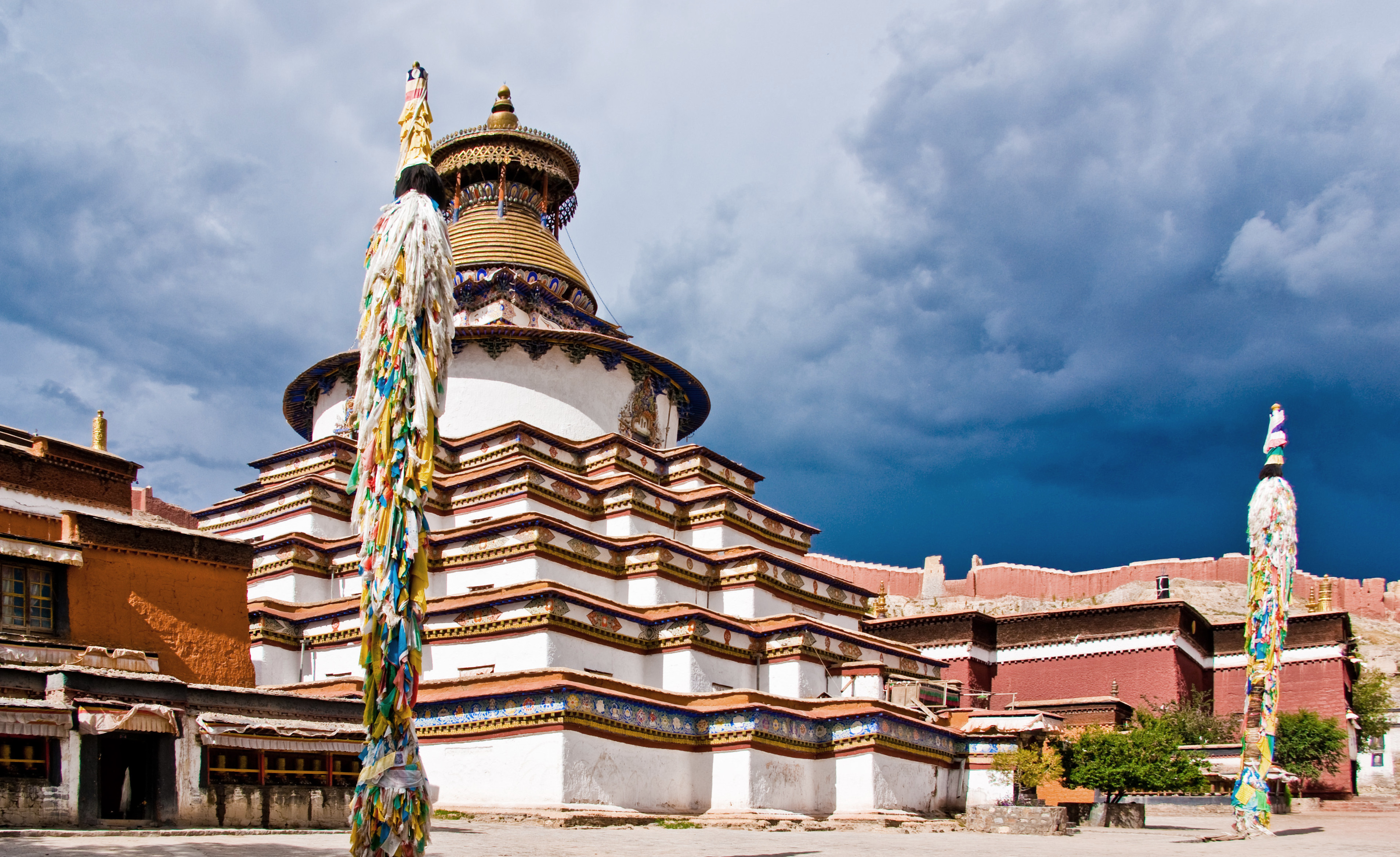
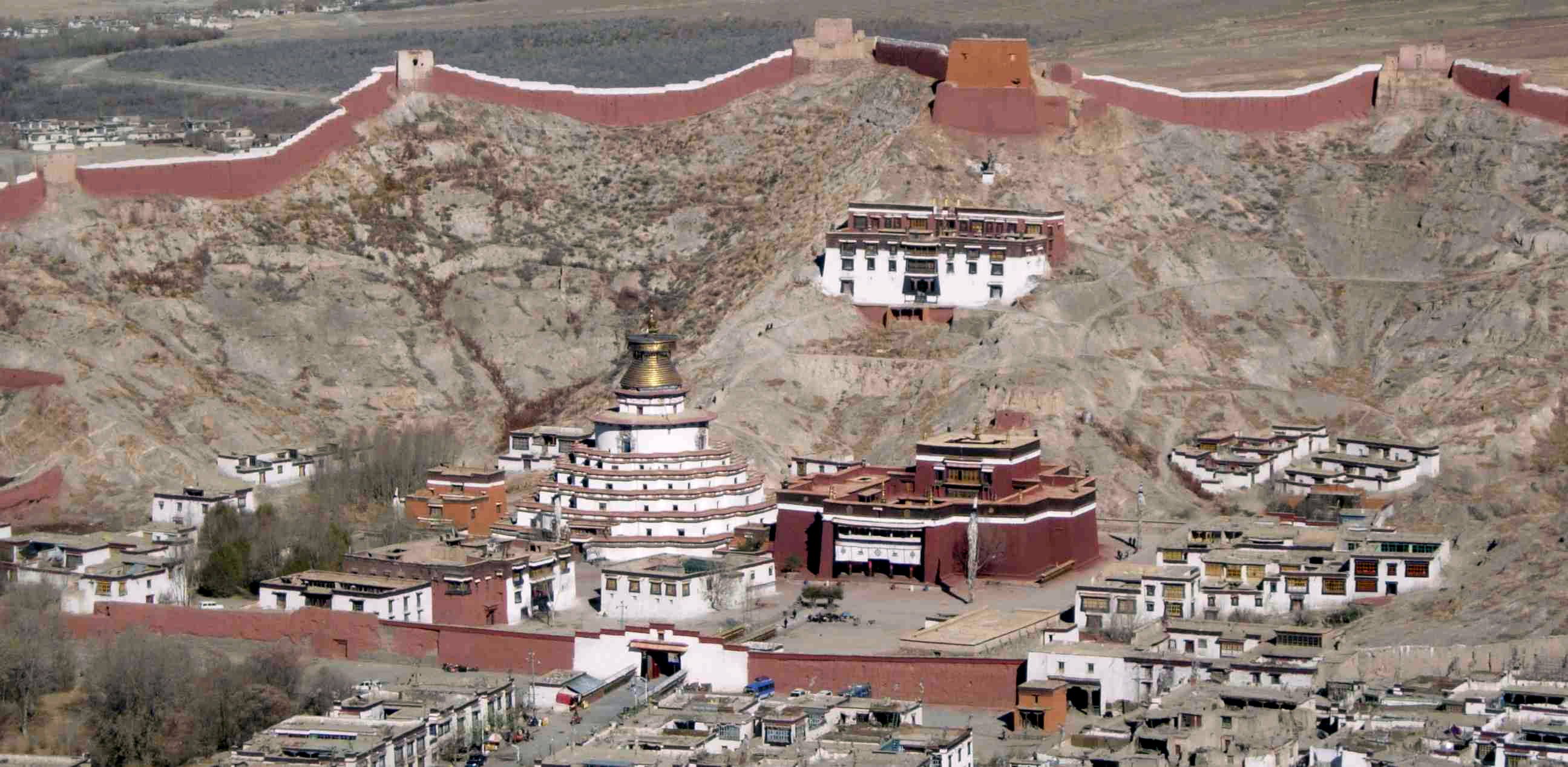
Left: The Gyantse Kumbum-Symbol of Tibet. Right: Palcho Monastery as seen from Gyantse Fortress. The gold-topped, white building is the Kumbum

Kumbum has nine floors or tiers and each tier has unique chapels. The 76 chapels have images that form "a progressive hierarchy of three-dimensional manadalas, as outlined in the Sakyapa compilation known as the Drubtob Gyatsa, ensuring that the stupa encapsulates within it the entire spiritual path and gradation of the tantras".

The first tier of the Kumbum has staircases at the cardinal points which lead to the second tier, with the main entrance being that from the southern side. The second tier has 20 chapels which house images of Kriyatantras in a clockwise order. The third tier has 16 chapels and also depicts images of Kriyatantras along with Caryatantras, arranged in a clockwise order. In the fourth tier, there are twenty chapels depicting images of Yogatantras in a clockwise order. The fifth tier has 12 chapels depicting lineage holders. In the sixth tier there are four chapels, which show Yogatantra deities. The seventh tier has a single chapel with 10 mandalas, a unique depiction of the "Father Class of Unsurpassed Yogatantras". The eighth tier has also a single chapel but depicts 11 mandalas of "Mother Class of Unsurpassed Yogatantras". The last and tenth tier has a single chapel, which has an idol of the Vajradhara Buddha but is "flanked by the masters of the Kalachakra".

=== Tsulaklakang Monastery ===
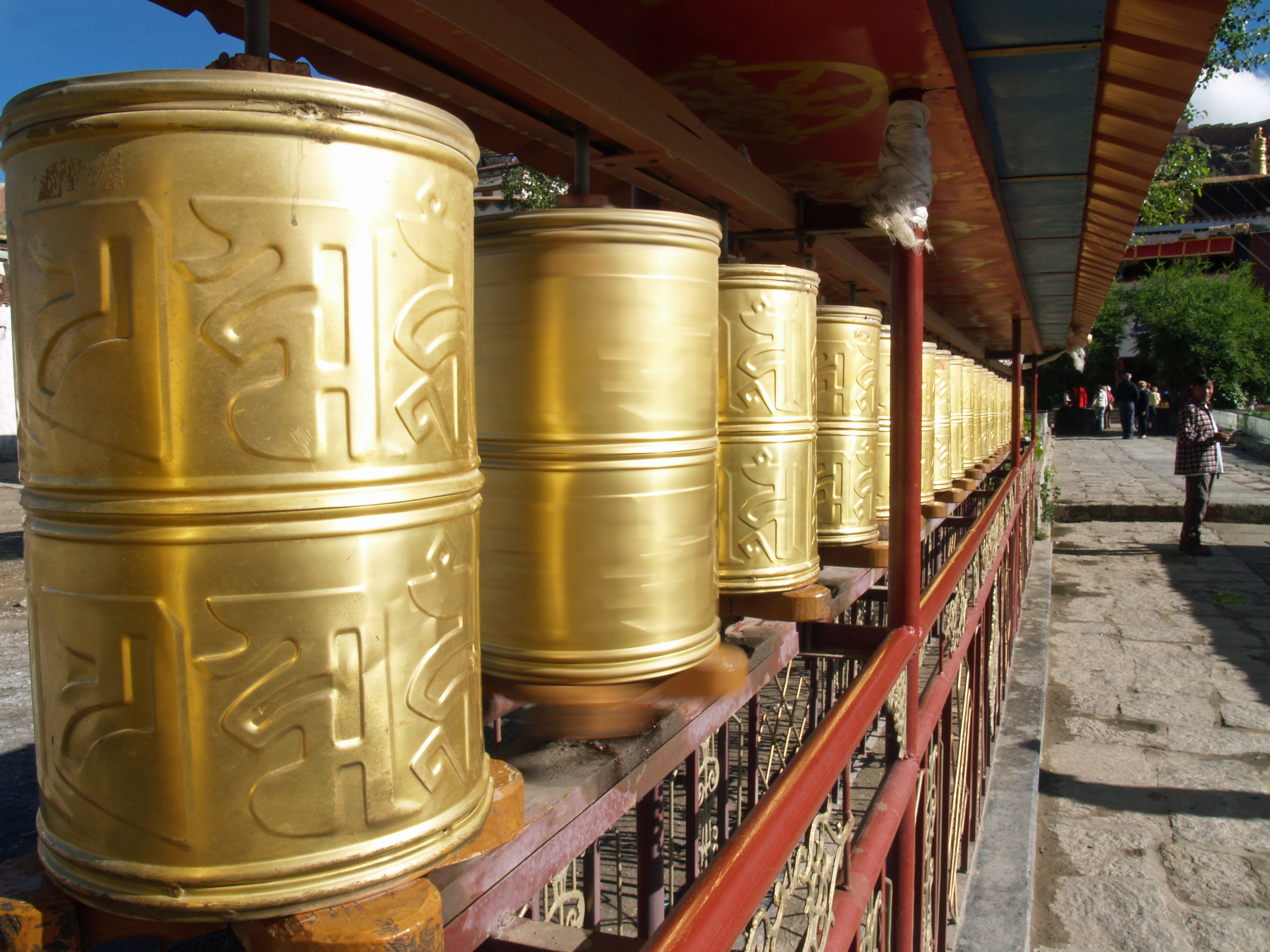
Left: Palcho Monastery with walkway lined by prayer wheels. Right: Close view of Prayer wheels

Tsulaklakang is the main temple. It has an Assembly Hall called as 'Tshomchen' in Tibetan and well preserved. The structure has three floors and has well-preserved murals and images of the fifteenth century.

The ground floor has at the entry itself four images of Four Guardian Kings. At the entrance to the main Assembly hall, there is a protector shrine called Gonkhang. The impressive 48 pillared hall is decorated with numerous silk Tankhas, images of Sakya protectors, frescoes of frightening scenes of charnel grounds and several original paintings and sculptures, in 15th century Tibetan style. The Sakya protectors depicted are: Panjurantha (Gompa Gur), Six-Armed Mahakala, Sri Devi and Ekajati. The inner sanctum in the Main Chapel has idols of Buddhas of the Three Times with a bronze statue of Shakyamuni Buddha as the main deity at the centre. This image is 8 metres (26 ft) in height and is made from about 14,000 kilograms (31,000 lb) of copper. The three Buddha images are also flanked by images of Manjughosha and Maitreya in standing posture. The entire interior chapel walls are painted with scenes from the Sutras of the Auspicious Acon (Bhadrakalpikasutra). In the Vajradhatu Chapel (Dorje Ying Lhakhang) on the west, Sarvavid Vairochana's statue made in clay is deified and is surrounded by four meditational Buddhas. A gold-inscribed manuscript of Kangyur dated 1431 is also on display here. The Royal Chapel (Chogyel Lakhang) depicts clay images of the ancient kings. Images of Atisha, Kamalashila, Padmasambhava, Shantarakshita, Manjushri, eleven-faced Avalokiteshwara, Vajrapani and Shakyashri of Kashmir are also seen in this chapel. The large statue of Maitreya at the centre of this chapel is said to be a later addition. The south wall of this chapel depicts a Reliquary of Prince Rabten Kunzang Phak (founder of the temple) in a recessed chamber and also many volumes of canonical texts.

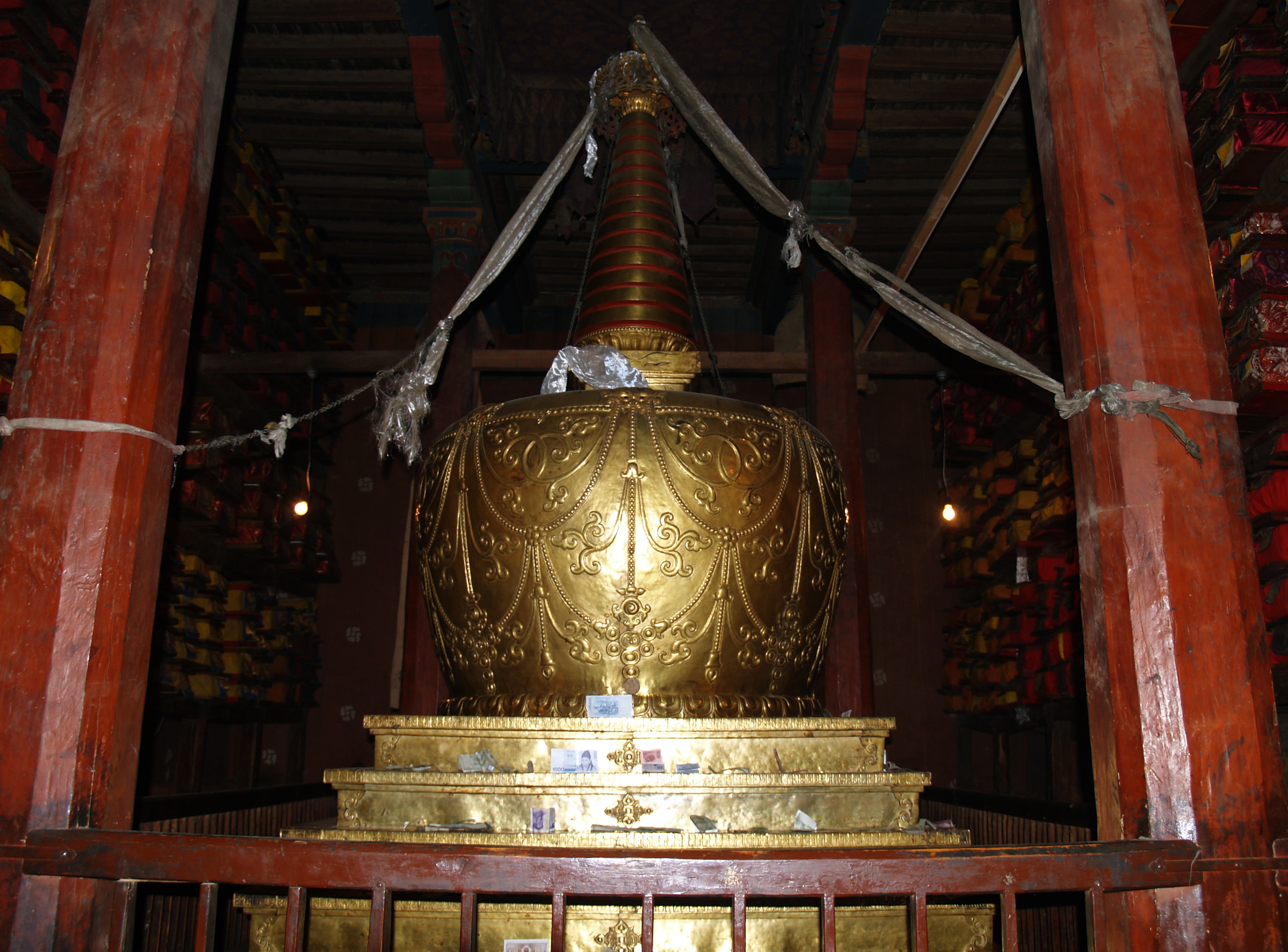
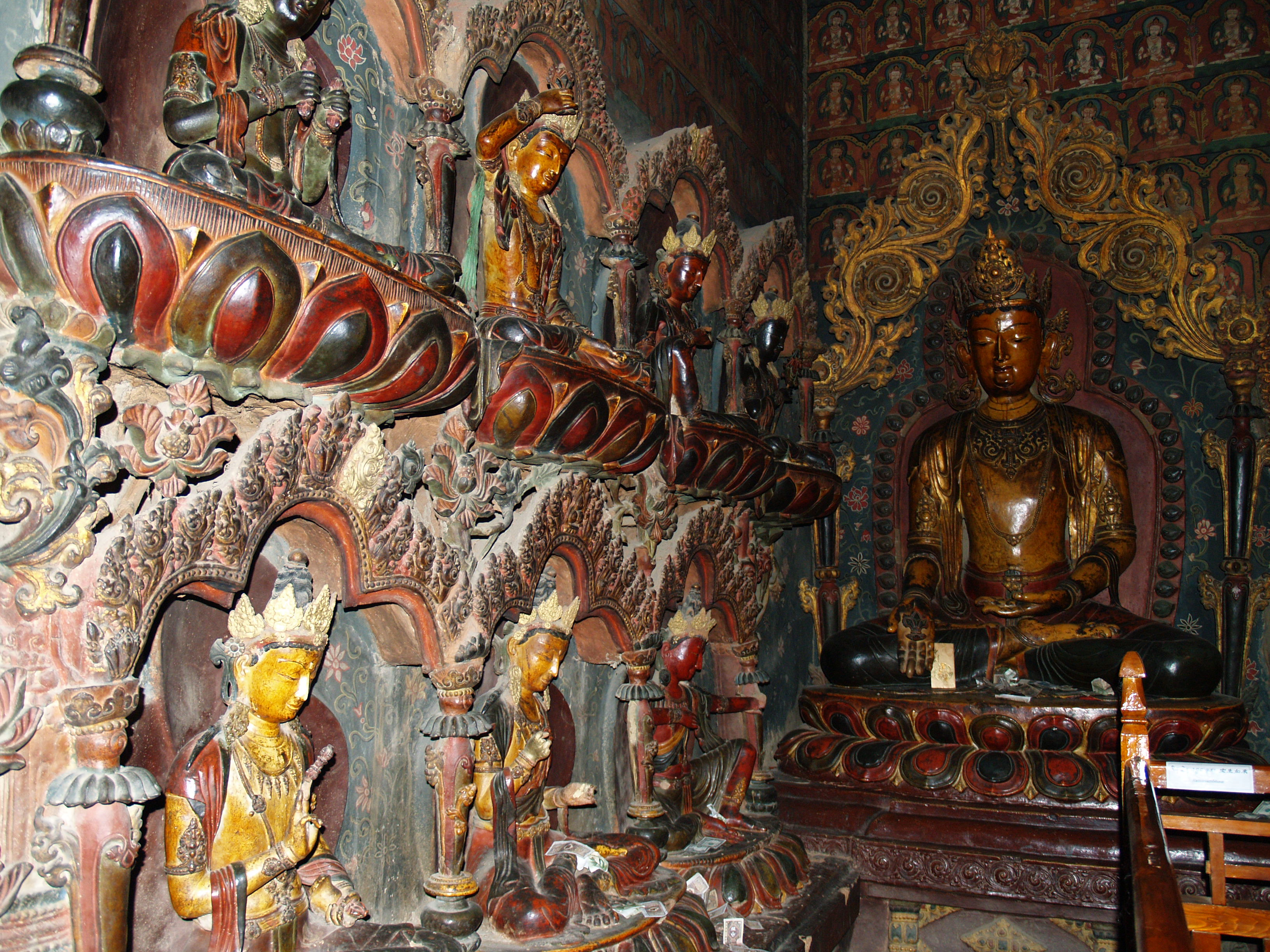
Left: Reliquary of Prince Rabten Kunzang Phak. Right: Shakyamuni Buddha

The upper floor has five chapels. It houses clay images of Sakyapa lineage. The prominent images seen here are: the three-dimensional model of mandala palace of the deity Cakrasaṃvara, yogic poses of eighty four Mahasiddhas of ancient India, Maitreya Chapel and a sacred small image of Tara. The Tsongkhapa Chapel on the same floor has images of Tsongkhapa, Dalai Lama VII, Shakyamuni, Buton Rinchen Drub, Sakya Pandita, Padmasambhava and the Sakyapa lamas of the Lamdre lineage. Neten Lakhang is another Chapel, which has Chinese-style images of Sixteen Elders, aside from images of the Five Aspects of Manjushri and the Four Guardian Kings.

On the top floor, is the Zhalyekhang chapel, which has 15 mandalas of 8 metres (26 ft) diameter painted on the walls, associated with meditational deities. Images of Jowo Shakyamuni, Maitreya, Manjushri, Tsongkhapa with his disciples, Amitayus, Tara, Sitatapatra and Padmasambhava are depicted. The chapels on this floor also contain images of Amitabha Buddha, Dakinis and esoteric murals.

=== Zhacang (hall for the monks) ===
Zhacang is the residential quarters of the monks. There is separate hall for each sect.

=== Murals ===
Murals on themes of "Esoteric and Exoteric Buddhism", and the story of the Buddha are found in profusion in the monastery.

=== Gyantse Fort ===
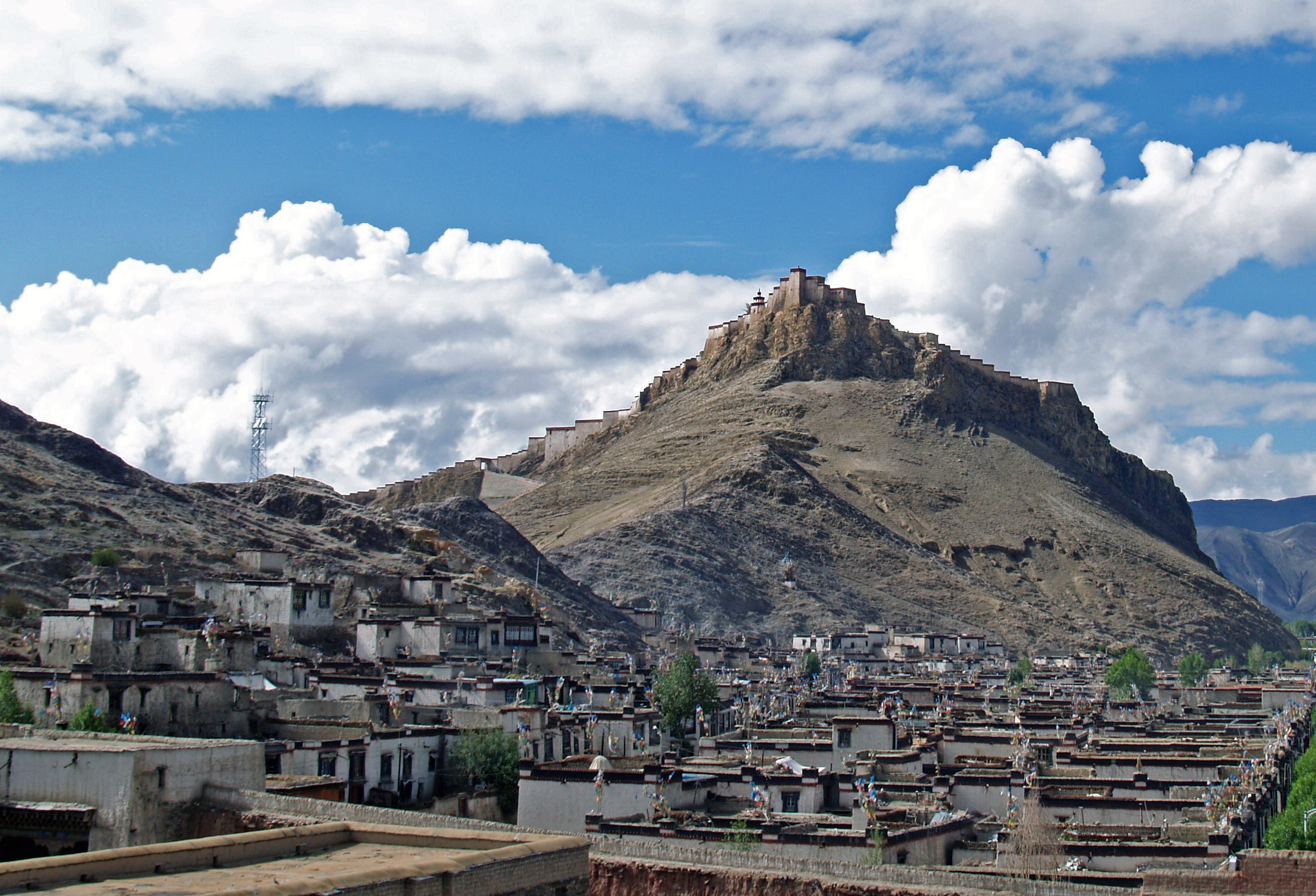
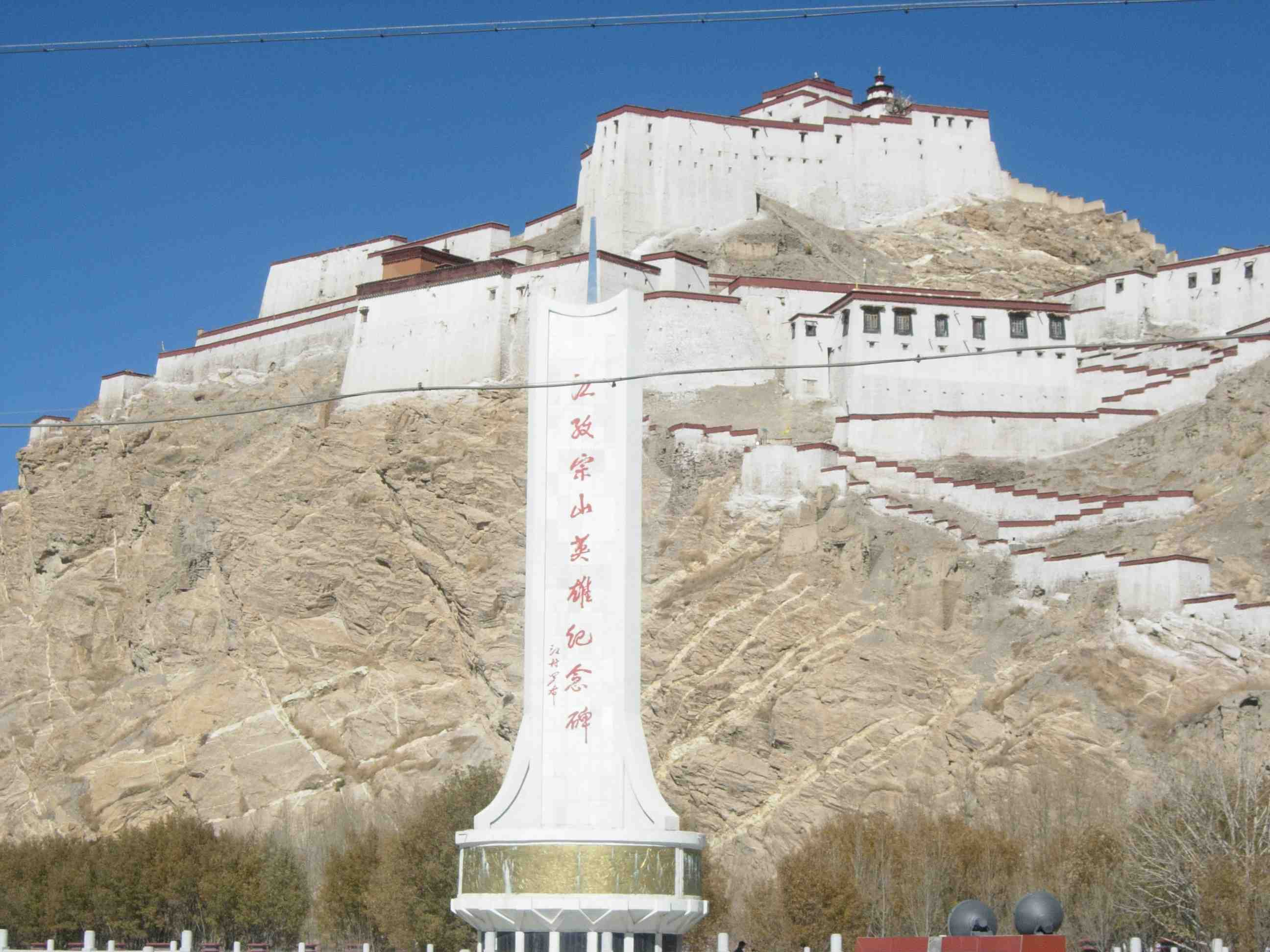
Left: the Gyantse Dzong with Gyantse village in the foreground. Right: Gyantse Fortress

Gyantse Fort or Gyantse Dzong (Jiangzi Dzong) built on the rugged hills surrounding the Gyantze town (once the third largest town in Tibet) has an arresting presence behind the town. The fortress is dated to 1268 and a castle was also built inside by local Prince Phakpa Pelzangpo (1318–1370) who was influential with the Sakyapa overlords. Buddhist guru Butan Rinchen Drub of Zhalu resided here at the invitation of the prince and made it his religious seat. Later, in the 14th century, the palace was moved from the fort to the Gyantse town where Kunga Phakpa had built a larger complex of buildings and monasteries. During this period, he also built a temple on the hill top called the Sampel Rinchenling. However, this is seen only in ruins now except for some murals made in genuine Newari and Gyantse Tibetan styles.

== Festival ==
The most popular festival celebrated in the monastery is held on 15 April. It is known as the Saka Dawa festival to commemorate Sakyamuni, the founder of Buddhism; this day is said to mark his birthday and also the day of his death. On this occasion, five hundred Lamas chant sutras when local people attend. Horse racing and archery festivals are held in the middle of fourth lunar month.

== Visitor information ==
Pelkhor Choede in Gyantse town is located about 230 kilometres (140 mi) to the south of Lhasa and 100 kilometres (62 mi) to east of Shigatse. The monastery is a short walk from the heart of the town. The Friendship Highway that connects Kathmandu, Nepal to Lhasa passes through Gyantse.

== Gallery ==
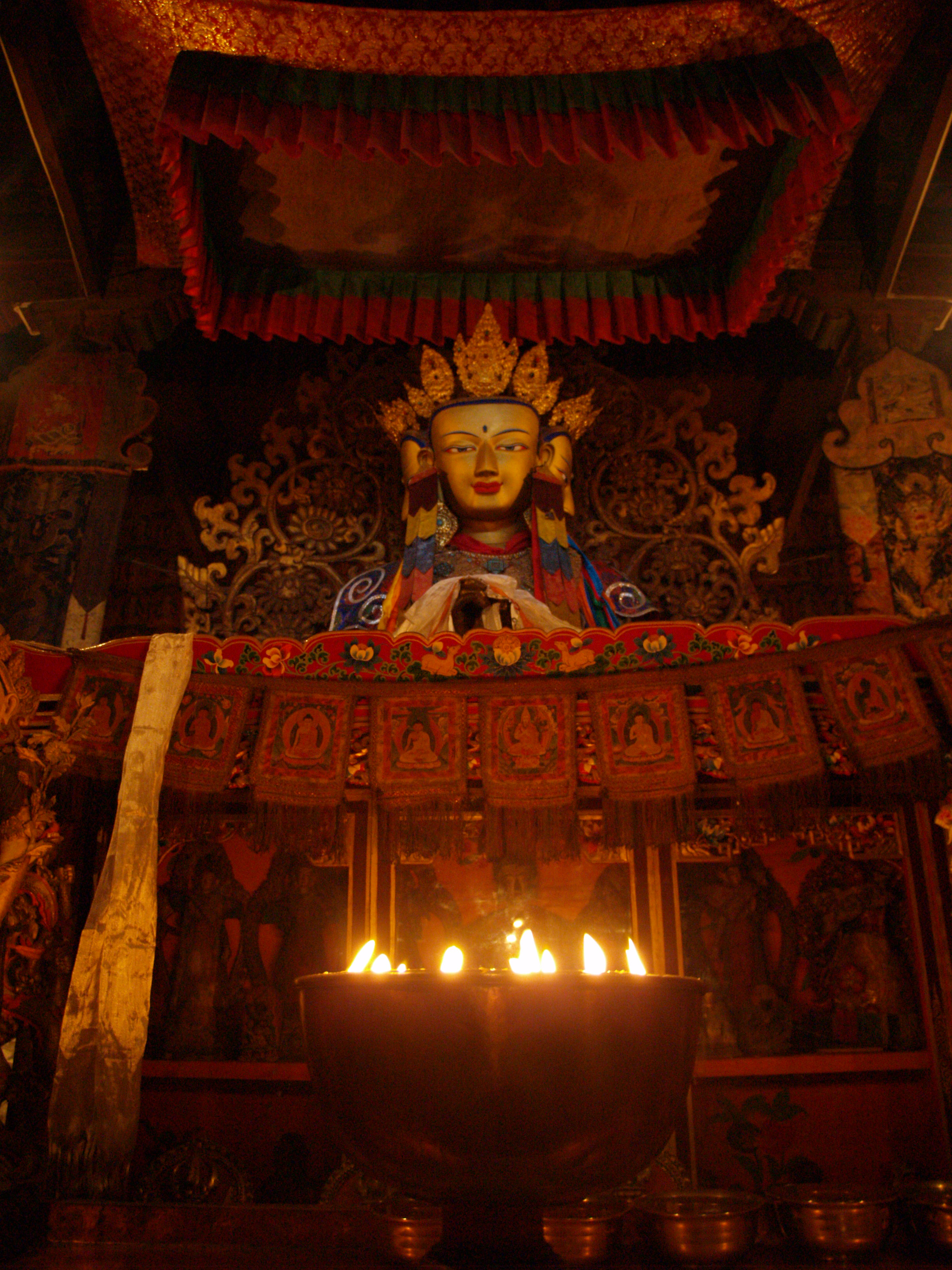
Yak butter lamps

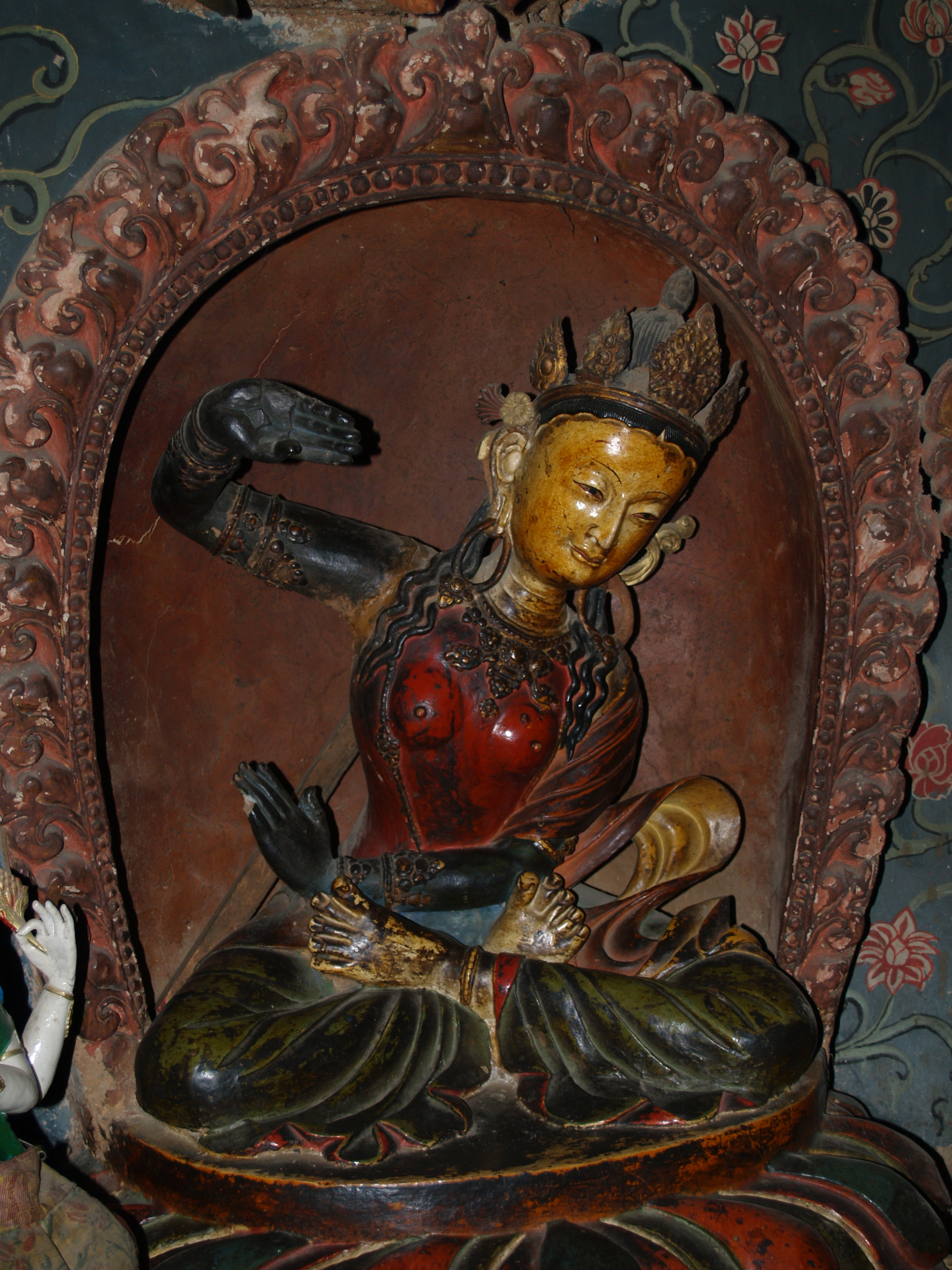
Buddhist artwork

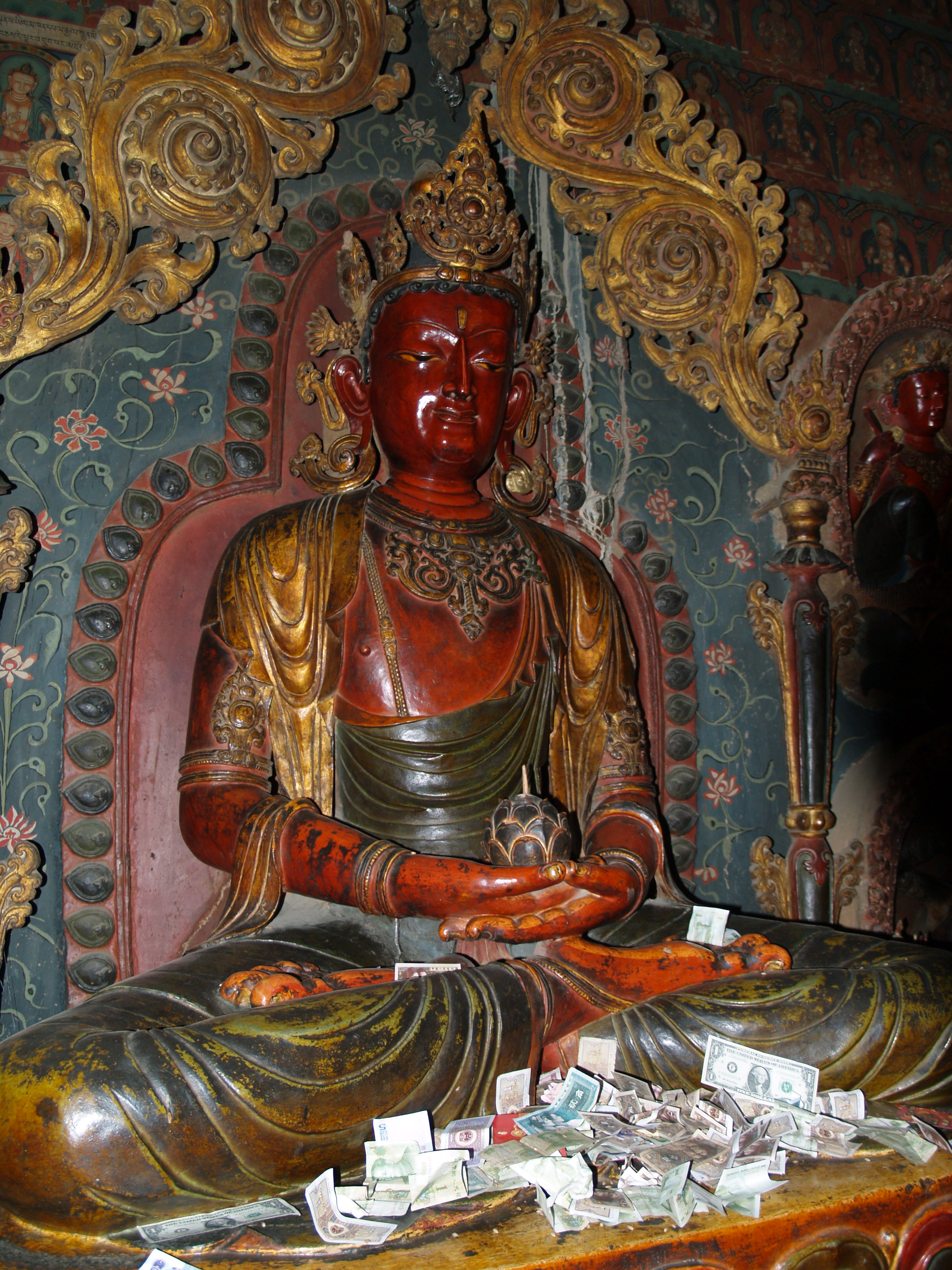
Buddhist artwork

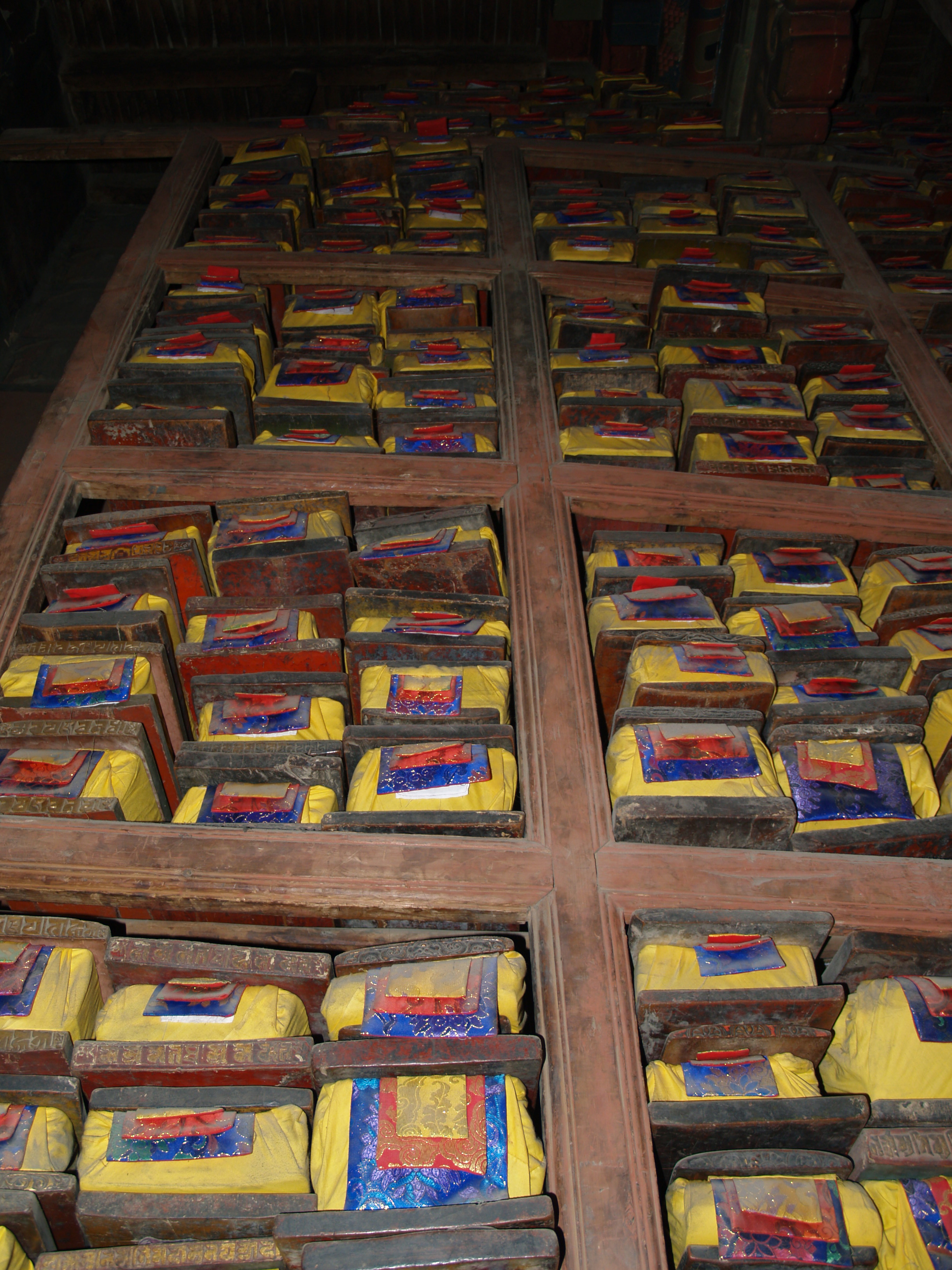
Buddhist scriptures

== See also ==
- Great Stupa of Universal Compassion

== Literature ==
- von Schroeder, Ulrich. 2001. Buddhist Sculptures in Tibet. Vol. One: India & Nepal; Vol. Two: Tibet & China. (Volume One: 655 pages with 766 illustrations; Volume Two: 675 pages with 987 illustrations). Hong Kong: Visual Dharma Publications, Ltd. ISBN 962-7049-07-7: dPal ’khor chos sde («palkhor chöde»), pp. 553, 699, 703, 870–881; Figs. XIII–35–40; Pls. 201–204; dPal ’khor gTsug lag khang («palkhor tsuglagkhang»), pp. 553, 870–881, 1245, 1246; Fig. XIII–35; Pls. 201–204; dPal ’khor mchod rten («palkhor chöden») also known as sKu ’bum («kumbum»), pp. 553, 703 n. 484; 870–873, 1245; Figs. XIII–36–40; Byams pa mchod pa lha khang («champa chöpa lhakhang») on the upper floor of the dPal ’khor gTsug lag khang («palkhor tsuglagkhang»), p. 870; Pls. 37C, 169C, 224D, 231C, 234C, 271C, 277D, 280B, 280C, 280E, 304C, 314C, 317C, 317E, 319C, 322E–F, 327D; Chos rgyal lha khang («chögyal lhakhang»), now known as rGyal ba Byams pa’i lha khang («champey lhakhang»), on the ground floor of the dPal ’khor gTsug lag khang, p. 870; rDo rje dbyings lha khang («dorjeying lhakhang») on the ground floor of the dPal ’khor gTsug lag khang, p. 870; mGon khang («gönkhang») on the ground floor of the dPal ’khor gTsug lag khang, p. 870; Jo bo’i lha khang («jowö lhakhang»), or gTsang khang («tsangkhang») on the ground floor of the dPal ’khor gTsug lag khang, p. 870; Pls. 140A, 212A–B, 232A, 233C, 254B, 267B, 347C; Lam ’bras lha khang («lamdre lhakhang») on the upper floor of the dPal ’khor gTsug lag khang, pp. 870, 874–881; Pls. 201–204; gNas brtan lha khang («neden lhakhang») on the upper floor of the dPal ’khor gTsug lag khang, pp. 870, 1245; Pl. 172D.
