= List of Buddhist temples in the Tibet Autonomous Region =

Wikimedia article list

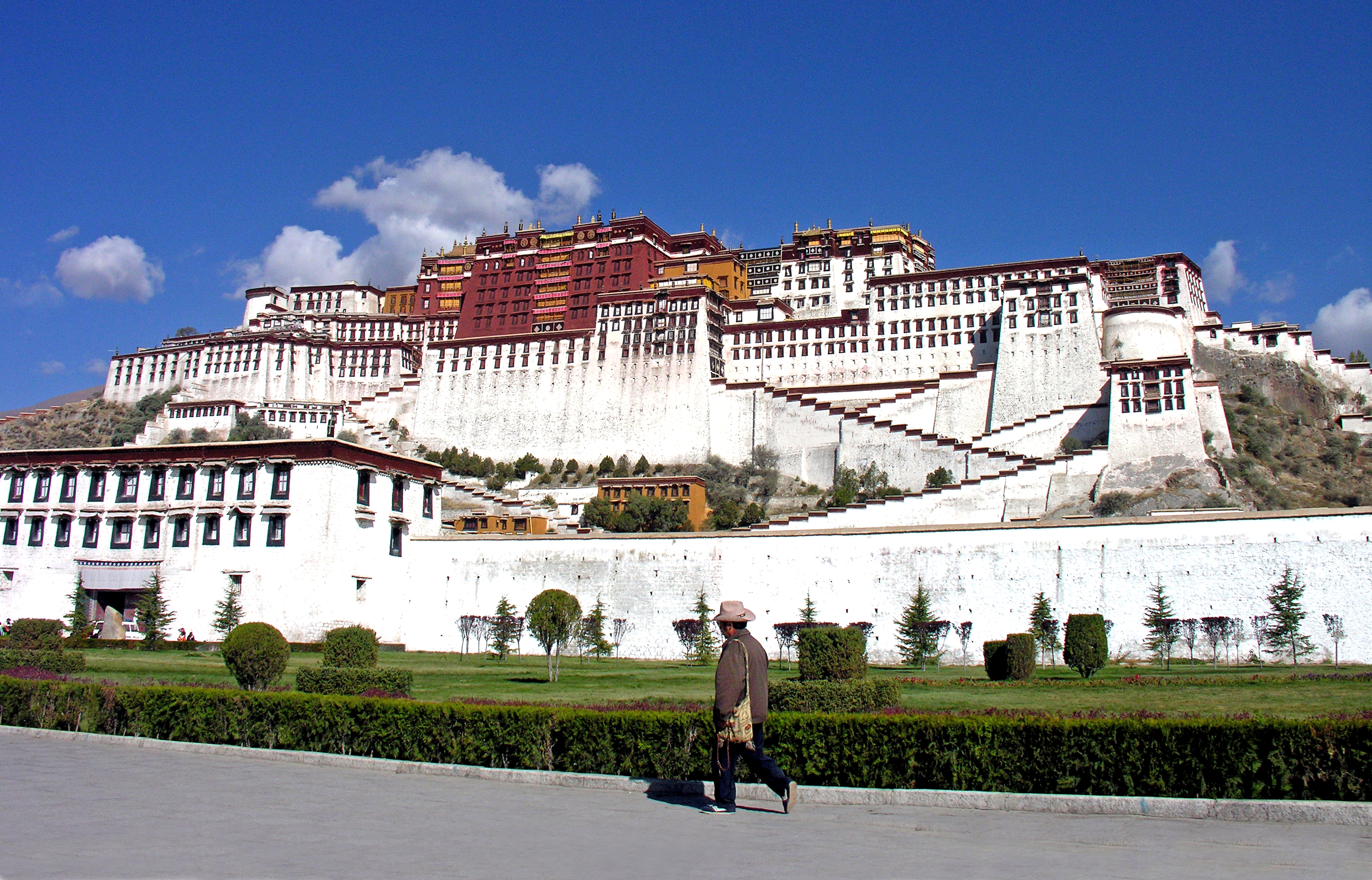
The Potala Palace in Lhasa, Tibet

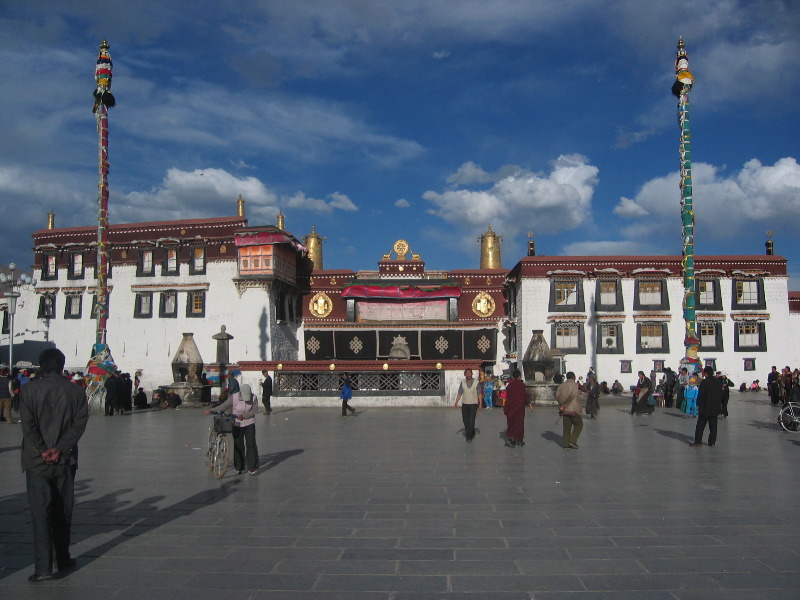
The Jokhang Temple in Lhasa, Tibet

This is a list of Buddhist temples, monasteries, stupas, and pagodas in the Tibet Autonomous Region for which there are Wikipedia articles.

- Chokorgyel Monastery
- Dorje Drak
- Drepung Monastery
- Drongtse Monastery
- Dzogchen Monastery
- Ganden Monastery
- Jokhang Monastery
- Kathok
- Khorzhak Monastery
- Menri Monastery
- Mindrolling Monastery
- Nechung
- Palpung Monastery
- Palyul
- Ralung Monastery
- Sakya Monastery
- Samding Monastery
- Samye
- Sera Monastery
- Shechen Monastery
- Simbiling Monastery
- Surmang Monastery
- Tashi Lhunpo Monastery
- Tsi Nesar
- Tsurphu Monastery
- Yerpa

== See also ==
- List of Buddhist temples
- List of Buddhist temples in the People's Republic of China
- Tibetan architecture
- Tibetan Buddhism
