= Nyawon Kunga Pal =

Jonang master

Nyawon Kunga Pal (Tibetan: nya dbon kun dga' dpal; 1285–1379) was an early master of Tibetan Buddhism. In his later years he was the founder of the Tsechen Monastery (rtse chen dgon), which was founded in 1366 under the sponsorship of Prince Phakpa Pelzangpo (1318–1370), Gyantse's first prince. It was one of the most important sites of the Jonangpa in Central Tibet. It is situated on a mountainside near the Great Stupa of Gyantse (rgyal rtse Chos sde).

Nyawon Kunga Pal's primary teachers were Dolpopa Sherab Gyaltsen (dol po pa shes rab rgyal mtshan; 1292–1361) and Chogle Namgyal (phyogs las rnam rgyal; 1306–1386), from whom he received many teachings such as the Kalachakra. His 'Od gsal rgyan gyi bshad pa, an important treatise on shentong (gzhan stong) from the experience of Vajrayoga practice, is contained in the Jo nang dpe tshogs (Jonang Publication Series, vol. 32).

According to James Gentry Nyawon Kunga Pal played some role in inspiring Peldzin's (dpal 'dzin) anti-Old School polemic ("the most extensive anti–Old School polemic ever composed").

== See also ==
- Drung Kashiwa Rinchen Pel (in German)
