= Unen =

Unen (Buryat and Mongolian: Үнэн [uˈnəŋ], Oirat: Үнн [yˈnən], Russian: Унэн truth) refers to several newspapers in Mongolia and Mongolian-speaking parts of Russia:

- Mongoliin Ünen (Mongolia)
- Buryaad Ünen (Buryatia)

== See also ==
- Broad Front UNEN, an Argentine political party
