= Buryat alphabet =

Buryat alphabet can refer to:

- A Cyrillic alphabet: Cyrillic alphabets#Buryat
- A Mongolian alphabet also called Vagindra script
