= Gyangze =

Gyangze or Gyantse may refer to:

- Gyangzê County, a county in Tibet
- Gyangzê Town, a town in Tibet
- Gyantse Dzong, a fortress above the town of Gyantse, Tibet
