= Aghwan =

Aghwan may refer to:

- Aghwan language, an extinct Northeast Caucasian language
- Aghwan Dorjieff (1853–1938), a Russian-born monk of Tibetan Buddhism
