= Treaty of friendship and alliance between the Government of Mongolia and Tibet =

1913 treaty between Mongolia and Tibet

Chinese name
- Traditional Chinese: 蒙藏條約
- Simplified Chinese: 蒙藏条约
Transcriptions
Standard Mandarin
- Hanyu Pinyin: Měng Zàng Tiáoyuē

Tibetan name
- Tibetan: བོད་སོག་ཆིངས་ཡིག་

Mongolian name
- Mongolian Cyrillic: Монгол-Төвөдийн гэрээ Mongol-Tövödiin geree ᠮᠣᠩᠭᠣᠯ ᠲᠥᠪᠡᠳ ᠦᠨ ᠭᠡᠷ᠎ᠡ

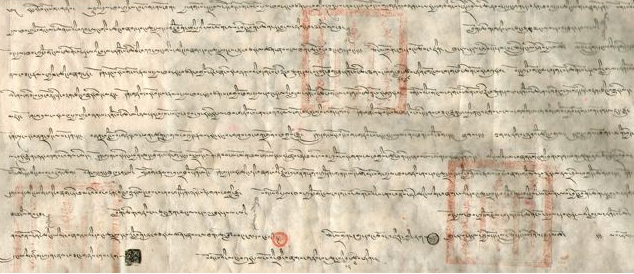
The treaty written in Tibetan, with official seals.

A Treaty of friendship and alliance between the Government of Mongolia and Tibet was signed on 11 January 1913 (corresponding to 29 December 1912 of the Julian calendar), at Urga (now Ulaanbaatar).

This treaty's text in Mongolian was published by the Mongolian Academy of Sciences in 1982, and in 2007 an original copy in Tibetan language and script surfaced from Mongolian archives.

There have been questions about the authority of a Tibetan negotiator, Dorjiev, to conclude such a treaty, being he was both a Russian subject and ethnically Buryat.

== Treaty's signing and validity ==
During the Xinhai Revolution against the Qing dynasty, both Tibet and Outer Mongolia declared their formal independence from China under theocratic heads of states, and both had had no success in gaining official recognition from the Republic of China. In the treaty signed on 11 January 1913, Mongolia and Tibet declared mutual recognition and allegiance. Both sides declared mutual relationships based on the "Yellow religion" (Gelug sect of Buddhism), obliged to provide aid each other against "internal and external enemies", declared free trade etc.(see for facsimile of Mongolian and Tibetan originals and for comments to text). The Mongolian representatives signing the treaty were foreign minister Da Lama Ravdan and commander-in-chief Manlaibaatar Damdinsüren. The Tibetan representatives who signed this document were Dalai Lama's representative Agvan Dorjiev, a Buryat, i.e. subject of Russia, and Tibetan officials in Mongolia: Ngawang Choizin, Yeshe Gyatso and Gendun Kalsang. There existed some doubts to the validity of this treaty: the 13th Dalai Lama denied that he had authorized Dorjiev to negotiate political issues. It was supposed more important that neither the cleric nor the Tibetan government appeared to have ever ratified the treaty. Nevertheless, such ratification in that time monarchic Mongolia and Tibet was not necessary.

The Russian government maintained that, as a Russian subject, Dorjiev could not possibly act in a diplomatic capacity on behalf of the Dalai Lama. Nevertheless, before signing the treaty, Dorjiev met in Mongolia I. Ya. Korostovets, Russian plenipotentiary in Urga, and told him that Tibet wants to come in treaties with Mongolia and Russia. Korostovets, having mentioned that "Khlakha (Outer Mongolia) had just declared its independence, recognized by Russia", had no objections against conclusion of treaty between Mongolia and Tibet, but he was against a treaty of Tibet with Russia

According to the 14th Dalai Lama, this treaty was signed under the reign of the 13th Dalai Lama.

There are data that the treaty signed by Russia with Mongolia in 1912 (i.e. before signing the treaty with Tibet) meant international recognition of Mongolia as a state which was not required a sanction from a third side; as a result, the treaty between Tibet and Mongolia is considered as de jure recognition of Tibet as a state.

In any case, the independence of both Tibet and Mongolia continued being unrecognized in international law although Russia and the United Kingdom continued to recognize at least the suzerainty of the Republic of China over these areas. Russia and the UK were more comfortable with formally recognizing China's suzerainty and keeping an ambivalent position towards Mongolia and Tibet's independence. In addition, there was also a concern among Russia and UK that recognizing Tibetan or Mongolian independence would allow those areas to come under the other power's influence, respectively, a situation which all concerned believed to be worse than a situation in which those areas were nominally under the control of a weak China.

== Aftermath ==
News of the treaty aroused considerable suspicion amongst the British negotiators at the Simla Convention, who feared that Russia might use the treaty to gain influence on Tibetan matters. While China ultimately did not sign the Simla Convention, a similar treaty, the tripartite Treaty of Kyakhta, was signed by Mongolia, the Republic of China and Russia on 25 May 1915. The agreement affirmed Mongolia's complete autonomy in internal matters and Russian privileges in Mongolia, and at the same time formally recognized China's suzerainty over the country. The modern state of Mongolia considers Tibet to be a part of China.

== See also ==
- History of Mongolia
- History of Tibet
