= Drongtse Monastery =

Tibetan Buddhist monastery in Tsang, Tibet, China

- Tibetan transcription(s); Tibetan: འབྲོང་རྩེ་དགོན; Wylie transliteration: vbrong rtse dgon Chinese transcription(s); Traditional: 重孜寺; Simplified: 重孜寺
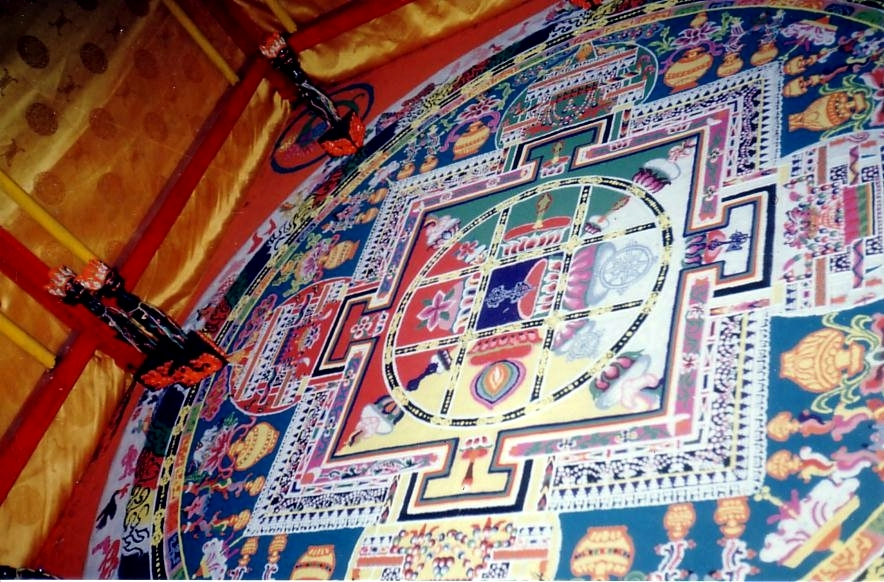
- Sand Mandala, Drongste, 1993.

- Location within Tibet

Religion
- Affiliation: Tibetan Buddhism
- Sect: Gelug

Location
- Location: Tsang, Tibet, China
- Interactive map of Drongtse Monastery
- Coordinates: 29.019°N 89.451°E

Drongtse Monastery ('Brong rtse; Pinyin: Zhongze) is a Tibetan Buddhist monastery was formerly one of the most important Gelug monasteries in Tsang, Tibet. There was also a chorten there.

Drongtse Monastery, is 19 km northwest of Gyantse and 14 km north of Tsechen Monastery, on the "Southern Friendship Highway" to Shigatse, and just 6 km south of the site of the early Tsi Nesar temples. It was almost totally destroyed during the Cultural Revolution, but has been partially restored since, and the Assembly Hall was rebuilt in the 1980s, though many of the main buildings remain in ruins.

The original four-storied monastery was on a "rocky eminence" about 300 ft (91 m) above the village. The wall was already partly ruined when Sarat Chandra Das visited in 1881. The du-khang or congregation hall, which could seat about eighty monks, contained some very old gilt images including one of Jowo Shakyamuni said to be a copy by an Indian artist of the famous and much-revered image housed at the Jokhang in Lhasa. It also contained a picture of Lozang Gyatso, the 5th Dalai Lama (note: Das wrongly refers to him as the 1st Dalai Lama), being given political power over Tibet by the Mongol conqueror, Güshi Khan, after the king of Tsang was deposed in 1642.

The monastery was, according to some, founded by Lhatsun Chenpo (Je Lha-tsun), and was the birthplace of Lobsang Palden Chophel or the Sengchen ('Lion') Lama.

Other sources attribute the founding in the same year to the yogin and ascetic, Rinchen Gyatso, fulfilling a prophecy of Tsongkhapa. Later on, it was adopted as a branch monastery of Tashilhunpo. There is a small chapel behind the monastery with rock-carved images of Padmasambhava, Tara, Amitayus and other deities.

The Thirty-Second Ganden Tripa, Tsultrim Chopel (1561-1623) received his monastic education at Drongtse Monastery as a young boy. Lobzang Tsultrim (1745 - 1800) began his training at Drongtse at age 10.
