= Mongolian Academy of Sciences =

Scientific organization based in Mongolia

- Монгол улсын Шинжлэх ухааны Академи
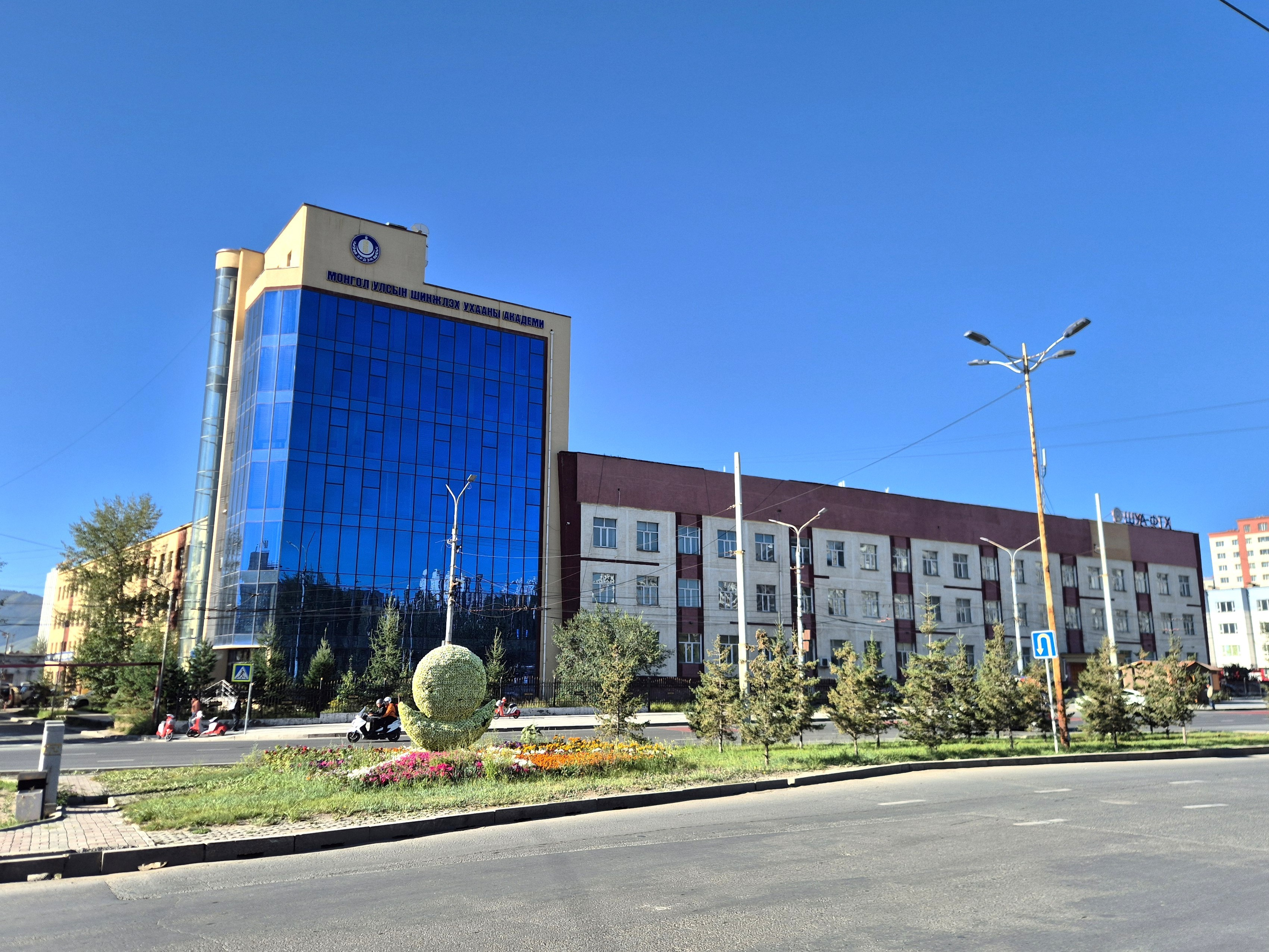
- Abbreviation: MAS
- Formation: 1921
- Website: mas.ac.mn
- Formerly called: Institute of Literature and Scripts; Institute of Sciences; Institute of Sciences and Higher Education

The Mongolian Academy of Sciences (MAS; Mongolian: Монгол улсын Шинжлэх ухааны Академи, Mongol ulsyn Shinjlekh ukhaany Akademi) is Mongolia's first centre of modern sciences. It came into being in 1921 when the government of newly independent Mongolia issued a resolution declaring the establishment of "The Institute of Literature and Scripts", which was later upgraded into "The Institute of Sciences" and "The Institute of Sciences and Higher Education". In 1961, it was finally reorganized as "The Mongolian Academy of Sciences" MAS. At present there are 14 research institutes and two affiliated academies under MAS.

== Status ==
The law "on the Legal Status of the Mongolian Academy of Sciences" ratified by the State Great Hural (Parliament) of Mongolia promulgated the Mongolian Academy of Sciences as the central scientific thinktank, whose aim is to develop science and advanced technology in the country. The Mongolian Academy of Sciences is a civil self-governed non-commercial organization.

== Organization ==
General Assembly of MAS, the Presidium and President of MAS constitute management bodies of MAS.

=== General Assembly ===
The Supreme governing body of MAS is its General Assembly which consists of all members of the academy. The general assembly of MAS held an assembly meeting 2 or more times a year. The members of the academy are elected by their merit that a number of members approved by Mongolian government. There are 63 full members in 2021.

The general assembly of MAS is focused on following issues:

To deliberate on important issues concerning science and technology To solve the main changes of MAS's law, regulations, strategy and other resolutions To provide a think tank recommendation to the Mongolian Government and its social economic development. To elect full members, president, vice-presidents and general secretary of the MAS

The General Assembly addresses the following issues:

1. the development policy of science and technology, outcomes of scientific projects, methods for technology transfer and assisting the Government in science and technology policy,
2. to assess and evaluate the economic and social development issues of Mongolia, advise the Government the Parliament and the President of the country on decision-making,
3. determines the principal directions and priorities of MAS fundamental research,
4. approves the MAS Presidium Report on scientific achievements by MAS and scientific research work done by the Presidium since the previous election of the academy members.
5. elects the Academy President, Vice Presidents and Secretary-General for a term of four years.

=== President and Presidium ===
The Presidium of MAS is a permanent collegiate body of MAS management. The MAS Presidium reports to the MAS General Assembly; the Presidium presents to the General Assembly a report on the most important resolutions adopted during the period between the MAS General Assembly sessions. The President of the academy acts as the science and technology adviser to the Prime Minister and the President of Mongolia.

=== Affiliated academies ===
There are two affiliated Academies to MAS. They are the Academy of Medical Science and the Agricultural Academy.

=== Academic sub-assemblies ===
Academic Sub-Assemblies are the principal scientific research authorities. Members of Sub-Assemblies consist from full academy members, leading researchers, professors from universities, research institutes and government agencies.

The total number of Sub-Assembly Members are 200.

There are six academic Sub-Assemblies:

1. Sub-Assembly of Physics, Mathematics and Informatics;
2. Sub-Assembly of Chemistry and Biology;
3. Sub-Assembly of Geology, Geography and Environmental;
4. Sub-Assembly of Technician and Technology;
5. Sub-Assembly of Social Sciences;
6. Sub-Assembly of Humanities.

The principal objectives of the MAS academic sectors are to develop fundamental research by the scientific subsectors; coordinate, analyze and forecast scientific development; and provide methodological guidelines to the institutes within the Sub-Assembly. Academic Sub-Assemblies accredit and publish the scientific field-specific journals.

The Academic Sub-Assemblies address following issues:

1. discuss the progress and the results of scientific research conducted within each scientific sub-assembly;
2. discuss, assess and evaluate project final reports and submit them to the appropriate organizations;
3. discuss and evaluate scientific publications, proceedings, books and research materials to be submitted for publication.

== Institutes of the Mongolian Academy of Sciences ==
MAS has 16 research institutes.

- Institute of History and Ethnology
- Institute of Philosophy
- Institute of International Studies
- Institute of Mathematics and Digital Technology
- Botanic Garden and Research Institute
- Institute of Archaeology
- Institute of Geology
- Institute of Physics and Technology
- Institute of Paleontology
- Institute of Geography and Geoecology
- Institute of Astronomy and Geophysics
- Institute of Chemistry and Chemical Technology
- Institute of Biology
- Institute of Language and Literature
- Brain and Mind Research Institute

== International cooperation ==
International cooperation plays an important role in improving science and technology, training of talents, upgrading experimental conditions, and exchanging information. As Mongolia lies at the crossroads between Europe and Asia, MAS has cooperative arrangements with scientific organizations in Europe and Asia. The Mongolian Academy of Sciences is a national member of the International Council for Science (ICSU), Association of Academies of Sciences in Asia (AASA), Science Council of Asia (SCA) and The World Academy of Sciences (TWAS). At present, the Mongolian Academy of Sciences has established formal contacts with over 100 national academic and research organizations on more than 30 countries, in addition to various kinds of cooperative arrangements on mutually interested areas. In 1982, the Mongolian Academy of Sciences published the text of the Treaty of friendship and alliance between the Government of Mongolia and Tibet in the Mongolian language.

== See also ==
- Treaty of friendship and alliance between the Government of Mongolia and Tibet
