= Tsechen Monastery and Dzong =

Monastery near Gyantse, China

Tsechen Monastery
- Tibetan transcription(s); Tibetan: བརྩེ་ཆེན་ཆོས་སྡེ Chinese transcription(s); Simplified: 紫金寺; Pinyin: zǐjīn sì
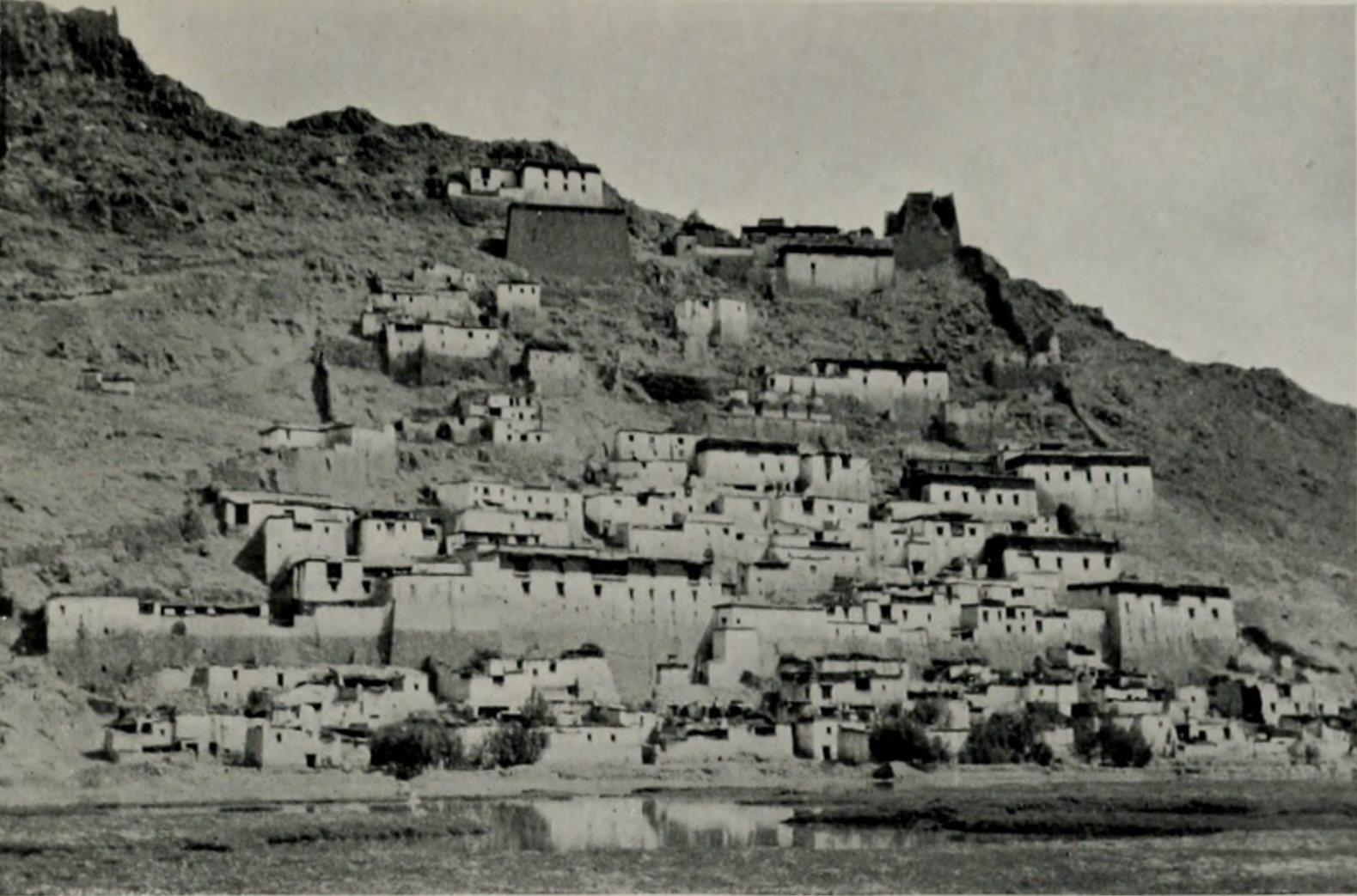
- Tsechen Monastery and Dzong in Gyantse, Tibet in 1904

- Location within Tibet

Religion
- Affiliation: Tibetan Buddhism
- Sect: Sakya
- Deity: Buton Rinchenpa
- Leadership: Kunga Lodru (incarnation of Buton Rinchenpa

Location
- Location: Tsang, Tibet, China
- Country: China
- Interactive map of Tsechen Monastery
- Coordinates: 28.9402°N 89.5572°E

Architecture
- Founder: Prince Phakpa Pelzangpo (1318-1370)

Tsechen Monastery (also known as the Tsechen Dzong or the Shambu Tsegu) was a Tibetan monastery located approximately 5 kilometres (3.1 mi) northwest of Gyantse. It was one of the largest of the fortified monasteries constructed in Tibet, and was located above a village also known as Tsechen. Constructed "on another precipitous hill about 600 feet high, about one mile long, and rising abruptly out of the plain", the monastery was similar to the Gyantse Dzong in terms of the strength of its fortifications. During the 1904 British expedition to Tibet by Colonel Francis Younghusband, the monastery was occupied by Tibetan troops, which used it to resist the expedition's advance. Younghusband's forces captured the monastery and sacked and burnt it; some of the hilltop walls are all that remain of the structure.

== Early history ==
It was founded by Nyawon Kunga Pel (1285 - 1379) in 1366, under the sponsorship of Prince Phakpa Pelzangpo (1318-1370 CE), Gyantse's first prince. Nyawon Kunga Pel gave teachings to about 600 disciples in epistemology and the Kalachakra Tantra. He invited Drigung Lotsāwa Maṇikaśrījñāna (1289 - 1363) to Tsechen for teachings.

Tsechen was the seat of the kings of Gyantse until the town expanded in the 15th century. Tsongkapa's principal teacher, Remdawa Zhonu Lodro Zhonu (1349–1412), resided here. Jamyang Konchok Zangpo (1398 - 1475), the 14th Throne Holder of Jokhang Monastery, held the monastic seat at Tsechen for a time; Namkha Chokyong (1436 - 1507) the 14th Throne Holder of Jokhang Monastery, held the monastic seat at Tsechen for an extended period.

It was the seat of the incarnation of Buton Rinchendrub, known as Kungra Lodro.

== 20th century to present ==
In 1904, during the British expedition to Tibet, Brigadier-General James Macdonald arrived at Tsechen to oversee the expedition's progress towards Lhasa. After analysing the situation, Macdonald concluded that since Tsechen guarded the rear of the Gyantse Dzong and the road to Shigatse, it would have to be cleared of Tibetan troops before an assault could be carried out on the Gyantse Dzong. Shortly before sunset, British forces stormed the "seemingly impregnable" monastery, which was occupied by 1,200 Tibetan soldiers, and captured it; the assault had been preceded by a bombardment of the monastery using a BL 10-pounder mountain gun.

This was one of the major battles of the expedition, which aimed to reach Lhasa. The British victory "opened the road to Lhasa and effectively meant that all routes in and out of Gyantse were controlled by the British Tibet expedition". As the monastery had put up resistance it was considered "fair game" and sacked. Then, on 5 July, coinciding with the beginning of the assault on Gyantse Dzong, the monastery was set on fire, causing a "tremendous blaze" which burned throughout the night, to prevent it being reoccupied by Tibetan forces. One of the expedition's officers, Norman Rybot, noted on a drawing he made of the destroyed monastery: "Captured 28 June 04 Looted 29 June 04 Burnt 5 July 04." All that is left today are some of the walls on the hilltop. There are extensive views of the valley from the remains of the old walls.
