= Buryad Unen =

Russian main Buryat-language newspaper

Буряад үнэн
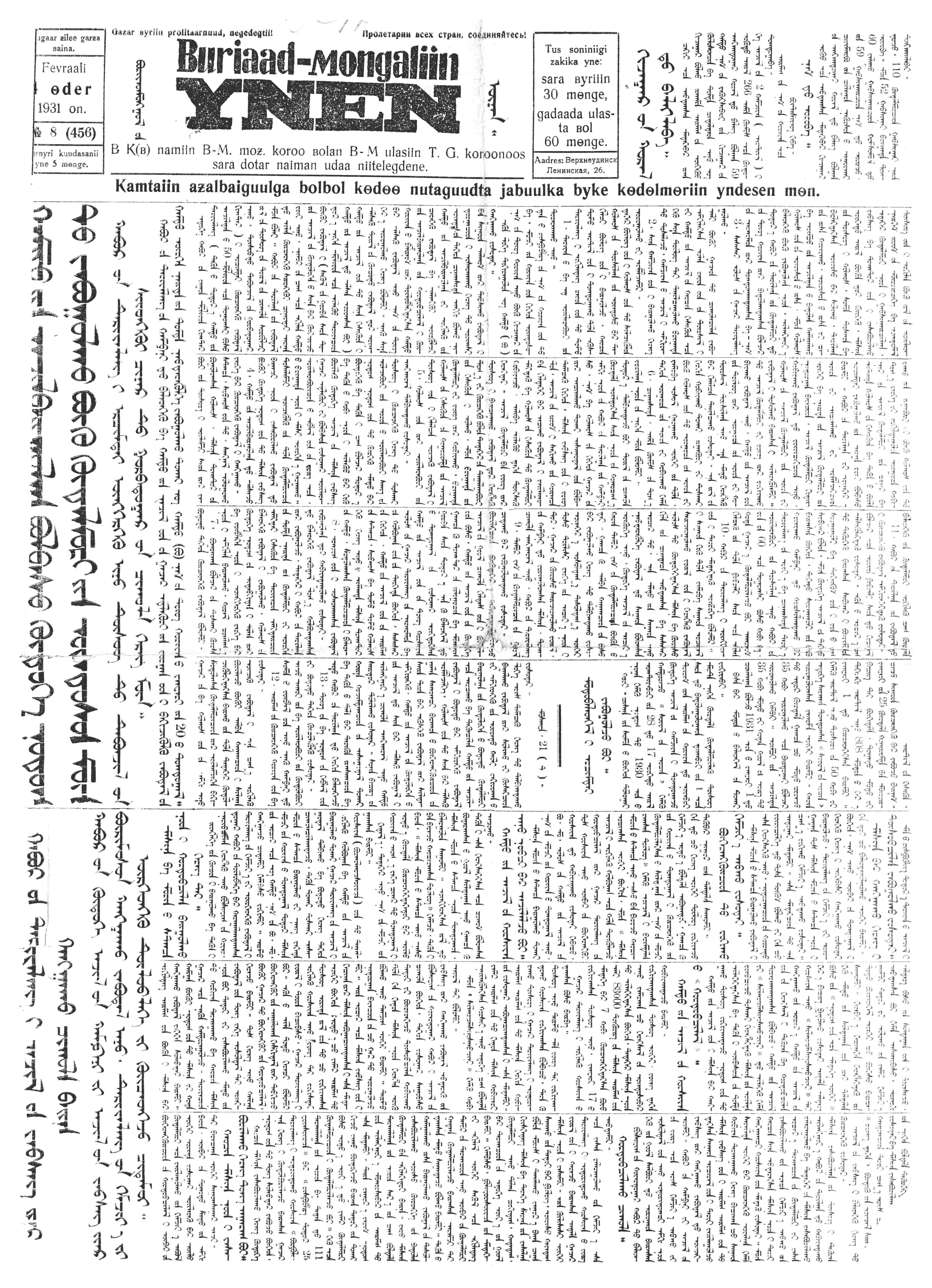
- Release for February 4, 1931
- Type: general
- Owner: Government of Burytia
- Founded: December 1921
- Language: Buryat
- Headquarters: ul. Kalandarishvili, 23; Ulan-Ude
- Circulation: c. 8,500 (1970)
- Website: burunen.ru

Buryad Unen (Russian Buryat: Буряад үнэн, [bʊrʲˈaːt uˈnəŋ], "The Buryat Truth") is the main newspaper in the Buryat language, founded in December 1921 and named after the Russian Pravda newspaper. It was originally published in the top-down Mongolian script before switching to Latin script in 1931–1938 and eventually Cyrillic script from 1939.

It was founded as Buriaad-Mongaliin ynen (Буряад-Монголиин үнэн, [bʊrʲˈaːt ˈmɔŋɡəɮiːŋ uˈnəŋ], Buryat-Mongol Truth) in 1921 in Chita, Buryat-Mongol ASSR, within Russian SFSR. Now it published in Ulan-Ude, as Chita was carved out of the Buryat-Mongol ASSR. In 1958, Buryat-Mongol ASSR removed the "-Mongol" from its official name, and the name of this newspaper followed the change. In the 1970s, it was published six times a week, with a circulation of approximately 8500.

== History of the newspaper ==
The paper was originally published in Chita. In 1923, the publication of the paper moved to Ulan-Ude. It was printed in the vertical Mongolian script, which, due to its universality, leveled the dialect differences of the Buryats and allowed carriers of different dialects to freely understand each other, which made it impossible to oppose Buryat dialects to each other.

From 1931 to 1938, the newspaper Buryad-Mongolian Unen was printed in Latin alphabet. For the first time, the Latin alphabet clearly showed the Buryat dialectal differences, but the Buryat language, written in Latin, still continued to maintain its Mongolian basis of the language: vocabulary, grammatical rules, style, etc.

In 1939, Buriiad-Mongol Unen began to be printed in Cyrillic. The basis of the new literary language took the spoken form in which the newspaper was printed in the subsequent period. In 1958, the Buryat-Mongolian ASSR was renamed the Buryat Autonomous Soviet Socialist Republic, in connection with which the newspaper Buryad-Mongoloy Unen was renamed Buryad Unen.

Starting in 2013, the company began uploading various news segments to its YouTube channel.

In 2015, the newspaper's parent company, the Buryat Ynen Information Agency, registered the company with the Federal Service for Supervision of Communications, Information Technology and Mass Media.
