= James Macdonald (British Army officer) =

British engineer, explorer, military officer and cartographer

Sir James Macdonald
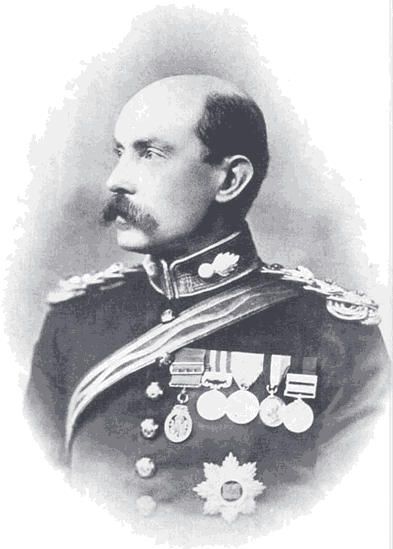
- Born: 8 February 1862; Rajamundry, Madras Presidency, British India
- Died: 27 June 1927 (aged 65); Bournemouth, England
- Military career
- Allegiance: United Kingdom
- Branch: British Army
- Service years: 1882–1912
- Rank: Major General
- Conflicts: Mahdist War; Second Boer War; Boxer Rebellion; Tibetan expedition
- Awards: Knight Commander of the Order of the Star of India; Knight Commander of the Order of the Indian Empire; Companion of the Order of the Bath

Major General Sir James Ronald Leslie Macdonald, KCSI, KCIE, CB, DL, FRGS (8 February 1862 – 27 June 1927) was a British engineer, explorer, military officer and cartographer. Born in the Madras Presidency, he was a balloon observer as a young man, surveyed for railways in British India and East Africa, explored the upper Nile region, commanded balloon sections during the Second Boer War and Boxer Rebellion and led the British expedition to Tibet in 1903–1904.

== Early career ==
Macdonald was born on 8 February 1862 in Rajahmundry in the Madras Presidency, India, the son of Surgeon-Major James Macdonald (1828–1906) of Aberdeen and Margaret Helen Leslie née Collie (1841–1876); his younger sister was the Egyptologist and archaeologist Nora Griffith. He was educated at Aberdeen Grammar School and the University of Aberdeen. He passed through the Royal Military Academy, Woolwich and was gazetted as a lieutenant to the Royal Engineers in February 1882.

As a lieutenant, on 15 May 1885, Macdonald was appointed to the corps of Bengal Sappers and Miners, Torpedo service, Calcutta on special duty as a balloon photographer. He served in the Hazara Expedition of 1888, and also working in the Indian railway organization. Macdonald had spent seven years in service in India and was in Bombay in 1891 ready to embark for England on leave when he was offered the job of Chief Engineer of "the proposed railway survey from Mombasa to the Victoria Nyanza". He accepted, and continued to England to find out what would be involved. In November 1891 he was elected a Fellow of the Royal Geographical Society.

== Uganda railway ==
The Imperial British East Africa Company (IBEA Co) commission was to survey a railway route from Mombasa on the Indian Ocean to Port Florence on the shores of Lake Victoria, roughly following the existing caravan route. The Survey began in December 1891, and took more than a year. Macdonald encountered many difficulties in his survey of 27,000 miles of possible route for the railway including sickness, attacks by ants, bees, lions and elephants, formidable physical obstacles and hostile Africans. All these took their toll on his carriers and other followers.

The survey's findings confirmed that the caravan route to the Great Rift Valley was the best path for the line, followed by the easiest gradient to be found over the Mau Escarpment and down to Lake Victoria. Macdonald and John Wallace Pringle, his second in command, recommended construction of a three-foot six-inch gauge railway. They suggested that Kikuyuland would be a suitable place for whites to live, and their civilizing effect would drive out slavery, but the railway was needed to give access to the new colony. The IBEA Co did not have enough money to undertake construction before handing over the protectorate to the British government in 1895. Construction of the line began in 1895 under the direction of George Whitehouse, a young English engineer.

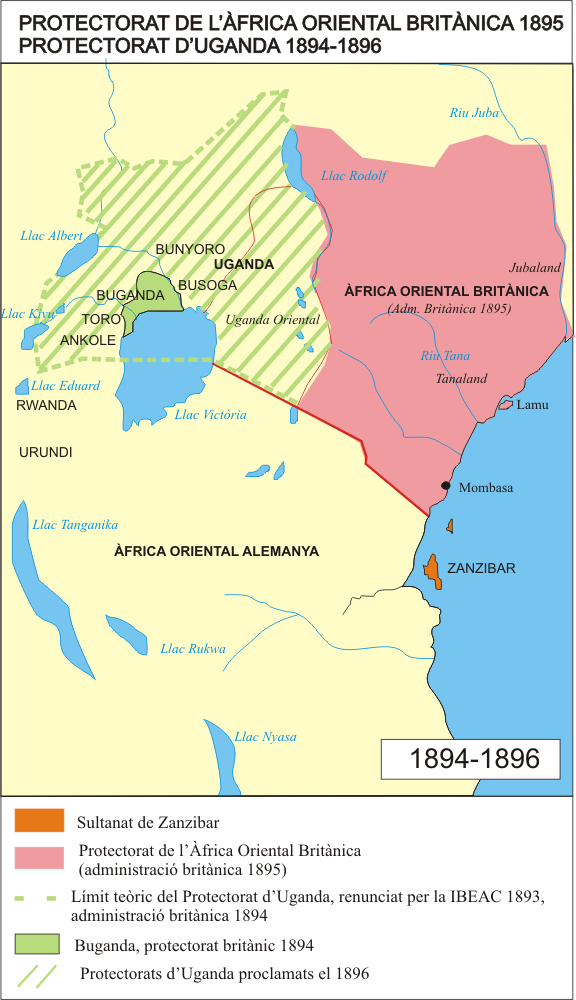
British East Africa 1895–1896. The Nile runs northwest from Lake Victoria to Lake Albert, then north into Sudan

While conducting the survey, Macdonald had been favorably impressed by the intelligent and sophisticated Baganda people living to the north of the lake. In May 1893 Macdonald was appointed Acting British Commissioner of the Uganda Protectorate by General Gerald Herbert Portal with directions to stay away from the internal affairs of Buganda. He accordingly withdrew all the Sudanese troops from the west of the country. In 1894 he was chief Staff Officer of an expedition to the neighboring kingdom of Bunyoro, now in northern Uganda. Later he was posted back to India.

== Nile expedition ==
In 1897 Macdonald was in London when he was appointed leader of another expedition to Uganda, ostensibly to review the northern boundaries. Although Uganda had been declared a British Protectorate the British were concerned that France or Italy would claim some of the unoccupied territory. General Herbert Kitchener was advancing up the Nile towards Khartoum, which he would capture at the Battle of Omdurman on 2 September 1898. However, a French column under Jean-Baptiste Marchand was striking across Africa from Senegal to Fashoda, south of Khartoum on the Nile, and would get there well before Kitchener. Macdonald's instructions were to reach Fashoda first.

The expedition's officers reached Mombasa in July 1897. After moving inland to a base camp at Ngara Nyuki, in September the force was divided into three columns. Captain Herbert H. Austin would lead 300 men north to uncover the source of the Juba River, thought to be connected with Lake Rudolph. The second column, under Macdonald, would go northwest to the Nile and then downstream to Fashoda, arriving there before the French. A third column would supply the first two. However these plans were thrown into disarray when the escort of Nubian troops from Sudan deserted and fled to Lake Victoria.

The Nubian troops had been the Egyptian garrison of Equatoria in the south of Sudan under the leadership of Emin Pasha. In 1885 they were threatened by the forces of Muhammad Ahmad, the self-proclaimed Mahdi whom Kitchener was now preparing to attack, and retreated south to Lake Albert. Emin was "rescued" in 1888 by Henry Morton Stanley. With nowhere else to go, the Nubians had accepted the offer of Captain Frederick Lugard to sign up with the British in 1891, but over the years they had accumulated many grievances. Macdonald spent the next seven months trying to suppress their mutiny, finally handing over responsibility for this task in May 1898 to troops that had been dispatched from India.After the mutiny was put down under the leadership of the Protectorate consul-general George Wilson CB, Macdonald recommended retaining a force of Indians in the country on the basis that the Sudanese troops could be useful, but only if there was an independent body of sepoys.

By the end of May 1898, Macdonald decided he did not have enough people or supplies to reach his original objective of Fashoda. Instead, his column would aim for Lado, further south on the Nile, while Austin's column would pursue its original objective of exploring around Lake Rudolf. On the route to Lado Macdonald's column passed through Lotuko country in what is now the Eastern Equatoria state of South Sudan, where he was given a friendly reception by the Lotuko chief Lomoro Xujang. Macdonald saw a resemblance between the Maasai people and the Lotuko, and for this reason later recommended incorporation of the Lotuko lands into Uganda.

Both of Macdonald's columns managed to return to Mombasa by December 1898, having completed their revised tasks, and the force was disbanded early in 1899. This was one of the last incidents in the Scramble for Africa, in which almost the entire continent was brought under European rule. He was appointed a Companion of the Order of the Bath (CB) in the 1900 New Year Honours list on 1 January 1900 (the order was gazetted on 16 January 1900), and invested by Queen Victoria at Windsor Castle on 1 March 1900.

== Interlude ==
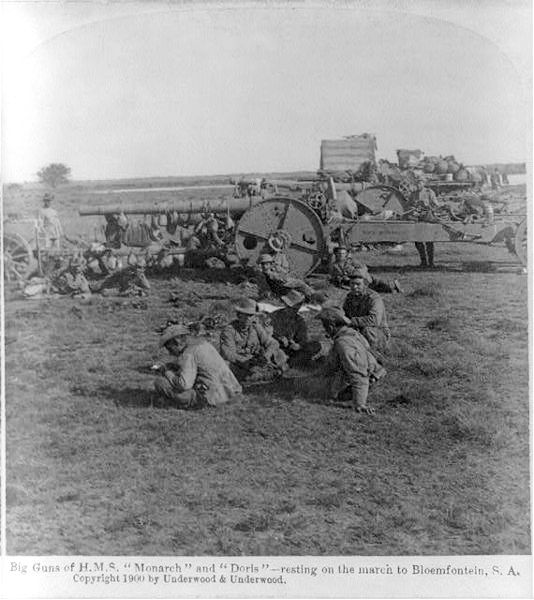
British artillery during Boer War – 4.7 inch field guns

Macdonald had become a fellow of the Royal Geographical Society in 1891, and gave an account of his African Expedition to the society at a meeting in June 1899. He was next posted to South Africa, where he was responsible for introducing most of the new sections of balloon observers, which made a significant contribution to British progress in the Second Boer War. In this war, the British required over 450,000 men to subdue settlers of Dutch origin who were seeking to preserve their independence. The Boer forces never numbered more than 60,000. The war introduced innovations such as the field telephone, searchlights and barbed wire. Creeping artillery barrages supported infantry advances against entrenched opponents armed with rifles and machine guns, a technique later developed to the extreme during the First World War.

Macdonald left in August 1900 to take up the command of the fourth Balloon section with the British imperial troops fighting the Boxer Rebellion in China. He was then appointed Director of Railways for the China expeditionary force. The fighting in China was the result of growing assertiveness by European powers in China over trade, religion and control of territory during the dying days of the Manchu Qing Dynasty, aggravated by poverty due to harvest failures. A widespread popular uprising led to a siege of Europeans in Beijing. The European colonial powers cooperated in military action to suppress the uprising and imposed harsh indemnities and conditions. From China, Macdonald was posted to Mauritius as general officer commanding later in 1900.

== Tibet expedition ==
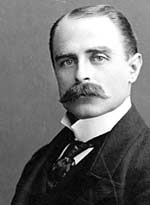
Francis Younghusband

In 1903 the British were suspicious of the intentions of the Russian Empire in the lands bordering India. As a demonstration of strength, the British determined to send a diplomatic and trade mission to Tibet under Colonel Francis Younghusband. Originally peaceful, the project was transformed into an armed invasion when the Tibetans refused to accept the mission. In October 1903 the strength of the mission's escort was brought up to a brigade with about 2,500 British and Indian troops under Macdonald, who had been temporarily promoted from Colonel to Brigadier-General. He was instructed to avoid aggression and act in a strictly defensive role as the mission advanced into Tibet to Gyantse and occupied the Chumbi valley. 10,000 unskilled laborers were attached to the expedition.

The British army left Sikkim on 11 December 1903, and occupied Phari at the northern end of the 60-mile long Chumbi Valley on 22 December. They reached Tuna in mid-January and remained there until the end of March hoping to negotiate with the Tibetans. On 31 March the force advanced, soon coming in contact with a force of about 3,000 Tibetans armed with antique matchlock muskets defending the Guru (or Gura) Pass on the road to Gyantse, about 15,000 feet (4,600 m) above sea level. Macdonald insisted that the Tibetans surrender their arms, a brawl broke out, the British opened fire and the Tibetans were forced to retreat leaving 600–700 dead. The British-led troops had superior discipline and greatly superior weapons including machine guns. The engagement was completely one-sided and the British themselves expressed disgust with the slaughter of their helpless opponents. About 200 Tibetan wounded were carried to makeshift hospitals. Many had been shot in the back.

The advance continued, reaching the original destination of Gyantse on 12 April 1904. Macdonald then took half the force back 150 miles to New Chumbi to check communications and arrangements for supply, earning the nickname "Retiring Mac". There may have been tensions between MacDonald as military leader, backed by Herbert Kitchener, and the younger and more junior Younghusband as political leader, backed by George Curzon. One of the officers in the expedition thought that Macdonald was much more timid than his reputation had led him to expect, perhaps due to illness. Younghusband was so exasperated by Macdonald's cautious approach that he twice threatened to resign. However, caution may have been justified by the extremely challenging terrain and climate, with logistical problems increasing exponentially as the supply chain lengthened. According to one account, 40,000 pounds (18,000 kg) of supplies were needed daily.

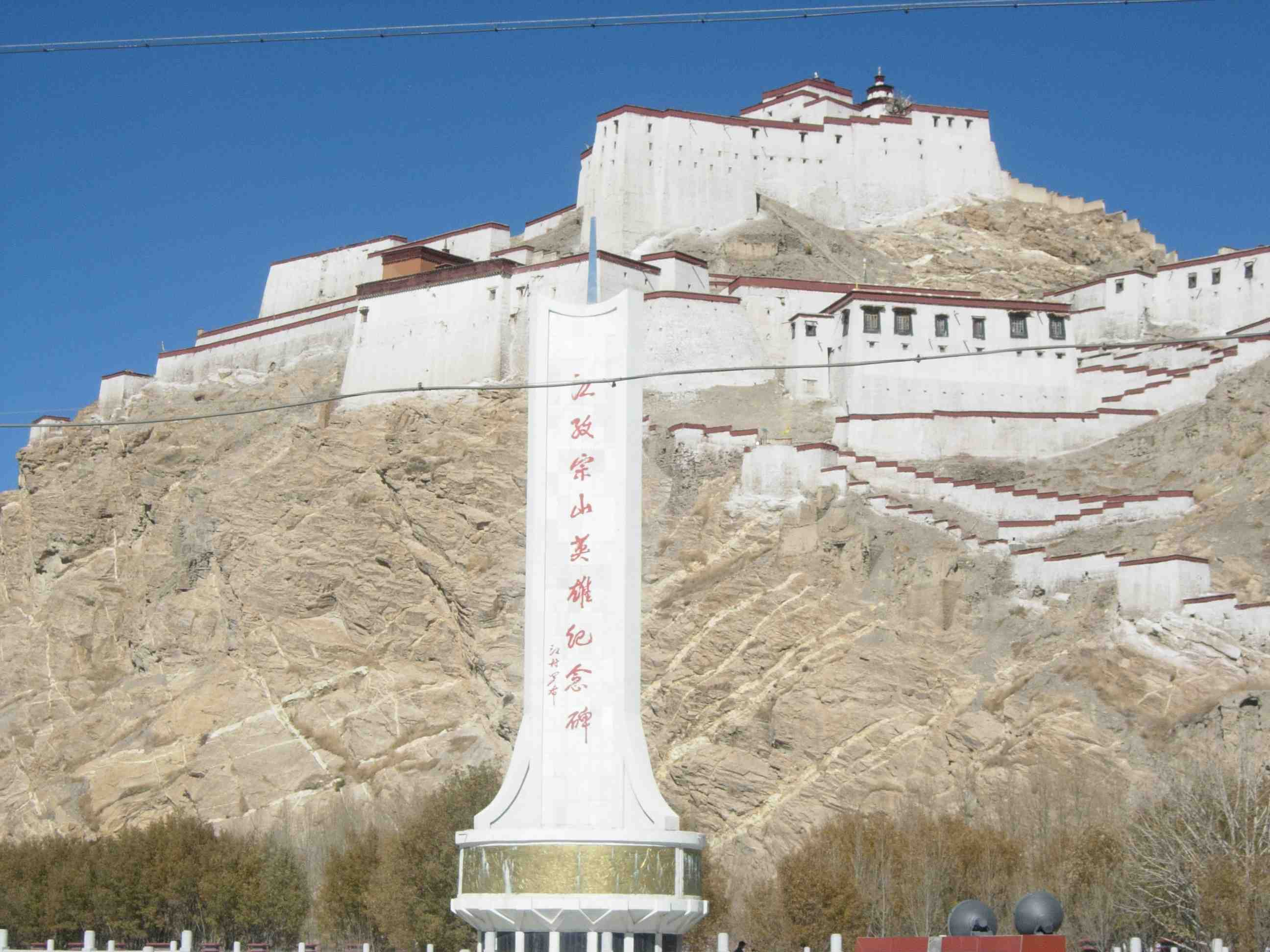
The Gyantse Dzong today

In Macdonald's absence, Younghusband authorized more aggressive action. He achieved some tactical successes, but the situation remained confused. On the grounds of having exceeded his authority, Younghusband was made subordinate to Macdonald, returning to New Chumbi to report to Macdonald on 10 June 1904. The reinforced escort advanced again, reaching the powerful fortress of Gyantse Dzong by 24 June 1904. On 6 July a breach was made in the fortress walls and troops stormed in, forcing the Tibetans to abandon the position. Macdonald had succeeded in his mission of clearing the road, and handed over command to Younghusband for the advance to Lhasa. He received a K.C.I.E. (Knight Commander of the Indian Empire) decoration for his services in Tibet.

== Later life ==
Macdonald, promoted in January 1905 to substantive colonel and temporary brigadier general in order to command a brigade in India, was the general officer commanding in Mauritius from 1900 until he retired from active service in 1912. On 22 July 1908 the University of Aberdeen conferred an honorary decree in the Faculty of Law on Macdonald.

Macdonald, appointed colonel commandant of the Royal Engineers in July 1924, died on 27 June 1927 in Bournemouth, Hampshire, England at the age of 65.

== Bibliography ==
- Macdonald, James (1893). "East central African customs". The Journal of the Anthropological Institute of Great Britain and Ireland. 22: 99–122. doi:10.2307/2842114. JSTOR 2842114.
- Macdonald, James Ronald Leslie (1897). Soldiering and surveying in British East Africa, 1891–1894. Dawsons of Pall Mall. pp. xvi+333.
- MacDonald, James R. L. (1899). "Journeys to the North of Uganda. I." The Geographical Journal. 14 (2): 129–148. Bibcode:1899GeogJ..14..129M. doi:10.2307/1774333. JSTOR 1774333.

== See also ==
- Scramble for Africa
- Fashoda incident
- The Great Game
