= Tsi Nesar =

Former temple in Tibet

Tsi Nesar (rTsis gnas.gsar, also called rTsis lha.khang) is a geomantic ('district controlling' or 'border taming') temple attributed to Emperor Songtsen Gampo who lived in the 7th century CE. However, the original buildings, their precious murals and paintings said to date back to the 12th century, and the nearby temple constructed by Emperor Trisong Detsen in the 8th century to house a famous image of Prajnaparamita, consecrated by Padmasambhava, which survived until the Cultural Revolution, have all been destroyed. A "country-style" temple has been built in recent years incorporating some of the revered ancient timbers from the original temples. It is located in a valley 25 km from Gyantse and 6 km north of Drongtse Monastery.

There were two small ancient temples, the Runo Tsuklakang (Ru-gnon gtsung lag.khang or 'dgon-khang') was built by Songsten Gampo. It consisted of three chapels dedicated to rNam.par snang.mdzad, (Vairocana) mGon.po (Mahākāla) and sPyan.ras.gzigs (Chenresig = Avalokiteshvara). The Yumchen lhakang, apparently founded during the reign of Trisong Detsen, contained a statue of Yumchenmo or Prajnaparamita surrounded by the Buddhas of the Four Directions, as well as an image of mGon.po said to have been made from blood drawn from the nose of Guru Rinpoche (Padmasambhava). The third temple, traditionally attributed to the reign of Emperor Ralpacan (although Vitali dates its foundation to about 1057), was called rGya-phibs, which, from its name, must have been surmounted by a pagoda roof at one time. The "stiff, medallioned robes" dressing the bodhisattvas at Tsi Nesar show Central Asian and Indian (Pala) influences and probably date to the 11th century.

The site is one of the twenty-five main terne, or 'power-places with treasure-troves', of Central Tibet mentioned in the biographies of Padmasambhava. Tsi Nesar is said to contain 'exoteric terma'.
