= Khorzhak Monastery =

Monastery in Khorzhak, Burang, Ngari, Tibet, China

- Tibetan transcription(s); Tibetan: འཁོར་ཞགས་དགོན་པ; Wylie transliteration: ’khor zhags dgon pa Pronunciation in IPA: [[kʰoːtɕak kø̃pa]] Official transcription (China): Korqag; THL: Korchak; Chinese transcription(s); Traditional: 科加寺; Simplified: 科加寺; Pinyin: Kējiā Sì
- Location within Tibetan Autonomous Region

Religion
- Affiliation: Tibetan Buddhism
- Sect: Sakya

Location
- Location: Ngari Prefecture in the Tibet Autonomous Region of China.
- Country: China
- Interactive map of Khorzhak Monastery
- Coordinates: 30°13′0″N 81°16′0″E

Khorzhak Monastery (also written Korchak Monastery) is a Buddhist monastery in Khorzhak (Pinyin: Korqag) town, Burang county, Ngari Prefecture in western Tibet. It is located not far to the southeast of Burang and just northeast of the Indian border. The town and temple are known as Kojanath in Hindi. The village is situated on a beautiful spot at a bend of the Karnali River from where one can see the large red wall of the temple facing the river with a huge inscription on it of the six-syllable mantra, "Om Mani Padme Hum".

Khorzahak monastery is a place where Shyang-Sai lives.

The name Khorzhak is derived from the term for a 'venerable object and its surroundings' (khor) and 'is placed' (zhak). Legend has it that one of four images of standing Chenresig or Avalokiteshvara in the form of Padmapani were brought to Tibet in the 7th century from Nepal by Akarmatishila after he discovered them in a split sandalwood tree trunk. A few old photos of the image suggest it was in Pala style, but it was destroyed by the Chinese and only the lotus base has survived. Another legend says that when the temple was built a silver image of Manjughosa spoke aloud saying it wished to be placed over a fossil, "I have wandered (khor) to this place and here I shall settle (chags)!" The temple is said to have been founded in 996 CE by King Khor-re and Prince Lha-de from Purang, and its original name is said to have been 'Khvachar Lhakang'.

The largest image was a silver one of Jowo Shakyamuni or Maitreya (the coming Buddha) in the form of Manjuvajra In the 13th century statues of Avalokiteshvara and Vajrapani were placed alongside it by King Namgonde and his consort. There used to be a smaller eight-pillared temple beside it said to be founded by the great translator, Rinchen Zangpo.

It was previously one of the most important Kagyu monasteries in Western Tibet. It has inner and outer gates and a large courtyard. On special days in September or early October monks come in from the areas around and perform day-long dances using masks, some of which date from before the Chinese arrival in 1959. Betrothed maidens come out wearing their family's jewellery and fine outfits.

It is situated about 15 km downstream from Tsegu (or 'nine-storied') Gompa and the now-destroyed Simbiling Monastery near Purang, the headquarters of Ngari province, just over the border from Nepal in western Tibet in the valley of the Karnali River which is known in Tibet as the Mapchchu Khambab - the 'Peacock Mouth River' or 'River Formed from the Mouth of a Peacock'.

It escaped the worst ravages of the Cultural Revolution as it had connections with the Kagyupa sect and links with Bhutan and has been completely restored since except for the famous silver statue of Chenresig or Avalokiteshvara has disappeared. It was modelled in the Pala style indicating it dated from the 8th or 9th century CE. It is reported to have been cut into pieces and taken away in 1967.
