= Simbiling Monastery =

Tibetan Buddhist monastery in Purang, Tibet, China

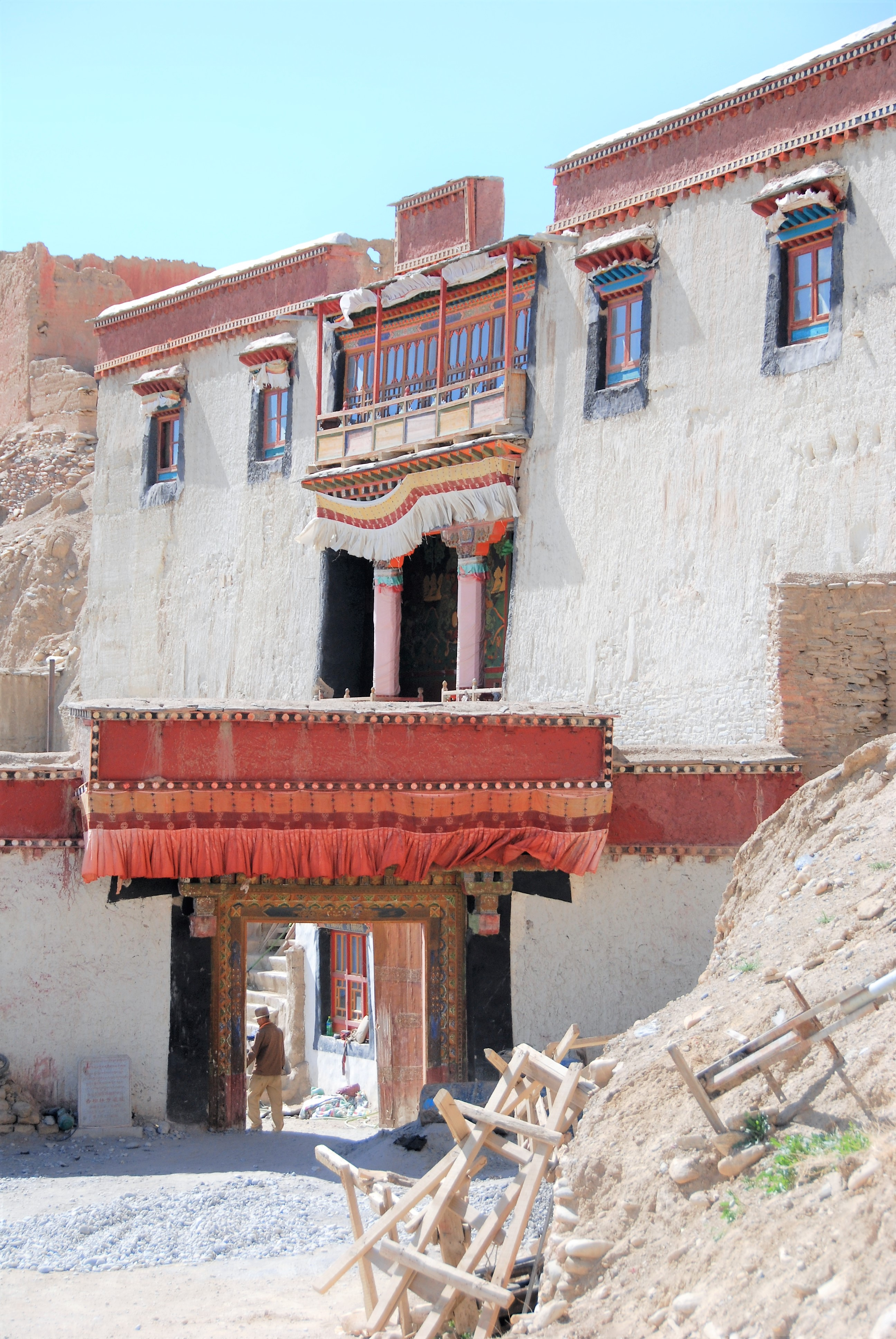

- Location near Purang, in Ngari province

Religion
- Affiliation: Tibetan Buddhism
- Sect: Gelug

Location
- Location: Ngari Prefecture in the Tibet Autonomous Region of China.
- Country: China
- Interactive map of Simbiling Monastery
- Coordinates: 30.304595°N 81.162153°E

Simbiling Monastery, also known as Shambuling Gompa, Shepeling Dzong and Taklakot Gompa, was located next to the large fort of Tegla Kar (Lying Tiger Fort) on a ridge near Taklakot, above the town of Purang, in the Ngari province, which is just over the border from India, in western Tibet in the valley of the Karnali River, which is known in Tibet as the Mapchchu Khambab - the 'Peacock Mouth River' or 'River Formed from the Mouth of a Peacock'.

It was set above a ridge of cave dwellings, high above the town, about 15 km to the east of the Sakya Khorzhak Monastery which has survived, and been restored.

In 1841, General Zorawar Singh, the commander-in-chief of the Dogra forces, after conquering almost all of Ladakh and much of Western Tibet, including Mount Kailash, and lakes Mansarowar and Rakas Tal, and all the territory from Ladakh to the Mayum Pass, east of Mansarowar, from where the road lead temptingly on to Shigatse and Lhasa, backed by a garrison he had stationed at the strategically important Shepeling dzong. He was, however, killed the next year fighting a large Tibetan force, bringing to an end Gulab Singh's dream of an extensive Dogra empire including large sections of Tibet.

Simbiling Monastery had over 100 rooms and was inhabited by several hundred Gelugpa monks. There was also a fort which was the residence of the regional administrator, and a smaller Sakya monastery in the complex. They were all completely flattened by Chinese artillery in 1967. In 2003, work was begun to rebuild Shambuling Monastery by Trugo Lama, Lobsang Samten, and there are now a few monks there.

The present Chinese military garrison and cantonment is just across the Karnali river northeast from the ruined fort and monasteries. The town centre and some ancient ruins are also on this side of the river, which runs right through the town. The route to Mount Kailash heads to the northwest, while the new pilgrim route to India over the Lipu-Lekh Pass, heads southwest, while the route to Khorzhak Monastery and Nepal leaves town heading east.

The temple complex and dzong, or 'fort', were above a temple now belonging to the Gelug sect, called 'Tsegu Gompa' or the "Nine-Story Monastery" which was probably originally a Bon establishment. Tsegu covers many terraces and may be reached by ladders.
