= Vagindra script =

Proposed script for the Buryat-Mongol language

Vagindra script вагиндрын үзэглэл Buryat-Mongol script
- "Mongol" in Vagindra
- Script type: Alphabet
- Creator: Agvan Dorzhiev
- Created: about 1905
- Period: in the status of national writing 1905—1910
- Languages: Buryat-Mongol, Russian

Related scripts
- Parent systems: Proto-Sinaitic alphabet: Phoenician alphabet; Aramaic alphabet; Syriac alphabet; Sogdian alphabet; Old Uyghur alphabet; Mongolian script; Vagindra script вагиндрын үзэглэл
- Sister systems: Tod Mongol script, Manchu script

The Vagindra script (also spelled Vaghintara, Buryat: вагиндрын үзэглэл, romanized: vagindryn üzeglel) is an alphabetic script for the Buryat-Mongol language developed by Agvan Dorzhiev in the first decade of the 20th century. It was used only briefly.

== History ==
Agvan Dorzhiev, or Agvaandorj, a Khory Buryat, developed the script in 1905 with the assistance of Tseveen Jamsrano as a means to cultural unification of the Buryats, naming it "Vagindra" for the Sanskrit version of his name. He based it primarily on the Classical Mongol and Todo script, expressing the hope that it would also help Buryats to read materials in the old script. Approximately ten books and pamphlets were published in the script until 1910, using a hybrid dialect primarily based on stern Buryat, but it was not used after that; there was discussion in 1917 of reviving it for use in native schools, but Classical Mongol was thought more likely to foster Mongol unity. Dorzhiev himself apparently lost interest in the project, and neither mentions it nor uses it in his autobiography. It was opposed by Mikhail Bogdanov, who advocated rapid assimilation through Russian, and it has been suggested that the hybrid language used presented problems for readers, although evidence suggests otherwise. Probably most importantly, the Tsarist government perceived Mongolian unification, and hence the Vagindra script, as a political threat and exiled some of its proponents.

== Description ==
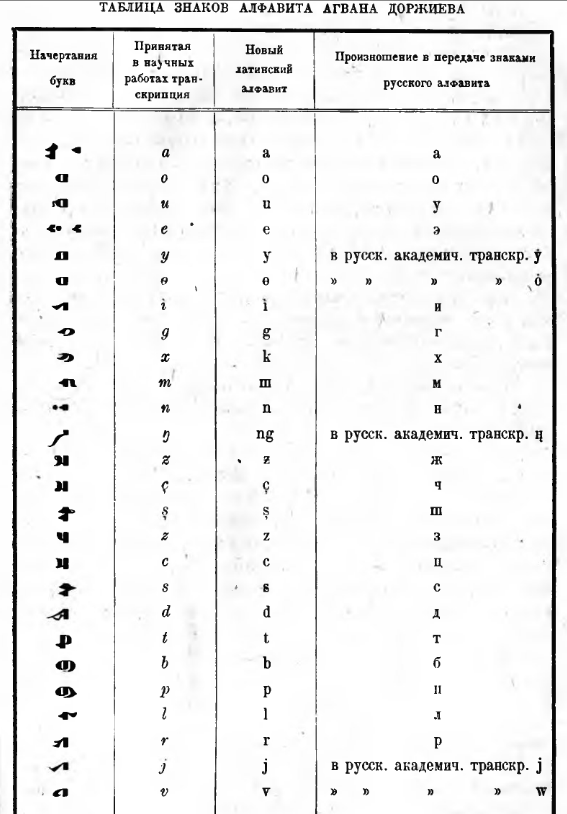
Alphabet of Agvan Dorzhiev

Diacritics of Vagindra

The script is derived primarily from Classical Mongol on the analogy of the Clear script, and like it is written vertically. The version published by Nicolai Amagaev and "Alamzhi-Mergen" (Rinchingiin Elbegdorj) in 1910 consists of 7 vowels and 21 consonants. Diacritics are used to indicate long vowels (a vertical line), palatization (a circle), and letters for use in rendering Russian (a dot), including a letter representing the historical Russian double consonant /ʃt͡ʃ/ (corresponding to Cyrillic Щ). He also added a special letter to mark, Х (h) sound of the Buryat dialect. The alphabet can therefore also be represented as having 36 letters including 8 vowels. Unlike Classical Mongol, the letter forms are invariant regardless of position in the word, being based on the medial forms in Classical Mongol, with the exception of a, which is based on the Uighur script and has a reduced form in medial and final position.
