= Agvan Dorzhiev =

Buryat Tibetan Buddhist monk (1853–1938)

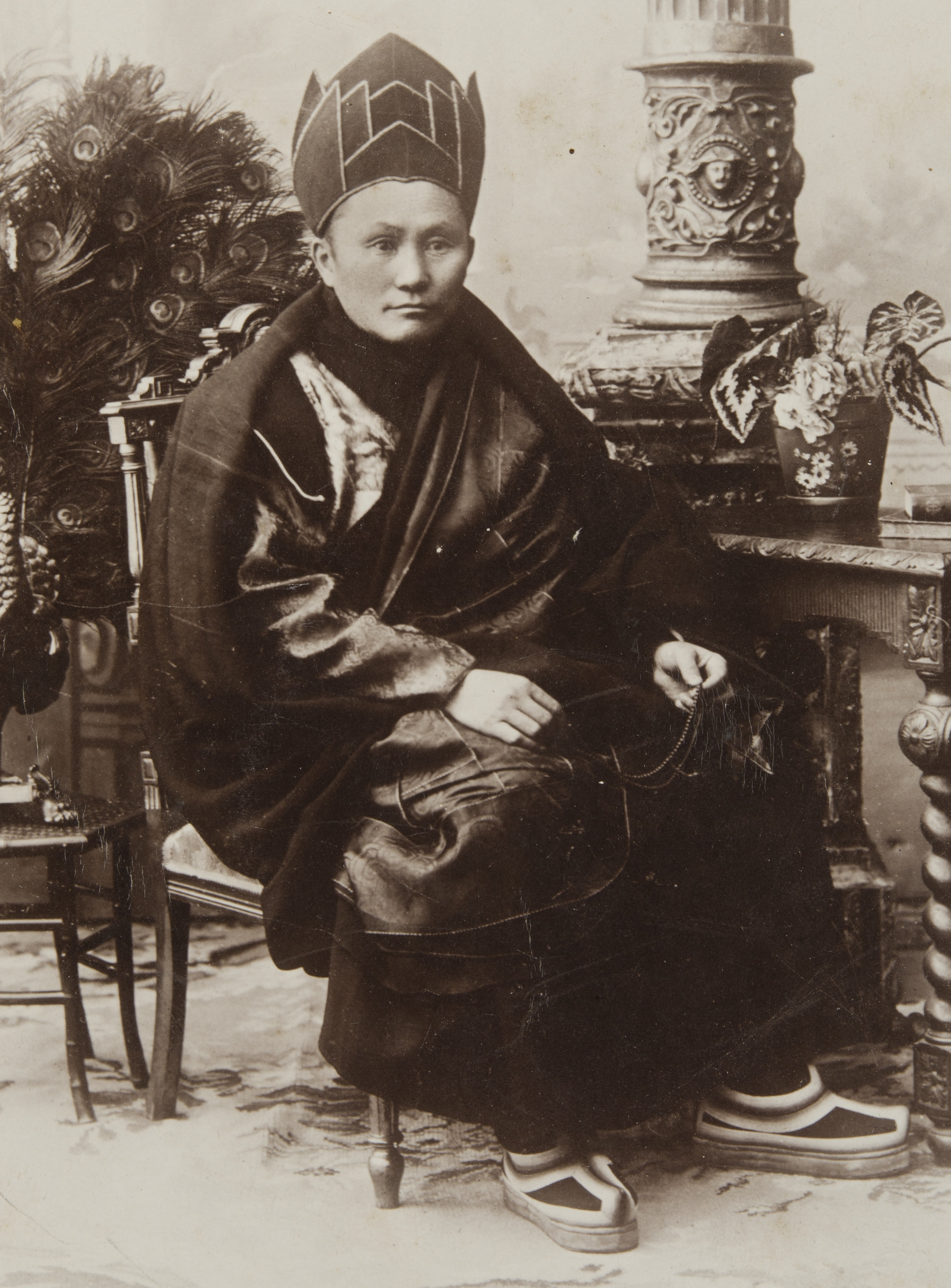
Tsenyi Khempo, Tibetan Buddhist monk, c. 1900

Agvan Lobsan Dorzhiev (Note: Russian: Агван Лобсан Доржиев; Buryat: Доржиин Агбан; Standard Tibetan: ངག་དབང་བློ་བཟང་) (Note: Also Agvan Dorjiev or Dorjieff and Agvaandorj.) (1853 – 29 January 1938) was a Russian-born monk of the Gelug school of Tibetan Buddhism, sometimes referred by his scholarly title as Tsenyi Khempo. He was popularly known as the Sokpo Tsеnshab Ngawang Lobsang (literally Mongolian Tsenshab Ngavang Lobsang) to the Tibetans.

He was a Khory Buryat born in the village of Khara-Shibir, not far from Ulan-Ude, east of Lake Baikal.

He was a study partner and close associate of the 13th Dalai Lama, a minister of his government, and his diplomatic link with the Russian Empire. Among Tibetans he earned a legendary status, while raising the British Empire's significant anxiety of Russian presence in Tibet at the final stage of the Great Game. He is also remembered for building the Buddhist temple of Saint Petersburg in 1909 and signing the Tibet-Mongolia Treaty in 1913.

== Buddhist studies in Tibet ==
He left home in 1873 at nineteen to study at the Gomang College of the Gelugpa Drepung monastic university, near Lhasa, the largest monastery in Tibet. Having successfully completed the traditional course of religious studies, he began the academic Buddhist degree of Geshey Lharampa (the highest level of 'Doctorate of Buddhist Philosophy'). He continued his studies and, in the mid-1880s, after 15 years of study, he attained the title of a Tsanit Khenpo ("Tsanid-Hambo"), which roughly translates as, "Master of Buddhist Philosophy" or "Professor of Buddhist Metaphysics".

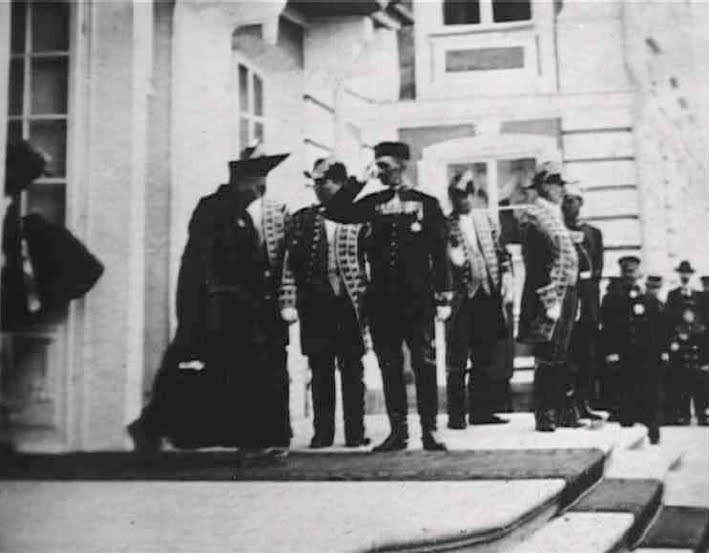
Agvan Dorzhiev coming out of the Great Palace in Peterhof after his audience with the Tsar, June 23, 1901 (Andrey Terentiev Collection)

He became one of the 13th Dalai Lama's teachers, a 'debating partner', and a spiritual adviser, and retained this role until at least the late 1910s. He was probably also instrumental in saving the young Dalai Lama's life from the intrigues at the court in Lhasa, and over the years they developed a very close and lasting relationship.

"One man in particular was to play an important role in building communications between Lhasa and the Russian Czar. This was Tsanzhab Ngawang Lobzang, a Mongolian monk who had graduated with high honors from the Gomang Departments of Drepung Monastery, and who was one of the seven dialectical instructors or Tsanzhabs to the Dalai Lama. Popularly known to the Tibetans as Tsennyi Khenpo, or "Master of Dialectics," he became famed to both the British and the Russians by the simpler name of Dorjieff (from the Tibetan Dorjey). Born in the Buriyat region of the Mongolian territories that had in recent times been acquired by the Czar, Dorjieff was therefore a Russian citizen."

== Envoy for the Dalai Lama ==
In 1896, the Tsar, Nikolai II, gave Agvan Dorzhiev a monogrammed watch for the services he had rendered to Badmayev's Russian agents in Lhasa.

In early 1898 Dorzhiev went to Saint Petersburg "to collect subscriptions for his monastic college" and became friendly with Prince Esper Ukhtomsky, Gentleman of the Bedchamber to the Tsar and orientalist. Dorzhiev was presented to the Tsar. Dorzhiev then went on to Paris and possibly London before returning to Lhasa.

By the 1890s Dorzhiev had begun to spread the story that Russia was the mythical land of Shambhala to the north; that its Czar might be the one to save Buddhism and that the White Tsar was an emanation of White Tara, raising hopes that he would support Tibet and its religion. Dorzhiev had suggested to the Tibetans that Russia seemed to be embracing Buddhist ideas since their recent advances into Mongolia and might prove a useful balance to British intrigues. In the spring of 1900 Dorzhiev returned to Russia with six other representatives from Thubten Gyatso (born February 12, 1876; died December 17, 1933), the 13th Dalai Lama of Tibet. They travelled through India and met the Tsar at the Livadia Palace in Crimea. "When they returned they brought to Lhasa a supply of Russian arms and ammunition as well—paradoxically enough—as a magnificent set of Russian Episcopal robes as a personal present for the Dalai Lama."

In 1901, Thubten Chökyi Nyima, the Ninth Panchen Lama (1883–1937), was visited by Agvan Dorzhiev. Although Dorzhiev only stayed for two days at Tashilhunpo, he received some secret teachings from the Panchen Lama, as well as readings of the Prayer of Shambhala, written by Lobsang Palden Yeshe, the Sixth (or Third) Panchen Lama, concerning the Buddhist kingdom of Shambhala, which were of great importance to Dorzhiev's developing understanding of the Kalachakra ('Wheel of Time') tantric teachings. Choekyi Nyima also gave Dorzhiev gifts including some golden statues.

== British suspicions ==
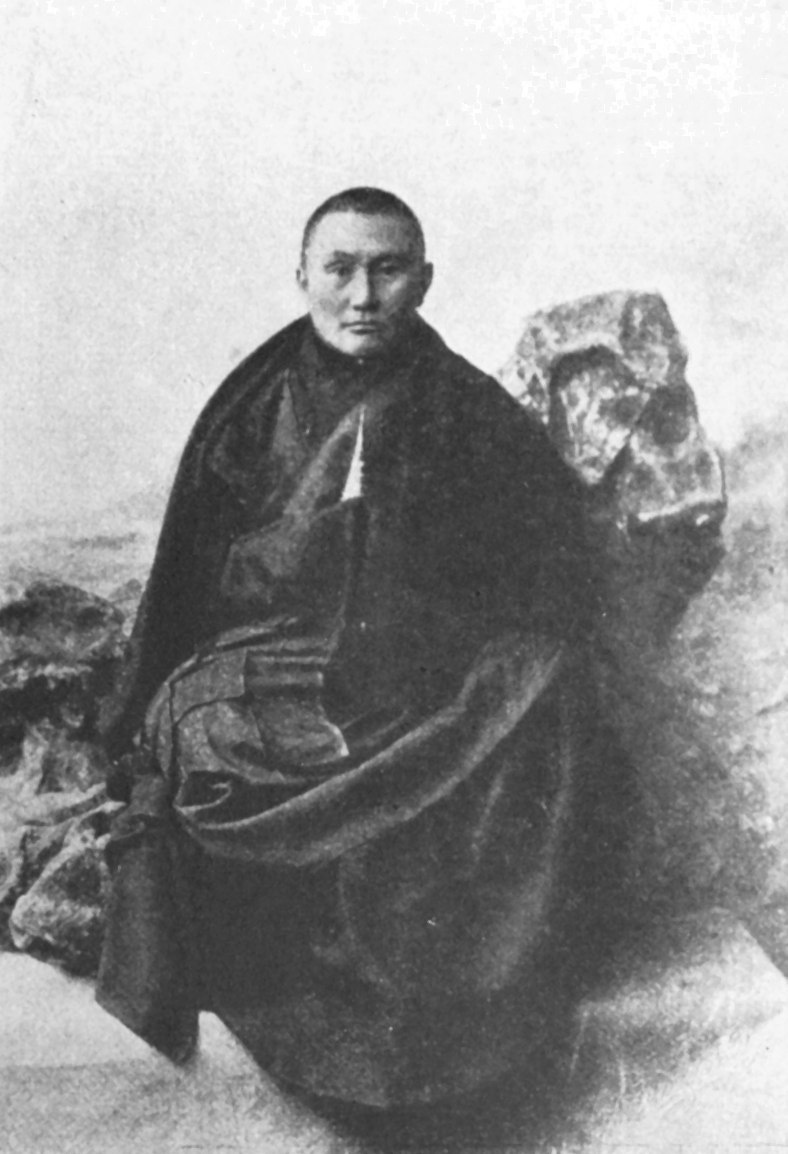
Agvan Dorjiev

By 1903, both Lord Curzon, the Viceroy of India, and Francis Younghusband became wrongly convinced that Russia and Tibet had signed secret treaties threatening the security of British interests in India and they suspected that Dorzhiev was working for the Russian government. Compounded by the closed nature of Tibet at the time, the fear of Russia drawing Tibet into the Great Game to control the routes across Asia was a reason for the British expedition to Tibet during 1903–4.

"Obviously," the [Fourteenth] Dalai Lama said, "the Thirteenth Dalai Lama had a keen desire to establish relations with Russia, and I also think he was a little skeptical toward England at first. Then there was Dorjiev. To the English he was a spy, but in reality he was a good scholar and a sincere Buddhist monk who had great devotion to the Thirteenth Dalai Lama."

In early 1904 Dorzhiev convinced the Dalai Lama to flee to Urga in Mongolia, some 2,500 km north of Lhasa, where the Dalai Lama spent over a year giving teachings to the Mongolians.

During the expedition there were rumours that Dorzhiev was in charge of the arsenal at Lhasa and directing military operations from the Gyantse Dzong (fort). British troops captured several Russian-made Berdan rifles at Nagartse Dzong and breechloaders at Chumik Shenko, which heightened their suspicions of Russian involvement. These were never substantiated and there is no evidence that Dorzhiev was ever a Tsarist spy, although he had previously acted as a roving ambassador for the Dalai Lama in Russia, trying to gain support in the upper levels of Russian society.

During the summer of 1912, he met the 13th Dalai Lama at Phari Dzong and then accompanied him to the Samding Monastery, before returning to Lhasa after his exile in India.

== The 'White Tsars' as incarnations of White Tara ==
Since the days of Catherine the Great (1729–1796), the Romanov rulers had been considered by Russian lamaists as the incarnation of White Tara, a female bodhisattva typically associated with Buddhist tantric practice and considered an emanation of Chenresig (the bodhisattva who embodies the compassion of all Buddhas), and the protectress of the Tibetan people. 1913 saw the great celebrations for the 300th anniversary of the House of Romanov. Dorzhiev made speeches thanking the Tsar for his essential support for the Buddhist community in Saint Petersburg. A lama named Ulyanov published a book that same year attempting to prove that the Romanovs were directly descended from Sucandra, a legendary king of Shambhala.

The Japanese monk Ekai Kawaguchi travelled in Tibet from July 4, 1900, to June 15, 1902. He reported in his Three Years in Tibet that Dorzhiev "circulated a pamphlet in which he argued that the Russian Tsar was about to fulfil the old Buddhist messianic myth of Shambhala by founding a great Buddhist empire." No second source for this story is known.

== Vagindra script ==
Dorzhiev created a script for writing the Buryat language, which he called the Vagindra script after the Sanskrit version of his name.

== Saint Petersburg Tibetan Temple ==
In 1909 Dorzhiev got permission from the Tsar to build a large and substantial Buddhist datsan or temple in Saint Petersburg.

== The Tibet-Mongolia Treaty of 1913 ==
In early 1913, Agvan Dorzhiev and two other Tibetan representatives signed a treaty in Urga, proclaiming mutual recognition and their independence from China. However, Agvan Dorzhiev's authority to sign such a treaty has always been disputed by some authorities. According to Charles Bell, a British diplomat who had maintained a close relationship with the Dalai Lama, the Dalai Lama had told him that he did not authorise Dorzhiev to sign such a treaty with Mongolia.

Some British authors have, based on remarks of a Tibetan diplomat some years later, even disputed the mere existence of the treaty, but scholars of Mongolia generally are very positive it exists. The Mongolian text of the treaty has, for example, been published by the Mongolian Academy of Sciences in 1982. John Snelling says: "Though sometimes doubted, this Tibet-Mongolia Treaty certainly existed. It was signed on 29 December 1912 (OS) [that is, by the Julian Calendar – thus making it 8th January 1913 by the Gregorian Calendar that we use] by Dorzhiev and two Tibetans on behalf of the Dalai Lama, and by two Mongolians for the Jebtsundamba Khutukhtu." He then quotes the full wording of the treaty (in English) from the British Public Records Office: FO [Foreign Office] 371 1609 7144: Sir George Buchanan to Edward Grey, Saint Petersburg, dated February 11, 1913.

Also in 1913, Dorzhiev founded a manba datsan, a medical college, at the monastery of Atsagat. It quickly became an important centre of Tibetan medicine in Buryatia.

== After the Russian revolution ==
After the Russian revolution Dorzhiev was arrested and sentenced to death, only to be reprieved due to the intervention of friends in Saint Petersburg. The temple in the city was plundered and his papers destroyed.

As a means of making peace with the dramatically changed politics, Dorzhiev was quick to propose the conversion of monasteries into collective farms. In 1926 the Buddhist monasteries in Buryatia were 'nationalised': "responsibility for the management of the monasteries" was transferred to collectives of laypeople and the clergy was deprived of its power. This led to much hostility, but the monasteries remained active, and the position of the reformist forces was again strengthened.

Dorzhiev tried advocating for Oirat Mongol areas like Tarbagatai, Ili, and Altai to get added to the Outer Mongolian state by the Soviets. Out of concern that China would be provoked, this proposed addition of the Oirat Dzungaria to the new Outer Mongolian state was rejected by the Soviets.

In August 1927, he led and managed a conference of Tibetan doctors in Atsagat. Proposals were made for a central institute to supervise production and standardisation of Tibetan herbal remedies.

Dorzhiev managed to co-exist with the Communists during the 1920s but was again arrested by the NKVD during Joseph Stalin's Great Purge on November 13, 1937, and charged with treason, preparation for an armed uprising, and spying for the Mongolians and Japanese. He died in police custody, though apparently of cardiac arrest, after being transferred from his cell to the prison hospital on January 29, 1938, aged 85.

He was buried in "a secret traditional burial place in the forest near Chelutai". The location of the cemetery has only been made known in recent years and some estimates say at least 40,000 people were buried there. Dorzhiev was not officially fully rehabilitated, though, until May 14, 1990, when the case was dismissed, 'on grounds of lack of evidence and absence of criminal activity.'

== Proposed Gurdjieff connection ==
Rom Landau wrote a book called God is My Adventure dealing with a number of contemporary religious figures and movements, including the Graeco-Armenian mystic George Gurdjieff. In it, he speculates that Gurdjieff, who is known to have spent time in central Asia, and believed to have been engaged in spying, was Agvan Dorzhiev (under the spelling "Aghwan Dordjieff"). The claim has been criticised by some of Gurdjieff's biographers, such as Paul Beekman Taylor and James Moore, who argues that the two men were of different age and appearance.

== See also ==
- Buddhism in Buryatia
- Buddhism in Russia
