= Buryat nationalism =

Belief that Buryats should constitute a nation

The flag of Buryatia

Buryat nationalism is the belief that the Buryats should constitute a nation. Originating in the late years of the Russian Empire, Buryat nationalism played an important role in the early politics of Buryatia under the Soviet Union and during its dissolution. Buryat nationalism is a "moderate anticolonial" nationalist movement with Pan-Mongolism and support for Tibetan Buddhism as significant aspects.

== History ==
=== Background ===
Russia began conquering what is now Buryatia in the early 17th century as part of its conquest of Siberia. Rich in raw materials and furs, it was regarded by the Russian government as a possible source of income. The Buryats, who had previously been ruled by the Mongol Empire of Genghis Khan and had subjugated several neighbouring tribes, were resistant to Russian subjugation efforts, and launched a campaign of fierce resistance. The drawing of borders between the Russian Empire and the Qing dynasty in 1724 formally separated Buryats from the Mongols, leading to their becoming a distinct group. (Note: Although the difference was not made until the 17th century, Buryats were already distinct from Mongols by the time of the Russian conquest; the Buryat language is not intelligible with Khalkha Mongolian, the standard dialect of the Mongolian language.)

=== Emergence, Russian Revolution and Civil War ===
1900 was a critical year for the emergence of Buryat nationalism. That year, Russian colonial expansion into the region reached a peak. At the same time, a Buryat intelligentsia was beginning to come into being. Buryat protests sparked Russian threats to "demolish Buryat culture", according to Minorities at Risk, and during the Russo-Japanese War Japan expressed support for Pan-Mongolism in an effort to gain Buryats' support.

The Russian Revolution of 1905 gave further strength to the nationalist movement as Emperor Nicholas II signed decrees urging the adoption of the zemstvo in Siberia and establishing religious freedom. The latter decree was especially influential, giving Buryat intellectuals a justification against increased Russian settler-colonialism. In late April 1905, a congress of Buryat intellectuals (including the Buddhist clergy) gathered in the city of Chita to express nationalist demands, including self-government, democratically-elected courts, Buryat-language legal proceedings and Mongolian language classes in schools. Another congress of Buryats in Irkutsk in August of the same year called to recognise the Buryats' right to local lands, to establish free public schooling, and to recognise the Khambo Lama as the leader of Buddhists in Irkutsk Governorate. At this time, Buryat nationalists split into three groups; the conservatives, (Note: Led by Erdeni Vambatsyrenov.) who sought to reestablish the abolished institution of the steppe duma; the progressives, (Note: Led by Gombojab Tsybikov, Bato-Dalai Ochirov and Bazar-Sada Yampilov.) who supported the establishment of zemstvos as a form of self-government; and the Westernisers, (Note: Led by Mikhail Bogdanov.) who supported "Europeanisation", according to researcher Ivan Sablin. The Russian government ignored all the demands of the nationalist intelligentsia (as well as several petitions to the government), aside from a request to allow a representative of the indigenous population of Transbaikal Oblast to the State Duma.

Buryat nationalists occasionally argued in favour of close ties with Russia, believing that Siberia was destined to be a buffer region between Russia and Japan; Rinchingiin Elbegdorj, a Buryat nationalist and Siberian regionalist activist, argued in 1914 that without Russian support independent Siberia would be dominated by China or Japan.

The 1917 Russian Revolution led to a new growth of Buryat nationalism. The Russian Provisional Government lifted previous censorship statutes, and activists such as Bogdanov and Tsyben Zhamtsarano oversaw the establishment of the All-Buryat Congress and the Buryat National Committee (abbreviated Burnatskom) in April 1917. Land reform, Buryat-language education and an autonomous Buryat territory within Russia were among the Congress's top demands. A large number of Buryats at the time supported the Burnatskom, along with left-wing parties such as the Socialist Revolutionaries, the Mensheviks and the Bolsheviks.

During the Russian Civil War, splits emerged in the Buryat nationalist movement, as urban, secular Buryats (Note: Including Mariya Sakhyanova and Mikhey Yerbanov, both of whom would later become Soviet politicians) supported the Bolsheviks while others remained alongside the State of Buryat-Mongolia that formed from the All-Buryat Congress. The Bolsheviks were particularly attractive to nationally-conscious Buryat women, who had few other opportunities for social advancement at the time.

== Soviet period ==
The Buryat-Mongol Autonomous Soviet Socialist Republic was established in 1923. Prior to the Great Purge, Buryat politics were dominated by korenizatsiia and national communism; the government of Mikhey Yerbanov oversaw efforts to eliminate illiteracy, establish Buryat as the spoken and written language, and ensure that local party cadres would primarily be ethnic Buryats. Efforts to teach local Russians Buryat were taken, but were largely rejected by the local population.

The Great Purge devastated Buryatia's political leadership, religious life and borders. The republic was partitioned in 1937, with 40% of its territory being handed over to Irkutsk Oblast and Chita Oblast despite the opposition of the local government. The Buryat communist leadership was killed, as were most Buryat nationalists. Efforts to Russify Buryatia began in the post-World War II period.

=== Perestroika and the Russian Federation ===
A new wave of nationalism in Buryatia began following the beginning of Mikhail Gorbachev's policy of perestroika. From 1986, Buryat scholars began to promote discussion of historical and contemporary local affairs. In March 1988, these intellectuals established the Geser organisation, named after the titular hero of the Epic of King Gesar. The Buryat government, led by ethnic Russian Anatoly Belyakov, was slow to respond to the demands of the nationalist intelligentsia, and in February 1990 several thousand people protested in Ulan-Ude against Belyakov's rule. Two key figures in the protests were Leonid Potapov and Vladimir Saganov; Potapov, while an ethnic Russian, was publicly popular for his close ties to former leader Andrey Modogoyev, while Saganov was believed to be sympathetic to Buryat nationalism. Belyakov was ultimately replaced by Potapov in May 1990.

Buryat nationalist intellectuals from Geser established the Buryat-Mongolian People's Party in November 1990. Led by professor Mikhail Ochirov, it also included several other nationalist intellectuals, such as Vladimir Khamutayev. The BMPP's policies included the restoration of pre-1937 Buryat borders, reinserting "Mongolian" into the region's title, closer ties with Mongolia and China, and the demilitarisation of Buryatia. The last point was especially controversial due to the region's large border, closeness to China and the presence of the Trans-Siberian Railway.

The government of Potapov and Saganov declared Buryatia was a sovereign republic and a Soviet Socialist Republic (rather than an Autonomous Soviet Socialist Republic) in October 1990, amidst the parade of sovereignties. This declaration was ignored by Gorbachev for unclear reasons, either out of fear of nationalist efforts to establish governments or because he was considering a new model of Soviet government.

Following the 1991 dissolution of the Soviet Union, Buryat nationalist parties failed to make a significant impact on politics. More radical groups like the BMPP were unpopular and generally regarded as unproductive in advancing Buryat interests. More moderate groups, such as the Negedel association and the Congress of the Buryat People, remained popular into the 21st century. 1998 protests by the Buddhist clergy against the intended exhibition of an atlas of Tibetan medicine in the United States were, according to Jorunn Brandvoll of the Norwegian Institute of International Affairs, the most significant expression of Buryat nationalism in the 1990s, were disrupted by the authorities, and became a talking point in the 1998 Buryat presidential election.

Following Vladimir Putin's accession to the Russian presidency, and especially after the 2012 Russian presidential election, Buryat nationalism increasingly came under attack. The Ust-Orda and Aga Buryat Autonomous Okrugs were abolished by disputed referendums in 2006 and 2008, respectively, and after Putin's 2012 re-election several Buryat nationalist activists were arrested.

During the Russo-Ukrainian War, and especially after the beginning of the full-scale Russian invasion of Ukraine in 2022, Buryats have disproportionately been conscripted to fight for the Russian military and have died while fighting in Ukraine. Despite this, Buryat nationalism has not seen a resurgence in Buryatia, though Buryats living in exile have established several organisations advocating for independence.

== Aspects ==
Since its origins, Buryat nationalism has followed a "moderate anticolonial nationalist pattern", according to Sablin. Buryat nationalists often resist titles such as "indigenous", arguing that they are instead an Asian nation or part of Mongolia. Buryat nationalists are supporters of Pan-Mongolism, and symbols of the Mongol Empire such as Genghis Khan have been used in nation-building efforts.

Tibetan Buddhism has played a significant role in Buryat nation building since 1989. The recognition of Tsagaan Sar, the Mongolian Lunar New Year, as an official holiday in 1992 was heralded by Buryat intellectuals and Buddhist lamas as a victory for Buryat culture. Buryat nationalists have traditionally held negative views of those who believe in Buryat shamanism. Followers of shamanism often regard the early 20th century as a time of Russian and Buddhist colonial domination over Buryatia, and consider the Mongol Empire to be the Buryats' golden age. This is in contrast to nationalists and Buddhists, who consider the late 19th and early 20th centuries to be a high point of Buryat cultural expression.

== See also ==
- Free Buryatia Foundation
