= Burnatskom =

Political party in Russia (1917–1921)

Central National Committee of the Buryat-Mongols of Eastern Siberia Центральный национальный комитет бурят-монголов Восточной Сибири
- Abbreviation: Burnatskom
- Chairperson: Rinchingiin Elbegdorj (1917); Jamsrangiin Tseveen (1917-1918); Mikhail Bogdanov (1918); Dashi Sampilon (1918-1919)
- Founded: 25 April 1917
- Dissolved: 12 February 1921
- Headquarters: Chita, Buryatia
- Ideology: Buddhist socialism Buryat nationalism Pan-Mongolism

The Central National Committee of the Buryat-Mongols of Eastern Siberia (Russian: Центральный национальный комитет бурят-монголов Восточной Сибири), generally known by its abbreviation Burnatskom (Бурнацком), was an organization of Buryat people in Russia during the Russian Revolution.

Immediately following the February Revolution, Gombojab Tsybikov (chair of Mongol Philology at the Oriental Institute of Vladivostok) travelled to Buryatia and together with Bazar Baradin, Tsyben Zhamtsarano, Mikhail Bogdanov, Elbegdorj Rinchino, Dash Sampilon and others founded the nucleus of Burnatskom in March 1917. The group gathered virtually all Buryat prominent leaders at the time. Burnatskom supported Alexander Kerensky's Provisional Government and promoted national autonomy. On 25 April 1917 the First All-Buryat Congress formalized the foundation of Burnatskom. In April 1917 Burnatskom set up the autonomous State of Buryat-Mongolia. Burnatskom had its headquarters in Chita and a branch in Irkutsk.

The leaders of Burnatskom sympathised with the Socialist-Revolutionary Party and envisioned a socialist state compatible with Buddhism. Burnatskom sought to reform and modernise Buddhist religious practices. The organization promoted a regional parliament, education in the Buryat language, and pan-Mongolism. However the organization also expressed its willingness to cooperate with the Soviet government if Buryat national institutions would remain intact.

In the political strife of 1917, the Burnatskom competed with the Transbaikal Cossack Party for influence over the region. As Buryat leaders were not given prominent positions on the Socialist-Revolutionary list, Burnatskom fielded its own list in the Transbaikal constituency in the 1917 Russian Constituent Assembly election, obtaining 17,083 votes (17.39%). Burnatskom joined the Nationalities Council of the Provisional Siberian Government in Tomsk in December 1917. Burnatskom organized military units, to "defend religion and national welfare", which the White ataman Grigory Mikhaylovich Semyonov used as rear-guard troops. Nevertheless, relations between Burnatskom and Semyonov remained tense.

Burnatskom continued to exist until 1919. After the establishment of Soviet power in Buryatia, Burnatskom came to be branded as "bourgeois nationalists" and "anti-Soviet". In 2017 the National Museum of the Republic of Buryatia organized an exhibition to celebrate the centenary of Burnatskom, highlighting its role as the first expression of Buryat self-governance.
