= Buryat-Mongolian People's Party =

Former political party in Buryatia, Russia

Buryat-Mongolian People's Party Буряад-Монгол Арадай Нам
- Abbreviation: BMNP
- Leader: Mikhail Ochirov
- Founded: 17 November 1990
- Registered: July 1991
- Dissolved: 2001
- Ideology: Buryat nationalism; Pan-Mongolism; Anti-communism
- National affiliation: Democratic Party of Russia
- Regional affiliation: Civic Union of Buryatia

The Buryat-Mongolian People's Party (Buryat: Буряад-Монгол Арадай Нам, romanized: Buryaad-Mongol Aradaj Nam; Russian: Бурят-Монгольская народная партия, romanized: Buryat-Mongolskaya narodnaya partiya; abbreviated BMNP) was a nationalist political party in the Russian republic of Buryatia, active from 1990 to 2001.

== History ==
The Buryat-Mongolian People's Party was founded by professor Mikhail Ochirov at a 17 November 1990 conference, growing out of the non-governmental organisation Gesar. The party was formally registered in July 1991. On 18 September 1991 the party joined the Democratic Party of Russia as part of a political alliance known as the "Civic Union of Buryatia".

During a 1992 visit by Russian president Boris Yeltsin to Buryatia, the BMNP organised a protest against Yeltsin's presence, holding signs reading "We Demand the Reunification of the Buryat-Mongol Lands," and "No Russia in Buryatia — Buryatia Alone." In early 1992, the radical wing of the party, demanding Buryatia's secession from Russia, took control. Ochirov was removed as leader and replaced by Arkady Tsybikov, Vladimir Khamutayev, and Igor Pronkinov.

The BMNP was subject to a campaign of harassment by the Russian government from 1995, leading to a decline in membership. Further causing a decrease in interest was the belief that Mongolia, then suffering from poverty and primarily concerned with its internal affairs, would be uninterested in assisting Buryatia in acquiring independence. The party ceased to be active from 1997.

== Ideology ==
The primary position of the BMNP was a restoration of the republic of Buryatia to its borders prior to a 1937 reduction that had placed many ethnic Buryats outside of Buryatia and the restoration of the name "Buryat-Mongolia", which had been removed by Nikita Khrushchev. The party additionally argued for greater attention towards Buryat culture. It also sought improved relations with Mongols in Mongolia and China, advocating for the demilitarisation of Buryatia as part of their proposals. Such a proposal was controversial; the Soviet Army maintained a large presence along the Trans-Siberian Railway and the southern border, which Buryatia shares with Mongolia.

According to a 1999 paper by the Panorama analytical centre, the BMNP's political programme was as thus:

- Recognition of the unalienable right of the Buryat-Mongol people to self-determination;
- Recognition of legal acts optimising migration processes in the republic;
- Recognition of a multi-mandate system of elections for representative organs at all levels;
- Securing the real functioning of the Buryat language as a state language in all spheres of public life;
- Decentralisation of state power on the basis of ethnicity, development of local self-government, demonopolisation of the economy, culture, and education;
- Recognition of the Baikal region as a World Heritage Site and securing economic activity in Buryatia to meet this status;
- Economic recovery of the republic via development of market relations equalising all forms of ownership, supporting business activities and liberated peasants' labour;
- Development of programmes of social assistance to the republican population;
- Integration of Buryatia's economy with the global economic system;
- Establishment of openness in the placement of military detachments on the territory of Buryatia, fighting for their reduction, creation of demilitarised zones which do not cause harm to the country's defence.

The BMNP also took interest in reforms to the Buryat language, seeking to restore the Mongolian script and the pre-1939 literary standard (which was more closely related to the Khalkha dialect of Mongolian than the post-1939 standard).
