= Free Buryatia Foundation =

American advocacy group

- Фонд Свободная Бурятия; Сүлөөтэ Буряад ороной жаса
- Formation: March 2022
- Founder: Alexandra Garmazhapova, Viktoria Maladaeva
- Legal status: Foundation
- Purpose: Activism
- Headquarters: Alexandria, Virginia, United States
- Region served: Buryatia, Russia
- Official language: Russian, Buryat, English
- President: Alexandra Garmazhapova
- Website: freeburyatia.org

The Free Buryatia Foundation (Russian: Фонд Свободная Бурятия; Buryat: Эрхэ сүлөөтэй Буряад орон) is an advocacy group focused on the Russian federal subject of Buryatia. The foundation is located in Alexandria, Virginia, United States.

== Creation ==
The Foundation was founded in March 2022 in response to the 2022 Russian invasion of Ukraine, by opponents of the war in Buryatia and members of the global Buryat diaspora. Co-founder and journalist Alexandra Garmazhapova stated that the Russian government was "using impoverished Buryats as cannon fodder" and that "the future of Buryatia should be determined by the people of Buryatia in free elections." Another co-founder is Maria Vyushkova, who researches ethnic inequalities in the Russian Armed Forces and the over-representation of ethnic minorities in Russian forces involved in the full-scale invasion of Ukraine.

== Actions ==
The organization has organized legal aid for soldiers and national guard members who are conscientious objectors to the invasion of Ukraine, as well as for their families. According to the Foundation, it has helped at least 350 individuals as of early-July 2022, along with widely disseminating step-by-step guides on conscientious objection via social media. It has also used open-source intelligence to publish estimates of the number of Buryats killed in action in Ukraine, estimating that around 2.8% of Russian deaths as of late-April 2022 were Buryat, one of the highest death tolls among the Russian federal republics.

The Foundation criticized the 2022 Russian mobilisation.

== Repression ==
In March 2023, Russia's Ministry of Justice added the Foundation to the list of "foreign agents".

On 1 September 2023, the fund was designated as an "undesirable organization" in Russia.

== Objectives ==
The Foundation supports greater autonomy for Buryatia, including greater control over monetary and natural resources. It supports the promotion of the Buryat language and of the culture of the Buryats.

== See also ==
- Buryat nationalism
- Viktoria Maladaeva
- Free Yakutia Foundation
