= Mongolian Revolution of 1921 =

Event that led to the founding of the Mongolian People's Republic in 1924

- Part of the Revolutions of 1917–1923 and the Eastern Front of the Russian Civil War
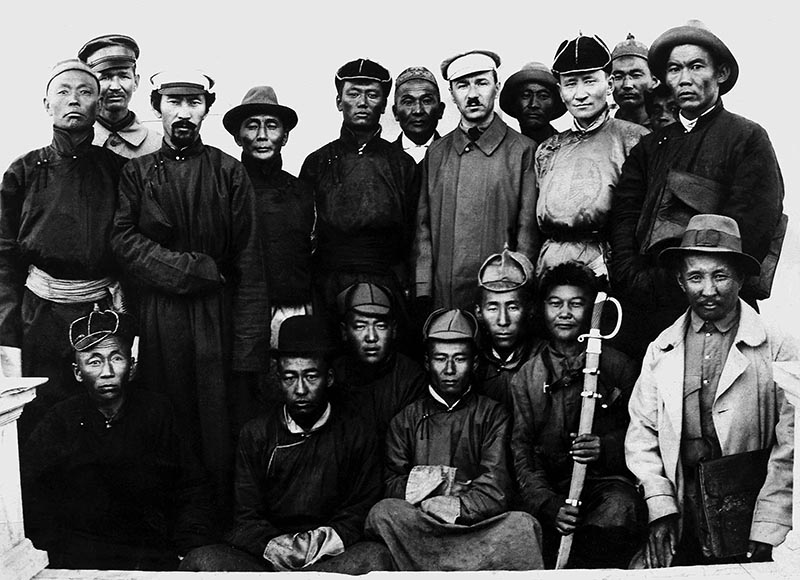
- Back row from left: ?, ?, Rinchingiin Elbegdorj, Soliin Danzan, Damdin Sükhbaatar, Ajvaagiin Danzan, Boris Shumyatsky, ?, Dogsomyn Bodoo
Date	1 March – 11 July 1921 (4 months, 1 week and 3 days)
Location	Mongolia
Result	Mongolian People's Party victory
Territorial changes	Independence of Mongolia

Belligerents
Mongolian People's Party; Supported by: Red Army	Mongolia; Supported by: Russian Whites	China: Anhui clique; Supported by: Japan

Commanders and leaders
D. Sükhbaatar; K. Choibalsan; D. Bodoo; D. Dogsom; D. Losol; S. Danzan; R. Elbegdorj; V. Blyukher	Bogd Khan; Baron Ungern	Duan Qirui; Xu Shuzheng

Casualties and losses
- 1,000 killed (including during the Occupation of Mongolia)

The Mongolian Revolution of 1921, (Note: Also known as the Outer Mongolian Revolution of 1921. Officially known as the People's Revolution of 1921 or simply People's Revolution.) locally known as the People's Revolution of 1921, was a military and political event by which Mongolian revolutionaries, with the assistance of the Soviet Red Army, expelled Russian White Guards from the country, and founded the Mongolian People's Republic in 1924. Although nominally independent, the Mongolian People's Republic was a satellite state of the Soviet Union until the democratic revolution in January 1990. The revolution also ended the Chinese Beiyang government's occupation of Mongolia, which had begun in 1919.

== Prelude ==
=== National Liberation Revolution of 1911 ===
For about three centuries, the Qing dynasty had enforced—albeit with mixed success—a policy of segregating the non-Han peoples on the frontier from the Han people. By the end of the 19th century, however, China faced the prospect of being parcelled out among the Western powers and Japan, each competing for its own sphere of influence in the country. On the northern frontier, the Russian Empire was viewed by the Qing court as posing the greatest threat to its territorial integrity. In response, the Qing government adopted a different policy, the "New Administration" or "New Policies" (Chinese: 清末新政; pinyin: Qīngmò xīnzhèng), which called for the sinification of Mongolia through Han colonisation, the exploitation of Mongolia's natural resources (mining, timber, fishing), military training, and education.

Many Mongols regarded the "New Policies" as a major threat to their traditional way of life, as was agreed to be preserved when they recognised authority of the Qing emperors, and began to seek independence. In July 1911, a group of Khalkha nobles persuaded the Jebtsundamba Khutuktu, the head of Mongolian Buddhism, that Mongolia must declare its independence from the Qing dynasty. They agreed to send a small delegation to Russia to obtain its assistance in this undertaking.

In October 1911, the Xinhai Revolution broke out, with one province after another declaring its independence from the Qing government. On 1 December 1911, Outer Mongolia declared independence, and established a theocracy under the Khutuktu. On 29 December, he was installed as the Bogd Khan (Great Khan, or Emperor) of Mongolia. This ushered in the Bogd Khan era, which lasted from 1911 to 1919.

=== Bogd Khanate ===
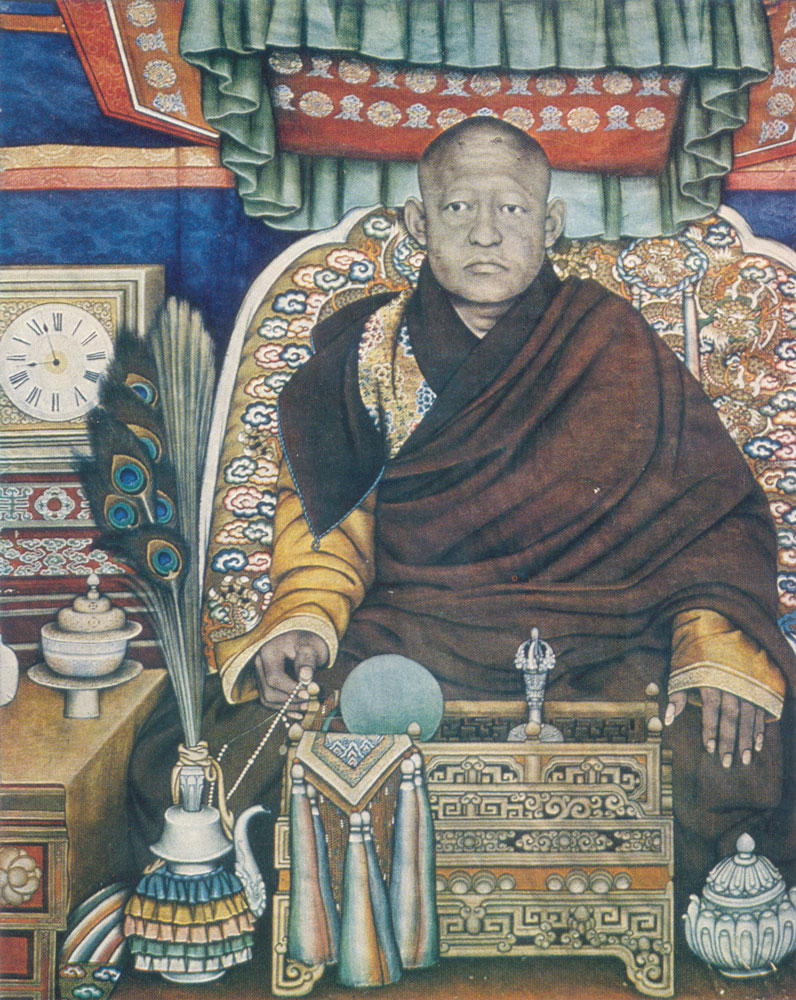
The Bogd Khan

The new Mongolian government was a fusion of Buddhist theocracy, Qing imperial usages, and 20th century Western political practices. The Bogd Khan assumed the same powers—symbolic and real—of Qing emperors in the past. He adopted a reign title, "Elevated by the Many"; the Mongolian nobility now owed their tribute to him instead of to the Qing emperor; and the Bogd Khan assumed the right of conferring upon the lay nobles their ranks and seals of office. This new state also reflected the Mongols' desire to reshape their country into a modern state—they formed a national parliament composed of two chambers, a government with five ministries, and a national army.

The Buddhist religious establishment discovered new opportunities for political gain and financial profit. Despite the presence of a state government, real power lay in the Bogd Khan's court. The religious establishment appropriated revenues for its own purposes. For example, it enlarged its financial holdings by transferring to the religious estate (Ikh shav') wealthy herdsmen who traditionally had owed their services and taxes to lay princes. There is a commonly held misconception that, over time, the greed of the Buddhist religious establishment so disaffected the lay nobility that it came to reject the very principles of theocracy upon which the new country had been founded. According to Mongolian and Russian sources, the Mongolian society was generally satisfied with the theocracy but there were different views on future development of the country.

On the diplomatic front, the Mongols worked tirelessly between 1912 and 1915 to win international recognition of a new pan-Mongolian state that would include Inner Mongolia, Western Mongolia, Upper Mongolia, Barga, and Tannu Uriankhai. The Republic of China, for its part, did all it could to re-establish Chinese sovereignty over the country. Russia refused to support full independence for Mongolia; nor would it agree to the restoration of Chinese sovereignty. The matter was settled in 1915 by the tripartite Treaty of Kyakhta (1915), which provided for Mongolian autonomy within the Chinese state and forbade China from sending troops to Mongolia. Both the Chinese and Mongols found the treaty equally dissatisfying, although for different reasons.

== Abolition of autonomy ==
The outbreak of the Russian Revolution in 1917 and the Russian Civil War a year later changed the Mongolian-Chinese dynamic. In response to rumors of an imminent Bolshevik invasion, the Mongolians, very reluctantly and only after much encouragement by the Chinese High Commissioner Chen Yi at Urga (modern Ulaanbaatar), requested in the summer of 1918 military assistance from China (approximately 200 to 250 troops arrived in September). The invasion in fact did not occur, and so the Bogd Khan's government requested that the troops be recalled. The Beijing government refused, seeing this violation of the Kyakhta Treaty as the first step in restoring Chinese sovereignty over Mongolia.

Early in 1919, Grigori Semyonov, a White Guard general, had assembled a group of Buryats and Inner Mongols in Siberia for the formation of a pan-Mongolian state. The Khalkhas were invited to join, but they refused. Semyonov threatened an invasion to force them to participate. This threat galvanized the lay princes, who now saw a larger opportunity: the end of theocratic rule. In August, the Mongolian Foreign Minister approached Chen Yi with a message from the "representatives of the four aimags" (i.e., the Khalkhas) with a request for military assistance against Semyonov. More importantly, perhaps, it contained a declaration that the Khalkhas were unanimous in their desire to abolish autonomy and restore the previous Qing system.

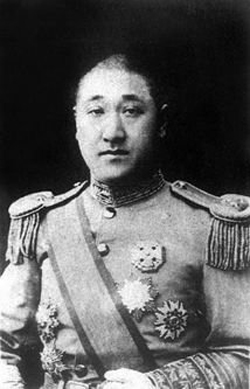
Xu Shuzheng

Negotiations, with participation of the Bogd Khan's representatives, began immediately. By October, Chen Yi and the Mongolian princes had agreed upon a set of conditions, the "Sixty-four Points", effectively recreating the political and administrative system. The "Points" were submitted to the Parliament. The upper house consented to it; the lower house did not. However, in this as in all other matters submitted to the Parliament in the past, the upper house prevailed. Chen Yi sent the draft Articles to Beijing. The Bogd Khan dispatched a delegation of lamas to Beijing with a letter stating that the people of Mongolia did not want to abolish autonomy. He wrote that this was all a contrivance of Chen Yi, and he asked that Chen be recalled. However, the Chinese government was not interested in esoteric arguments on whether or not a consensus existed in Mongolia for the abolition of autonomy. The "Points" were submitted to the Chinese National Assembly, which approved them on October 28.

Political events then unfolding in China were to fundamentally alter Mongolian history. The Beijing government was controlled by a group of warlords nicknamed the "Anhui clique" headed by Duan Qirui. The government had come under severe public criticism for its failure at the Paris Peace Conference to obtain a just settlement of the Shandong Problem. There was criticism also of Duan's "War-participation army", which ostensibly had been formed for service in Europe in the First World War but in fact was used to maintain Duan's internal control. To divert criticism, he simply rechristened his office the "Bureau of Frontier Defense" and his army the "Frontier Defense Army". In June 1919, Xu Shuzheng, a prominent member of Duan's clique, was named "Northwest Frontier Commissioner", making him the senior Chinese military and civilian officer of Outer Mongolia.

Earlier, in April, Xu had submitted a plan to the Beijing government for the total social and economic reconstruction of Mongolia, proposing, among other things, that Chinese colonisation and intermarriage between Chinese and Mongolians be encouraged in order to "transform the customs of the Mongols". In short, Xu appeared to want nothing less than the total sinification of Mongolia under his authority.

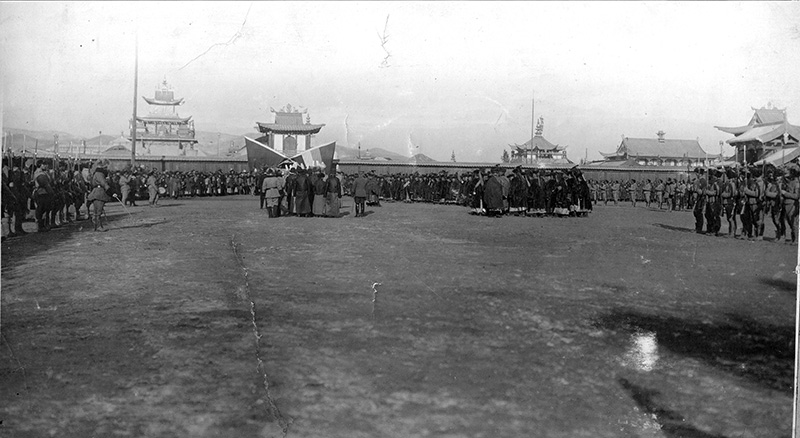
Ceremony marking the abolition of Mongolian autonomy 1920

Chen Yi's Sixty-four Points, which guaranteed Mongolia a kind of autonomy, would have compelled Xu to abandon his plans. This may explain the timing of his personal intervention. Xu arrived in Urga in October accompanied by a military contingent. He informed Chen that the Sixty-four Points would have to be renegotiated based upon a new set of proposals, his "Eight Articles", which called for an increase in population (presumably through Chinese colonisation) and economic development. Xu presented the Articles to the Bogd Khan with a threat that refusal to ratify them would result in his deportation. The Bogd Khan submitted the Articles to the Mongolian Parliament. As before, the upper house accepted them, while the lower house did not; some members of the lower house even threatened to expel Xu by force. Lamas resisted Xu's plans most of all. But again, the upper house prevailed. On 17 November 1919, Xu accepted a petition—signed by the ministers and deputy ministers but not by the Bogd Khan himself—for the abolition of autonomy.

Xu returned to Beijing, where he received a hero's welcome arranged by the Anhui clique. By December, he was back in Urga to organise a formal ceremony for the transfer of authority: soldiers were lined up on either side of the road to the Bogd Khan's palace; the portrait of the President of China was borne on a palanquin; the flag of the Chinese republic followed, and after it a marching band. Mongols were required to prostrate themselves repeatedly before these symbols of Chinese sovereignty. That night, some Mongolian herdsmen and lamas gathered outside the palace and tore down the flags of the Chinese Republic hanging from the gate.

== Resistance ==
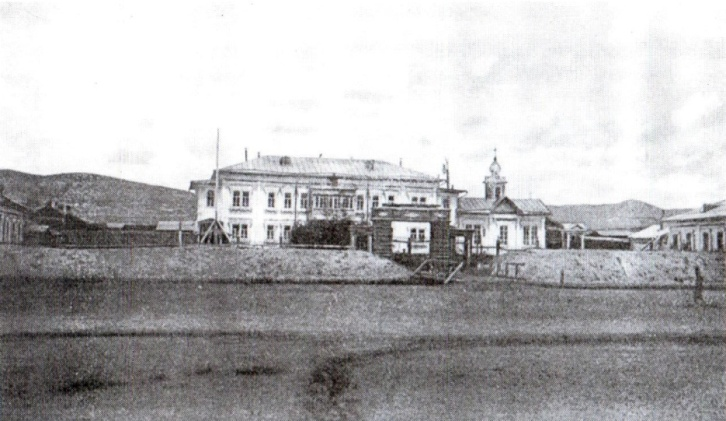
The Russian Consulate in Niislel Hüree where Bodoo taught and headed the Consular Hill group

Between 1919 and early 1920 a few Mongolians came to form what were known later as the "Consular Hill" (Konsulyn denj) and East Urga (Züün khüree) groups. This was the beginning of resistance to Xu and the abolition of autonomy.

The first group owed its existence principally to Dogsomyn Bodoo (1885–1922), a highly educated, 35-year-old lama who worked in the Russian Consulate at Urga during the Bogd Khan era. Sharing a yurt with Bodoo was Khorloogiin Choibalsan (1895–1953), later to be known as the "Stalin of Mongolia". A certain Mikhail Kucherenko, a typesetter in the Russo-Mongolian printing office and a member of the Bolshevik underground in Urga, occasionally visited Bodoo and Choibalsan; conversations, no doubt, turned on the Russian revolution and the political situation in Mongolia. In time, other Mongolians joined Bodoo and Choibalsan in discussions over the abolition of autonomy and the failure of Mongolian princes and senior lamas to put up an effective resistance to the Chinese.

The leaders of the East Urga group were Soliin Danzan (1885–1924), an official in the Ministry of Finance, and Dansranbilegiin Dogsom (1884–1939), an official in the Ministry of the Army. Another, albeit less prominent at the time, member was Damdin Sükhbaatar (1893–1923), a soldier in the Mongolian army who, after his death, was canonised by Communist historians as the "Lenin of Mongolia". The beginning of the East Urga group may be traced to mid-November 1919, when several of the more militant members of the lower house of the Mongolian Parliament, including Danzan and Dogson, met secretly on the first night following its dissolution by Xu Shuzheng, and resolved to resist the Chinese. Twice they approached the Bogd Khan to obtain his support for armed resistance; twice the Khan counselled patience. The group plotted to seize the Mongolian army's arsenal and assassinate Xu Shuzheng; however, the placement of Chinese guards at the arsenal and a revised travel itinerary for Xu thwarted both plans.

== Formation of the Mongolian People's Party ==
Mongolian Revolutionaries

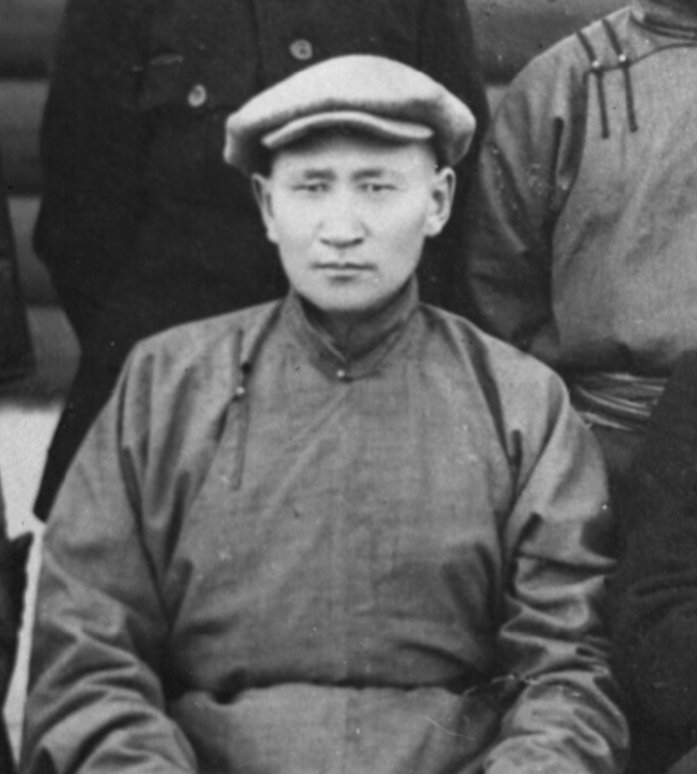
Dogsomyn Bodoo

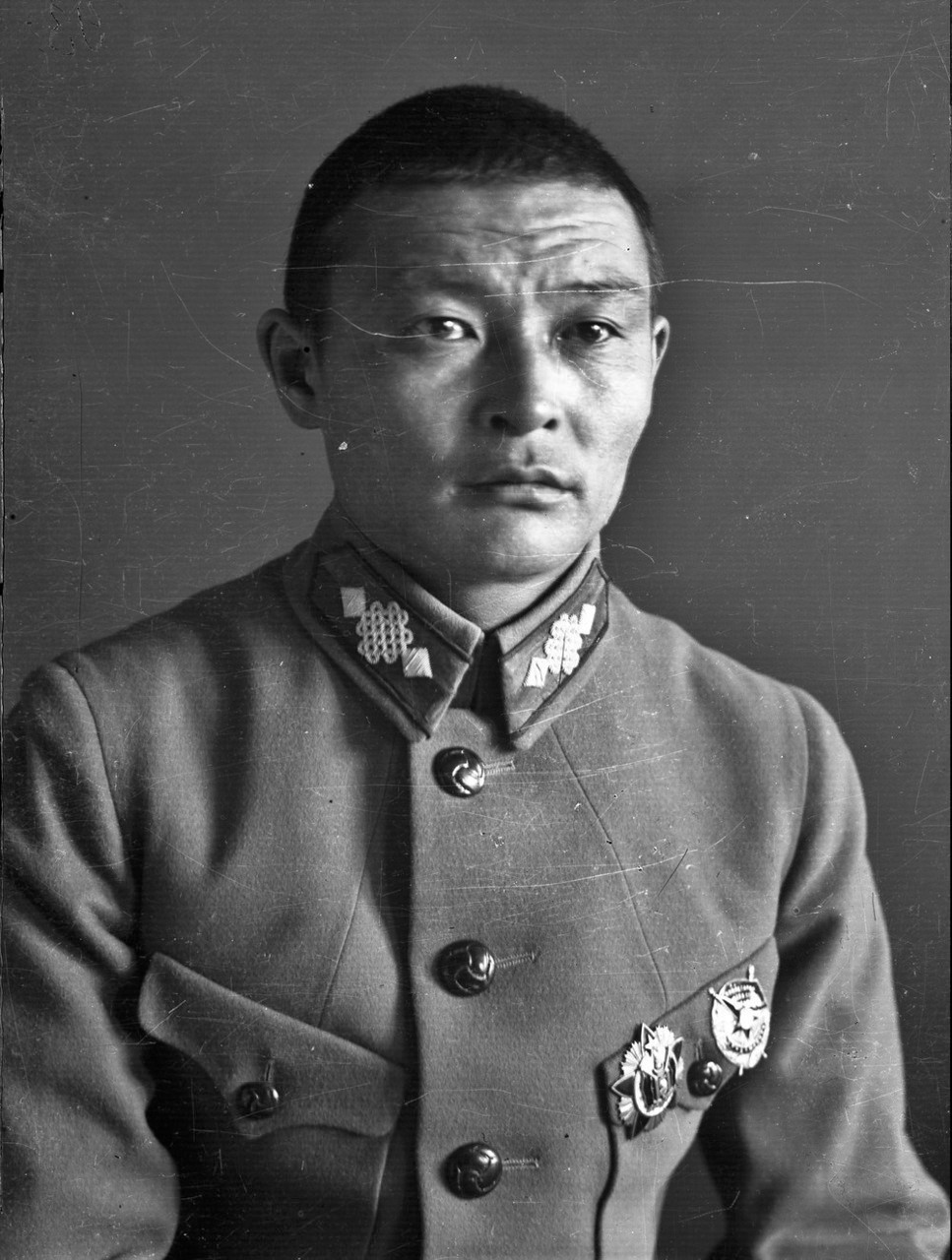
Khorloogiin Choibalsan

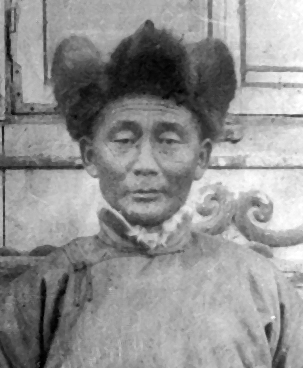
Soliin Danzan

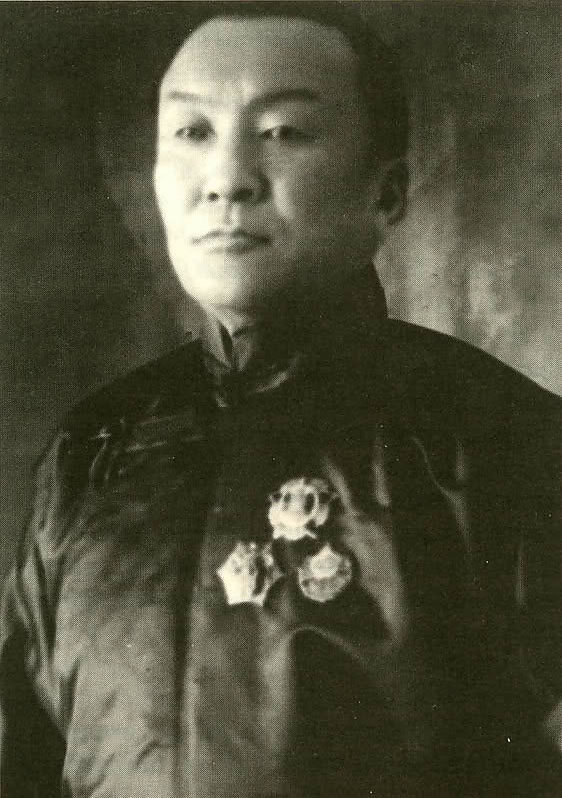
Dansranbilegiin Dogsom

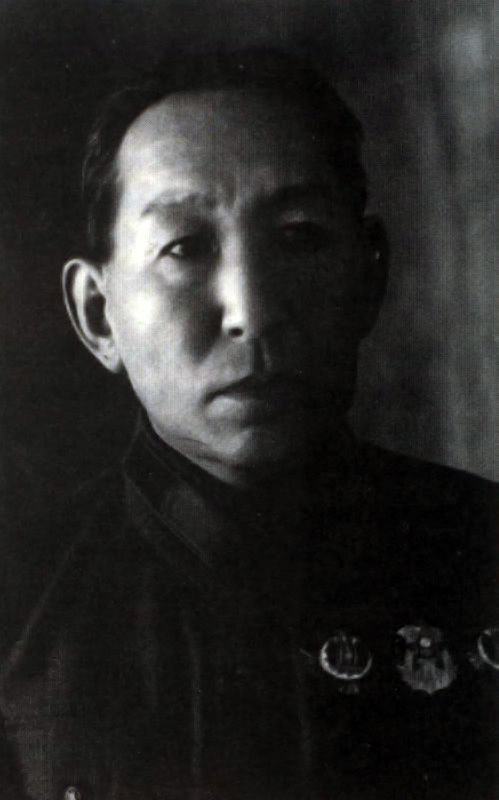
Darizavyn Losol

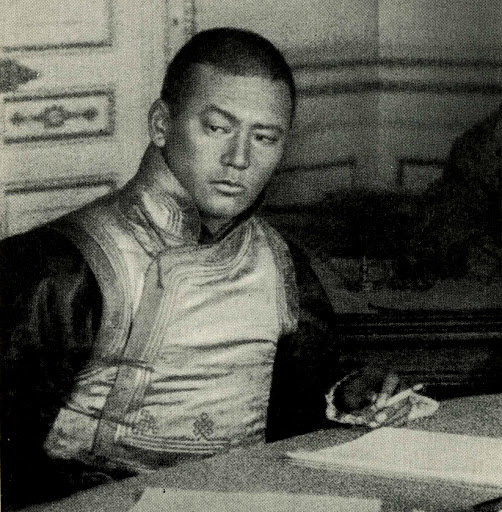
Damdin Sükhbaatar

Russian expatriates in Urga had elected a revolutionary "Municipal Duma", headed by Bolshevik sympathisers, which had learned of the Consular Hill group. In early March 1920, the Duma was sending one of its members, I. Sorokovikov, to Irkutsk. It decided that he should also take a report with him about these Mongolians. Sorokovikov met with representatives of the two groups. On his return to Urga in June, he met with them again, promising that the Soviet government would provide "assistance of all kinds" to the Mongolian "workers". He invited them to send representatives to Russia for further discussions.

A new sense of purposefulness now animated both groups. They had maintained a wary distance from one another, perhaps because of their different agendas—the Consular Hill group espousing a rather progressive social program while the East Urga group was more nationalistic in its goals—and there had been little cooperation between the two. The Soviet invitation changed that. The two groups met on 25 June, and formed the "Mongolian People's Party" (renamed later the Mongolian People's Revolutionary Party), adopted a "Party Oath", and agreed to send Danzan and Choibalsan as delegates to Russia.

Danzan and Choibalsan arrived in Verkhneudinsk, the capital of the pro-Soviet Far Eastern Republic, in the first part of July. They met with Boris Shumyatsky, then acting head of the government. Shumyatsky knew little about them, and for three weeks dodged their demands for a speedy Soviet decision whether or not to provide military assistance to the Mongolians against the Chinese. Finally, perhaps at Shumyatsky's suggestion, they sent a telegram to members of the MPP in Urga with a coded message that they should obtain a letter, stamped with the seal of the Bogd Khan, formally requesting Soviet assistance. The MPP did succeed in obtaining a letter from the Khan's court, albeit with difficulty. Five members of the Party—D. Losol, Dambyn Chagdarjav, Dogsom, L. Dendev, and Sükhbaatar—brought it to Verkhneudinsk. When the seven men met with Shumyatsky, he told them that he had no authority to make a decision on their request; they must go to Irkutsk.

On arriving in Irkutsk in August, the Mongolians met with the head of what was later to be reorganised as the Far Eastern Secretariat of the Communist International (Comintern), and explained that they needed military instructors, 10,000 rifles, cannon, machine guns, and money. They were told that they must draft a new letter, this time in the name of the Party, not the Bogd Khan, stating their objectives and requests. Such a petition would have to be considered by the Siberian Revolutionary Committee in Omsk.

The Mongolians divided themselves into three groups: Danzan, Losol, and Dendev left for Omsk; Bodoo and Dogsom returned to Urga, where they were to enlarge the party's membership and form an army; Sükhbaatar and Choibalsan proceeded to Irkutsk to serve as a communication link between the others. Before separating, the group drafted a new appeal with a more revolutionary message: The Mongolian nobility would be divested of its hereditary power, to be replaced by a democratic government headed by the Bogd Khaan as a limited monarch. The document also contained a request for immediate military assistance.

== Ungern-Sternberg ==
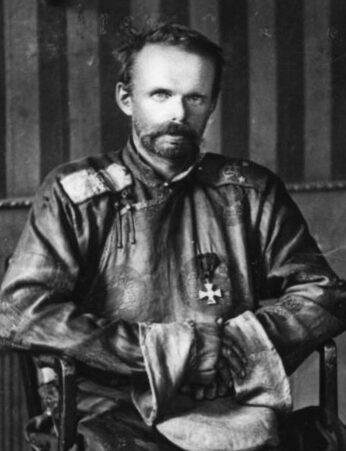
Roman von Ungern-Sternberg

After several meetings with Soviet authorities in Omsk, the Mongolian delegation was told that such an important matter could be decided only in Moscow. Danzan and his compatriots left for Moscow, arriving in about mid-September. For over a month they met frequently but inconclusively with Soviet and Comintern officials.

A White Guard invasion of Mongolia under Baron Roman von Ungern-Sternberg, however, forced the Soviet government into action. In late October to early November 1920, around 1,000 troops under his command had laid siege to the Chinese garrison in Urga numbered about 7,000. On 10 or 11 November, the three Mongols were hurriedly summoned to a meeting with Soviet authorities. They were told that the Party would be supplied with all the weapons it needed, but they must quickly return to Mongolia, and there increase the Party's membership and raise an army. At the same time, Moscow ordered the Soviet Fifth Red Army to cross the Mongolian border and destroy von Ungern-Sternberg's army.

The Chinese garrison in Urga, however, successfully repulsed von Ungern-Sternberg's attack. This altered the Soviet strategy. The army of the Far Eastern Republic was already exhausted. Only the Fifth Army of the Reds was left on the eastern front, and already by late 1920 many of its more experienced units had either been demobilized, or sent west to fight in Poland, or assigned to the labor front, where they were needed to repair the badly damaged Siberian economy. Thus, when the Chinese repulsed von Ungern-Sternberg, the Soviets on 28 November withdrew their order for an invasion.

However, von Ungern-Sternberg launched a second attack in early February 1921. This time he was successful. Chinese soldiers and civilians fled the city in panic. With the fall of Urga, the Chinese administrations and military garrisons at Uliastai and Khovd departed quickly for Xinjiang. The Bogd Khan was restored as Mongolian monarch by von Ungern-Sternberg. The Bogd Khan and his government were also restored, and a solemn ceremony held on 22 February.

== Growth of the Mongolian People's Party ==
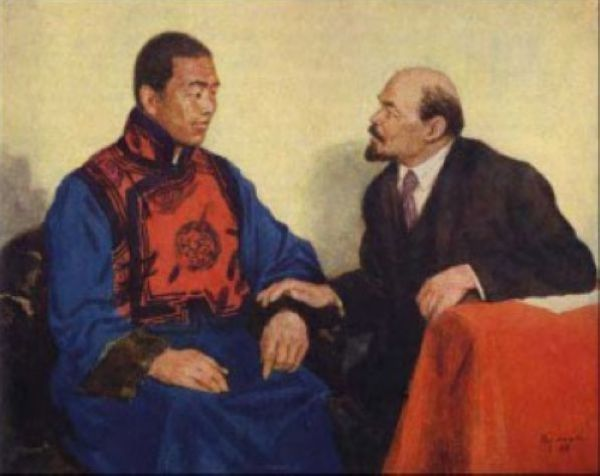
Sükhbaatar meets with Lenin, a poster of Bolsheviks

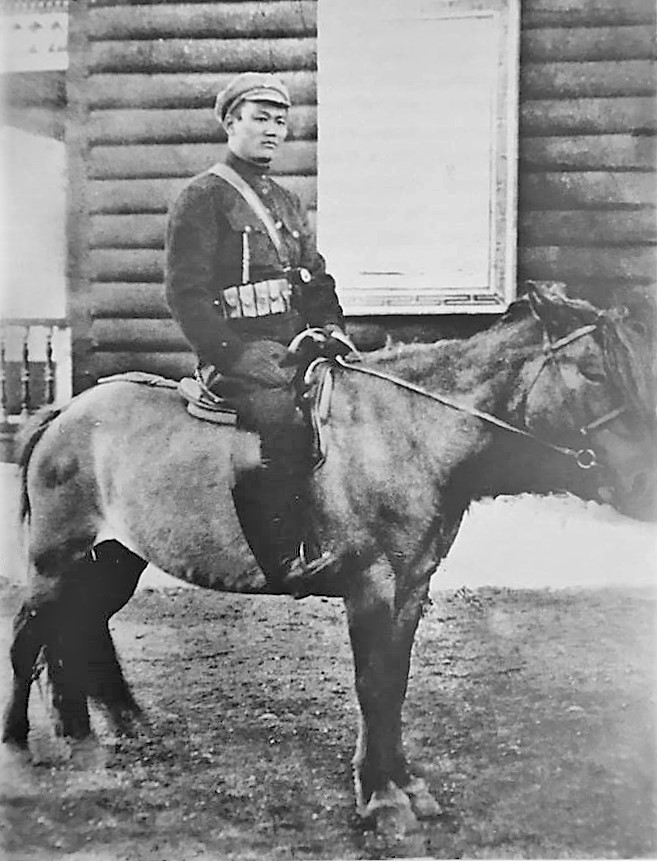
Damdin Sükhbaatar in Troitskosavsk

News of von Ungern-Sternberg's seizure of Urga again influenced Soviet plans. A plenary session of the Comintern in Irkutsk on February 10 passed a formal resolution to aid the "struggle of the Mongolian people for liberation and independence with money, guns and military instructors". With Soviet support, the MPP was now a serious contender for power. The Party, hitherto rather amorphous and loosely connected, required better organisational and ideological definition. A party conference (subsequently regarded as the first congress of the Mongolian People's Revolutionary Party) met secretly on 1–3 March at Kyakhta. The first session was attended by 17 persons, the second by 26. The Party approved the creation of an army command staff headed by Sükhbaatar with two Russian advisors, elected a central committee chaired by Danzan with one representative from the Comintern, and adopted a party manifesto composed by the progressive Buryat Jamsrangiin Tseveen. On 13 March, a provisional government of seven men was formed, soon to be headed by Bodoo. On 18 March, the Mongolian guerrilla army, its ranks now enlarged to 400 through recruitment and conscription, seized the Chinese garrison at Kyakhta Maimaicheng (the Chinese portion of Kyakhta). A new confidence now animated the Party. It issued a proclamation announcing the formation of the government, the expulsion of the Chinese, and the promise to convene a congress of "representatives of the masses" to elect a permanent government. A propaganda war of sorts between the provisional government and the Bogd Khaan's court followed: the Party saturated the northern border with leaflets urging people to take up arms against the White Guards; the legal government of the Bogd Khaan government barraged the same area with warnings that these revolutionaries were intent upon destroying the Mongolian state and shattering the very foundations of the Buddhist faith.

The new Soviet government was anxious to establish diplomatic relations with China. It had sent a representative to Beijing; the Chinese government reciprocated with its own to Moscow. Perhaps the principal reason that the Soviets had hesitated to aid the Mongolians too openly was fear of prejudicing those negotiations. But by early 1921 whatever restraints there were upon open Soviet support for Mongolia had ended: China suspended talks with the Soviet government in January 1921; the Chinese government appeared to be incapable of dealing with von Ungern-Sternberg; and in early March it had refused Soviet military assistance against the White Guards. It was then that the Russians became firmly committed to the Mongolian revolution.

The material expression of this commitment was an increase in the flow of Soviet advisers and weapons in March to the MPP. In March and April, Soviet and Far Eastern Republican units were transferred to Kyakhta, while the Mongols doubled the number of their guerrillas to 800. Von Ungern-Sternberg's forces attacked Kyakhta in early June. He encountered a body of Red Army troops army several times larger than his own, and the White Guards were thrown back with heavy losses. On 28 June, the main Soviet expeditionary corps crossed the border into Mongolia, and on 6 July, the first Mongolian and Russian units entered Urga.

The Mongolian revolutionaries went to work immediately. On 9 July, they sent a letter to the Bogd Khaan's court, announcing that power was now in the hands of the people: "The disorder which reigns presently is as much due to the shortcomings of the [hereditary] leaders as to the fact that the existing laws and situation do not correspond any longer to the spirit of the times. Everything, therefore, except religion, will be subject to gradual change". The following day, the Party's Central Committee issued a resolution declaring the formation of a new government headed by Bodoo, with the Jebtsundamba Khutuktu as a limited monarch. On 11 July, he was ceremonially installed on the throne of Mongolia.

== Aftermath ==
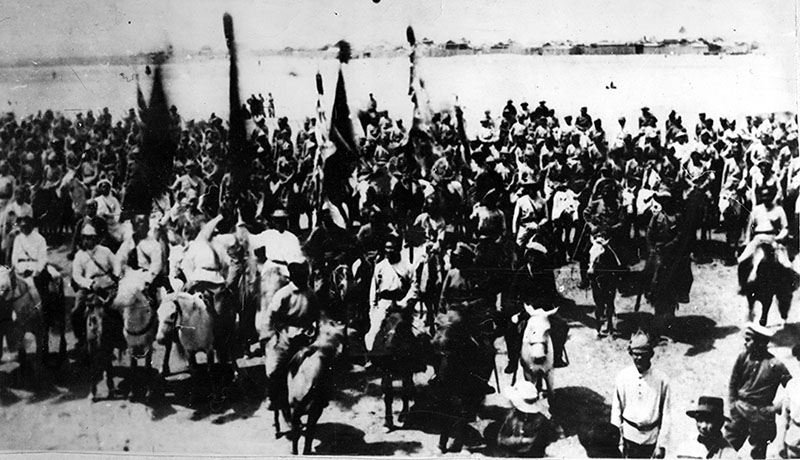
Soviet and Mongol cavalry occupied Urga in August

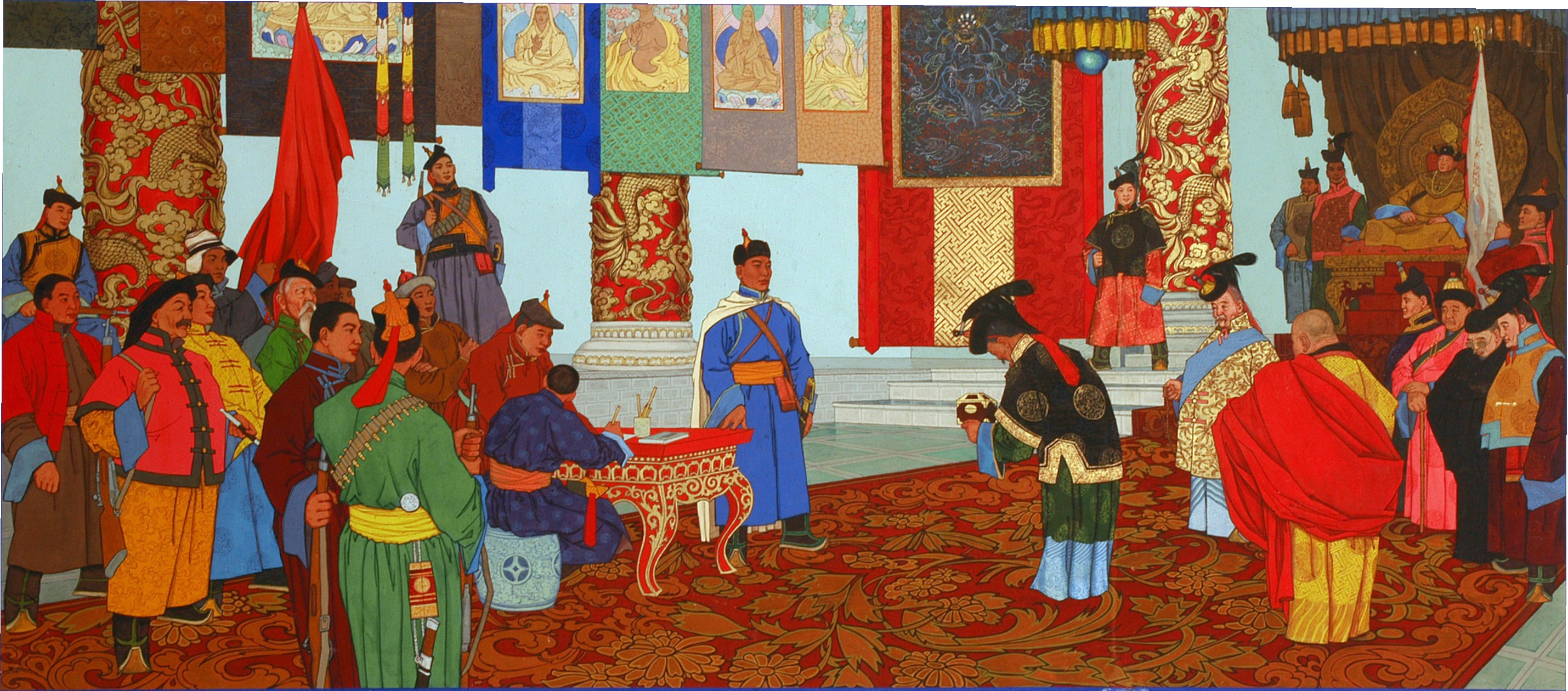
Mongolia's regime transferred to the People's Party, led by Sükhbaatar (painting)

Von Ungern-Sternberg's army, now defeated, began to crumble. His men deserted him, and he was seized by a Red Army detachment. The Soviets executed him later that same year. Fighting then shifted to western Mongolia, and by the end of 1921, the White Guards had either been destroyed or expelled.

The Chinese government was not indifferent to von Ungern-Sternberg's invasion, appointing Zhang Zuolin as commander of an expeditionary army to deal with it. However, the occupation of Urga by Red forces in July and internal Chinese warlord politics forced him to abandon his plans. Chinese forces slaughtered most of a 350 strong White Russian forces in June 1921 under Colonel Kazagrandi in the Gobi desert, with only two batches of 42 men and 35 men surrendering separately as Chinese were wiping out White Russian remnants following the Soviet Red army defeat of Ungern Sternberg, and other Buryat and White Russian remnants of Ungern-Sternberg's army were massacred by Soviet Red Army and Mongol forces in the same summer, in Uliastai Mongols beat Colonel Vangdabov's Buryats to death with clubs for being loyal to Ungern-Sternberg..

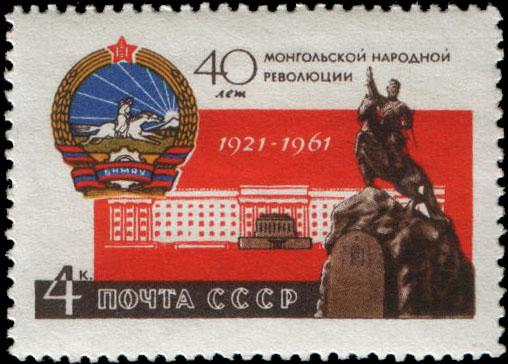
1961 stamp marking the 40th anniversary of the Mongolian Revolution, with the Sukhe Bator monument

On the diplomatic front, the Soviets had proposed to the Chinese the convening of a tripartite conference, similar to that of 1914–15, to discuss Mongolia's relationship with China. The Chinese government, however, emboldened by the prospect of Zhang's expedition, responded that Mongolia was part of China, and thus could not be the subject of international negotiations. It was not until 1924 that a Chinese-Soviet treaty was concluded, by which the Soviet Union recognised Mongolia as an integral part of China, and agreed to withdraw its troops. The treaty notwithstanding, the death of the Khutuktu in that same year provided an opportunity for the MPP to dispense with theocratic rule entirely, and the Party announced the establishment of the Mongolian People's Republic. In 1946, the Chinese Nationalist government recognized the full sovereignty of the Mongolian People's Republic, though the KMT-led Republic of China was to withdraw that recognition after its retreat to Taiwan. However, the Republic of China reiterates its recognition of Mongolia's independence in 2002.

On May 21, 2012, the Mainland Affairs Council of the Republic of China stated that Mongolia (commonly known as Outer Mongolia in China and other Mandarin-speaking territories) should be considered as an independent country. Furthermore, this statement also denied that Outer Mongolia is part of its constitutional territorial claims. However, the ROC government in Taiwan continued to appoint ministers of Mongolian and Tibetan Affairs Commission until 2017.

== See also ==
- List of states and regions involved in the Russian Civil War
- Bibliography of the Russian Revolution and Civil War
- Outline of the Russian Revolution and Civil War
- Mongolian Revolution of 1911
- Chinese occupation of Mongolia
- Soviet intervention in Mongolia
- Mongolian People's Republic
