= Transbaikal electoral district =

Legislative constituency of the Russian Republic

Transbaikal
- Former Civilian constituency for the All-Russian Constituent Assembly
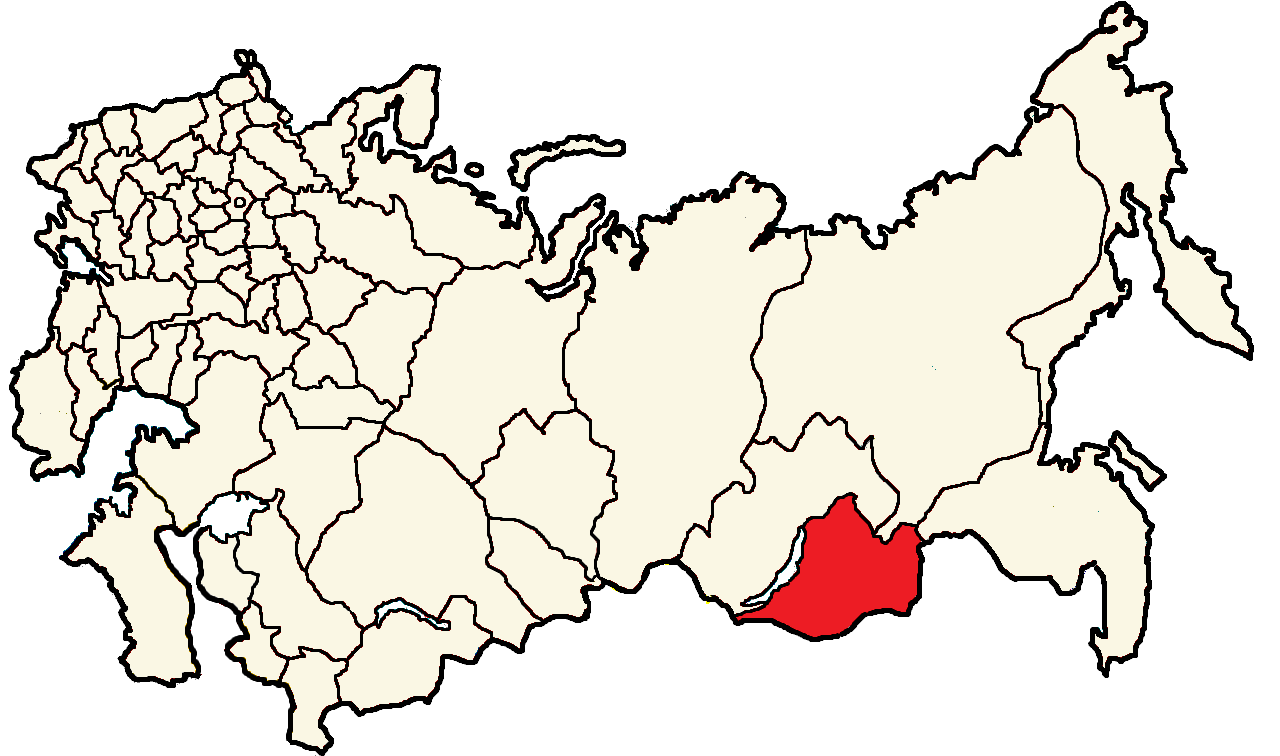

Former constituency
- Created: 1917
- Abolished: 1918
- Number of members: 7
- Number of Uyezd Electoral Commissions: 8
- Number of Urban Electoral Commissions: 1
- Number of Parishes: 141

The Transbaikal electoral district (Russian: Забайкальский избирательный округ) was a constituency created for the 1917 Russian Constituent Assembly election. The electoral district covered the Transbaikal Oblast. 6 out of the 15 submitted lists in Transbaikal were rejected by the electoral authorities.

In Transbaikal the local Bolshevik party organization had steered away from the party centre, and cooperated with the local Mensheviks and Socialist-Revolutionaries. In May 1917 the three parties had a joint list for the local government election. As of July 1917 Bolsheviks and Mensheviks were still holding joint meetings in Chita. The city was ruled by a People's Soviet, gathering SRs (both right and left-wing factions), Mensheviks and Bolsheviks. Only in the immediate run-up to the October Revolution was an All-Siberian Executive Bureau of the Bolshevik Party formed and the Siberian Bolsheviks began to conform with the party line.

== Results ==
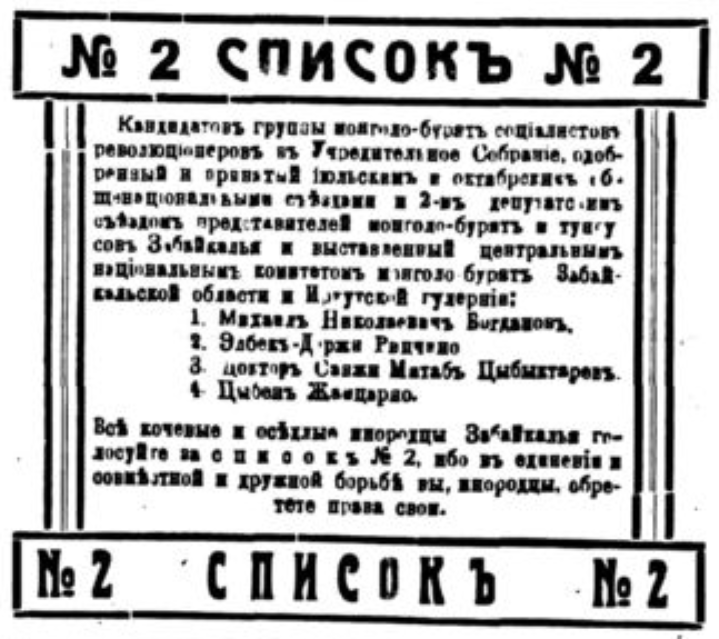
Advert for the Buryat list in a local newspaper

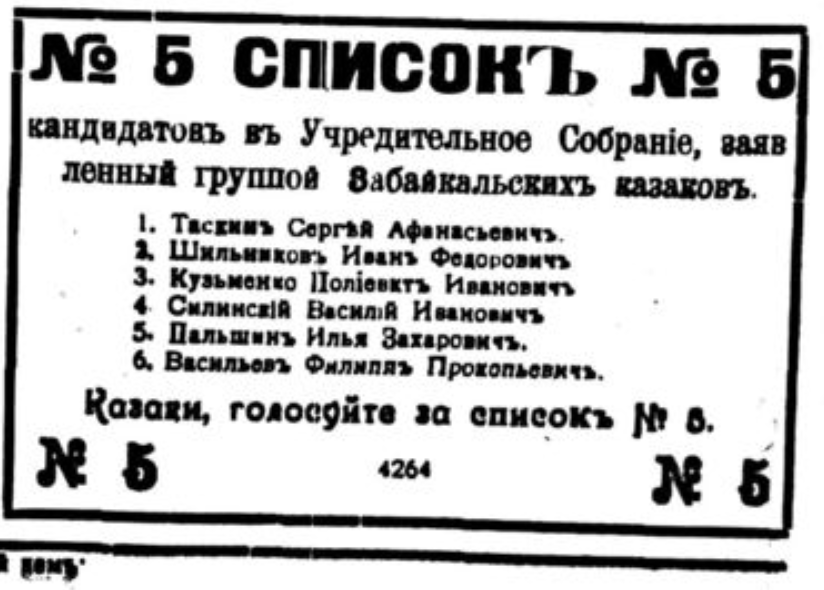
Advert for the Cossack list in a local newspaper

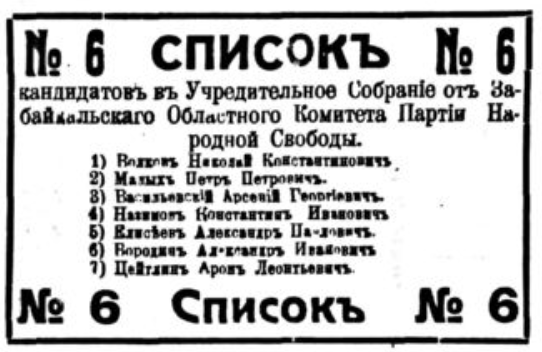
Advert for the Kadet list in a local newspaper

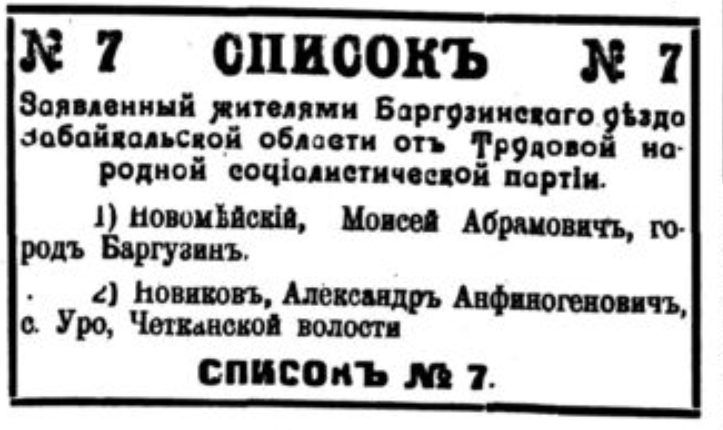
Advert for one of the Popular Socialist lists in a local newspaper

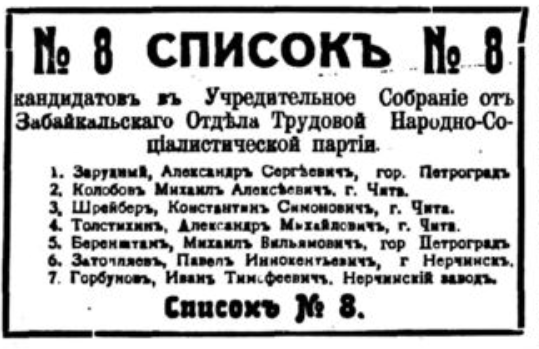
Advert for the other Popular Socialist list in a local newspaper

Transbaikal
Party	Vote	%
List 4 - Socialist-Revolutionaries	49,363	50.26
List 2 - Buryat National Committee	17,083	17.39
List 5 - Transbaikal Cossacks	12,854	13.09
List 1 - Bolsheviks- Menshevik-Internationalists	8,560	8.71
List 6 - Kadets	4,111	4.19
Popular Socialists: List 7 - Popular Socialists and Citizens of Barguzin Uezd; List 8 - Transbaikal Division of the Popular Socialists	2,682	2.73
List 3 - Mensheviks	2,154	2.19
List 9 - Union of Transbaikal Old Believers	1,418	1.44
Total:	98,225	

Deputies Elected
Bogdanov	Buryat National Committee
Dobromyslov	SR
Flegontov	SR
Kruglikov	SR
Pumpyanskiy	SR
Simakov	SR
Taskin	Transbaikal Cossacks

Rupen (1964) lists largely similar results as Radkey, but with different totals for the Union of Transbaikal Old Believers (176 votes) and instead of the Popular Socialists he mentions a "Barguzin Branch, RSDRP" with 1,248 votes. He refers to the Mensheviks as "Chita Branch, RSDRP [Mensheviks]".
