= Viktoria Maladaeva =

Indigenous rights activist from Russia

- Organization: Indigenous of Russia (co-founder)
- Known for: Indigenous rights activism

Viktoria Maladaeva is an Indigenous rights activist from the Republic of Buryatia in eastern Siberia, Russia. She has gained recognition for her efforts in advocating for the rights of Indigenous peoples and her opposition to Russia's full scale invasion of Ukraine.

== Early life and education ==
Maladaeva began her activism in her native Buryatia by contributing to her boarding school's newspaper, where she exposed various issues, including abuse by the teaching staff. After moving to Saint Petersburg, she competed in the Mrs. St. Petersburg beauty pageant, which was seen as defying the social norm that only ethnically Russian women could participate. Her involvement in the pageant drew online harassment, fueled by her outspoken opposition to government policies.

== Activism ==
=== Free Buryatia Foundation ===
In response to Russia's full-scale invasion of Ukraine in 2022, Maladaeva co-founded the Free Buryatia Foundation, an advocacy group established to support conscientious objectors from Buryatia. The foundation aimed to counteract the government's narrative that presented non-Slavic indigenous participants in the invasion as being responsible for most of the brutality. Maladaeva and her colleagues produced videos featuring Buryats speaking against the war, some of which garnered over a million views. They also provided legal assistance to those unwilling to fight, highlighting the systemic issues leading to the overrepresentation of ethnic minorities in the military.

=== Indigenous of Russia ===
After leaving the Free Buryatia Foundation in 2023, Maladaeva founded Indigenous of Russia, a project aimed at fostering closer ties between Russia's Indigenous peoples and minorities. Maladaeva is a vocal proponent of decolonization, advocating for Indigenous peoples of Russia to have more autonomy. She has criticized the Russian liberal opposition for not adequately addressing issues of racism and arrogance towards Indigenous activists.
