= Elbegdorj =

Elbegdorj (Mongolian: Элбэгдорж) is a Mongolian personal name. Notable people bearing this name include:

- Rinchingiin Elbegdorj (1888–1938), Buryat revolutionary in the early Mongolian People's Republic
- Tsakhiagiin Elbegdorj (born 1963), President of Mongolia in 2009–2017, Prime Minister in 1998 and 2004–2006
