= State of Buryat-Mongolia =

1917–1921 state in East Asia

State of Buryat-Mongolia Буряад-Монгол улас (Buryat) ᠪᠤᠷᠢᠠᠳ ᠮᠣᠩᠭᠣᠯ ᠤᠯᠤᠰ (Buryat) Государство Бурят-Монголия (Russian) Gosudarstvo Buryat-Mongoliya
- 1917–1921
- Buryat-Mongolia in green
- Capital: Chita; 52°03′N 113°28′E
- Common languages: Buryat-Mongolian, Mongolian, Russian
- Religion: Tibetan Buddhism, Orthodox Christianity
- Government: Republic
- Legislature: Burnatskom
- History
  - Independence: 25 April 1917
  - Dissolution: 1921
- Currency: Rouble of Russian Empire
Preceded by	Succeeded by
Russian Republic	Far Eastern Republic; Russian Soviet Federative Socialist Republic

The State of Buryat-Mongolia (Note: Russian Buryat: Буряад-Монгол улас, romanized: Buriaad-Mongol ulas ᠪᠤᠷᠢᠠᠳ ᠮᠣᠩᠭᠣᠯ ᠤᠯᠤᠰ) was a buffer Buryat-Mongolian state, during the Russian Civil War. The main government body was Burnatskom, the Buryat National Committee.

The state de facto ceased to exist after the formation of the Far Eastern Republic, which divided Buryat-Mongolia in two: 4 aimags became part of the Far Eastern Republic, while the other 4 formed Buryat-Mongol autonomies of the RSFSR.
