= Pan-Mongolism =

Irredentist political view

Regions commonly associated with Mongol irredentism

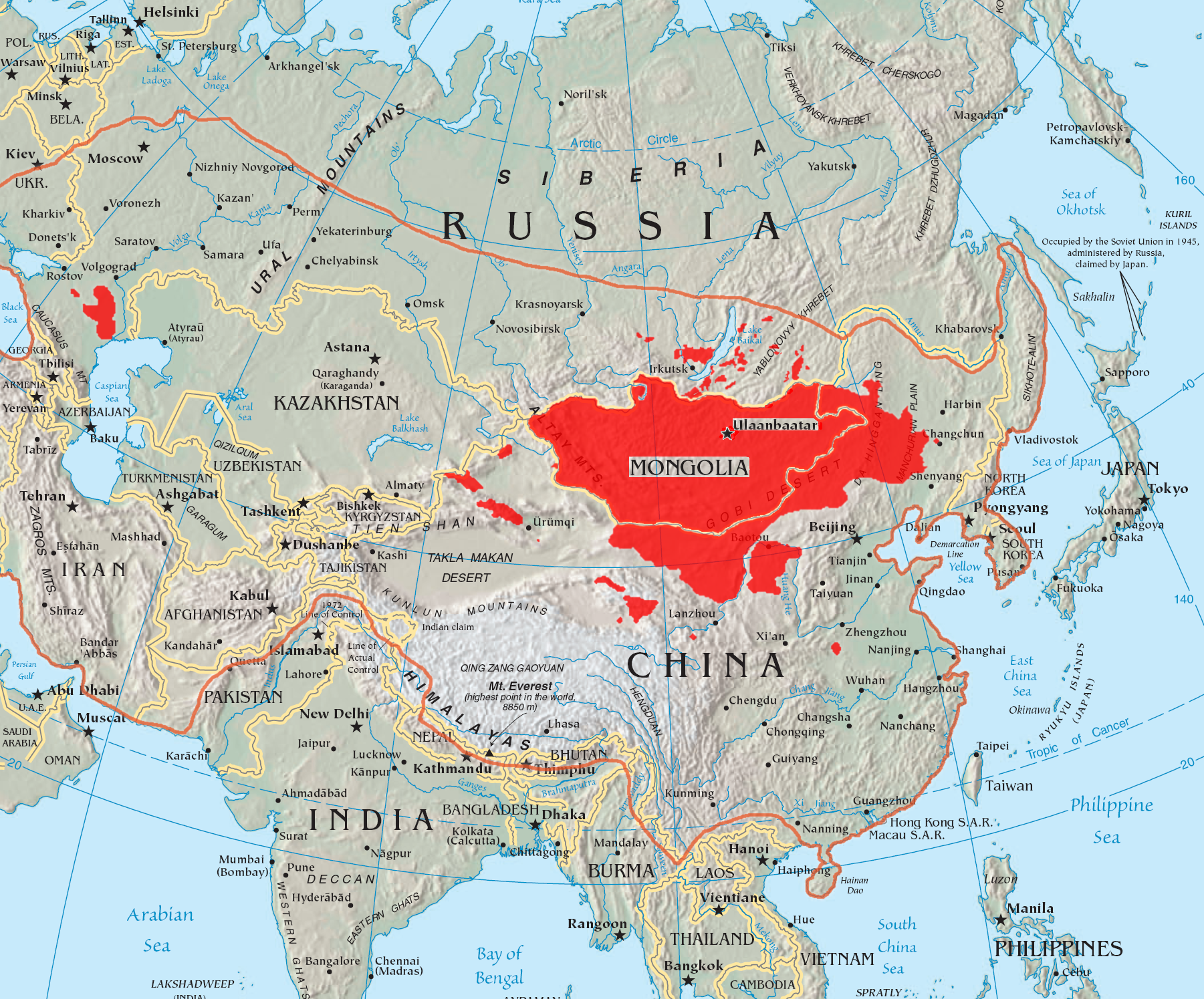
Concentrations of Mongolic peoples (red) compared to the extent of the Mongol Empire (outlined in orange)

Pan-Mongolism is an irredentist idea that advocates cultural and political solidarity of Mongols. The proposed territory, called "Greater Mongolia" (Mongolian: Даяар Монгол, Dayaar Mongol) or "Whole Mongolia" (Хамаг Монгол) usually includes the independent state of Mongolia, the Chinese region of Inner Mongolia, and the Russian region of Buryatia. Sometimes the autonomous republic Tuva, the Altai Republic and parts of Xinjiang, Zabaykalsky Krai, and Irkutsk Oblast are included as well. As of 2006, all areas in Greater Mongolia (or Mongol heartland) except Mongolia have non-Mongol majorities.

The nationalist movement emerged in the 20th century in response to the collapse of the Qing dynasty and the possibility of an independent Mongolian state. After the Red Army helped to establish the Mongolian People's Republic, Mongolian foreign policy prioritised seeking recognition of independence over territorial expansion. After the 1990 Mongolian Revolution ended Communist rule in Mongolia, a number of organizations have emerged that promote pan-Mongolism, but they have little popular support.

== History ==
=== Early 20th century ===
The Qing dynasty (1644–1912) controlled modern-day Mongolia, Tuva, Western Mongolia, and Inner Mongolia. However, before the People's Republic of China (1949–present) greatly expanded the territory of Inner Mongolia to its present shape, Inner Mongolia only referred to the Mongol areas within the Chinese provinces of Ningxia, Suiyuan, and Chahar. The Mongols in Manchuria, known then as Xing'an but now as Hulunbuir, were considered to be ethnically distinct from both the Inner and Outer Mongol tribes, and this region was called "Eastern Mongolia". Inner Mongolia, which had joined the Qing in 1636 as allies rather than conquered subjects, were directly administered and taxed by the Qing, and given access to the Qing aristocracy. Outer Mongolia was given more autonomy, nomadic rights, and its own Buddhist center. Having colonized Buryatia in the 17th century, and the Amur Basin in 1862, the Imperial Russian government pursued policies in support of a "long-range expansionist policy intended to one day strip control of Mongolia away from China".

At the turn of the 20th century, the Qing, reasoning that the Russians would have a harder time annexing territory settled by many Han people, reduced its many restrictions on Han settlement within Qing territory. This policy spurred an anti-Chinese Greater Mongolia nationalism among a few Mongols.

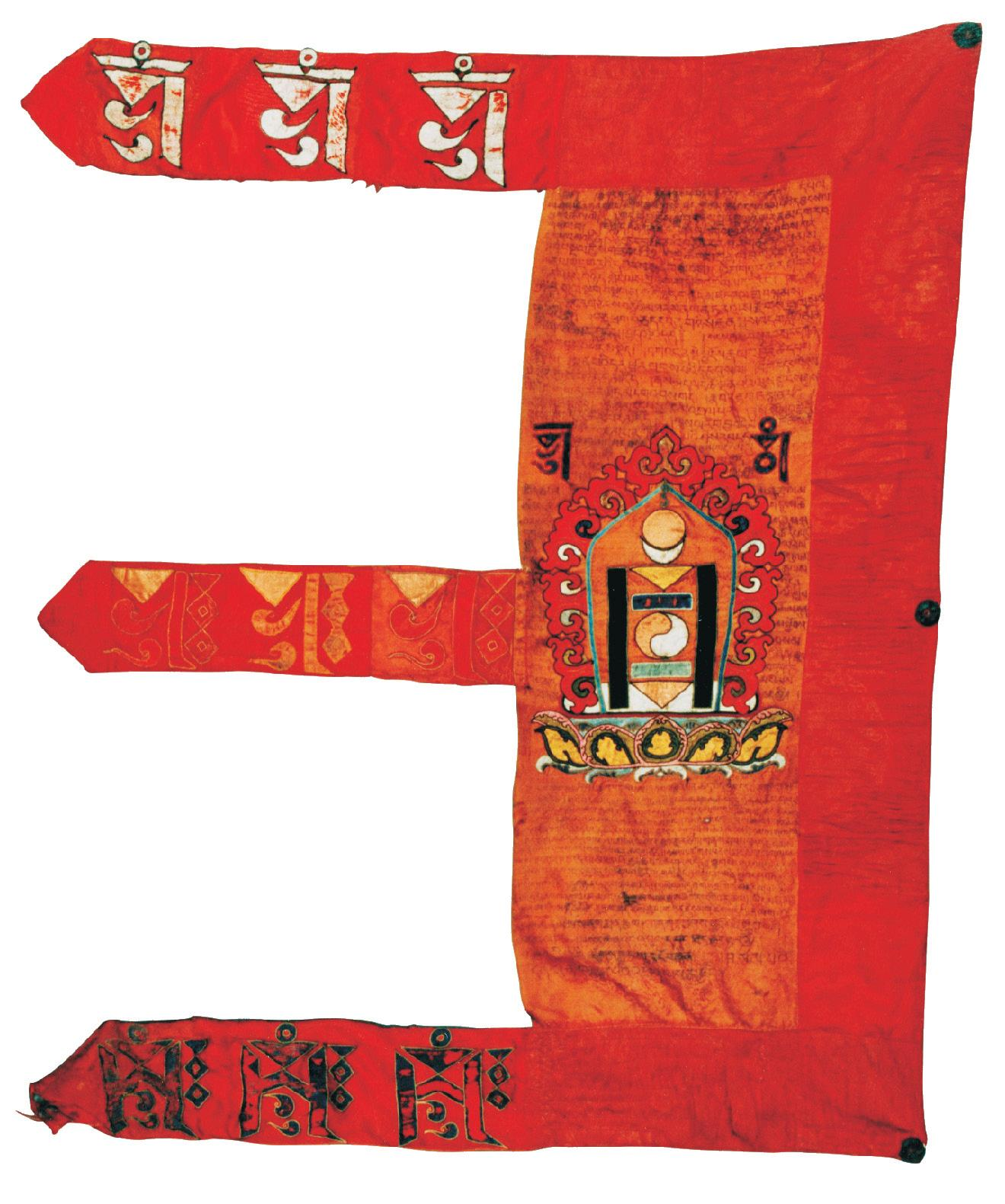
Flag of Mongolia, preserved in the National Museum of Mongolia

In 1911, Mongolia declared its independence and founded the Bogd Khaganate.

When the Qing dynasty collapsed with establishment of the new Republic of China (ROC) in 1911, majority of the Inner Mongolian principalities allied themselves with the Outer Mongols rather than with the Mongolian Bogd Khaganate. China's early republican leaders used slogans like Five Races Under One Union, democracy, and meritocracy to try to persuade all of the Mongols to join the new republic. However, they were never really able to hide their condescension towards the frontier peoples. In the summer of 1911, Mongolia's princes had already decided to declare independence and turn towards Russia for support. They gathered with Russian representatives in Ulaanbaatar and persuaded Russia to defend Mongol autonomy within China. The Russians understood this autonomy to apply only in Outer Mongolia, but the princes interpreted it as sanctifying a Greater Mongolia of Outer Mongolia, Inner Mongolia, Eastern Mongolia, and Tannu Uriankhai (Tuva).

The Inner Mongolian prince Gungsangnorbu corresponded with the autonomous government in Ulaanbaatar about the possibility of a Greater Mongolia. They found that they had sharp disagreements about such a state, owing to the Inner Mongols' agricultural lifestyle and orientation towards China, contrasted with the Outer Mongols' nomadic lifestyle and orientation towards Russia.

Mongols have at times advocated for the historical Oirat Dzungar Mongol area of Dzungaria in northern Xinjiang, to be annexed to the Mongolian state in the name of Pan-Mongolism.

Legends grew among the remaining Oirats that Amursana had not died after he fled to Russia, but was alive and would return to his people to liberate them from Manchu Qing rule and restore the Oirat nation. Prophecies had been circulating about the return of Amursana and the revival of the Oirats in the Altai region. The Oirat Kalmyk Ja Lama claimed to be a grandson of Amursana and then claimed to be a reincarnation of Amursana himself, preaching anti-Manchu propaganda in western Mongolia in the 1890s and calling for the overthrow of the Qing dynasty. Ja Lama was arrested and deported several times. However, he returned to the Oirat Torghuts in Altay (in Dzungaria) in 1910 and in 1912 he helped the Outer Mongolians mount an attack on the last Qing garrison at Kovd, where the Manchu Amban was refusing to leave and fighting the newly declared independent Mongolian state. The Manchu Qing force was defeated and slaughtered by the Mongols after Khovd fell.

Ja Lama told the Oirat remnants in Xinjiang: "I am a mendicant monk from the Russian Tsar's kingdom, but I am born of the great Mongols. My herds are on the Volga river, my water source is the Irtysh. There are many hero warriors with me. I have many riches. Now I have come to meet with you beggars, you remnants of the Oirats, in the time when the war for power begins. Will you support the enemy? My homeland is Altai, Irtysh, Khobuk-sari, Emil, Bortala, Ili, and Alatai. This is the Oirat mother country. By descent, I am the great-grandson of Amursana, the reincarnation of Mahakala, owning the horse Maralbashi. I am he whom they call the hero Dambijantsan. I came to move my pastures back to my own land, to collect my subject households and bondservants, to give favour, and to move freely."

Ja Lama built an Oirat fiefdom centered around Kovd, he and fellow Oirats from Altai wanted to emulate the original Oirat empire and build another grand united Oirat nation from the nomads of western China and Mongolia, but was arrested by Russian Cossacks and deported in 1914 on the request of the Mongolian government after the local Mongols complained of his excesses, and out of fear that he would create an Oirat separatist state and divide them from the Khalkha Mongols. Ja Lama returned in 1918 to Mongolia and resumed his activities and supported himself by extorting passing caravans, but was assassinated in 1922 on the orders of the new Communist Mongolian authorities under Damdin Sükhbaatar.

The part Buryat Mongol Transbaikalian Cossack Ataman Grigory Semyonov declared a "Great Mongol State" in 1918 and had designs to unify the Oirat Mongol lands, portions of Xinjiang, Transbaikal, Inner Mongolia, Outer Mongolia, Tannu Uriankhai, Khovd, Hu-lun-pei-erh and Tibet into one Mongolian state.

From 1919 to 1921, a Chinese army led by Xu Shuzheng occupied Outer Mongolia. This period ended when White Russian General Baron Roman von Ungern-Sternberg protected independence of Mongolia, who deported the Chinese occupation army from Outer Mongolia The Han percentage of the industrial labor force dropped from 63 percent to 10 percent in 1932.

=== World War II ===
The Soviet-led Outer Mongolian Revolution of 1921 fixed independent Mongolia's present borders to include only Outer Mongolia, because of the Soviets' needs for a buffer state rather than a vague frontier. The Buryat Mongol Agvan Dorzhiev tried advocating for Oirat Mongol areas like Tarbagatai, Ili, and Altai to get added to the Outer Mongolian state. Out of concern that China would be provoked, this proposed addition of the Oirat Dzungaria to the new Outer Mongolian state was rejected by the Soviets. The unsatisfied leaders of Outer Mongolia would often encouraged and support vigilantes who attempted to ethnically cleanse the Han Chinese from Inner and Eastern Mongolia; many failed rebel leaders fled to Outer Mongolia. After the Japanese invasion of China in 1937, the Japanese installed the puppet Mengjiang government in Inner Mongolia, and Manchukuo to include Eastern Mongolia. Imperial Japanese policy flirted with pan-Mongolism as a weapon against the Chinese, but it maintained the traditional Chinese political divisions of the Mongols, as its main focus was to promote Japanese, rather than Mongolian, language and culture. During the Japanese occupation, Soviet–Japanese border conflicts pit Mongols on either side of the Sino-Mongolian border against one another, and according to one scholar "finalized the permanent separation of Mongolia and Inner Mongolia". Nonetheless, war propaganda by the Soviet Union and Outer Mongolia encouraged Inner and Eastern Mongolians to fight against the Japanese to create a Greater Mongolia. Prince Demchugdongrub, operating from Eastern Mongolia, was a supporter of Pan-Mongolism and a Japanese collaborator.

In 1943, the British Foreign and Commonwealth Office predicted that the Soviet Union would promote the idea of a Greater Mongolia to detach China's Inner Mongolia and East Mongolia from Chinese influence. A year later, the then-Soviet satellite Tuvan People's Republic was annexed by into the Russian SFSR. During the Soviet invasion of Manchuria in August 1945, Outer Mongolian troops occupied both Inner and Eastern Mongolia, and Japanese collaboratist leaders like De Wang were kidnapped to Outer Mongolia to be inculcated with pan-Mongolist ideals. Perceiving an imminent threat to China's territorial integrity, Chiang Kai-shek signed an agreement with the Soviets during the Mongolian occupation which gave Chinese recognition of Outer Mongolian independence. In return for the fulfillment of this longtime Soviet foreign policy goal, the agreement stated that Mongolian independence would only be effective "within [Outer Mongolia's] existing frontiers". The Outer Mongolian troops subsequently withdrew from China. In 1947, Chiang renewed his claim on Outer Mongolia in response to alleged Mongolian incursions into Chinese Xinjiang during the Pei-ta-shan Incident.

=== 1949–1990 ===
The Chinese Communist Revolution saw the People’s Republic of China recognition of Mongolian independence, and promised a new era of communist fraternity between the Chinese, Mongolian, and Soviet governments. In the same year, Soviet diplomat Anastas Mikoyan visited the Chinese Communist headquarters in Xibaipo to negotiate a new Sino-Soviet treaty. Chairman of the Chinese Communist Party Mao Zedong inquired about the possibility of a Greater Mongolia under Chinese control; Soviet premier Joseph Stalin replied, through Mikoyan, that since Outer Mongolia would never voluntarily give up its independence, the only way a Greater Mongolia would come about would be through the loss of Chinese territory. Mao subsequently abandoned any hope of a Chinese-led Greater Mongolia. China and the Soviet Union applied different ethnic policies to their Mongol minorities. While the Soviet Union encouraged local identities – Buryat instead of Buryat-Mongol, and Kalmyk instead of Kalmyk-Mongol, China encouraged its Mongols to deemphasize their tribal and local identities and to identify simply as "Mongol". The Mongolian communist government promoted the idea that all Mongols should be assimilated to the Khalkha subgroup, rejecting the idea of an inclusive Greater Mongolia state as disloyal to Mongolia.

China designed the entire Xinjiang, including former Oirat Mongol Dzungar territory in Dzungaria as "Xinjiang Uyghur Autonomous Region" on October 1, 1955. During the early 1950s, Mongolian leader Yumjaagiin Tsedenbal once visited China to ask for aid in grants and labor. China and the Soviet Union also collaborated to host pan-Mongolian festivals between Inner Mongolia and the Mongolian People's Republic. However, the Communist Party of the Soviet Union forbade celebrations of Genghis Khan because of negative Russian attitudes towards the Mongol conquests. The Sino-Soviet split from 1960 led Mongolia to align with the power they perceived as less threatening, i.e. the USSR, and to publish provocative pan-Mongol pieces in the Mongolian state press. During the 1980s, China-Mongolia relations improved with the exchange of Mongolian wrestling teams and Mikhail Gorbachev's pledge to withdraw Soviet troops from Mongolia.

=== 1990–present ===
After the Mongolian Revolution in 1990 brought about a "truly independent" Mongolia apart from Soviet influence, both China and Russia expressed concerns that the pan-Mongol nationalism that was flourishing in Mongolia could penetrate into their borderlands. A surge in pan-Mongol sentiment resulted in a series of "Unite the Three Mongolias" conferences in Ulaanbaatar, as well as government-funded organizations for "international Mongol cultural development". In 1992, Mongolia's foreign ministry published an extensive list of territory it claimed to have "lost" to various areas in China and Russia in border demarcations in 1915, 1932, 1940, 1957, 1962, and 1975. At the same time, three main criticisms of pan-Mongolism emerged in Mongolia. The first emphasized Mongolian nationalism, which argued that Mongolia needed to integrate its existing non-Mongol minorities, such as its Kazakhs, rather than to expand outside of its borders. The second expressed a belief in the superiority of the Khalkha Mongols as the most racially pure Mongols ("Khalkha-centrism"), looking down on the Buryat and Inner Mongols as Russian and Chinese "half-breeds", respectively. The third criticism noted that the political power of those within the current borders of Mongolia would be diluted in a Greater Mongolia. Khalkha centric nationalists discriminate against Oirat and Buryats from Russia and Inner Mongols from China, viewing them as agents of Russia and China respectively.

In 1994, China and Mongolia signed a treaty wherein both promised to respect each other's territorial integrity. In the same year, the Inner Mongolia branch of the Chinese Communist Party explicitly repudiated and condemned the idea of a Greater Mongolia, citing the threat to China's unity and the likely dominance of Mongolia in such a union. Because of the existence of an independent Mongolian state, Inner Mongols have generally not aspired to an independent state of their own, and what little separatist sentiment in Inner Mongolia aspires to union with independent Mongolia. The feelings are not reciprocated, as the history and geography of China are not taught in Mongolian schools, and knowledge of the Inner Mongols in Mongolia is low. Similarly to the Inner Mongolian government, high-ranking Buryat officials have reacted to the Greater Mongolia idea by rejecting that Buryats are Mongols at all. Since the normalization of Sino-Mongolian relations in 1994, the Mongolian government does not support Greater Mongolian nationalism, but it tolerates organizations in Mongolia which do, such as the Mongolian newspaper Il Tovchuu. Various small organizations in Mongolia advocate a Greater Mongolia.
