= List of heads of the military of post-imperial Russia =

This article presents the heads of the military departments of the Russian Provisional Government (Russian Republic), the Russian SFSR, the Soviet Union and the Russian Federation.

== Provisional Government (1917) ==
Ministers of War and Navy of the Russian Provisional Government
Portrait	Name	Time in office		Prime Minister
	Alexander Guchkov	16 March 1917	13 May 1917	Georgy Lvov
	Alexander Kerensky	18 May 1917	14 September 1917	Georgy Lvov
	Alexander Kerensky	18 May 1917	14 September 1917	Alexander Kerensky
	Colonel → Major general Alexander Verkhovsky	14 September 1917	7 November 1917	Alexander Kerensky
Minister of the Navy of the Russian Provisional Government
	Counter admiral Dmitry Verderevsky	14 September 1917	7 November 1917	Alexander Kerensky

== Provisional All-Russian Government/Russian State (1918–1920) ==
Portrait	Name	Time in office		Prime Minister	Head of state
Minister of War and Navy of the Provisional All-Russian Government
	Vice admiral Alexander Kolchak	4 November 1918	18 November 1918	Pyotr Vologodsky	Nikolai Avksentiev
Ministers of War of the Russian State
	Lieutenant general Nikolai Stepanov	18 November 1918	23 May 1919	Pyotr Vologodsky	Alexander Kolchak
	Major general Dmitry Lebedev	23 May 1919	10 August 1919	Pyotr Vologodsky	Alexander Kolchak
	Lieutenant general Mikhail Diterikhs	10 August 1919	27 August 1919	Pyotr Vologodsky	Alexander Kolchak
	Lieutenant general Alexei von Budberg	27 August 1919	5 October 1919	Pyotr Vologodsky	Alexander Kolchak
	General of the Artillery; Mikhail Khanzhin	5 October 1919	4 January 1920	Pyotr Vologodsky	Alexander Kolchak
	General of the Artillery; Mikhail Khanzhin	5 October 1919	4 January 1920	Viktor Pepelyayev	Alexander Kolchak
Minister of the Navy of the Russian State
	Captain 1st rank → Counter admiral Mikhail Smirnov	18 November 1918	4 January 1920	Pyotr Vologodsky; Viktor Pepelyayev	Alexander Kolchak

== Russian Soviet Federative Socialist Republic (1917–1922) ==
People's Commissars for Military and Naval Affairs of the RSFSR
Portrait	Name	Time in office	
	Nikolai Podvoisky	23 November 1917	13 March 1918
	Leon Trotsky	13 March 1918	12 November 1923

== Union of Soviet Socialist Republics (1922–1991) ==
Portrait	Name	Time in office	
People's Commissars for Military and Naval Affairs of the USSR
	Leon Trotsky	12 November 1923	26 January 1925
	Mikhail Frunze	26 January 1925	31 October 1925
	Kliment Voroshilov	6 November 1925	20 June 1934
People's Commissars of Defense of the USSR
	Marshal of the Soviet Union; Kliment Voroshilov	20 June 1934	7 May 1940
	Marshal of the Soviet Union; Semyon Timoshenko	7 May 1940	19 July 1941
	Marshal of the Soviet Union → Generalissimo; Joseph Stalin	19 July 1941	25 February 1946
People's Commissars of the Navy of the USSR
	Army Commissar of 1st rank Pyotr Smirnov	30 December 1937	30 June 1938
	Komandarm 1st rank Mikhail Frinovsky	8 September 1938	20 March 1939
	Admiral → Admiral of the fleet Nikolai Kuznetsov	28 April 1939	25 February 1946
People's Commissar of the Armed Forces of the USSR
	Generalissimo; Joseph Stalin	25 February 1946	15 March 1946
Ministers of the Armed Forces of the USSR
	Generalissimo; Joseph Stalin	15 March 1946	3 March 1947
	Marshal of the Soviet Union; Nikolay Bulganin	3 March 1947	24 March 1949
	Marshal of the Soviet Union; Alexander Vasilevsky	24 March 1949	25 February 1950
Minister of War of the USSR
	Marshal of the Soviet Union; Alexander Vasilevsky	25 February 1950	15 March 1953
Ministers of Navy of the USSR
	Admiral; Ivan Yumashev	25 February 1950	20 July 1951
	Vice admiral Nikolai Kuznetsov	20 July 1951	15 March 1953
Ministers of Defense of the USSR
	Marshal of the Soviet Union; Nikolay Bulganin	15 March 1953	9 February 1955
	Marshal of the Soviet Union; Georgy Zhukov	9 February 1955	26 October 1957
	Marshal of the Soviet Union; Rodion Malinovsky	26 October 1957	31 March 1967
	Marshal of the Soviet Union; Andrey Grechko	12 April 1967	26 April 1976
	Army general → Marshal of the Soviet Union; Dmitry Ustinov	29 April 1976	20 December 1984
	Marshal of the Soviet Union; Sergey Sokolov	22 December 1984	30 May 1987
	Army general → Marshal of the Soviet Union; Dmitry Yazov	30 May 1987	29 August 1991
	Marshal of Aviation; Yevgeny Shaposhnikov	29 August 1991	14 February 1992

== Russian Federation (1991–present) ==
Portrait	Name	Time in office	
Minister of Defense of the Russian SFSR
	Colonel general → Army general Konstantin Kobets	20 August 1991	9 September 1991
Ministers of Defense of Russia
	Boris Yeltsin (acting)	16 March 1992	18 May 1992
	Army general Pavel Grachev	18 May 1992	18 June 1996
	Army general Mikhail Kolesnikov (acting)	18 June 1996	17 July 1996
	Colonel general → Army general Igor Rodionov	17 July 1996	23 May 1997
	Army general → Marshal of the Russian Federation; Igor Sergeyev	23 May 1997	28 March 2001
	Colonel general Sergei Ivanov	28 March 2001	15 February 2007
	Anatoly Serdyukov	15 February 2007	6 November 2012
	Army general Sergei Shoigu	6 November 2012	12 May 2024
	Andrey Belousov	14 May 2024	incumbent

== See also ==
- List of heads of the military of Imperial Russia
