= Russian Government (1918–1919) =

1918–1919 Russian government in the Russian Civil War

- Coat of arms

- Flag of Russia

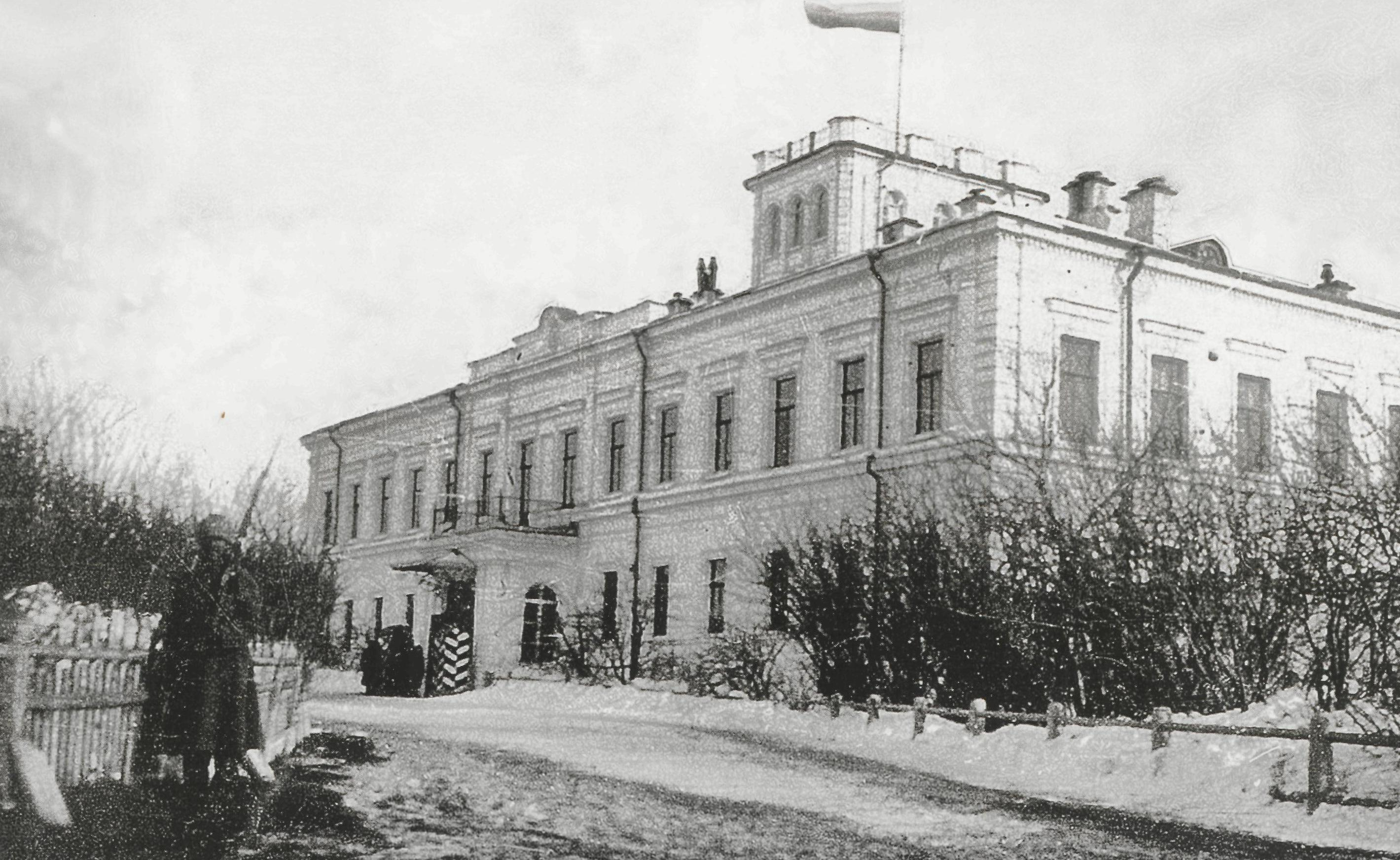
- Palace of the Supreme Ruler and Council of Ministers in Omsk

Department overview
- Formed: November 18, 1918; 107 years ago
- Preceding Department: Provisional All-Russian Government (PA-RG)
- Dissolved: January 5, 1920; 106 years ago
- Superseding Department: South Russian Government, Government of the Eastern Okraina
- Jurisdiction: (Russia) Russian State
- Headquarters: Omsk (until 10 November 1919)
- Ministers responsible: Pyotr Vologodsky; Viktor Pepelyayev

The Russian Government (Government of the Russian State, Omsk government, Kolchak government) was the highest executive body in White-controlled parts of Russia during the Russian Civil War, formed as a result of the coup of 18 November 1918 in Omsk headed by Alexander Kolchak.

== Composition ==
=== Overview ===
The government was composed of the Supreme Ruler, the Council of Ministers and the Council of the Supreme Ruler. The government also included the Extraordinary State Economic Conference, which was later transformed into the State Economic Conference. On 17 December 1918, a special “Preparatory Conference” was created under the Government to deal with foreign policy issues and coordinate activities with the delegation of the “Russian Political Conference” representing Whites at the Paris Peace Conference. Under Kolchak, the Governing Senate (the highest court) was restored. The Department of Police and State Security, officially included in the Ministry of Internal Affairs, was actually an independent structure. The leadership of the ideological work was entrusted to the Central Information Department at the General Staff and the Press Department at the Chancellery of the Council of Ministers. The government consisted mainly of former members of the Council of Ministers of the Ufa directory, who contributed to Kolchak's coup. It united Siberian regional cadets, popular socialists, etc.

=== Supreme Ruler ===
Alexander Kolchak, as the head of state, concentrated all branches of government in his hands: executive, legislative and judicial. The Supreme Ruler had unlimited power and was the highest governing body. Any legislative act became effective only after being signed by the Supreme Ruler. Also, the Supreme Ruler was at the same time the Supreme Commander-in-Chief. The power of the Supreme Ruler was viewed as exclusively temporary, until the victory over the Bolsheviks and the re-convocation of the Constituent Assembly.

=== Council of Ministers ===
Under Kolchak, the Council of Ministers was endowed with extremely broad powers. It was a body of not only the executive, but also the legislative branch. The Council considered decrees and acts prior to their approval by the Supreme Ruler.

Portfolio	Minister	Took office	Left office
Prime Minister	Pyotr Vologodsky	18 November 1918	21 November 1919
Prime Minister	Viktor Pepelyayev	22 November 1919	5 January 1920
Minister of Internal Affairs	Alexander Gattenberger	18 November 1918	29 April 1919
Minister of Internal Affairs	Viktor Pepelyayev	May 1919	22 November 1919
Minister of Internal Affairs	Alexander Cherven-Vodali	22 November 1919	4 January 1920
Minister of Foreign Affairs	Yuri Klyuchnikov	18 November 1918	December 1918
Minister of Foreign Affairs	Ivan Sukin	December 1918	3 December 1919
Minister of Foreign Affairs	Sergey Tretyakov	3 December 1919	4 January 1920
Minister of Finance	Ivan Mikhailov	18 November 1918	16 August 1919
Minister of Finance	Lev Hoyer	16 August 1919	3 December 1919
Minister of Finance	Pavel Buryshkin	3 December 1919	4 January 1920
Minister of Justice	Sergei Starynkevich	18 November 1918	2 May 1919
Minister of Justice	Georgy Telberg	16 August 1919	29 November 1919
Minister of Justice	Alexander Morozov	29 November 1919	4 January 1920
Minister of War	Nikolay Stepanov	18 November 1918	23 May 1919
Minister of War	Dmitry Lebedev	23 May 1919	10 August 1919
Minister of War	Mikhail Diterikhs	10 August 1919	27 August 1919
Minister of War	Alexei von Budberg	27 August 1919	5 October 1919
Minister of War	Mikhail Khanzhin	5 October 1919	4 January 1920
Minister of Navy	Mikhail Smirnov	20 November 1918	4 January 1920
Minister of Labour	Leonid Shumilovsky	18 November 1918	4 January 1920
Minister of Agriculture	Nikolay Petrov	18 November 1918	4 January 1920
Minister of Railways	Leonid Ustrugov	18 November 1918	13 November 1919
Minister of Railways	Alexei Larionov	13 November 1919	4 January 1920
Minister of Education	Vasily Sapozhnikov	18 November 1918	2 May 1919
Minister of Education	Pavel Preobrazhensky	6 May 1919	4 January 1920
Minister of Trade and Industry	Nikolay Shchukin	18 November 1918	6 May 1919
Minister of Trade and Industry	Ivan Mikhaylov	6 May 1919	16 August 1919
Minister of Trade and Industry	Sergey Tretyakov	September 1919	November 1919
Minister of Trade and Industry	Alexander Okorokov	29 November 1919	4 January
Minister of Supplies	Ivan Serebrennikov	18 November 1918	27 December 1918
Minister of Food and Supplies	Nikolai Zefirov	27 December 1918	1919
Minister of Food and Supplies	Konstantin Neklyutin	1919	4 January 1920
State Controller	Grigory Krasnov	18 November 1918	4 January 1920
Chief of Staff	Georgy Telberg	18 November 1918	16 August 1919
Chief of Staff	Georgy Gins	16 August 1919	4 January 1920

=== Council of the Supreme Ruler ===
The Council of the Supreme Ruler was formally an advisory body under Kolchak government, in fact it was a body for making major political decisions, which were legislatively formalized by decrees of the Supreme Ruler and the Council of Ministers. It was established by order of Kolchak on 21 November 1918 and consisted of:

1. Pyotr Vologodsky
2. Alexander Gattenberger (later Viktor Pepelyayev)
3. Ivan Mikhaylov
4. Georgy Telberg
5. Yuri Klyuchnikov (later Ivan Sukin)
6. Any person at the personal discretion of the Supreme Ruler.

The result of the creation of the Council of the Supreme Ruler was that the Council of Ministers was withdrawn from the politics. It lost many of its executive functions, focusing almost exclusively on legislative activity. This, however, did not last long.

The central place in the Council of the Supreme Ruler was taken by the Minister of Finance Ivan Mikhaylov. He was one of the most influential members of the government, but his popularity was low. Under public pressure on 16 August 1919, Mikhaylov was dismissed. After that, the Council of the Supreme Ruler began to meet extremely irregularly, and its importance practically disappeared. After the fall of Omsk, it never met.

=== Extraordinary State Economic Conference ===
A few days after the 18 November coup, the last state controller of the tsarist government, Sergey Fedosyev, submitted a note to Kolchak on the establishment of the Extraordinary State Economic Conference. According to the initial project, it was assumed that representatives from trade and industry would prevail in it. The Council of Ministers expanded its representation from cooperation. In this form, the decree was approved by the Supreme Ruler on November 22, 1918. Initially, it was almost exclusively a bureaucratic organization with the task of developing emergency measures in the field of finance, supplying the army and restoring the commercial and industrial apparatus. ESEC became a representative body on 2 May 1919, when it was transformed into the State Economic Conference. ESEC included Sergey Fedosyev as chairman, minister of Finance, minister of War, minister of Food and Supply, minister of Trade and Industry, minister of Railways, State Controller, three representatives of the boards of private and cooperative banks, five representatives of the All-Russian Council of Trade and Industry Congresses and three representatives of the Council of Cooperative Congresses.

The opening of the newly created State Economic Conference took place on 19 June 1919 in Omsk. It included 60 members: ministers, representatives from the banks, cooperatives, zemstvo assemblies and city councils, as well as from the Siberian, Ural, Orenburg and Transbaikal Cossack troops. Georgy Gins was the chairman of this body.

After the capture of Omsk by the Reds, the SEC moved to Irkutsk, where the meetings were resumed after 8 December 1919.

== Foreign policy ==
The Russian Government was recognized at the international level formally (de jure) by only one state, the Kingdom of Serbs, Croats and Slovenes. At the end of June 1919, Charge d'Affaires of the Yugoslav Foreign Ministry J. Milanković arrived in Omsk. Vasily Strandmann was approved as an envoy in Belgrade. The Russian Government was recognized de facto by the Entente countries (Russia's allies in the World War I) and the countries that emerged after the collapse of the European empires: Czechoslovakia, Finland, Poland and the Baltic states.

== End of the government ==
On the eve of the fall of Omsk, on the morning of 10 November 1919, the Council of Ministers fled to Irkutsk by the Trans-Siberian Railway. Here it was cut off from the army and the Supreme Ruler. On 14 November Omsk fell for the communists, the whole frontline was falling apart. Suppressed by the setbacks, Prime Minister Vologodsky resigned, which was accepted on November 21. Pepelyayev was instructed to form a new government, who soon left Irkutsk to Kolchak's headquarters.

Mass uprisings broke out throughout Siberia, Whites relentlessly retreated to the east. In this situation, on 21 December 1919, a workers' uprising broke out in Cheremkhovo, supported in Irkutsk itself on the 24 December. The heading of the Cabinet was taken over by the Minister of Internal Affairs Alexander Cherven-Vodali. On the 28 December Cherven-Vodali, the Minister of War Khanzhin and the interim Minister of Railways Larionov formed an operational administrative body, the so-called "Trojectory". Due to the passivity of the Czechoslovak Legion, declaring its neutrality, the Trojectory, which did not have the required number of troops at hand, was forced to negotiate with the leaders of the anti-Kolchak uprising. Kolchak, realizing the imminence of his collapse, signed a decree on 4 January 1920 prejudging his abdication in favor of General Denikin, to whom it was planned to transfer power upon his arrival in Verkhneudinsk; power in the East of Russia passed to Ataman Semyonov.

On January 5, power in Irkutsk had passed in the hands of the Political Center led by SRs and Mensheviks. The Russian Government was overthrown. Prime Minister Viktor Pepelyayev was shot together with Alexander Kolchak on 7 February 1920.

== See also ==
- Russian Civil War
- Russian State (1918–1920)
- General Command of the Armed Forces of South Russia
- South Russian Government
- Government of South Russia
