= Mikhail Smirnov (admiral) =

Tsarist Russian Navy admiral

Mikhail Ivanovich Smirnov
- Михаил Иванович Смирнов
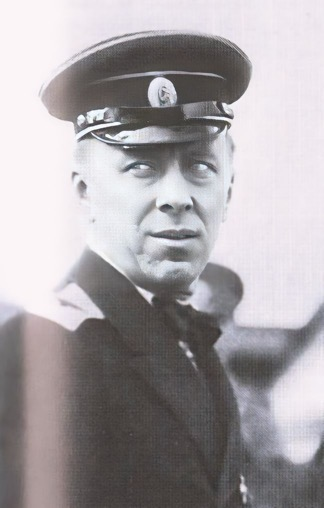
- Mikhail Smirnov in 1919

Minister of Navy of the Russian State
- In office 20 November 1918 – 4 January 1920
- Prime Minister: Pyotr Vologodsky; Viktor Pepelyayev
- Preceded by: Office established (Alexander Kolchak as Minister of War and Navy of the Provisional All-Russian Government)
- Succeeded by: Office abolished

Personal details
- Born: June 18, 1880 Saint Petersburg, Russian Empire
- Died: August 26, 1940 (aged 60) Liversedge, West Yorkshire, England

Military service
- Allegiance: Russian Empire; Russian State
- Branch/service: Imperial Russian Navy
- Years of service: 1896–1920
- Rank: Counter admiral
- Commands: Naval forces of the Russian State
- Battles/wars: Russo-Japanese War; World War I Russian Civil War
- Awards: see awards

Mikhail Ivanovich Smirnov (also spelled Smirnoff; Russian: Михаил Иванович Смирнов; June 18, 1880 – August 26, 1940) was a Russian naval officer, the only Naval Minister of Alexander Kolchak’s Government during the Russian Civil War.

== Early life and military career ==
Mikhail was born in Saint Petersburg on June 18, 1880, into a family of gentry. In 1899, he graduated from the Naval Cadet Corps, his marks being 7th best out of 66, and was appointed midshipman in the Baltic Fleet. In 1900, Smirnov became a junior officer at the staff of the Pacific Squadron. Promoted to lieutenant in December 1903.

== Russo-Japanese War and afterwards ==
In 1904–1905, Smirnov participated in the Russo-Japanese War. Initially he served at the fleet headquarters in Vladivostok, later, from January 1905, aboard the cruiser Rossia. The task assigned was primarily disrupting enemy communications. In 1913, Smirnov published a book on the battle of Tsushima. After the war, in 1906, he was appointed to the Navy General Staff in St Petersburg where he first met Alexander Kolchak and became his close associate. Promoted to Senior lieutenant in December 1908. In this rank, he served aboard the battleships Slava and Panteleimon. Promoted to Captain 2nd Rank in December 1912.

== First World War ==
When the First World War started, Mikhail Smirnov had recently been appointed captain of the destroyer Vynoslivy. In September, however, he was appointed Russia’s representative with the British Royal Navy. In February 1915, he took part in the bombardment of the Dardanelles fortifications by HMS Lord Nelson. Captain of the destroyer Kazanets from April 1915. In July 1916, Smirnov is appointed to the staff of the Black Sea Fleet, where he meets Kolchak once again, and is promoted to Captain 1st rank. Black Sea Fleet Chief of Staff in 1917, he accompanied Admiral Kolchak in his trips to Britain and USA. During 1917–18 Mikhail Smirnov was in the United States, in charge of the Naval section of the Russian Procurement committee.

== Civil War ==
In November 1918, Smirnov returns to Russia, joining Kolchak’s Omsk Government as Minister of the Navy, simultaneously promoted to Counter Admiral. The forces he commanded comprised a river flotilla on the Kama (40 ships in total). The tasks of his force included fire support for the White Army, transportation of its units, laying mines, disrupting Reds' communications and river crossings, as well as engaging Red warships directly. Smirnov displayed notable personal courage and skill, contributing to the actions of the White Army, though he was criticized for maintaining an overstaffed ministry. The fleet was lost after the fall of Perm in July 1919. In October 1919 the Ministry left Omsk for Irkutsk with the rest of the government, and in January 1920 Kolchak was overthrown.

== Emigration ==
In January 1920, Mikhail Smirnov left Russia for China, later moving to Berlin where he chaired a mutual help association for former Russian Navy servicemen. Afterwards, Smirnov lived in the USA, France and Britain. In 1930, he published a biography of Admiral Kolchak. In 1926, he became a Freemason in London. He died in Liversedge, West Yorkshire, where he was buried. Mikhail Smirnov appears as a character in the 2008 Russian biopic of Alexander Kolchak where he is played by Egor Beroev.

== Honours and awards ==
=== Russian Empire ===
- Order of St. Stanislaus, 3rd class (06.12.1902)
- Order of St. Stanislaus, 2nd class (29.03.1909, with swords 31.03.1916)
- Order of St. Anna, 3rd class (06.12.1904. with swords and a bow 18.09.1905)
- Order of St. Anna, 2nd class (28.07.1914) with swords (08.06.1915)
- Order of St. Vladimir, 4th class with swords and a bow (16.03.1915)
- Gold Sword for Bravery (26.08.1916)
- Order of St. Vladimir, 3rd class (06.02.1917)
- Order of St. George, 4th class (27.08.1919)

=== Foreign ===
- France:
  - Ordre du Nichan El-Anouar, Officer (12.06.1906)
  - Order of the Black Star, Officer (11.01.1910)
  - Officer of the Legion of Honour (30.06.1914)
