= State Meeting in Ufa =

1918 conference of White Russian leadership in Ufa, Russia

The State Conference in Ufa (also known as the Ufa State Conference, the Ufa Conference) which took place on September 8–23, 1918, in the city of Ufa in southern Russia (now the capital city of the Republic of Bashkortostan, Russia) was the most representative forum of anti-Bolshevik governments, political parties, Cossack troops, and local governments of eastern Russia.

== Delegations ==
There were 23 delegations (about 200 people) from the Committee of Members of the Constituent Assembly (Samara), the Provisional Siberian Government (Omsk), the Provisional Regional Government of the Urals (Yekaterinburg), the military governments of the Cossack troops (Astrakhan, Yenisei, Irkutsk, Orenburg, Semirechensky, Siberian, and Ural), the governments of a number of national-state entities (the governments of Alash Autonomy, Bashkiria, Autonomous Turkestan, the National Administration of Muslims of the Turkic Tatars of Inner Russia and Siberia, and the Estonian Provisional Government), several all-Russian political parties.

== Result ==
At the meeting, as a result of a forced and extremely unstable compromise of various anti-Bolshevik forces, the Provisional All-Russian Government was formed. The new government assumed the form of a five person Ufa Directory. It included Socialist Revolutionaries Nikolai Avksentiev and Vladimir Zenzinov, Kadet lawyer Vladimir Vinogradov, Siberian Premier Pyotr Vologodsky, and General Vasily Boldyrev. Nikolai Avksentiev was elected Chairman of the Government.

It was established that the Provisional All-Russian Government "until the convocation of the All-Russian Constituent Assembly is the only bearer of supreme power in the entire space of the Russian state". The act provided for "the transfer to the Provisional All-Russian Government, as soon as it requires it", of "all the functions of the supreme power, temporarily transferred, in view of the created conditions, by the regional governments". Thus, the sovereignty of regional entities was abolished, which was replaced by "wide autonomy of regions", the borders of which completely depended on the "wisdom of the Provisional All-Russian Government".

The All-Russian government was supposed to help speed up the convocation of the Constituent Assembly and in the future unconditionally obey it "as the only supreme authority in the country".

The foundations of the national-state system of Russia should be based on federal principles: "the establishment of the emancipating Russia on the basis of the recognition of the rights of wide autonomy for its individual areas, based on both geographical and economic, as well as ethnic characteristics, assuming the final establishment of the state organization on the federative basis by the full powers of the Constituent Assembly..., the recognition of the rights of national minorities not occupying a separate territory to cultural and ethnic self-determination".

=== Act of Ufa ===
With regard to the army, the Act spoke of the need "to recreate a strong, combat-ready, unified Russian army, put outside the influence of political parties" and, at the same time, "the inadmissibility of political organizations of military personnel and the elimination of the army from politics".

The following were identified as urgent tasks to restore state unity and independence of Russia:

1. The struggle for the liberation of Russia from Soviet power;
2. Reunion of the torn away, fallen away and scattered regions of Russia;
3. The non-recognition of Brest and all other treaties of an international character, concluded both on behalf of Russia and its individual parts after the February Revolution, by any authority other than the Russian Provisional Government, and the restoration of the actual force of contractual relations with the Agreement powers;
4. The continuation of the war against the German coalition.

== See also ==
- Provisional All-Russian Government
- Russian State (1918–1920)

== Sources ==
- Ufa State Conference // Russian Historical Archive. Collection 1. Prague, 1929. Pages 57 – 280
- Vladimir Utgof. Ufa State Conference of 1918: From the Memoirs of a Participant // Past. 1921. No. 16. Pages 15 – 41
- Pavel Nazyrov. Ufa State Meeting: Documents and Materials / Pavel Nazyrov, Olga Nikonova // Bulletin of the Chelyabinsk University – 1999 – No. 1 – Pages 127 – 140
- Alexander Kazanchiev. Ufa Directory of 1918 / Alexander Kazanchiev. Ufa: Eastern University, 2003. 116 Pages
- The Act on the Formation of the All-Russian Supreme Power, Adopted at a State Meeting in Ufa
- Vadim Zhuravlev. State Meeting: On the History of the Consolidation of the Anti-Bolshevik Movement in Eastern Russia in July – September, 1918
- An Article in the Great Encyclopedic Dictionary
