= Siberian Republic (1918) =

Siberian short-lived statehood during the Russian Civil War

Siberian Republic Сибирская Республика (Russian) Sibirskaya Respublika
- 1918–1918
- Coat of arms (project)
- Motto: "Through Autonomous Siberia to the Revival of Free Russia"
- Anthem: The Cantata Anthem of Siberia
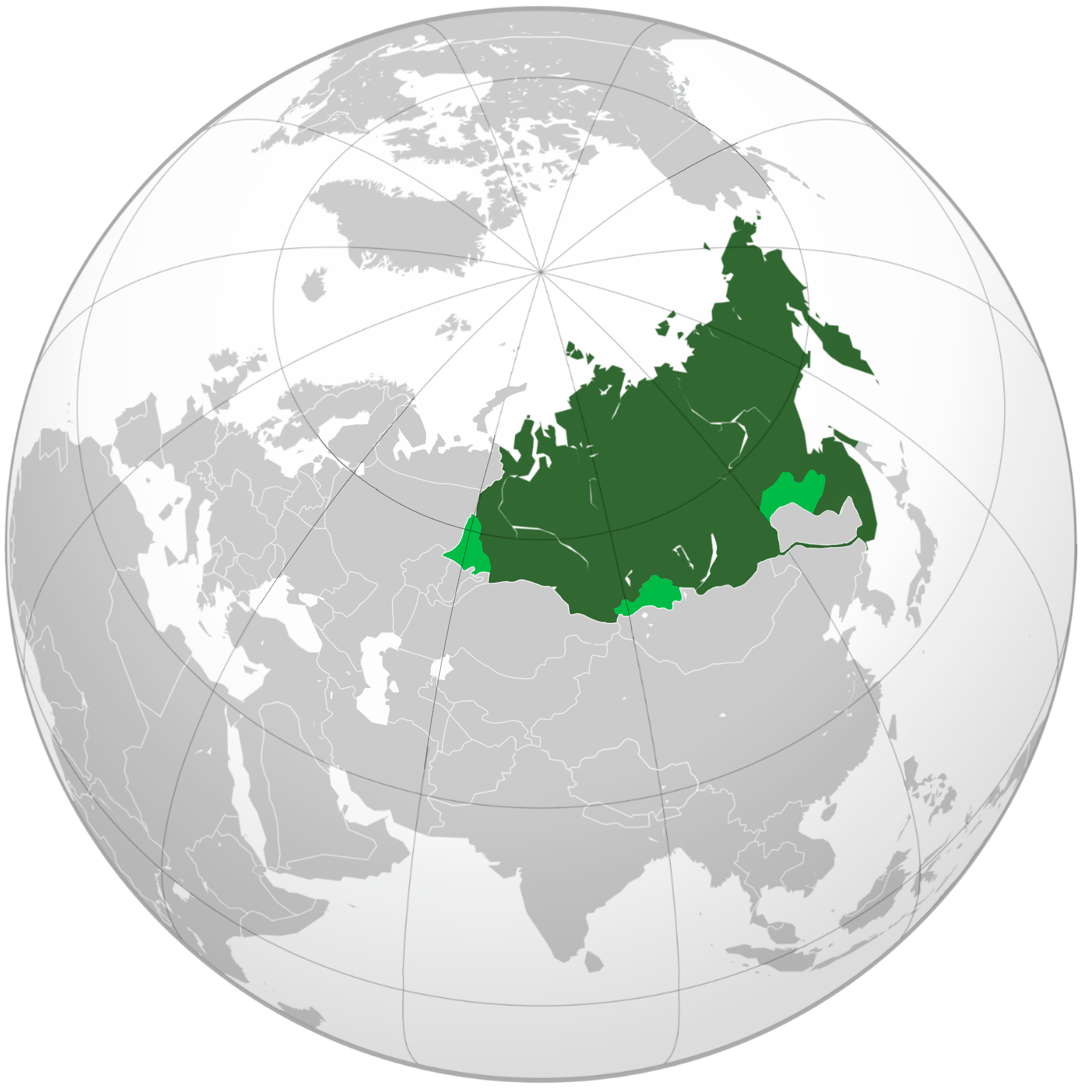
- Status: Unrecognized state; autonomy of the Russian State (since September 23, 1918)
- Capital: Omsk (executive); Tomsk (legislative)
- Common languages: Standard Russian, Siberian dialects, Indigenous languages
- Religion: Secular state
- Demonym: Siberians
- Government: Unitary state; Parliamentary republic (de jure), Directorial system (de facto)
  - Chairman of the Provisional Government: Pyotr Vologodsky
  - Chairman of the Administrative Council: Ivan Serebrennikov
- Legislature: Siberian Regional Duma
- History
  - Established: July 4, 1918
  - Disestablished: November 3, 1918
- Currency: Siberian ruble
Preceded by	Succeeded by
Centrosibir	Russian State
- Today part of: Russia; Kazakhstan; China

The Siberian Republic (Russian: Сибирская Республика, Sibirskaya Respublika; July 4, 1918 – November 3, 1918) was an unrecognized short-lived state that existed on the territory of Russia during the Civil War.

== Background ==
The appearance of the Siberian Republic was the result of many years of struggle by Siberian regionalists for the sovereignty of the region. The ideology of the Siberian Republic was Siberian regionalism (supporters, who occupied the majority of ministerial posts in the government of the new state).

== History of the Republic ==
Executive power belonged to the Provisional Siberian Government, which was located in Omsk, legislative power belonged to the Siberian Regional Duma. The basis of the armed forces was the Siberian Army, which consisted of several tens of thousands of people.

On July 4, 1918, in Omsk, the Provisional Siberian Government, headed by Pyotr Vologodsky, adopted the "Declaration of Independence of Siberia", canceled on November 3, 1918.

Inside the Siberian Republic, there was a struggle between the liberal wing (Provisional Siberian Government) and the socialist wing of regionalism (Siberian Regional Duma), which ended in the fall of 1918 with the dissolution of the Siberian Regional Duma. The consequences of the conflict were the crisis of Siberian statehood, the collapse of the Cabinet of Ministers, the weakening of civilian and strengthening military power, in a series of uprisings. The liberal movement of the oblasts entered into an alliance with the all-Russian political forces and sacrificed the idea of Siberian separatism to consolidate the white forces for an attack on Moscow.

The Siberian Republic was self-liquidated after the formation of the white Russian state and the Provisional All-Russian Government on September 23, 1918, got control over Siberia in accordance with the declaration of November 3, 1918.

== Leadership ==
=== Head of state ===
Name	Office	Start of authority	End of authority
Pyotr Vologodsky	Chairman of the Provisional Siberian Government	June 30, 1918	November 3, 1918

=== Heads of government ===
Name	Office	Start of authority	End of authority
Pyotr Derber	Chairman of the Council of Ministers	January 29, 1918	July 21, 1918
Ivan Lavrov	Chairman of the Council of Ministers	July 21, 1918	October 22, 1918

== Literature ==
- Гинс, Г. К. Сибирь, Союзники и Колчак. Пекин: Общество Возрождения России., 1921. — Том 1, Том 2.; Москва: Айрис-Пресс, 2008. ISBN 978-5-8112-3010-5
- "Declaration of the Provisional Siberian Government on the state independence of Siberia" Декларация Временного Сибирского Правительства о государственной самостоятельности Сибири. Provisional Siberian Government. July 4, 1918.
- Сушко, А. В. [Sushko, Valentina] (June 2009). Сибирский национализм и борьба за власть в крае (март 1917 — ноябрь 1918 г.) [Siberian nationalism and the struggle for power in the region (March 1917 – November 1918)] (PDF). Вестник Томского государственного университета [ Tomsk State University Bulletin] (in Russian). 323: 174–179. ISSN 1561-7793.
- Сушко, А. В. (2010). Процессы суверенизации в Сибири (февраль 1917—1923 гг.) : Дисс. … д-ра ист. наук : 07.00.02 (Thesis). Омск. — § 4.1. Образование сибирской государственности и её ликвидация.
- Гордеев, О. Ф. (2003). Аграрная политика временных государственных образований в Сибири в годы гражданской войны (Конец 1917–1920 гг.) : Дисс. … д-ра ист. наук : 07.00.02. Красноярск. — РГБ ОД, 71:04-7/61.
- Никитин, А. Н. (2007). Государственность «белой» России: становление, эволюция, крушение (1918–1920 гг.): Автореферат дисс. … д-ра юрид. наук : 12.00.01. Москва: Московский университет МВД России.
- Лончаков, Ю. Г. (1997). Аграрная политика временных государственных обрагований на территории Сибири (1918 −1919 гг.) Дисс…. канд. ист. наук. Новосибирск.
- Шиловский, М. В. (1994). Хроника областнического движения в Сибири (1852–1919) (Материалы к хронике общественного движения в Сибири в 1895–1917 гг. ed.). Томск. pp. 6–16. Сайт Томской областной универсальной научной библиотеки им. А. С. Пушкина (oblastnichestvo.lib.tomsk.ru)
- Комарицын, С. Комарицын Сергей. Сибирская весна // Сайт муниципальной газеты Красноярска «Городские Новости» (gornovosti.ru), July 12, 2013. — № 2801..
