= Russian State (1918–1920) =

White Russian political entity during the Russian Civil War

Russian State Россійское Государство
- 1918–1920
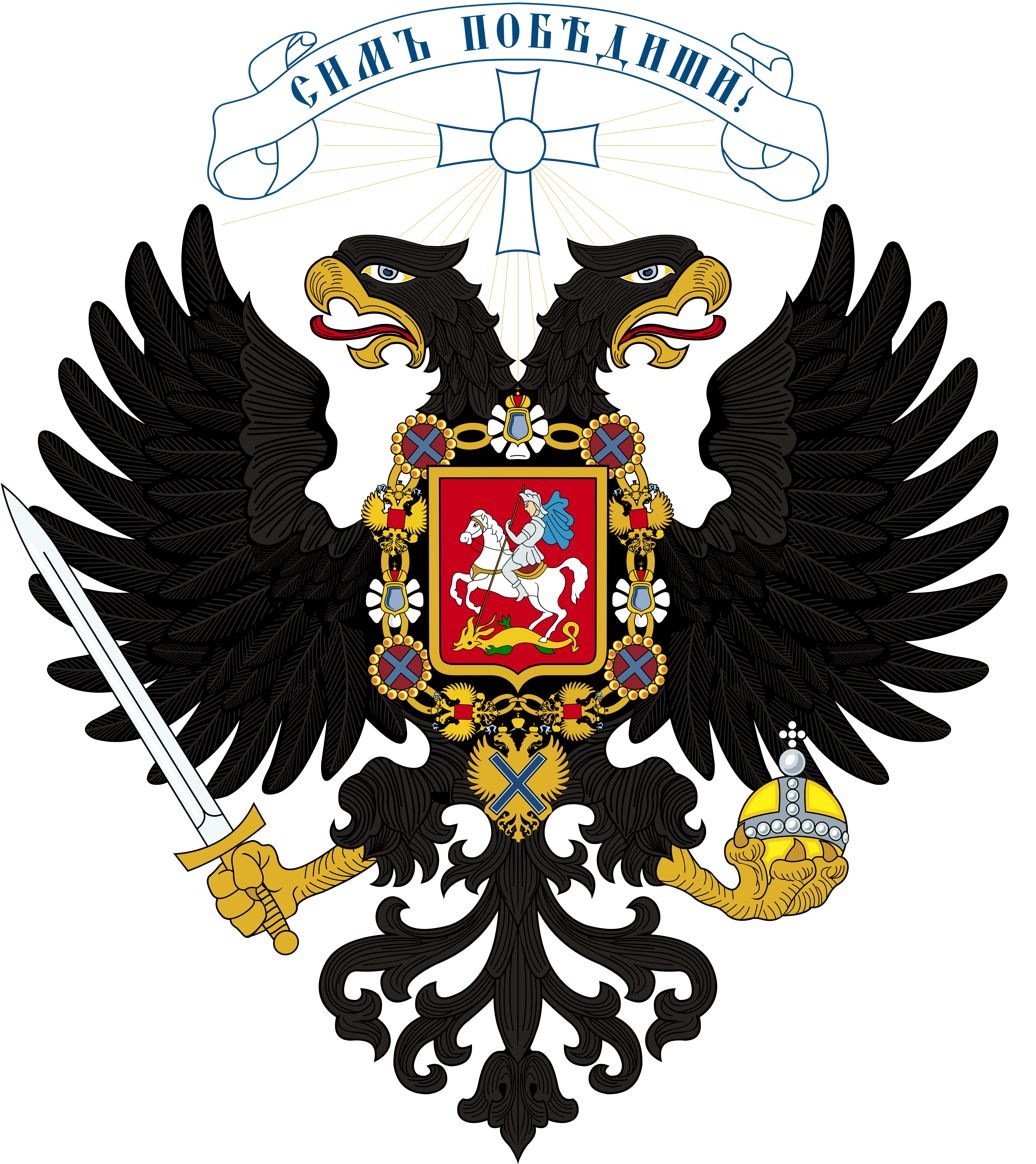
- Flag Coat of arms
- Motto: Симъ побѣдиши! Simŭ pobědiši! "By this sign, conquer!"
- Anthem: Коль славенъ Kol' slaven "How glorious!"
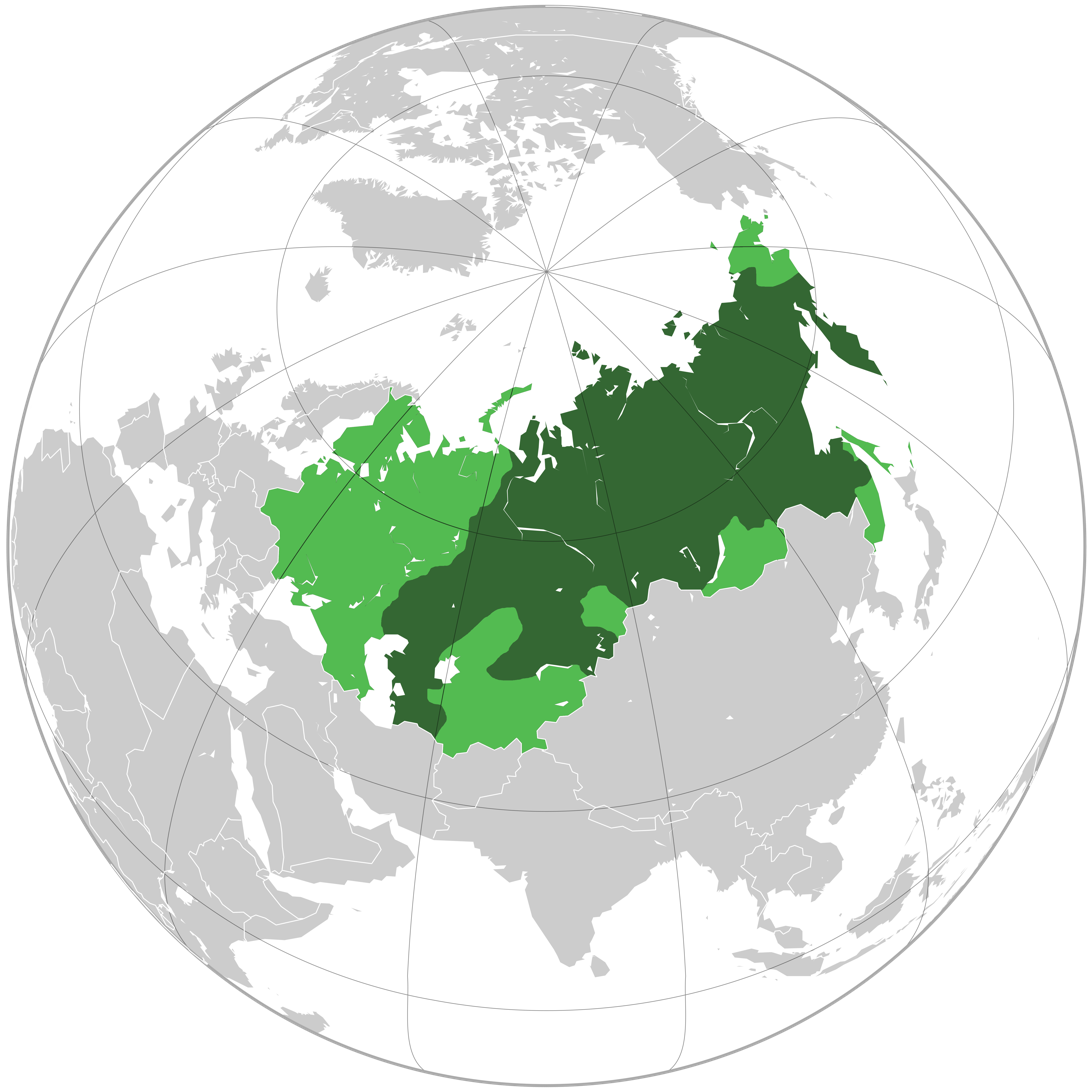
- Maximum extent (Jan 1919); Claimed territories (Note: There were no consensual territorial claims made by the Russian State nor the White movement overall, but throughout the Civil War it didn't formally recognize any of the newly established independent nations of the former Russian Empire.)
- Capital: Petrograd (de jure, never controlled); Ufa (de facto, until 9 October 1918); Omsk (de facto, 1918–20)
- Common languages: Russian
- Religion: Russian Orthodoxy
- Demonym: Russian
- Government: Provisional government: under a military dictatorship (after Nov. 18, 1918)
- Chairman of PA-RG
  - 1918: Nikolai Avksentiev
- Supreme Ruler
  - 1918–1920: Alexander Kolchak
  - 1920: Anton Denikin (acting, de facto)
- Prime Minister
  - 1918–1919: Pyotr Vologodsky
  - 1919–1920: Viktor Pepelyayev
- Legislature: Provisional All-Russian Government (1918); Russian Government (1918–1920)
- History
  - Proclaimed: 23 September 1918
  - Kolchak Coup: 18 November 1918
  - Fall of the State: 7 February 1920
- Currency: Ruble, Yen
Preceded by
Committee of Members of the Constituent Assembly
Provisional Siberian Government of Omsk
Provisional Government of Autonomous Siberia
Provisional Regional Government of the Urals
Supreme Administration of the Northern Region
Orenburg Cossacks
Ural Cossacks
Succeeded by
Russian SFSR
Eastern Okraina
- Today part of: Russia; Kazakhstan

The Russian State, (Note: Russian: Россійское Государство, Rossiyskoye Gosudarstvo or Государство Россійское, Gosudarstvo Rossiyskoye) East Russia or just Russia was the White Army anti-Bolshevik Russian state proclaimed by the Act of the Ufa State Conference of 23 September 1918 (the Constitution of the Provisional All-Russian Government), "On the formation of the all-Russian supreme power" in the name of "restoring state unity and independence of Russia" affected by the revolutionary events of 1917, the October Revolution and the signing of the treaty of Brest-Litovsk with Germany.

== Ufa State Conference act ==
The delegations from Committee of Members of the Constituent Assembly, the Provisional Siberian Government, the Provisional Regional Government of the Urals, Cossack Troops governments, governments of a number of national-state entities, several all-Russian political parties that were present at the meeting formed the Provisional All-Russian Government (the so-called “Ufa Directory”), which was headed by Nikolai Avksentiev. It was found that the Provisional All-Russian Government "until the convening of the All-Russian Constituent Assembly is the sole bearer of the supreme power in the whole space of the Russian state". The act provided for “the transfer to the Provisional All-Russian Government, as soon as it requires it,” “all the functions of the supreme power.” Thus, the sovereignty of regional entities was abolished, which was replaced by the “wide autonomy of the regions”, the limits of which were completely dependent on the “wisdom of the Provisional All-Russian Government”.

The All-Russian government was charged with helping to speed up the convocation of the Constituent Assembly and subsequently unconditionally submit to it "as the only supreme power in the country".

The fundamentals of the national-state structure of Russia should have proceeded from federal principles: “the organization of liberating Russia on the basis of recognition of its individual areas of the rights of broad autonomy, due to both geographical and economic, and ethnic characteristics, suggesting the final establishment of a federal organization on federal principles by the full Constituent Assembly ..., recognition for national minorities that do not occupy a separate territory, the rights to cultural-national self definition.

With regard to the Russian Army, the Act spoke of the need to “re-create a strong, combat-ready, unified Russian army, delivered outside the influence of political parties” and, at the same time, “the inadmissibility of the political organizations of servicemen and the elimination of the army from politics”.

The following tasks were identified as urgent tasks for restoring state unity and independence of Russia:

1. The struggle for the liberation of Russia from Soviet power;
2. The reunification of the rejected, fallen and scattered regions of Russia;
3. The non-recognition of Brest and all other treaties of an international character, concluded both on behalf of Russia and its separate parts after the February Revolution, by any authority other than the Russian Provisional Government, and the restoration of the actual strength of the treaty relations with the powers of accord;
4. Continuation of the war against the Central Powers.

== Centralization of management ==
On 9 October 1918, the Provisional All-Russian Government moved from Ufa to Omsk in connection with the approach of the Red Army to Ufa.

On 4 November, the Provisional All-Russian Government appealed to all regional governments with a request to immediately dissolve “all without exception Regional Governments and Regional Representative Institutions” and to transfer all powers to manage the All-Russian Government. On the same day, on the basis of the ministries and central administrations of the Provisional Siberian Government, the executive body of the Directory was formed - the All-Russian Council of Ministers, headed by Pyotr Vologdsky. Such centralization of state power was due to the need, first of all, to “recreate the combat power of the motherland, so necessary in the struggle for the revival of Great and United Russia”, “to create the conditions necessary for supplying the army and organizing the rear on an All-Russia scale”.

Thanks to this, it was possible to achieve the abolition of all regional, national, and Cossack governments in the east of Russia and thereby consolidate the forces of anti-Bolshevik resistance.

== The 18 November coup ==
On 18 November 1918, the members of the Directory who were in Omsk were arrested, the Council of Ministers announced the assumption of full supreme power and then decided to transfer it to one person, conferring on him the title of Supreme Leader. Admiral Alexander Kolchak was elected by secret ballot to members of the Council of Ministers for this post. The admiral accepted the offer and announced the assumption of the rank of Supreme Commander. A new Russian government was formed, which went down in history as Omsk government, or the Kolchak government, which existed until 4 January 1920.

All commanders of the White armies in the south and west of Russia as well as in Siberia and the Far East recognized the supreme ruler of Admiral Kolchak; at the turn of May–June 1919, the generals Anton Denikin, Yevgeny Miller, Nikolai Yudenich voluntarily submitted to Alexander Kolchak and officially recognized his Supreme Command over all armies in Russia. The Supreme Commander at the same time confirmed the powers of commanders. By order of the supreme leader Miller and Yudenich received the status of governor-general.

From this point on, the Armed Forces of South Russia, the Northwestern Army, the Northern Army and the Eastern Front acted on the fronts of this united army.

The name “Russian Army” was approved as the unification of all the white fronts, the status of the front commanders formally from the commander-in-chief was given to the commanders of the Northern and North-Western armies generals Yudenich and Miller.

Alexander Kolchak continued the economic and political course of the Provisional Siberian Government, the former head of which - Pyotr Vologodsky, who became for the supreme ruler a symbol of the legitimacy of his rule, was left as chairman of the Council of Ministers. In the very first statements after the "18 November coup", both the Russian government, the supreme leader himself, and the white rulers and governments of other Russian regions that recognized his authority confirmed the need to convene a National Constituent Assembly, which was to become a truly unifying center, without any participation of "Revolutionary radicals". For this, a new electoral law was developed.

== State symbols ==
=== Anthem ===
On 19 November 1918, the Council of Ministers adopted a resolution at the suggestion of the Minister of Foreign Affairs Yury Klyuchnikov to consider the oldest spiritual anthem of the Russian Empire, How Glorious Is Our Lord in Zion, to be the national anthem of Russia. The rules of the anthem repeated the order of the hymn God Save the Tsar!.

=== Coat of arms ===
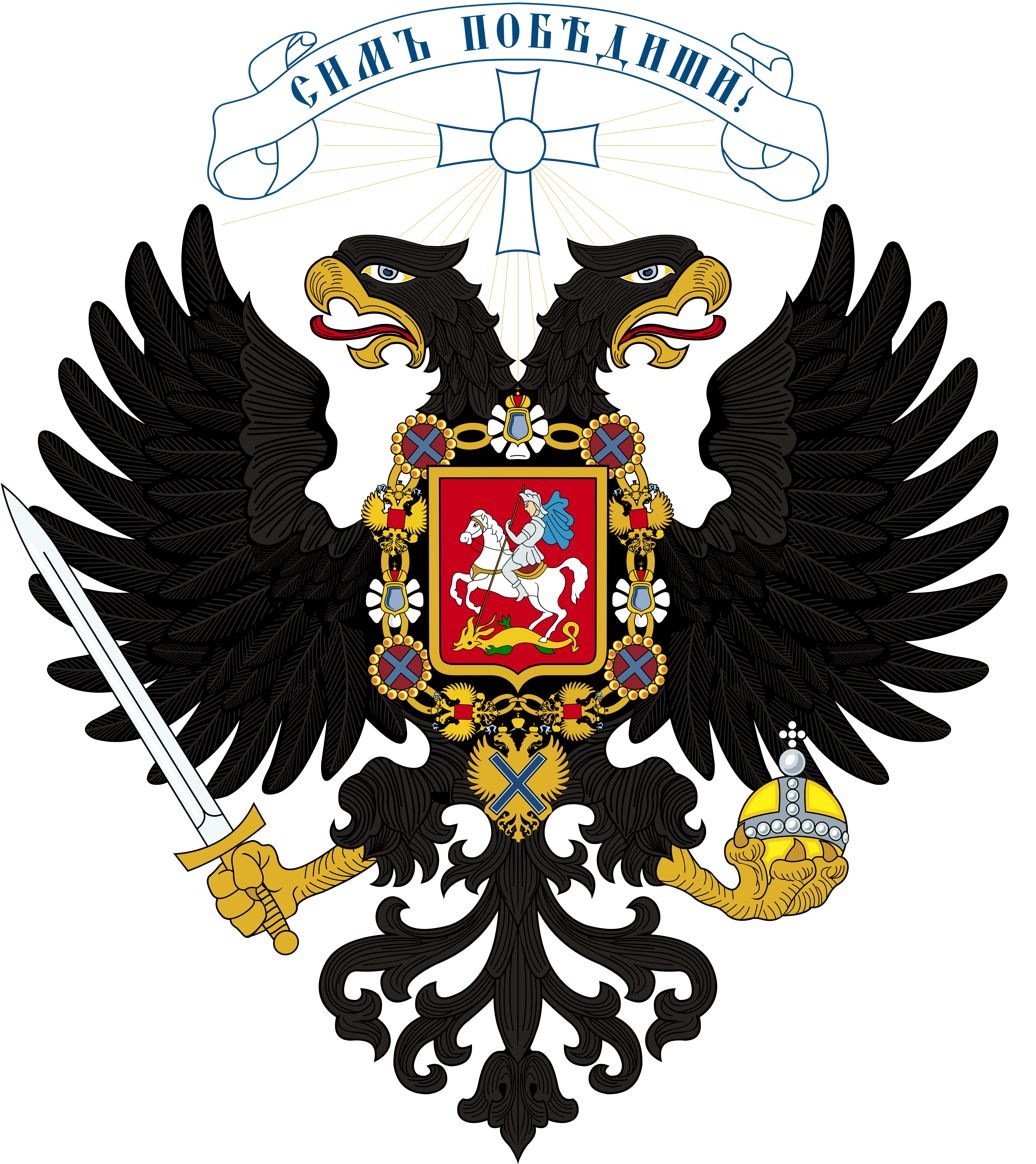
A rendition of the state emblem, 1918

In January–April 1919, in Omsk, on the initiative of the Society of Artists and Fine Art Lovers of the Steppe Territory, competitions were held to create a new text of the national anthem and a new state coat of arms. It was announced that, under the terms of the competition, the state coat of arms, “preserving the image of the two-headed eagle, should be compiled in more artistic forms, in the basics of the ancient Russian style, and should correspond to the modern understanding of decorativeness”, and “instead of the removed emblems of the tsarist era (crowns, scepter and powers) the coat of arms should be decorated with emblems characteristic of the new reviving statehood".

During the competition, 210 versions of the text of the anthem and 97 projects of the State coat of arms were proposed. The most likely contender for victory was considered a project created by an artist from Kazan, Gleb Ilyin, a two-headed eagle, above which stood a cross with the motto “In this, conquer!”. The regional coats of arms of the Russian Empire were removed from the wings of the eagle, but the Moscow arms with Saint George was kept, the crowns were also removed, and the scepter was replaced by the sword. Although none of the submitted projects of the coat of arms was finally approved by the jury, the submission of Gleb Ilyin was often shown on stationery stamps, on the pages of the Siberian press, and was used on banknotes.

On 9 May 1919, the decree of the Council of Ministers of the Russian government approved the symbolism of the Supreme leader is a flag and a pennant with a double-headed eagle, but without signs of “imperial” authority.

=== State awards ===
Simultaneously with the competition for a new anthem and emblem, a competition was held for new State Orders - “Revival of Russia” and “Liberation of Siberia”. The submitted drafts Order of the Revival of Russia did not receive the approval of the jury. Only the draft of the Order of the Liberation of Siberia, approved by the same Gleb Ilyin, was approved.

The main reason for the lack of competition results was considered the “ideological inopportunity” of such events. As a jury member, writer Sergei Auslender, recalled: “The main content of the overwhelming majority of projects was the idea of“ Russia on the march ”, which, of course, did not correspond to the task set - to create the sovereign symbolism of the updated Russian state”. The jury also expressed doubts about the lack of monarchical symbolism in the submitted projects, which went against the principle of “non-denial” declared by the white government.

== State-political structure ==
The state consisted of three separate parts, only the Omsk and Arkhangelsk governments for some time were able to connect their territories.

Laws that were passed in Omsk became binding for all territories of the Russian State.

The Omsk government provided financial assistance to the South. To address the issue of lack of bread, Miller's northern government made purchases in Siberia.

The structure of government consisted of temporary government bodies. These authorities were limited to the duration of the wartime and the restoration of the full order in the country.

=== Government ===
The Supreme Leader was the sole head of state, with full supreme legislative, executive and judicial powers. According to the position, he was the Supreme Commander of all land and sea armed forces of Russia. The only person holding this post was Admiral Alexander Kolchak. On 4 January 1920, he signed his last decree, in which he announced his intention to transfer the powers of the “Supreme All-Russian Power” to Anton Denikin. Pending receipt of instructions from Anton Denikin, "the full military and civilian authority throughout the Russian Eastern Fringe" was provided to Lieutenant General Grigory Semyonov. Anton Denikin did not officially enter this position, although he actually performed it.

The Council of Ministers was the highest legislative and executive authority of the Russian state, the guarantor of the supreme power of the head of state.

Composition:

Portfolio	Minister	Took office	Left office
Prime Minister	Pyotr Vologodsky	18 November 1918	21 November 1919
Prime Minister	Viktor Pepelyayev	22 November 1919	5 January 1920
Minister of Internal Affairs	Alexander Gattenberger	18 November 1918	29 April 1919
Minister of Internal Affairs	Viktor Pepelyayev	May 1919	22 November 1919
Minister of Internal Affairs	Alexander Cherven-Vodali	22 November 1919	4 January 1920
Minister of Foreign Affairs	Yuri Klyuchnikov	18 November 1918	December 1918
Minister of Foreign Affairs	Ivan Sukin	December 1918	3 December 1919
Minister of Foreign Affairs	Sergey Tretyakov	3 December 1919	4 January 1920
Minister of Finance	Ivan Mikhailov	18 November 1918	16 August 1919
Minister of Finance	Lev Hoyer	16 August 1919	3 December 1919
Minister of Finance	Pavel Buryshkin	3 December 1919	4 January 1920
Minister of Justice	Sergei Starynkevich	18 November 1918	2 May 1919
Minister of Justice	Georgy Telberg	16 August 1919	29 November 1919
Minister of Justice	Alexander Morozov	29 November 1919	4 January 1920
Minister of War	Nikolay Stepanov	18 November 1918	23 May 1919
Minister of War	Dmitry Lebedev	23 May 1919	10 August 1919
Minister of War	Mikhail Diterikhs	10 August 1919	27 August 1919
Minister of War	Alexei von Budberg	27 August 1919	5 October 1919
Minister of War	Mikhail Khanzhin	5 October 1919	4 January 1920
Minister of Navy	Mikhail Smirnov	20 November 1918	4 January 1920
Minister of Labour	Leonid Shumilovsky	18 November 1918	4 January 1920
Minister of Agriculture	Nikolay Petrov	18 November 1918	4 January 1920
Minister of Railways	Leonid Ustrugov	18 November 1918	13 November 1919
Minister of Railways	Alexei Larionov	13 November 1919	4 January 1920
Minister of Education	Vasily Sapozhnikov	18 November 1918	2 May 1919
Minister of Education	Pavel Preobrazhensky	6 May 1919	4 January 1920
Minister of Trade and Industry	Nikolay Shchukin	18 November 1918	6 May 1919
Minister of Trade and Industry	Ivan Mikhaylov	6 May 1919	16 August 1919
Minister of Trade and Industry	Sergey Tretyakov	September 1919	November 1919
Minister of Trade and Industry	Alexander Okorokov	29 November 1919	4 January
Minister of Supplies	Ivan Serebrennikov	18 November 1918	27 December 1918
Minister of Food and Supplies	Nikolay Zefirov	27 December 1918	1919
Minister of Food and Supplies	Konstantin Neklyutin	1919	4 January 1920
State Controller	Grigory Krasnov	18 November 1918	4 January 1920
Chief of Staff	Georgy Telberg	18 November 1918	16 August 1919
Chief of Staff	Georgy Gins	16 August 1919	4 January 1920

The Council of the Supreme Leader was an advisory and advisory body on the most important state issues under the Supreme leader of the Russian State.

Composition:

- Supreme Leader – led the position;
- Chairman of the Council of Ministers - by appointment;
- Minister of Finance – by position;
- Minister of the Interior – by position;
- Minister of Foreign Affairs – by position;
- Head of the Supreme Governor and the Council of Ministers;
- Advisor to the Supreme Leader – any person appointed at the discretion of the Supreme leader.

The Emergency State Economic Meeting was a consultative body on economic issues at the Council of Ministers. Performed the functions of "industrial-cooperative" representation. It existed in the original composition until 2 May 1919.

Composition:

- Chairman of the State Emergency Economic Meeting – Sergey Fedosyev;
- Minister of Finance;
- Minister of War;
- Minister of Food and Supply;
- Minister of Commerce and Industry;
- Minister of Railways;
- State Comptroller of the Supreme Ruler;
- Three representatives of private and cooperative banks;
- Five representatives of the All-Russian Council of Congresses of Trade and Industry;
- Three representatives of the Council of Cooperative Congresses.

The State Economic Meeting was a special advisory body on major economic issues under the Council of Ministers, established on May 2, 1919, by transforming the Extraordinary State Economic Meeting. Developed projects to improve economic policy, which were subsequently submitted to the Supreme Governor for review and approval.

Composition:

- Chairman of the State Economic Meeting – George Hins;
- Ministers;
- Representatives of private and cooperative banks;
- Representatives of the All-Russian Council of Congresses of Trade and Industry;
- Representatives of Zemsky assemblies and city councils;
- Representatives of the Cossack troops.

The Committee of the Council of Ministers on the Observance of Law and Order in Management was the control and deliberative body of the Council of Ministers, which has supervised control functions in the area of compliance with the law and the rules of order.

The Office of the Supreme Leader was a state body that performed functions in order to ensure the activities of the Supreme Leader as head of state in the exercise of supreme state power.

- The Director of the Office of the Supreme Governor was Major General Martynov.

== Economics and finance ==
Alexander Kolchak had Russia's gold reserves in the form of gold coins and ingots, as well as jewelry, platinum, silver and securities, captured by the People's Army of the Committee of Members of the Constituent Assembly in Kazan in August 1918 and later transported to Omsk. Gold reserves were estimated at 650 million rubles in gold at the pre-war rate. The government of Kolchak spent 240 million gold rubles for the payment of the tsar's debts and for the supply of the allies. It was impossible to do without these supplies, because in an atmosphere of economic chaos during the Civil War, industrial enterprises reduced production several times.

== Foreign policy ==
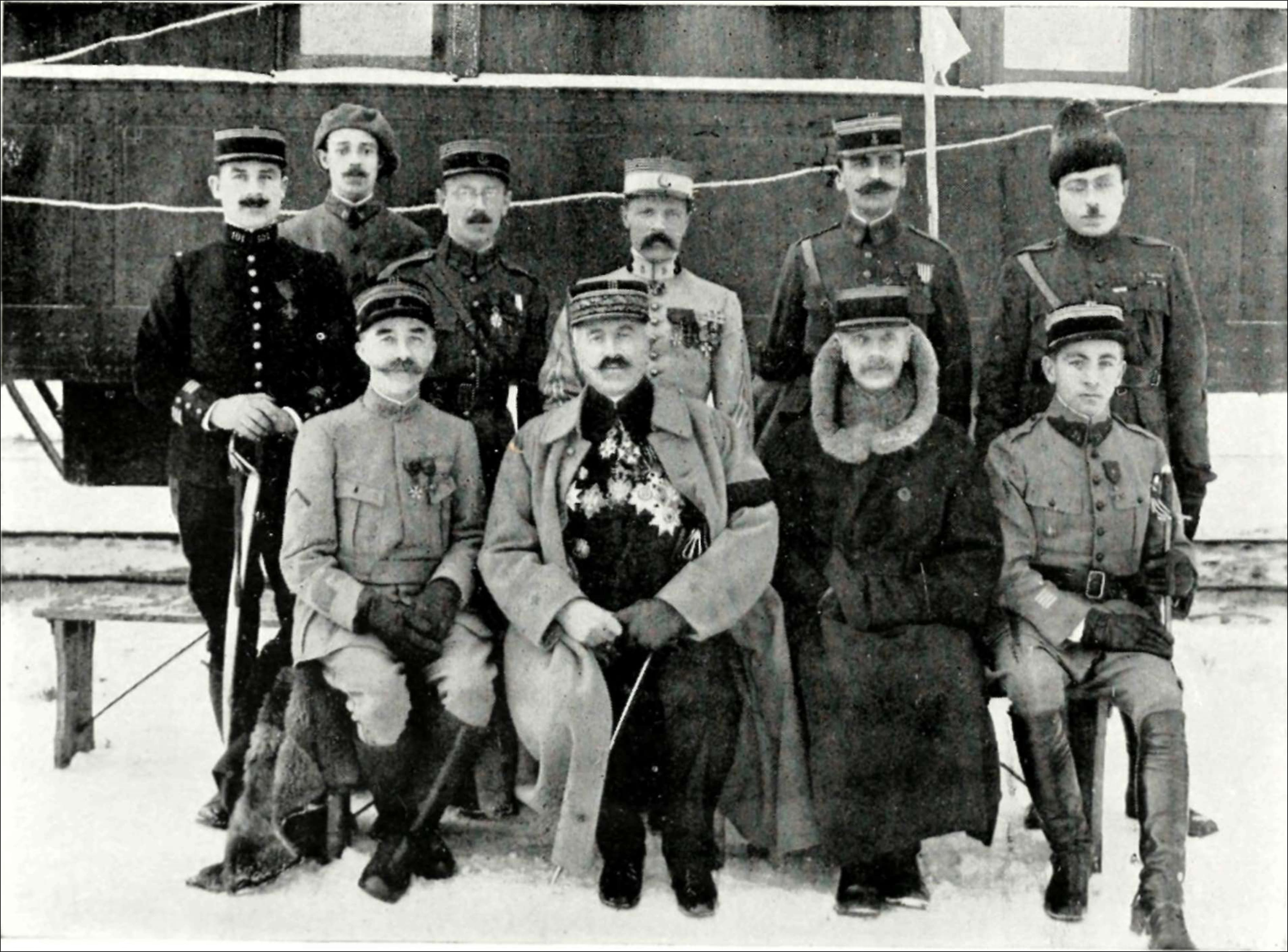
French general Maurice Janin and his Siberian staff

In foreign policy, Alexander Kolchak steadily adhered to the orientation on Russia's former allies in the First World War. As the Supreme ruler and successor to the pre-October Russian governments (tsarist and interim) in a declaration of 21 November 1918, he recognized their external debts and other contractual obligations (by the end of 1917, Russia's foreign debt exceeded 12 billion rubles).

The chief representative of the white governments abroad was the former tsarist foreign minister, an experienced diplomat Sergey Sazonov, who was in Paris. All Russian embassies abroad, remaining from the pre-revolution period, submitted to him, retaining their apparatus, property and functions.

The Russian state was de jure recognized internationally by only one state: the Kingdom of Serbs, Croats and Slovenes. At the end of June 1919, Chargé d'affaires of the Yugoslav Foreign Ministry Jovan Milanković arrived in Omsk. Vasily Strandman was appointed Ambassador in Belgrade.

The Russian state was de facto recognized by the countries of the Entente and the countries that emerged after the collapse of European empires: Czechoslovakia, Finland, Poland, and the Baltic Limitrophe states.

The declaration of the All-Russian Government of 7 December 1918, on the end of world war expressed the hope of Russia's participation in the Paris Peace Conference. The government created a special commission at its Foreign Ministry to prepare for a peace conference in the hope that Russia will be represented at Versailles as a great country that suffered huge losses and for three years held a second front, without which the final victory of the Allies would be impossible. This was assured by Russia, in particular, by the head of the French military mission, General Maurice Janin, speaking on his arrival in Vladivostok in November 1918. It was assumed that if prior to the convening of the conference, the new Russia's government is not legally recognized by the allies, then any of the diplomats of old Russia will represent its interests in agreement with the white governments. However, the position of the allies in this matter soon changed. The decisive argument was the absence of a legally recognized government of all Russia.

As a result, the conference decided: to postpone consideration of the question of Russia, its international status and borders until the end of the Civil War, when a single government will be established throughout its entire territory, and then convene a special international conference on all issues related to it.

In January 1919, U.S. President Woodrow Wilson and British Prime Minister David Lloyd George launched an initiative to convene a special international conference on the Russian question on the Princes Islands, to which representatives of both opposing sides were invited: the Bolsheviks and the whites. The Soviet government responded to this proposal. Among whites, however, the proposal of the Allies to negotiate with the Bolsheviks caused a wave of indignation. Kolchak and Denikin refused to send their representatives to the Princes' Islands.

== Military ==
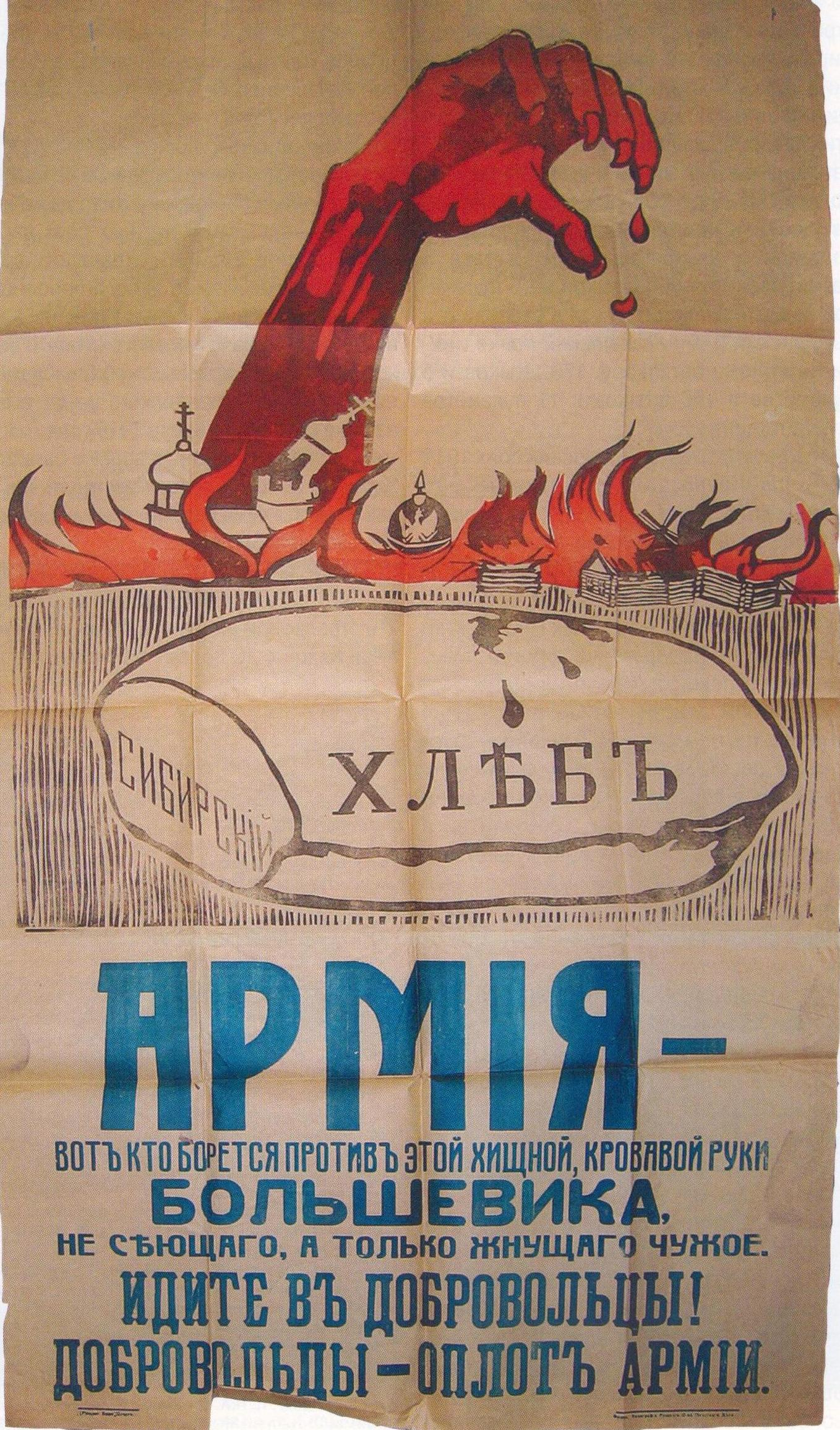
Anti-Bolshevik poster encouraging people to enlist as volunteers

- Russian army
- Orenburg Independent Army
- Czechoslovak Corps

=== September–December 1918 ===
On 28 September 1918, Lieutenant-General Vasily Boldyrev, a member of the Directorate of the General Staff, was appointed commander-in-chief of all land and naval armed forces of Russia and took command of the combined Russian armed units of Eastern Russia (the Siberian army, the Orenburg and Ural Cossack units, the remnants of the People's Army of Komuch and the Czechoslovak Corps).

At first, the unification of the Siberian and People's Armies did not lead to success: the new command could not properly use the available capabilities, and the units of the People's Army left to themselves continued the retreat that began as early as September. 3 October 1918 Syzran was left, 8 October – Samara.

In early October, General Boldyrev reorganized the command of the armed forces of the East of Russia, distributing all the troops subordinate to him on three fronts: Western, South-Western and Siberian. The structure of the Western Front included all Russian and Czechoslovak troops operating against the Soviet troops of the Eastern Front north of the line Nikolaevsk-Buzuluk-Sterlitamak-Verkhneuralsk-Kustanay-Pavlodar. The commander-in-chief of the Czechoslovak Corps, Major General Jan Syrový, was appointed Commander-in-Chief of the Western Front, and General Mikhail Dieterikhs was appointed Chief of Staff of the Front. The front consisted of Russian, Bashkir and Czechoslovak military units in the Urals and in the Volga region: two divisions of the Czechoslovak Corps and the Yekaterinburg group (commanded by Radola Gajda), the Kama group (commanded by lieutenant-general Sergey Lyupov), the Samara group (all groups with rights armies), (commander - colonel (later Major General) Sergei Wojciechowski); Kama military river flotilla (commander - Rear Admiral Mikhail Smirnov). The Ural and Orenburg Cossack troops, as well as regular units operating to the south of this line on the Saratov and Tashkent directions, formed the South-Western Front, led by the ataman of the Orenburg Cossack army, Lieutenant General Alexander Dutov. All anti-Bolshevik troops operating on the territory of Siberia became part of the Siberian Front, whose commander-in-chief was appointed Commander of the Siberian Army, Major General Pavel Ivanov-Rinov.

Due to the transformation of the military ministry of the Provisional Siberian Government into the military and naval ministry of the Provisional All-Russian Government, on 2 November 1918, Pavel Ivanov-Rinov was relieved of his post as governor, but retained the post of commander of the Siberian army.

The reorganization of the management of the anti-Bolshevik armed forces of the East of Russia was completed by Admiral Alexander Kolchak, as Supreme Commander. On 18 December 1918, he ordered the elimination of the corps areas of the Siberian Army and the formation of military districts instead:

- West Siberian with headquarters in Omsk (Tobolsk, Tomsk and Altai provinces, Akmola and Semipalatinsk regions);
- Mid-Siberian with headquarters in Irkutsk (Yenisei and Irkutsk provinces, Yakutsk region);
- Far East with headquarters in Khabarovsk (Amur, Primorsk and Trans-Baikal regions, northern part of Sakhalin Island).

By the same order, Kolchak approved the Orenburg Military District with the headquarters in Orenburg (Orenburg province without Chelyabinsk district and Turgay region), which was formed by the order of the military circle of the Orenburg Cossack army.

In the autumn – winter of 1918, the situation on the front favored Kolchak's plans for uniting disparate anti-Bolshevik forces. On November 29, the Yekaterinburg group of the Siberian Army, having launched a decisive offensive, completely crushed the 3rd Army of the Red Army, took Kungur (21 December) and Perm (24 December), where it took huge trophies.

After the establishment in December 1918 of the headquarters of the Supreme Commander Admiral Kolchak, the Siberian army was disbanded.

On 24 December , a new Siberian army was formed from the Yekaterinburg Group of Forces (as part of the 1st Mid-Siberian Corps, 3rd Steppe Siberian Corps, Votkinsk Division and Krasnoufimsky Brigade), whose temporary command was entrusted to General Radola Gajda. For the formation of the army headquarters, it was proposed to use the headquarters of the former Siberian Army, which should be redeployed from Omsk to Yekaterinburg as soon as possible. General Boris Bogoslovsky, Chief of Staff of the Yekaterinburg Group, was appointed to execute the Chief of Staff of the Siberian Army.

The Western Army, led by General Mikhail Khanzhin, commander of the 3rd Ural Corps, was formed from parts of the Samara and Kama Group of Forces, the 3rd and 6th Ural Corps. Chief of Staff of the Samara Group, General Sergey Schepikhin, was appointed Chief of the Army Staff. On the basis of the troops of the South-Western Front, the Orenburg Separate Army was formed under the command of General Alexander Dutov. The troops of the Siberian Front were reorganized into the 2nd Steppe Siberian Separate Corps of General Vladimir Brzezovsky, which operated on the Semirechensky direction.

=== 1919 ===
In January–February 1919, the reorganized Siberian Army repulsed the Red Army counter-offensive against Perm.

In early March, the Siberian and Western armies launched an offensive.

The Siberian army, advancing on Vyatka and Kazan, in April took Sarapul, Votkinsk and Izhevsk and entered the approaches to Kazan. The Western army occupied Ufa (14 March), Belebey, Birsk, Bugulma (10 April), Buguruslan, and approached Samara. The South Army group of the 4th Army Corps and the Consolidated Sterlitamak Corps, which was attacking Aktobe-Orenburg, which is under its operational subordination, entered the suburbs of Orenburg and together with the Orenburg Cossacks laid siege to the city in late April.

As a result of the general offensive, the whole of the Ural was occupied, and Kolchak's troops came very close to the Volga.

It was at that moment that the strategic miscalculation of the White Army command became obvious: the offensive that developed along concentric divergent directions was stopped by the troops of the Eastern Front of the Red Army, and on April 28 the Southern Group of the Eastern Front of the Red Army launched a counteroffensive against the Western Army. She defeated her near Buguruslan and Belebei and threw her across the White River. At the end of May, the troops of the Western Army were consolidated into the Volga, Ural and Ufa groups. In the battle for Ufa (25 May – 19 June), the Western army was again defeated and retreated to Chelyabinsk.

The Siberian army was forced to stop its offensive and start a withdrawal due to the threat to its left flank. In June, due to the continuing retreat of the Western Army, parts of the Siberian Army were forced to begin a hasty retreat along the entire front and in July they withdrew to the Trans-Urals. Ekaterinburg and Chelyabinsk were left.

On 22 July 1919, the Siberian army was divided into the 1st (on the Tyumen direction) and the 2nd (on the Kurgan direction) Siberian armies, which together with the 3rd army (the former Western army) formed the Eastern Front under the command of General Mikhail Diterikhs .

The southern army group of the Western army did not manage to take Orenburg, and in August, after the beginning of the general retreat of the whites, it also retreated to the east.

The 1st and 2nd Siberian armies successfully participated in the Tobolsk offensive operation (August–October 1919), but after the collapse of the Eastern front, which took place in October–November 1919, their remnants retreated to Transbaikalia, where they continued to fight against the Bolsheviks until November 1920.

=== Relations with allies ===
At first, the governments of Britain and France believed that the whole struggle against the Bolsheviks in Russia should be conducted under Western leadership. General Maurice Janin, the head of the Allied mission, who arrived in Omsk via Vladivostok at the end of 1918, presented a mandate signed by Georges Clemenceau and David Lloyd George, according to which he was authorized to command all the troops in Siberia, both allied and Russian. Alexander Kolchak categorically rejected this mandate, saying that he would rather refuse foreign aid altogether rather than agree to such conditions. After the negotiations, the Allied governments made concessions, and a compromise was reached: Admiral Kolchak remained the Supreme Commander of the Russian troops, and Maurice Janin was appointed by the Kolchak order of 19 January 1919, as the Commander-in-Chief of the Allied forces, that is, the Czechs, as well as the smaller detachments of Serbs, Italians who arrived later, Romanians and Poles. Janin, however, did not forgive Kolchak of his decline in status. The British military mission under Kolchak was headed by General Alfred Knox, who was responsible for supplying the Kolchak army. He, unlike Janin, was loyal to Kolchak and showed a friendly attitude.

The units of the Allied forces were located in the rear. On the front for a short time there were only a small French detachment and an English brigade, in which the rank and file was recruited mainly from the Russians. The Japanese and American troops stationed in the Far East did not submit to Janin. The Japanese kept in the territory from the Pacific Ocean to Transbaikalia a 40-thousand corps (originally even up to 70 thousand military men), the Americans - only 7-thousand brigade.

The main assistance of the British and French allies was reduced to supplying the armies of Kolchak and Denikin with weapons and uniforms. The Czechoslovak Corps, despite the efforts of the Allied representatives, failed to return to the front. After the defeat of Germany and Austria-Hungary in the war, they sought to return home, not wanting to fight in a foreign country for goals they did not understand, especially after the Kolchak coup in Omsk, which the Czechs categorically did not support. With all the ostentatious "friendliness", the relationship between the Russians and the Czechs became increasingly strained. The only thing that the Czechs agreed to under pressure from representatives of the Entente was to carry in the rear security guards of the Trans-Siberian Railway from Novonikolayevsk to Irkutsk.

As for the United States and Japan, they were limited mainly to maintaining political relations with Kolchak and the role of "friendly" observers in the Far East, waiting for the development of the situation, pursuing their economic interests and competing among themselves for the predominant influence in the region. At the same time, the American command was not inclined to actively intervene in Russian affairs, and even essentially hostile to the Kolchak regime because of its "undemocratic" nature and white terror. The Japanese, however, not only intervened, but also actively sought to subjugate the Far East to their influence. In the Far East, due to its remoteness, the small number of Russian troops and the presence of foreign troops, the power of the All-Russian government was almost nominal.

== International legal recognition ==
The Russian state was recognized by the Kingdom of Serbs, Croats and Slovenes (future Yugoslavia). On 19 May 1919, Prime Minister of the Kingdom Stoyan Protić issued an official note that he informed the All-Russian Government that the Kingdom recognized him as the legitimate Russian authority. Russia also recognized this Kingdom. In Omsk, Jovan Milanković was appointed attorney in charge of the Kingdom, and the interests of the Provisional All-Russian Government in Belgrade were represented in 1919 by Vasily Shtrandtman.

== See also ==
- Bibliography of the Russian Revolution and Civil War § Government
- White movement
- Decree on the system of government of Russia (1918)
- Provisional All-Russian Government
- Soviet Russia Constitution of 1918
