= Joseph Vladimirovich Semyonov =

Russian general (1870–1942)

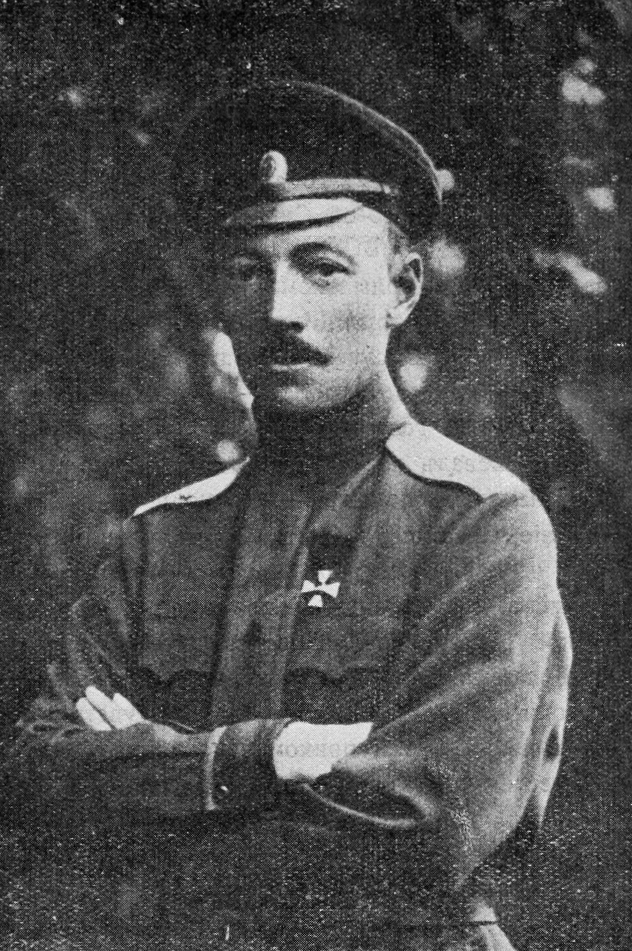
- Native name: Иосиф Владимирович Семёнов
- Born: 3 August [O.S. 22 July] 1870
- Died: 19 January 1942 (aged 71) Belgrade, Serbia
- Allegiance: Russian Empire; Russian State
- Branch: Imperial Russian Army; White Army
- Rank: Major General
- Conflicts: World War I Russian Civil War

Joseph Vladimirovich Semyonov (Russian: Иосиф Владимирович Семёнов; 3 August [O.S. 22 July] 1870 – 19 January 1942), was a Russian major general, commander of the Life Guards of the 3rd Infantry Regiment, and participant in the White movement.

== Biography ==
Semyonov was born on 3 August [O.S. 22 July] 1870. Semyonov's younger brother, Valerian (1875–1928) is also an officer and Knight of St. George.

Semyonov graduated from the 1st Cadet Corps in 1887 and the 1st Pavlovsk Military School in 1889, from where he was released as a second lieutenant in the 2nd Rifle Regiment. Later he was transferred to the Life Guards Reserve Infantry Regiment.

He was promoted to lieutenant on 30 August 1893, and to staff captain on 22 July 1900. In 1900 he graduated from the Nikolaev General Staff Academy, 2nd category, and continued to serve in the guard. Promoted to captain on 6 December 1905. On 5 May 1910, the 4th Infantry Battalion of the Imperial Family was transferred to the Life Guards, and deployed to a regiment the same year. He was promoted to colonel on 6 December 1910.

He joined the ranks of the Imperial Family riflemen during World War I. On 27 March 1915, he was appointed commander of the 134th Feodosia Infantry Regiment. He was Awarded the Order of St. George, 4th Class.

On 27 January 1916, he was promoted to major general “for distinction in affairs against the enemy,” and on 3 February, was appointed brigade commander of the 126th Infantry Division. On 20 August 1916, he was appointed commander of the Life Guards of the 3rd Infantry Regiment. On 25 April 1917, he was appointed commander of the 154th Infantry Division, and on October 10 of the same year, he was appointed commander of the 125th Infantry Division.

During the Russian Civil War, he sided with the White movement. In 1918, he served in the hetman's army; on 27 June 1918, he was appointed to serve as the hetman's liaison with the Austro-Hungarian command in Odessa. From 9 December 1918, he was in the reserve of ranks at the headquarters of the Commander-in-Chief of the Armed Forces of the South of Russia, from 22 January 1919 - in the reserve of ranks at the headquarters of the troops of the South-Western Territory (Odessa). In the summer of 1919, he arrived on the Eastern Front, in the troops of Admiral Kolchak, where from 11 July 1919, he was enrolled in the reserve of General Staff officers under the management of the 1st Quartermaster General of the Supreme Commander-in-Chief Headquarters. In October 1919 - assistant to the commander of the Amur Military District. From 1 June 1921 he was commandant of Vladivostok, from 15 June 1922 - at the disposal of the commander of the troops of the Provisional Amur Government. After the retreat of parts of the Zemstvo army to the territory of China, on 23 October 1922, he was appointed their commandant.

He emigrated to Yugoslavia in exile and lived in Belgrade. He was the chairman of the regimental association of the Life Guards of the 3rd Infantry Regiment. He died 19 January 1942 in Belgrade. He is buried in the New Cemetery.

== Awards ==
- Order of St. Stanislaus, 3rd Class. (VP 6.12.1905)
- Order of St. Anne, 3rd Class. (1910)
- Order of St. Stanislaus, 2nd Class. (1911)
- Order of St. Anne, 2nd Class. (VP 01/22/1913)
- swords for the Order of St. Anne, 2nd Class. (VP 11/26/1914)
- Order of St. Vladimir, 4th Class. with swords and bow (VP 26.11.1914)
- Order of St. Vladimir, 3rd Class. with swords (VP 01/19/1915)
- swords for the Order of St. Stanislaus, 2nd class. (VP 02/12/1915)
- Order of St. Anne, 4th Class. with the inscription “for bravery” (VP 8.04.1915)
- swords and bow for the Order of St. Anne, 3rd class. (VP 07/28/1915)
- The highest favor “for distinction in affairs against the enemy” (VP 1.12.1915)
- Order of St. George, 4th Class. (VP 02/3/1916)
- Order of St. Stanislaus, 1st Class. with swords (VP 6.09.1916)
- Order of St. Anne 1st Class. with swords (VP 10/20/1916)

== Literature ==
- Ганин А. В. Корпус офицеров Генерального штаба в годы Гражданской войны 1917—1922 гг. Справочные материалы. — М., 2009. — С. 335.
- Клепов М. Ю. Офицеры — Георгиевские кавалеры Первой мировой войны. — М.: «Минувшее», 2015.
- "Joseph Vladimirovich Semyonov" (in Russian). «Russian army in a Great war» project.
