= Aleksandr Verkhovsky =

Russian military and political figure (1886–1938)

Aleksandr Verkhovensky
- Александр Верховский
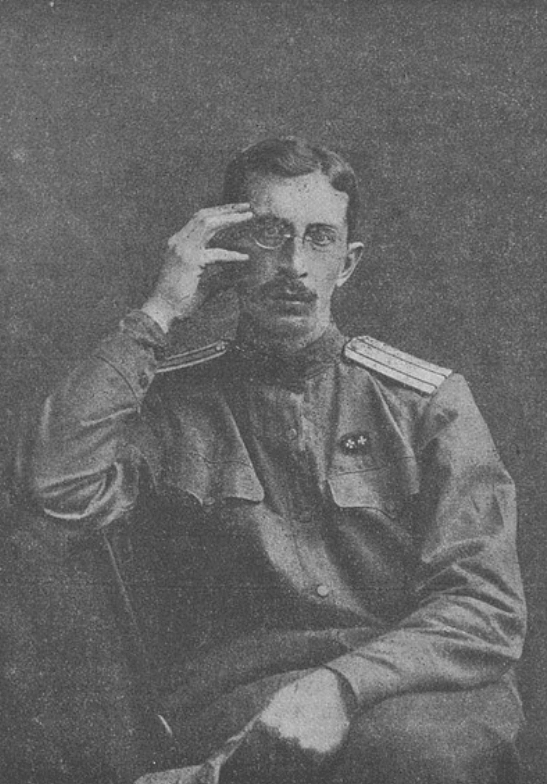
- Verkhovsky in 1917

Minister of War of the Russian Republic
- In office September 14, 1917 – November 8, 1917
- Minister-Chairman: Alexander Kerensky
- Preceded by: Alexander Kerensky (as Minister of War and Navy of the Russian Provisional Government)
- Succeeded by: Office abolished. (Nikolay Podvoisky as Commissar for Military Affairs of the RSFSR)

Personal details
- Born: November 27, 1886 Saint Petersburg, Russian Empire
- Died: August 19, 1938 (51 years old) Kommunarka shooting ground, Moscow, Russian SFSR, Soviet Union
- Party: Socialist Revolutionary
- Education: Page Corps

Military service
- Battles/wars: Russo-Japanese War; World War I

Aleksandr Ivanovich Verkhovsky (Russian: Александр Иванович Верховский; November 27, 1886 – August 19, 1938) was a Russian military and political figure. He was briefly the Minister of War of the Provisional Russian Government in 1917.

== Biography ==
Born into a noble family. He studied at the Page Corps. After the shooting of the demonstration ("Bloody Sunday") on January 9, 1905, he declared that he "considers it a shame to use weapons against an unarmed crowd." He was expelled from the corps and sent to the front of the Russo-Japanese War. For military distinctions he was awarded the Badge of Honor of the Military Order of the 4th degree and promoted to second lieutenant.

=== General Staff Officer ===
From 1905 to 1908, he served in the 3rd Finland Rifle Artillery Division. He graduated from the Imperial Nicholas Military Academy (1911). From 1909 he was lieutenant, from 1911 staff captain, and from 1913 captain. In 1911-1913 he commanded a company in the 2nd Finland Rifle Regiment. Since 1913 - senior adjutant of the headquarters of the 3rd Finland Rifle Brigade. He was sent to Serbia to study the experience of the participation of the Serbian army in the Balkan wars.

=== World War I ===
With the outbreak of World War I, he returned to Russia, along with his brigade he participated in battles in East Prussia. He was awarded the Order of St. George, 4th degree.

After leaving the hospital, he was at staff work. Since September 1916 - Operations Assistant to the Russian representative at the Romanian main apartment. Since December 1916 - assistant flag captain on the ground of the headquarters of the head of the landing of the Black Sea. Since February 1917 - assistant to the chief of staff of a separate Black Sea Naval Division, which was to take part in the Bosphorus landing operation.

=== February Revolution ===
Verkhovsky actively supported the February Revolution. In March 1917 he was elected a member of the Sevastopol Council of Workers' Deputies. He drafted the Regulation on local soldiers' committees adopted on March 30. He supported the efforts of the commander of the Black Sea Fleet, Admiral Kolchak, to maintain order in the army and navy.

At the end of March 1917 he was sent to Petrograd to work in the commission on the revision of statutes and charters in accordance with new legal norms. Then he returned to Sevastopol, where he actively participated in the work of the committees. He joined the Party of Socialist Revolutionaries (SRs).

He was promoted to colonel. Suppressed soldier protests in Nizhny Novgorod, Tver, Vladimir, Lipetsk, Yelets and other cities. Verkhovsky was an opponent of General Kornilov. On his orders, Kornilov's supporters in Moscow were arrested or removed from their posts.

=== Minister of War ===
Since August 30, 1917 - Minister of War of the Provisional Government, September 1, 1917 promoted to major general. In September 1917 he was part of the Directory, which included five ministers led by Alexander Kerensky. He was a supporter of decisive social reforms or a compromise with moderate Bolsheviks. He carried out a partial demobilization, tried to increase the combat effectiveness of the army. Verkhovsky's activity as minister caused sharp criticism from representatives of the generals, including Anton Denikin.

October 18, 1917 at a meeting of the Provisional Government advocated the conclusion of peace with Germany, but did not receive the support of members of the government. Also Verkhovsky was not held in the Provisional Council of the Russian Republic. On October 21, he was fired on a two-week vacation and the next day went to Valaam, where he was during the Bolsheviks' coming to power.

=== Civil War ===
On November 3 (November 16), 1917, he returned to Petrograd. Together with members of the Central Committee of the Socialist Revolutionary Party, he was engaged in anti-Bolshevik activities.

He was briefly arrested. In December 1918 he was released and joined the Red Army, did not long serve as chief of the operational department of the headquarters of the Petrograd Military District. Then he worked in the rear. In 1922, he was a military expert of the Soviet delegation at the Genoese international conference.

=== Military theorist ===
After the civil war, he was engaged in teaching. Since June 1922, he was head of the Military Academy of the Red Army. Head of the Military Academic Courses of the Higher Command of the Red Army, Senior Lecturer of the Military Academy of the Red Army, since 1927 - Professor. The author of a number of works on military theory and history, published in the journal «Military Knowledge».

Arrested on February 2, 1931 as part of the Vesna Case. He was sentenced to 10 years in prison. Defense Minister Kliment Voroshilov sent one of his articles to Joseph Stalin with a proposal to release the author from prison. Verkhovsky was released ahead of time on September 17, 1934. After release, resumed teaching.

=== New arrest and execution ===
March 11, 1938, he was again arrested. Accused of participating in an anti-Soviet military conspiracy, preparing terrorist acts against party and government leaders. One of the “evidence” was the award pistol found at Verkhovsky during a search, which he received in 1916 for his differences in battles with the Germans.

On August 19, 1938 he was sentenced to be shot by the Military Collegium of the Supreme Court. On the same day he was shot and buried at the special facility “Kommunarka” (Moscow Region). He was rehabilitated on November 28, 1956.

== Family ==
First marriage: Lydia Fyodorovna (Friedrichovna), née Veit (1884–1942), daughter of Fyodor (Friedrich) Yulyevich Veit, Doctor of Medicine and physician to the Imperial Academy of Arts from 1885 to 1895, and cousin of the actor A. A. Fait. Their sons were Igor (1908/9–1984), who was arrested in 1934 and later released, and Nikolai (1911–1985).

Second marriage: Natalya Sergeyevna, née Verevkina (1886/7, St. Petersburg–1977/8, Moscow). In September 1938, she was sentenced as a family member of a traitor to the Motherland to eight years in the camps. During her exile settlement, she lived in Dzhezkazgan. After her rehabilitation, she returned to Moscow. She was buried at Vagankovskoye Cemetery next to her father, in the family burial plot.
