= Ivan Serebrennikov =

Russian & Siberian statesman

- Иван Серебренников
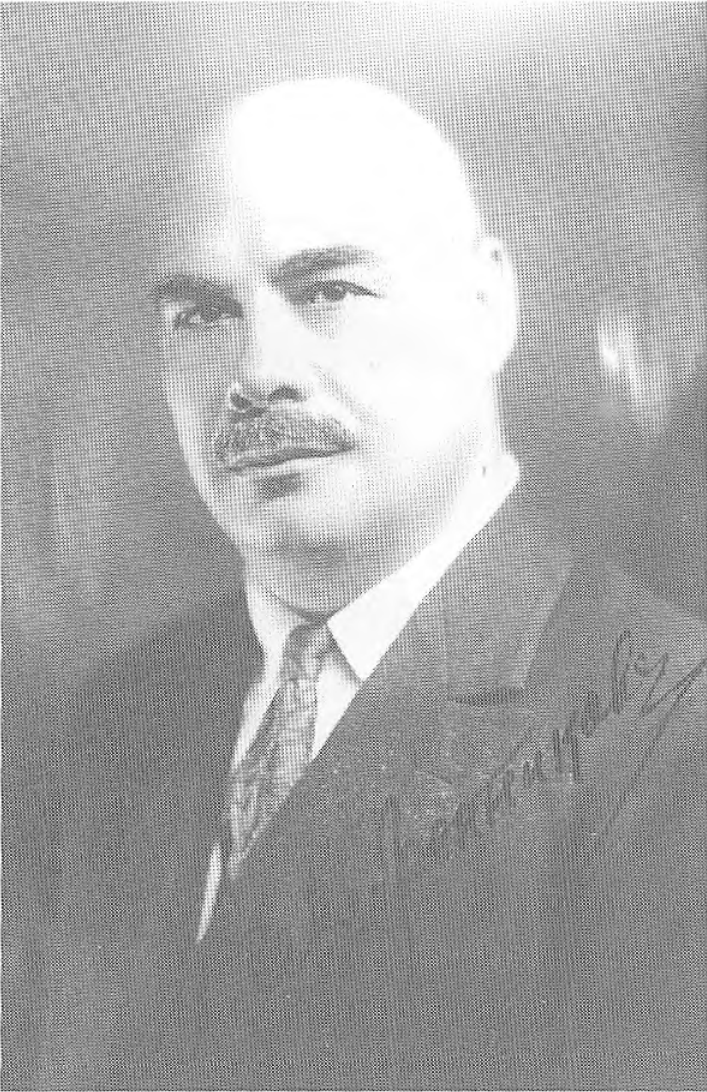
- Ivan Serebrennikov in 1930s

Minister of Supply of the Russian State
- In office 18 November 1918 – 27 December 1918
- Prime Minister: Pyotr Vologodsky
- Preceded by: Office established
- Succeeded by: Office abolished; Nikolay Zefirov (as Minister of Food and Supplies)

Chairman of the Administrative Council of the Siberian Republic
- In office 3 September 1918 – 3 November 1918
- Preceded by: Office established
- Succeeded by: Office abolished

Personal details
- Born: Ivan Innokentyevich Serebrennikov; 26 July [O.S. 14 July] 1882 Znamenskoye, Verkholensky Uyezd, Irkutsk Governorate, Russian Empire (now Znamenka, Zhigalovsky District, Irkutsk Oblast, Russia)
- Died: 19 June 1953 (aged 70) Tianjin, China
- Spouse: Alexandra Nikolayevna

Ivan Innokentyevich Serebrennikov (Russian: Ива́н Инноке́нтьевич Сере́бренников; 14 July 1882 – 19 June 1953) was a Russian statesman and Siberian regionalist. He served as Chairman of the Administrative Council of the Siberian Republic from 3 September to 3 November 1918 and Minister of Supply for the Russian State from 18 November to 27 December 1918.

== Early life ==
Ivan Serebrennikov was born on the 14th of July 1882 in Znamenka, Zhigalovsky District of the Irkutsk Governorate. Serebrennikov received his secondary education in the Irkutsk Classical Gymnasium. On 1 January 1906 he was arrested for participating in an illegal gathering for New Years Day and was sentenced to 3 months in prison. At the end of his sentence, in April 1906, he was expelled from Irkutsk. In the same month he married Alexandra Nikolaevna.

He studied at the Military Medical Academy in St. Petersburg. He then lived in St. Petersburg for several years. He was arrested in St. Petersburg for participating in the activities involving the Socialist-Revolutionary Party leading him to serve six-months of solitary confinement.

== Political activities ==
Serebrennikov returned to Irkutsk in 1911 and by 1913 he had become the secretary of the city council in Irkutsk. In 1914 he became a member of the Irkutsk Committee for the Union of Cities.

During the Russian Civil War, Serebrennikov became Chairman of the Administrative Council for the short-lived Siberian Republic under Pyotr Vologodsky.

After Alexander Kolchak's coup against the Provisional All-Russian Government, Serebrennikov became Minister of Supply.

== Exile ==
After the Bolsheviks took control of Irkutsk in 1920, Serebrennikov was forced to flee to Harbin in China. He arrived in March 1920. He died in Tianjin on 19 June 1953.
