= Gleb Ilyin =

Russian-American painter

Gleb Alexander Ilyin
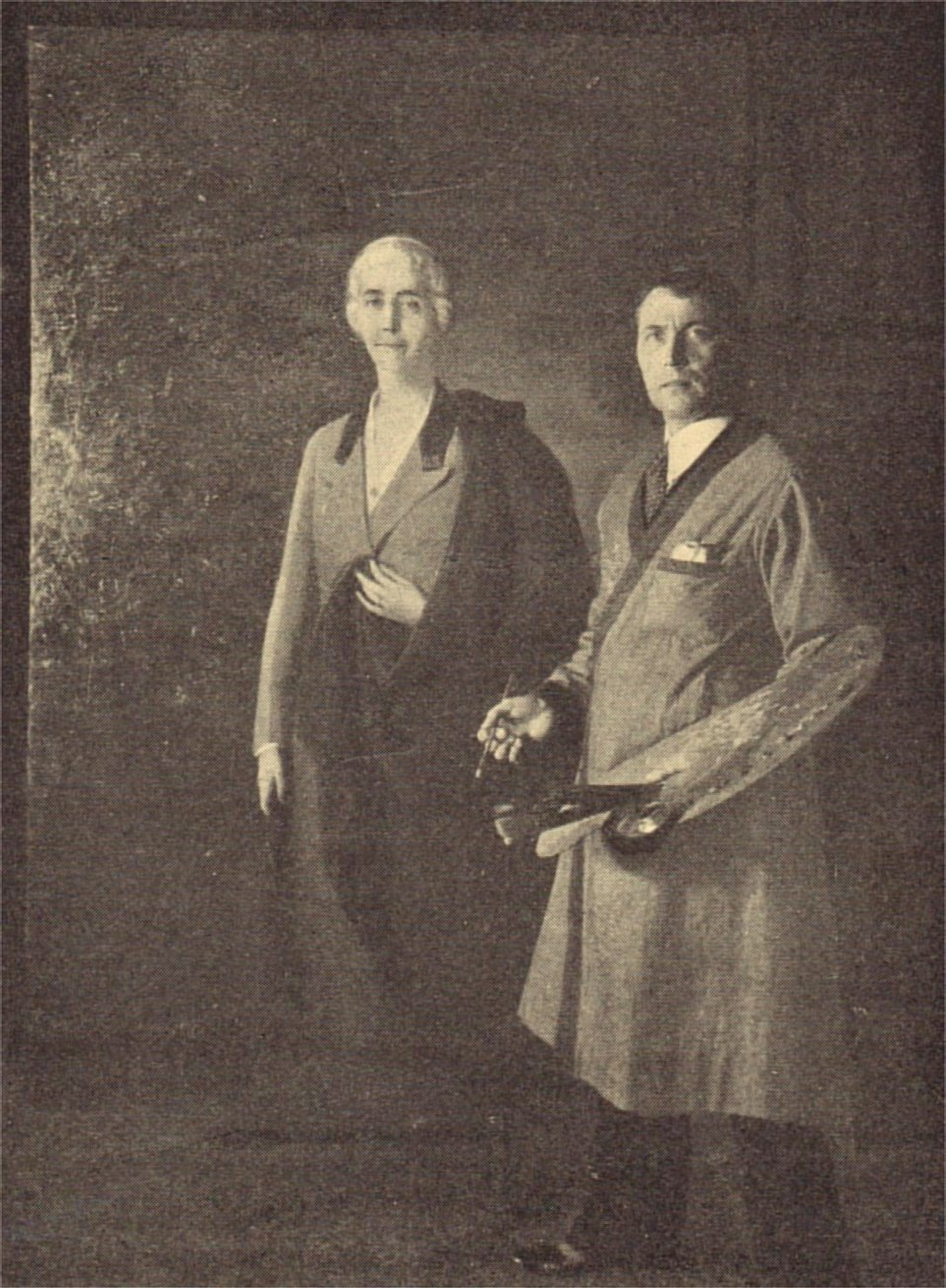
- Gleb Ilyin with his portrait of Mrs. Hoover; Mayflower Hotel, 1930.
- Born: Russian: Глеб Александрович Ильин; June 1, 1889; Kazan, Russian Empire
- Died: October 14, 1968 (aged 79); Sebastopol, California
- Education: Imperial Academy of Arts
- Known for: painting
- Spouse: Natalia Aleksandrovna Melnikov

Gleb Aleksander Ilyin (Russian: Глеб Алекса́ндрович Ильи́н ; 1889–1968) was a Russian-American painter known for his portraiture and landscape paintings.

== Early life ==
Ilyin was born on June 1, 1889, into an aristocratic family in Kazan, Russian Empire. His father was a judge, while his mother Eudoxie Kriganovsky, took care of the household. Gleb was encouraged in his art studies at an early age. He graduated in 1911 with highest honors from the Kazan Art School after four years of training under Nicolai Fechin (Russian: Николай Иванович Фешин; 1881–1955).

== Russia ==
He completed his formal art studies at the Imperial Academy of Arts in St. Petersburg (1911–1917) under Ilya Yefimovich Repin (Russian: Илья́ Ефи́мович Ре́пин, 1844–1930) and Konstantin Yegorovich Makovsky (Russian: Константин Егорович Маковский, 1839–1915).

Known outside of the academy for the quality of his work, Ilyin received invitations to do portraits of the imperial family (portrait of Grand Duke Constantine Constantinovich) and Saint Petersburg’s high society (portrait of Feodor Chaliapin). His work displayed at the Fall Exhibit of the Imperial Academy of Art in 1916 won a major prize. Gleb left Saint Petersburg in 1917 after the outbreak of the October Revolution and moved to Kazan for a short period until the Red Army captured the city. He escaped over the Ural Mountains to Omsk, along with other family members. On their way East, Ilyin met Natalie Melnikoff. After a short courtship they married in Chita, a city north of Mongolia.

The artist supported himself by painting portraits of Japanese officers stationed in Chita. After receiving letters of introduction and recommendations to prominent figures in Tokyo, Ilyin joined other White Russian refugees on their way to Japan in 1918.

== Japan ==
In Tokyo, the artist received commissions for portraits of government officials and members of the imperial court. After a series of successful and profitable exhibits, Ilyin moved to San Francisco with other family members in 1923.

== United States ==
His first exhibit in 1924 gained him a reputation as one of the most popular portrait painters in California. His aristocratic background opened doors to American high society and the homes of wealthy families. The artist commanded the highest prices for his work, frequently asking twice the average annual salary in California in the 1920s, for his commissioned pieces.

In 1928, The San Francisco Chronicle called him one of the city’s most skilled painters. In January 1930, the artist was invited to The White House to paint the portrait of Lou Henry Hoover, the wife of the U.S. president, her first portrait as the First Lady.

The Berkeley Gazette of November 16, 1933, in its assessment of Gleb Ilyin' s exhibit held at the Mills College Art Gallery wrote: "Ilyin's fusion of the academic and the modern in his work is indicated by his emphasis on the beauty of line, and his feeling for form, as well as by his use of color. While some of his portraits are in the modern style, others resemble the old masters. He is said to have been unusually successful in catching the spirit and manner of such great classic painters as Lawrence, Van Dyck, and Velasquez”.

In 1936, a Los Angeles Times journalist reviewing Ilyin's exhibit at the Stendhal Gallery described a most unusual incident when Ilyin walked into the Gallery and saw there his first art teacher from Kazan, Nicolai Fechin who had moved to Hollywood as one of the best established artists in the Western United States.

== Later life ==
Gleb Ilyin shared his studio with his older brother Peter Ilyin at 2977 Clay Street in San Francisco’s Pacific Heights district. Both frequently displayed their works in the same galleries and museums. In the mid-1940s, he was briefly a resident of Colorado. The artist spent his later years in Northern California on the Russian River where he died in Sebastopol on October 14, 1968.

== Artistic associations ==
San Francisco Bohemian Club, Carmel Art Association, Beaux Art Club of San Francisco, Russian Club of San Francisco (President).

== Major exhibits ==
Imperial Academy of Art, St. Petersburg (1916–1917), Imperial Art Exhibition (Tokyo), 1921–1922; City of Paris -San Francisco, 1924; San Francisco Art Association, 1924–1968; Bohemian Club, 1927–1968; California State Fairs, 1927–1956; De Young Museum; Oakland Art Gallery; Crocker Museum; Society of Western Artists, California Palace of the Legion of Honor, Santa Barbara Museum of Art.

== Works of art on permanent display ==
- The White House
- Denver Art Museum
- Oakland Museum of California
- San Francisco War Memorial
