= Vasily Boldyrev =

Russian army commander (1875–1933)

Vasily Georgievich Boldyrev
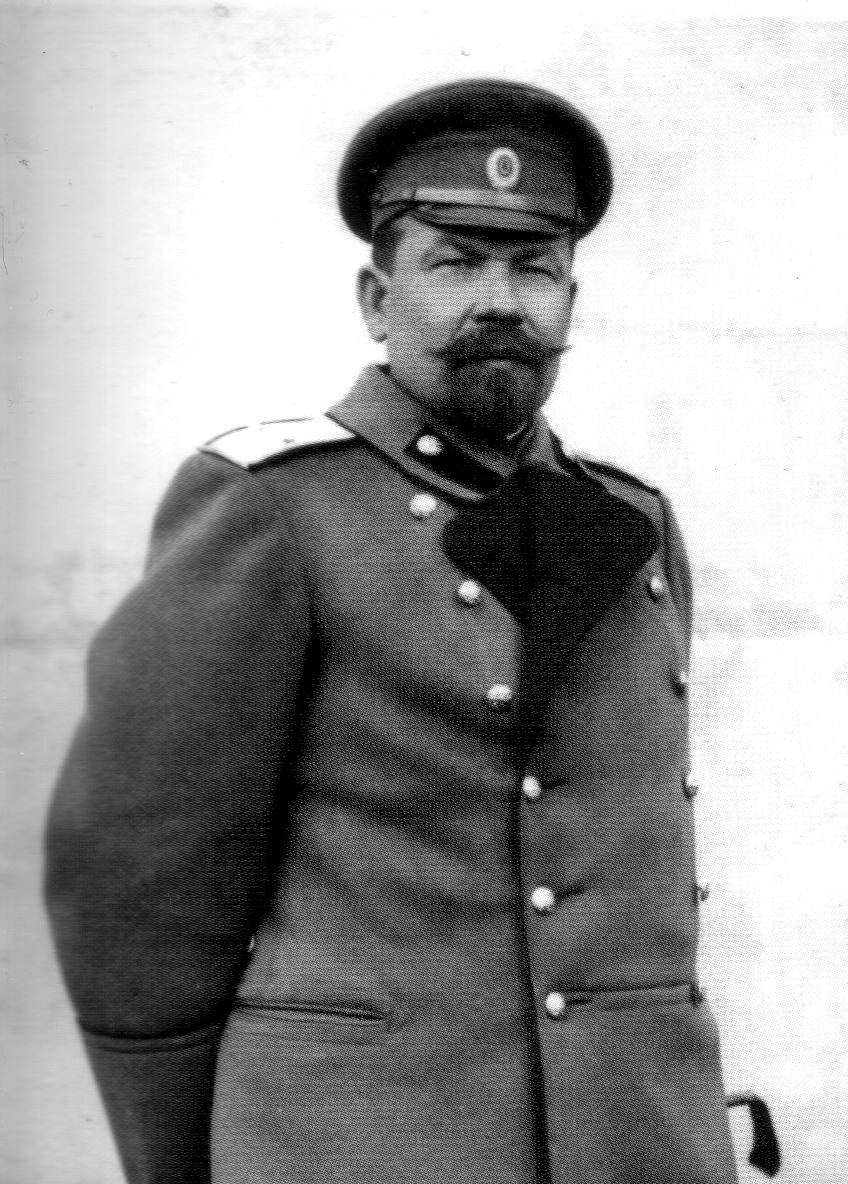
- Boldyrev, c. 1917–22
- Born: 17 April [O.S. 5 April] 1875; Syzran, Russian Empire
- Died: 20 August 1933 (aged 58); Novosibirsk, RSFSR, USSR
- Cause of death: Execution by shooting
- Military career
- Allegiance: Russian Empire
- Branch: (Russian Empire) Imperial Russian Army
- Lieutenant general
- Commands: 5th Army
- Conflicts: Russo-Japanese War; World War I Russian Civil War

Vasily Georgievich Boldyrev (Russian: Василий Георгиевич Болдырев; 17 April [O.S. 5 April] 1875 – 20 August 1933) was an Imperial Russian Army commander.

He was born in Samara Governorate and fought in the war against the Empire of Japan. He participated in World War I. After the February Revolution, on 19 April 1917 he was appointed commander of the 43rd Army Corps. A Lieutenant general since 29 April 1917, he replaced General Danilov on 9 September 1917 as commander of the 5th Army.

At the beginning of August 1918 Boldyrev arrived in Samara, and was elected as one of the 5 members of the Provisional All-Russian Government. After the arrival of Admiral Kolchak, he gave up his post and went to Japan on 28 November. He returned to Vladivostok in the beginning of 1920, and became Commander of the land and naval forces of the Far East (08.04 – 12.12.1920). In this capacity, he signed the Russian-Japanese agreement for a "neutral zone".

He stayed in Vladivostok and after the capture of the city by the Red Army on 5 November 1922 he was arrested. In prison, he declared his willingness to serve the Soviet government. In the summer of 1923 he was released. Afterward, he became a teacher and a research assistant at the West-Siberian Institute of Industrial Economic Research.

On December 29, 1932 (according to other data in August 1933), he was arrested on suspicion of having contacts with Japanese intelligence, or according to other data, of organizing a counterrevolutionary plot. He was shot on 20 August 1933.

== Awards ==
- Order of Saint Vladimir, 4th class, 1906
- Order of Saint Anna, 3rd class
- Order of Saint Stanislaus (House of Romanov), 2nd class, 1907
- Order of Saint Anna, 2nd class, 1908
- Order of Saint George, 4th degree (May 29, 1915)

Preceded by Yuri Danilov	Commander of the 5th Army; September 9 – November 13, 1917	Succeeded by Panteleimon Sukhanov
