= Leonid Ustrugov =

Russian railway engineer

- Леонид Устругов
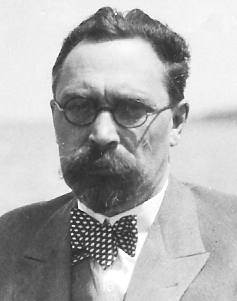

1st Minister of Transport of the Russian Government
- In office November 18, 1918 – November 13, 1919
- Prime Minister: Alexander Kolchak
- Preceded by: Office established
- Succeeded by: Alexey Larionov

Personal details
- Born: November 23, 1877 Moscow, Russian Empire
- Died: February 15, 1938 (aged 60) Kommunarka shooting ground, Moscow Oblast, Soviet Union
- Resting place: Kommunarka shooting ground
- Education: Institute of Railway Engineers
- Awards: Order of Saint Anna

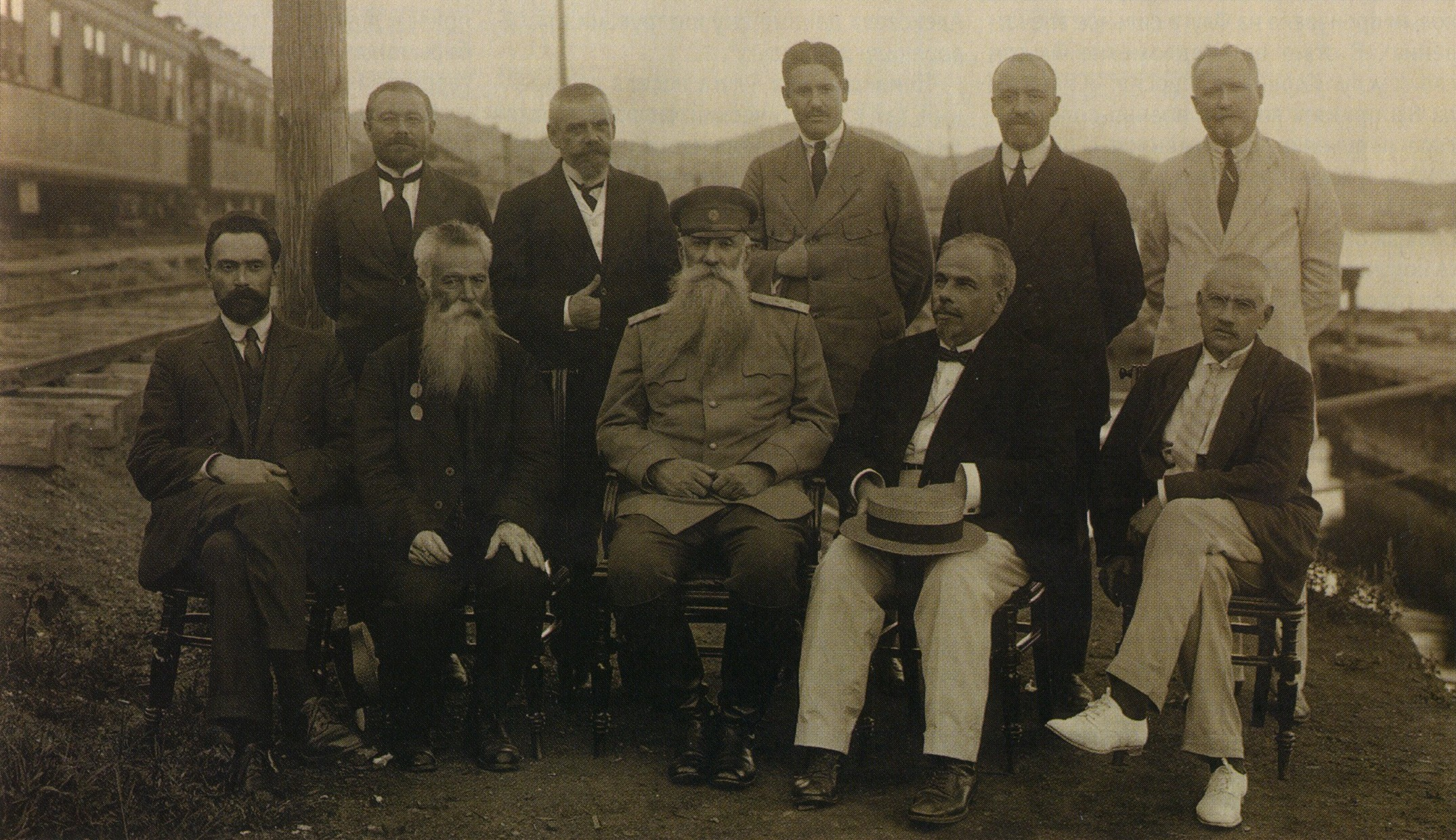
Government (business office) of General Dmitry Horvat. Vladivostok, 1918. Sitting: Leonid Ustrugov, Mikhail Kursky, Dmitry Horvat, Stepan Vostrotin, Vasily Flug. Standing: Sergey Taskin, Vasily Alferev, Alexander Okorokov, Vladimir Glukharyov, Professor Jacob Brandt

Leonid Aleksandrovich Ustrugov (Russian: Леонид Александрович Устругов; November 23, 1877 – February 15, 1938) was a Russian railway engineer who served as the Minister of Railways in the White government of Admiral Alexander Kolchak during the Russian Civil War from 1918 to 1920. He later became a victim of Stalin's Great Purge.

== Family ==
The identity of Ustrugov's parents is unknown. In 1891, he was given the surname of the daughter of a major, Vera Gavrilovna Ustrugova, who adopted him. His first marriage was to Yelizaveta Stepanovna (maiden surname unknown), with whom he had three daughters: Vera, Tatyana, and Elena. His second marriage was to Maria Ivanovna Chronovskaya, who bore him a daughter who died in infancy two sons, Leonid and Nikolai. Nikolai died in the first winter of the siege of Leningrad.

== Education ==
Ustrugov graduated from the Komissarovsky Technical School (1897) and the Saint Petersburg Institute of Railway Engineers (1902) with the title of engineer of communications (railways) and the rank of collegiate secretary.

== Railway Engineer ==
Ustrugov had an extensive career in railway engineering. In 1902–1906, he worked as the manufacturer of the construction of the Moscow Ring Railway. On April 1, 1906, he was made Assistant Chief of the section of the Moscow–Kiev–Voronezh Railway. On June 23, 1906, he became controller of passenger trains at the Moscow–Passenger station. From September 16, 1906, he served as a reserve agent for the Moscow–Passenger station. From February 1, 1907, he was Assistant Head of the Northern Railway's technical movement. From January 1, 1909 – Auditor, from July 15, 1909, he was Senior Auditor of the Northern Railway Traffic Services. On January 8, 1911, he became Assistant Chief of the Service of the Samara–Zlatoust Railway. On April 15, 1913, he was appointed Head of the Omsk Railway Traffic Service, Deputy Head of the Omsk Railway. For impeccable mobilization work in 1914, he was awarded the Order of Saint Anna, 3rd class. On May 1, 1916, he was made Head of the Omsk Railway, and on November 1, 1916, he was made Assistant Head of the Railway Department of the Ministry of Railways of Russia. From February to October 1917, he served as Deputy Minister of Railways under the Provisional Government.

== Activities during the Civil War ==
Ustrugov was active in the White movement during the Russian Civil War. On the night of January 25–26, 1918, at a secret meeting of the Siberian Regional Duma, he was elected in absentia and without his consent to be the Minister of Railways in the center-left anti-Bolshevik government of Peter Derber. In April 1918, at a meeting of shareholders of the Chinese Eastern Railway (CER), he was elected a member of the provisional board of the CER, was a member of the so-called "Business Cabinet" headed by General Dmitry Horvat as Minister of Communications (Railways).

On November 4, 1918, Ustrugov was appointed Minister of Railways of the Provisional All-Russian Government, from November 18, 1918 – Russian Government, acting under the Supreme Ruler Alexander Kolchak. On November 19, 1918, he was also appointed Deputy Chairman of the Council of Ministers. He was considered one of the most competent members of the government of Alexander Kolchak, but had little interest in political issues. In March 1919, in Vladivostok, he signed an agreement on the management of the Trans-Siberian Railway with allies from the International Committee, which was supposed to improve throughput, and increase and streamline the freight traffic of this railway. However, according to historians, a dual power arose between Ustrugov and the American engineer Stevens, which had a negative effect on the work of the railway.

In the autumn of 1919, Ustrugov acted as head of military communications (railways) of the rear as an assistant chief of staff of the Supreme Commander-in-Chief (the ministry was headed by Deputy Minister of Railways Minister Alexei Larionov).

== Emigration, return, death ==
In 1920, Ustrugov emigrated to China. He and his family lived in Harbin, in 1924–1935, he was the second rector of the Harbin Polytechnic Institute, where Russian emigrants received an engineering education. Today, it is the Harbin Institute of Technology.

In 1935, at the invitation of the government, Ustrugov and his family returned to the Soviet Union together with the employees of the CER, who were also Soviet citizens. For some time he worked in his specialty in the People's Commissariat of Communications (Railways) in Moscow.

On October 7, 1937, Ustrugov was arrested. On February 15, 1938, he was sentenced by the Military Collegium of the Supreme Court of the USSR to be shot on charges of espionage and participation in a counter-revolutionary organization. On the same day, he was shot and buried at the Kommunarka shooting ground located southwest of Moscow. He was posthumously rehabilitated in May 1989 by the Plenum of the Supreme Court of the USSR. He was survived by his second wife and youngest son.

== Sources ==
- Nikolai Dmitriev. Ministers-railwaymen // White army. White matter. Historical popular science almanac. Number 10. Ekaterinburg, 2002.
