= Ivan Mikhailov (politician) =

Russian economist and politician (1891-1946)

- Иван Михайлов
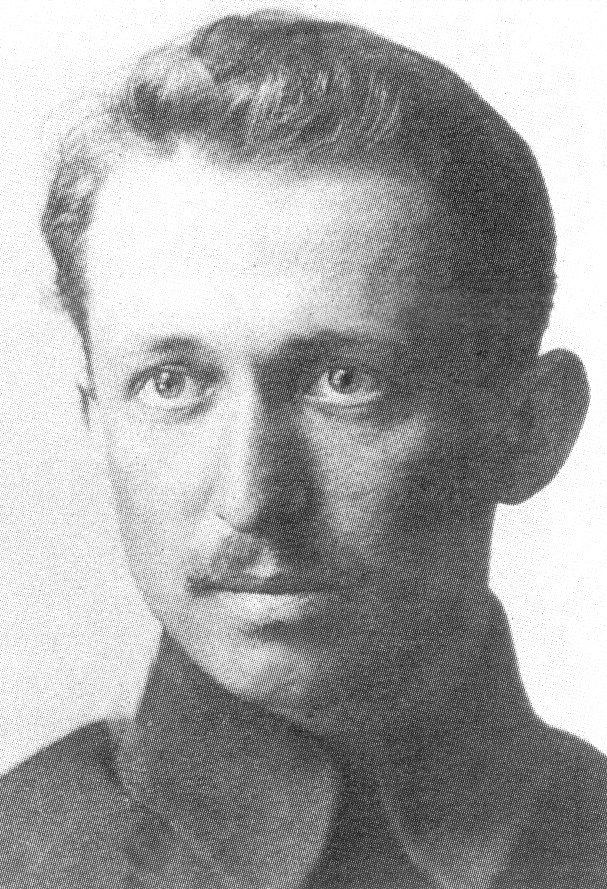

Minister of Finance of the Provisional All-Russian Government
- In office January 1918 – 16 August 1919
- Leader: Alexander Kolchak
- Preceded by: Position established (Mikhail Bernatskiy as Finance Minister of the Russian Republic)
- Succeeded by: Lev Goyer

Personal details
- Born: 29 November 1891 Ust-Kara, Russian Empire
- Died: 30 August 1946 (aged 54) Moscow, Russian SFSR, Soviet Union
- Party: Socialist-Revolutionary Party (until 1918)

Ivan Adrianovich Mikhailov (Russian: Ива́н Адриа́нович Миха́йлов; 29 November 1891 – 30 August 1946) was a Russian politician, economist, and White émigré who served in the Provisional All-Russian Government of Alexander Kolchak as Minister of Finance from January 1918 to 16 August 1919, during the Russian Civil War. Following the defeat of the Whites and the establishment of the Soviet Union, Mikhailov fled to Harbin and worked with the Japanese forces in Manchukuo, serving on the board of the Chinese Eastern Railway. Following the Soviet invasion of Manchuria, Mikhailov was captured by SMERSH and executed in 1946. Mikhailov was also known as the "Grey Cardinal" of the White movement, due to his influence on Kolchak, or as the "Siberian Machiavelli", due to his frequent participation in plots and conspiracies.

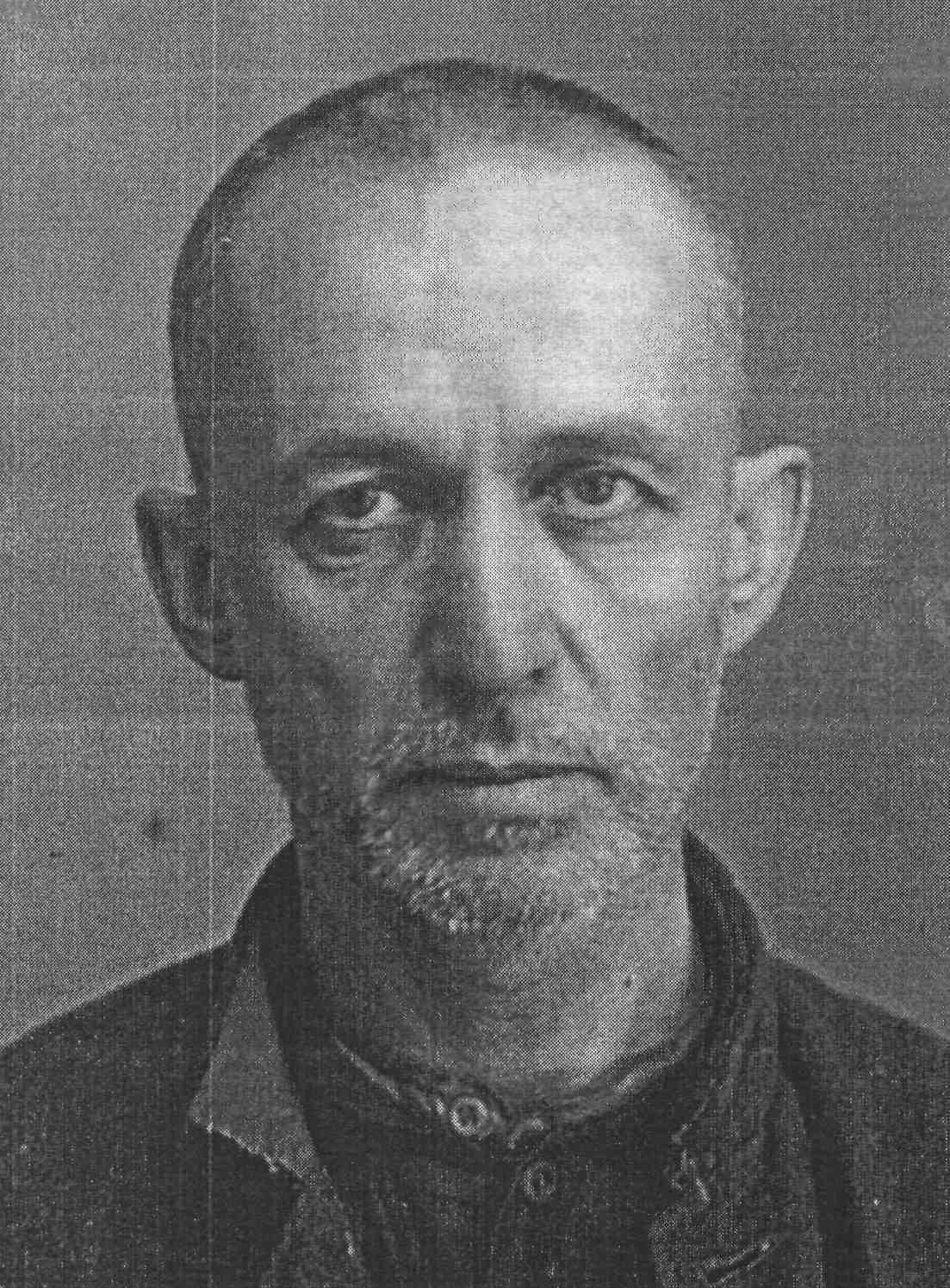
Mikhailov's MGB mugshot, 1945
