= Viktor Pepelyayev =

Russian politician (1885–1920)

- Виктор Пепеляев
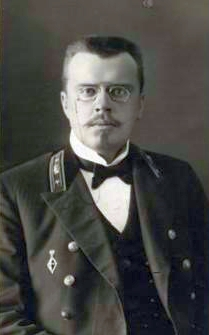

2nd Chairman of the Council of Ministers of the Russian State
- In office November 22, 1919 – January 4, 1920
- Preceded by: Pyotr Vologodsky
- Succeeded by: Office abolished

Personal details
- Born: 8 January 1885 Narym, Tomsk Governorate, Russian Empire
- Died: 7 February 1920 (aged 35) Ushankovka River, Irkutsk, Russian State
- Cause of death: Execution
- Party: Constitutional Democratic Party

Viktor Nikolayevich Pepelyayev (Russian: Ви́ктор Никола́евич Пепеля́ев; 8 January 1885 – 7 February 1920) was a Russian politician, a supporter of Admiral Alexander Kolchak, a key perpetrator of the White Terror, and the Chairman of the Council of Ministers of the State of Russia.

== Biography ==
Pepelyaev was born on January 8, 1885, in Narym, Tomsk Governorate, in the family of Nikolai Pepelyaev, a general of the tsarist army. Viktor graduated from Tomsk men's gymnasium. He entered the law faculty of Tomsk University, which he graduated in 1909. In 1909 he taught history at Biysk Gymnasium.

In 1912 he was elected as an elector, and on October 20, 1912, at the provincial election meeting of the Tomsk province as a deputy of the State Duma from the cadet party. On January 15, 1914, at the First Teacher's Congress in St. Petersburg, he proposed to provide Siberian natives (Yakuts, etc.) with free primary education. By this he set Russian nationalists against himself.

During World War I, Pepelyaev, along with another Siberian deputy, S. A. Taskin, worked at the front at the head of the 3rd Siberian sanitary detachment.

=== February Revolution ===
During the February Revolution, on February 28, he was appointed commissar to the Petrograd city government. On March 2, the Provisional Government issued order No. 169 “with instructions to State Duma member V. N. Pepelyaev to be the port commander of Kronstadt and the commissar of the Provisional Government." During Lavr Kornilov's uprising, Viktor took his side and volunteered for the 8th Siberian Mortar Division.

=== Russian Civil War ===
From the October Revolution to the spring of 1918, he remained in Petrograd and took part in the underground struggle against the Bolsheviks during the Russian Civil War. In the spring of 1918, he became a member of the Moscow department of the National Center organization. On instructions from the "National Center" and the Central Committee of the Cadet Party, Pepelyaev went to Siberia in August 1918.

On November 9, 1918, he was elected in Omsk the chairman of the Eastern Department of the Cadet Central Committee. On November 15, 1918, at a Cadet Party conference, he called for the establishment of a military dictatorship. He was one of the participants in the events in Omsk on November 18, 1918, which brought Admiral Alexander Kolchak to power. He became director of the police department of the Kolchak government and was one of the key executors of the White Terror. In December 1918, he left the Cadet Party. In May 1919 he was appointed Minister of Foreign Affairs.

On November 22, 1919, Pepelyayev was appointed Chairman of the Council of Ministers. He was the only politician loyal to the admiral and, together with the Supreme Ruler, was transferred by the Czechoslovak command to the Irkutsk Political Center. He, Kolchak, and other members of Kolchak's government were imprisoned in Irkutsk.

On February 7, 1920, at 5 a.m., by decree No. 27 of the Irkutsk Military Revolutionary Committee in response to direct orders from Vladimir Lenin, Pepelyaev was executed along with Kolchak at the mouth of the Ushankovka River which flows into the Angara in Irkutsk.

== See also ==
- Russian Civil War
- White Terror (Russia)
