= Provisional All-Russian Government =

1918 short-lived anti-communist regime

Provisional All-Russian Government (Note: Provisional All-Russian Government: Russian: Вре́менное Всеросси́йское прави́тельство, romanized: Vrémennoye Vserossíyskoye pravítel'stvo; Directory: Russian: Директо́рия, romanized: Direktóriya; Ufa Directory: Russian: Уфи́мская Директо́рия, romanized: Ufímskaya Direktóriya; Omsk Directory: Russian: О́мская Директо́рия, romanized: Ómskaya Direktóriya)
- Flag of Russia

Department overview
- Formed: September 23, 1918
- Preceding Department: Russian Provisional Government
- Dissolved: November 18, 1918
- Superseding Department: Russian State Government
- Jurisdiction: Russian State
- Headquarters: Ufa (to October 9, 1918) Omsk
- Ministers responsible: Pyotr Vologodsky, prime minister; Vladimir Vinogradov, deputy prime minister

The Provisional All-Russian Government, informally known as the Directory, the Ufa Directory, or the Omsk Directory, was a short-lived government of the Russian State during the Russian Civil War, formed on 23 September 1918 at the State Conference in Ufa as a result of a forced and extremely unstable compromise of various anti-Communist forces in eastern Russia. It was dissolved two months later after the coup, which had brought Admiral Alexander Kolchak to power in Communist-free areas of eastern Russia. It was meant to be a continuation of the original Russian Provisional Government that was overthrown during the October Revolution in 1917.

The Government was formed from the Committee of Members of the Constituent Assembly, mainly Socialist Revolutionaries and Kadets based in Samara, and from the Provisional Siberian Government of regional politicians and rightist officers and based in Omsk. The two regimes had previously failed to work effectively together, with rivalry leading to a customs war and to numerous border disputes. In November 1918 a military coup by right-wing Kadets, officers, and Cossacks, with some support from the Allies, overthrew the Provisional All-Russian Government and appointed Admiral Kolchak as the Supreme Leader of Russia. Kolchak, who had been the Minister of War in the government for two weeks, was supported by the coup faction to create a new government that would have no SR influence.

Despite its problems, the Provisional All-Russian Government was recognized by all White Russian factions east of the Urals and also established a unified foreign policy. It had the support of Russia's former diplomatic missions abroad. But the government's Directory did not have a large administrative state, and continued to rely on the institutions of the former Provisional Siberian Government in Omsk, which was also where the Allied powers set up their diplomatic and military offices.

== Formation ==
A State Conference took place at Ufa between 8 and 23 September 1918, which resulted in the establishment of this alternative to the Russian Republic and then when that was overthrown by the Bolshevik government. It encompassed 170 delegates, including some from other regions.

According to William Henry Chamberlin, "Partly under pressure from the Czechs, who were becoming impatient at the inability of the anti-Bolshevik Russians, whom they had been aiding, to help themselves, a state conference, attended by representatives of the Omsk and Samara Governments and other numerous political organizations and regional authorities, opened in Ufa on September 8 for the purpose of working out some scheme of political and military unity. The radicals at Ufa wished to make the new government, which was to be created, responsible before the original Constituent Assembly; the conservatives wanted to make it as authoritarian and as free from external control as possible..." A compromise resulted with the formation of a five man Directory, but the Constituent Assembly would resume activity if 250 member gathered by 1 January 1919, or 170 by 1 February.

The five person Directory had their deputies, personal backup members of the Directory, some of whom were located at a considerable distance from Ufa.

Elected members	Nikolai Avksentiev	Nikolai Astrov (in the South)	Vasily Boldyrev	Pyotr Vologodsky (in the Far East)	Nikolai Tchaikovsky (in Arkhangelsk)
Elected deputies	Andrei Argunov	Vladimir Vinogradov	Mikhail Alekseyev (in the South)	Vasily Sapozhnikov	Vladimir Zenzinov
Real composition	Nikolai Avksentiev	Vladimir Vinogradov	Vasily Boldyrev	Pyotr Vologodsky	Vladimir Zenzinov

The Council of Ministers carried out the day-to-day administration of the government. A majority of the Council of Ministers (10 out of 14) had served formerly as members of the Provisional Siberian Government.

== Views ==
The Act on the Formation of the All-Russian Supreme Power established that the PA-RG “is the only bearer of supreme power throughout the entire Russia until the convocation of the Constituent Assembly”. The Act provided "the transfer of all the functions temporarily assigned by the regional governments" to the PA-RG. Thus, the sovereignty of regional formations was canceled and replaced by "broad autonomy of regions", which limits completely depended on the "wisdom of the Provisional All-Russian Government".

The foundations of the national state structure of Russia should have proceeded from federal principles: “the organization of liberated Russia on the basis of recognizing of broad autonomy for its individual areas, due to geographic, economic and ethnic characteristics; assuming the final establishment of the federal government by the sovereign Constituent Assembly ..., recognition of right for cultural and national self-determination for the minorities that do not occupy a separate territory".

The following were named as urgent tasks to restore the state unity and independence of Russia:

1. Struggle for the liberation of Russia from the Soviet government;
2. Reunification of the torn away, fallen away and scattered regions of Russia;
3. Non-recognition of the Brest and all other treaties, concluded both on behalf of Russia and its individual parts after the February Revolution, by any government, except for the Russian Provisional Government; restoration of the actual force of contractual relations with the Entente powers;
4. Continuation of the war against the German coalition.

== Activity ==
Council of Ministers
- Cabinet of Russia

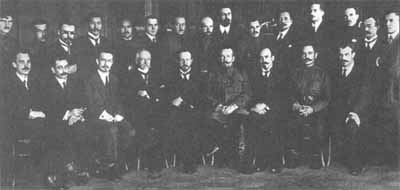
- Members of the Directory and the Council
- Date formed: 4 November 1918
- Date dissolved: 18 November 1918

People and organisations
- Chairman: Pyotr Vologodsky
- Deputy Chairman: Vladimir Vinogradov
- No. of ministers: 14
- Member party: Socialist Revolutionary, Constitutional Democratic

History
- Predecessor: Komuch and Siberian government
- Successor: Council of Ministers of the Russian State

On October 9, the Directory left Ufa and moved to Omsk due to the threat of the capture of Ufa by the advancing Soviet troops. On October 13, the former commander of the Black Sea Fleet Vice Admiral Alexander Kolchak arrived in Omsk, who later became a member of the Council of Ministers of the PA-RG. On November 4, the Government appealed to the regions with a demand to immediately dissolve "all Regional Governments and Representative Institutions without exception" and transfer all powers to the All-Russian Government (Council of Ministers). Such a centralization of state was justified by the need to "recreate the homeland's combat power, which is so necessary in the time of the struggle for the revival of Great and United Russia", and "to create the necessary conditions to supply the army and organize the rear". On the same day, on the basis of the Provisional Siberian Government, the executive body of the Directory was formed — the All-Russian Council of Ministers, headed by Pyotr Vologodsky. Now it was possible to achieve the abolition of all regional, national and Cossack governments in the East of Russia and thereby formally consolidate the forces of anti-Bolshevik resistance.

=== Council of Ministers of the Provisional All-Russian Government ===
The "All-Russian" Council of Ministers, formed on 4 November 1918, included:

1. Pyotr Vologodsky as Prime minister
2. Vladimir Vinogradov as Deputy Prime minister
3. Alexander Kolchak as minister of war and navy
4. Yuri Klyuchnikov as minister of foreign affairs
5. Alexander Gattenberger as minister of the interior
6. Ivan Serebrennikov as minister of supplies
7. Ivan Mikhailov as minister of finance
8. Nikolay Zefirov as minister of food
9. Sergei Starynkevich as minister of justice
10. Leonid Ustrugov as minister of railways
11. Vasily Sapozhnikov as minister of education
12. Leonid Shumilovsky as minister of labor
13. Nikolay Petrov as minister of agriculture
14. Nikolay Shchukin as acting minister of trade and industry
15. Grigory Krasnov as state controller
16. Georgy Telberg as chief of staff

== Kolchak coup d'etat ==
The Directory coup occurred on the night of 17 November 1918, when Krasilnikov's detachment burst onto a meeting of Avksentiev, Zenzinov, Rakov, Gendelman, three delegates from the Archangel Government, and Assistant Minister of the Interior Rogovsky. All of them were members of the Socialist-Revolutionary Party. Krasilnikov arrested Avksentiev and Zenzinov. On 18 November, Premier Vologodosky called a meeting of the Cabinet, and soon there was general agreement the only solution to the political crisis was a personal dictatorship. Kolchak assumed the title of Supreme Ruler, "Commander-in-chief of all the land and naval forces of Russia." Avksentiev, Zenzinov, and Argunov were deported to Paris. Boldyrev also left the country.

The Council of Ministers came to the conclusion about the need for "the complete concentration of military and civil power in the hands of one person with an authoritative name in the military and public circles." It was decided in principle “to transfer temporarily the exercise of supreme power to one person, based on the assistance of the Council of Ministers, assigning to such a person the name of the Supreme Ruler", after which "the Regulations on the temporary structure of state power in Russia" (the so-called Constitution of November 18) was developed and adopted, which established the procedure for the relationship of the Council of Ministers and the Supreme Ruler.

The next morning, The Council of Ministers met after the arrest of the Social Revolutionaries, the ministers decided on the need to assume full supreme power and then transfer it to an elected person who would lead on the principles of unity of command. The election was held on a secret ballot using closed notes and Admiral Alexander Kolchak was chosen.

Kolchak issued the following appeal to the population:

"The Provisional All-Russian Government has fallen. The Council of Ministers, having all the power in its hands, has invested me, Admiral Alexander Kolchak, with this power. I have accepted this responsibility in the exceptionally difficult circumstances of civil war and complete disorganisation of the country, and I now make it known that I shall follow neither the reactionary path nor the deadly path of party strife. My chief aims are the organisation of a fighting force, the overthrow of Bolshevism, and the establishment of law and order, so that the Russian people may be able to choose a form of government in accordance with its desire and to realise the high ideas of liberty and freedom. I call upon you, citizens, to unite and to sacrifice your all, if necessary, in the struggle with Bolshevism."

Included among Kolchak's ministers was former prominent Tsarist minister Sergey Sazonov, who would represent the government at the Paris Peace Conference.

A new Russian government was formed, in which nearly all of the member of the Directory's Council of Ministers retained their offices. It operated until January 4, 1920.

== Sources ==
- Shmelev, Anatol (2021). In the Wake of Empire: Anti-Bolshevik Russia in International Affairs, 1917–1920. Hoover Institution. ISBN 978-0-8179-2426-3.
- Mawdsley, Evan (1997). Edward Action, Vladimir Cherniaev, William G. Rosenberg (ed.). Critical Companion to the Russian Revolution, 1914–1921. Indiana University Press. ISBN 978-0-340-76365-0.
- Evan Mawdsley, The Russian Civil War (2008). Edinburgh, Birlinn, pp. 143–8.
