= Pyotr Vologodsky =

Russian statesman and lawyer (1863–1925)

- Пётр Вологодский
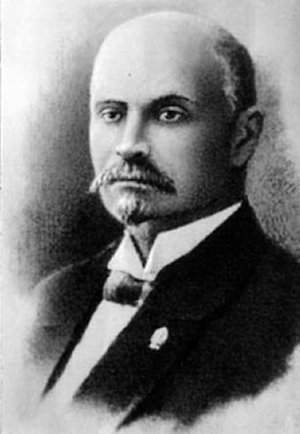

1st Chairman of the Council of Ministers of the Russian state
- In office November 18, 1918 – November 22, 1919
- Preceded by: Office established
- Succeeded by: Viktor Pepelyayev

Chairman of the Provisional Government of the Siberian Republic
- In office June 30, 1918 – 3 November 1918
- Preceded by: Pyotr Derber
- Succeeded by: Office abolished

Personal details
- Born: January 18, 1863
- Died: November 19, 1925 (aged 62) Harbin, China
- Party: Socialist Revolutionary Party

Pyotr Vasilievich Vologodsky (January 18, 1863 – November 19, 1925, Russian: Пётр Васи́льевич Волого́дский) was a Russian statesman, public figure, and mason. He was the first chairman of the Council of Ministers of the Russian state and the second and last chairman of the Provisional Siberian government.

== Biography ==
Born into the family of a priest, Vologodsky graduated in 1884 from Tomsk Men's Gymnasium, and later entered the law faculty of St. Petersburg University. He was expelled for "disreputable behaviour" in 1887 and sent to Tomsk. In 1892, he externally passed the exams for a course in the law faculty of Kharkiv University.

From 1887 onwards, he served in the judicial institutions of Tomsk, Barnaul, Verny, and Semipalatinsk. With the introduction of judicial charters in Siberia in 1897, he became a sworn attorney. In 1905, he acted as a lawyer during the political process of the demonstrations in Tomsk and as the prosecutor in the case of the pogrom in Tomsk in 1905.

Pyotr Vologodsky took part in the creation of the Socialist Revolutionary Organization in Tomsk. He was a devoted activist throughout the regional movement. Further, he participated in the preparation of the draft of the "Basic Provisions of the Siberian Regional-Union" and in the work of his congress, the meetings of which were held at his house on August 28–29, 1905. From 1901 to 1917, he was a member of the Tomsk City Council.

He was elected as a deputy to the Second State Duma from the Tomsk province according to the list of progressives but did not participate in its work, because the emperor managed to dissolve the Duma before Vologodsky arrived in the capital. Also, he was a member of the newspaper "Siberian Bulletin". He was the editor of the "Siberian Life" newspaper.

In March 1917, Pyotr Vologodsky became one of three members of the provincial commissariat for the management of the Tomsk province, created after the removal from the office of Governor Vladimir Dubinsky. At the end of January 1918, at an illegal meeting of the Siberian Regional Duma, he was elected to the Provisional Government of Autonomous Siberia and was appointed Minister of Foreign Affairs.

On 30 June 1918, after the Revolt of the Czechoslovak Legion, Vologodsky headed the Provisional Siberian Government (Omsk). In September, he became part of the five-man Ufa Directory.

After the creation of the Russian State, on November 4, 1918, the executive body of the Directory, the All-Russian Council of Ministers, was formed. Vologodsky was appointed Chairman of the Council. He resigned on November 18, 1918, after Admiral Kolchak came to power, but at the insistence of the right-wing public, he took the post of chairman of the Council of Ministers. In December 1918, in connection with the departure of Klyuchnikov, he temporarily acted as Minister of Foreign Affairs. He resigned on November 22, 1919.

By a resolution of the Administrative Council of the Provisional Siberian Government of November 3, 1918, Vologodsky was awarded the title of Honorary Citizen of Siberia. In the winter of 1919–1920, he emigrated to China. There, he served in a business partnership. In 1920, he was a member of the Committee of Representatives of the Russian population of Tianjin. Five years later, Vologodsky died on November 19, 1925, in the city of Harbin.
