= Vladimir Zenzinov =

Russian revolutionary and author

- Влади́мир Зензи́нов
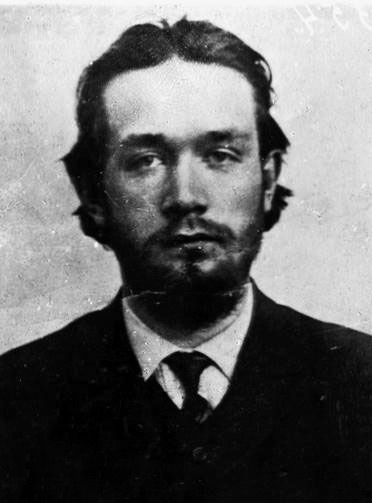
- Zenzinov as a young man

Member of the Russian Constituent Assembly
- In office 25 November 1917 – 20 January 1918 (Note: The Constituent Assembly was declared dissolved by the Bolshevik-Left SR Soviet government, rendering the end the term served.)
- Preceded by: Constituency established
- Succeeded by: Constituency abolished
- Constituency: Petrograd

Personal details
- Born: Vladimir Mikhailovich Zenzinov; November 29, 1880 Moscow, Russian Empire
- Died: October 20, 1953 (aged 72) New York City, New York, U.S.
- Resting place: Park West Memorial Chapel
- Party: Socialist Revolutionary Party
- Education: University of Heidelberg
- Occupation: Revolutionary, political activist, writer

Vladimir Mikhailovich Zenzinov (Russian: Влади́мир Миха́йлович Зензи́нов; historically, his surname was also transcribed as Sensinoff: 29 November 1880 — 20 October 1953) was a member of Russia's Socialist-Revolutionary Party, a participant of the First (1905), Second (February 1917), and Third (November 1917) Russian Revolutions, and an author of a number of books.

== Biography ==
Vladimir Zenzinov was born in Moscow in 1880, the son of a merchant. He studied at several universities in Germany and was known as one of the 'Heidelberg SRs'. His friendship with N.D. Avksentiev and A.R. Gots dates from that period. He joined the Socialist-Revolutionary Party (PSR) in 1901 and returned to Russia in 1904. Arrested at the beginning of the Revolution of 1905 and sentenced to five years banishment in Siberia, he escaped to Western Europe, then returned to St. Petersburg in 1906. He worked for the PSR in various capacities and was elected to its Central Committee. He was active in Moscow, St. Petersburg and Kyiv. In September 1906, he was arrested again and banished to Siberia. In 1907, he escaped, making his way to Western Europe via Japan, Shanghai, Hong Kong, Singapore, Colombo, and the Suez Canal. He soon returned illegally to Russia.

Arrested again in 1910, Zenzinov was banished to northern Yakutia to make escape impossible. There he devoted himself to ethnographic studies and wrote several pioneering anthropological works on the subject, e.g.: Starinnye liudi u kholodnogo okeana (Moscow, 1914) and Ocherki torgovli na severe Yakutskoi oblasti (Moscow, 1916). In his memoirs, he tells of some extremely isolated places he visited, such as the village of Russkoye Ustye in the Arctic. In 1915 Zenzinov returned to European Russia and lived in Moscow and St. Petersburg. He participated in the February Revolution of 1917, played various roles in the All-Russian Soviet of Workers', Soldiers' and Peasants' Deputies and supported the Provisional Government under A.F. Kerensky. With respect to World War I, which bitterly divided the PSR, Zenzinov adopted a 'Revolutionary Defencist' position: opposed to the war before the February Revolution, he supported the 'defence of the revolution' against Germany. Zenzinov tried to mediate between more radical 'Defencists' (like A.A. Argunov and the 'Internationalists' led by V.M. Chernov and M.A. Natanson.

Zenzinov opposed the October Revolution. He was elected as an SR deputy to the one-day Constituent Assembly, dispersed by the Bolsheviks in 1918. Thereafter Zenzinov joined the rump Constituent Assembly government in Samara in 1918. He was briefly one of the Directors of the Provisional All-Russian Government, together with N.D. Avksentiev and others. Arrested during a military coup by Admiral Kolchak in November 1918, Zenzinov was exiled to China. From there he made his way back to Western Europe. He lived in Berlin until Hitler came to power in 1933, then moved to Paris. During this time he published several more books and worked for a variety of émigré socialist journals, including Volya Rossiya, Golos Rossii, Dni, Novaya Rossiya and Sovremennye zapiski.

In 1939, Zenzinov went to Finland to witness the beginning of World War II and the Soviet attack on Finland, and to gather information on Russia. In 1940, Zenzinov emigrated to the United States, settling in New York and writing his memoirs.

== Works ==
- Starinnye liudi u kholodnogo okeana, (Moscow, 1914)
- Ocherki torgovli na severe Yakutskoi oblasti, (Moscow, 1916)
- The Road to Oblivion, (New York, 1931)
- Iz zhizni revoliutsionera, (Paris, 1919)
- Nena, (Berlin, 1925)
- Zheleznyi skrezhet. Iz amerikanskikh vpechatlenii, (Paris, 1926)
- Perezhitoe, (New York, 1953)
- Vstrecha s Rossiei, New York 1945

== Sources ==
- Vladimir Zenzinov Papers: Vladimir Zenzinov Biography
- Hildermeier, M., Die Sozialrevolutionäre Partei Russlands: Agrarsozialismus u. Modernisierung im Zarenreich (1900-1914). Cologne, 1978.
