= Supreme Ruler of Russia =

Leader of the anti-Bolshevik White Movement during the Russian Civil War

- Верховный правитель России
- Banner of the Supreme Ruler

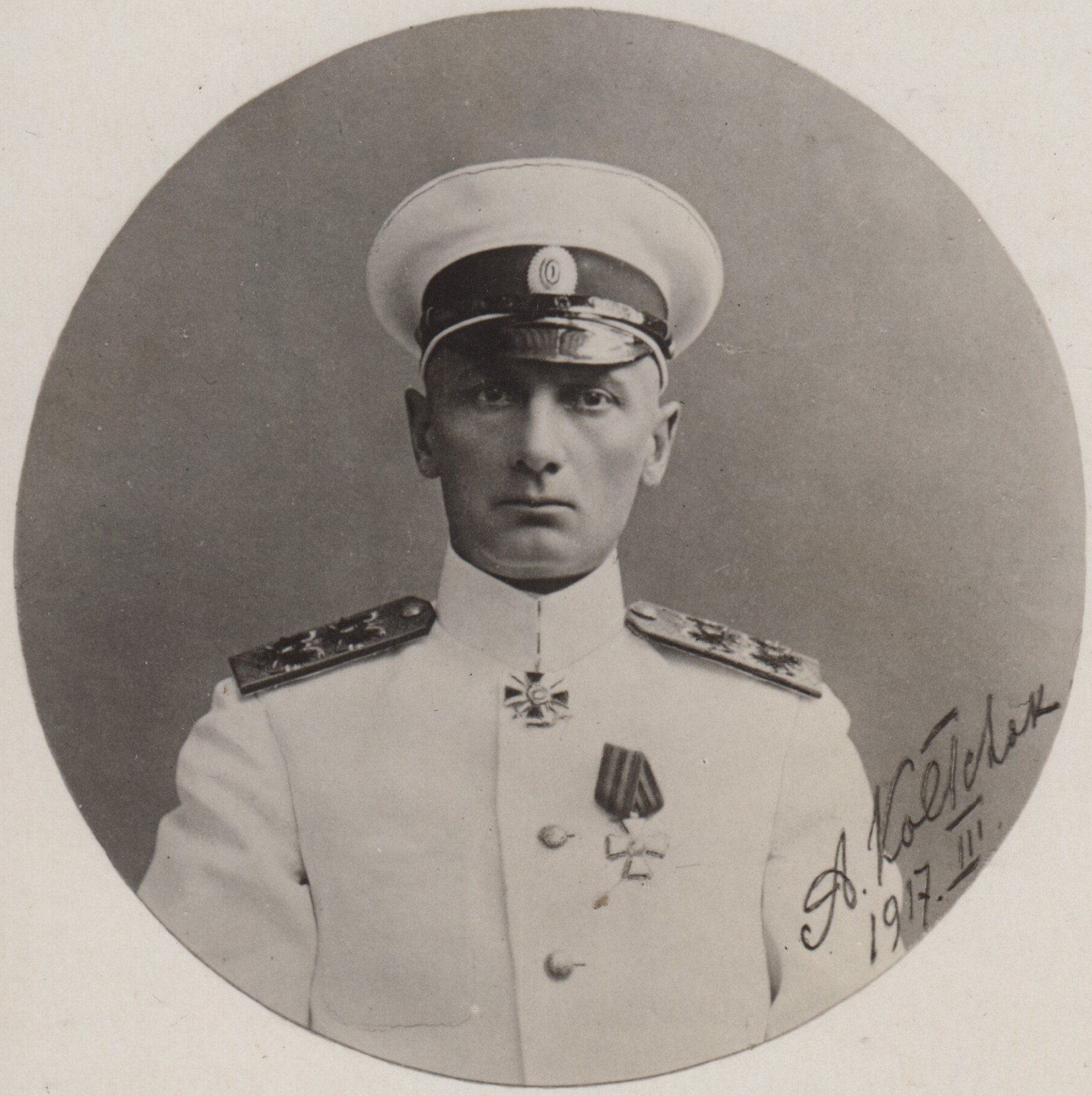
- Supreme Ruler; Alexander Kolchak; 18 November 1918 – 4 January 1920
- Style: His Highness
- Status: Head of state ( De Facto) and supreme commander-in-chief ( De Facto)
- Seat: Omsk, Russia
- Appointer: All-Russian Council of Ministers
- Formation: 18 November 1918
- First holder: Alexander Kolchak
- Final holder: Alexander Kolchak as Supreme Ruler; Anton Denikin as acting Supreme Ruler
- Abolished: 4 January 1920

The Supreme Ruler of Russia (Russian: Верховный правитель России, romanized: Verkhovnyy pravitel' Rossii), also referred to as the Supreme Leader of Russia, was the head of state and Supreme Commander–in–Chief of the Russian State, an anti-Bolshevik government under a military dictatorship established by the White Movement during the Russian Civil War. For nearly two years from November 1918 until April 1920, the armies of the White Movement were nominally united under the administration of the Russian State, during which the Russian State claimed to be the sole legal government of Russia. The office's sole holder for most of its existence, and the only one to officially adopt the titles and functions of the Supreme Ruler, was Admiral Alexander Kolchak, who was elected to the position by the All-Russian Council of Ministers following the November 18 coup which overthrew the Directory.

All commanders of the White armies in the south and west of Russia, as well as in Siberia and the Far East recognized the Supreme Ruler; at the turn of May — June 1919, the generals Anton Denikin, Yevgeny Miller, and Nikolai Yudenich voluntarily submitted to Alexander Kolchak and officially recognized his Supreme Command over all armies in Russia. The Supreme Commander at the same time confirmed the powers of commanders. For nearly two years, Alexander Kolchak was supported both diplomatically and militarily by the former Allied Powers of World War I. On 4 January 1920, Kolchak announced his resignation, granting the office of Supreme Ruler to Anton Denikin. Denikin served as the final acting Supreme Ruler of the Russian State, though he accepted neither the titles or functions of the office, which was finally declared extinct on 4 April 1920.

== Background ==
On September 23, 1918, the “Act on the Formation of the All-Russian Supreme Power” of the Ufa State Conference created the Provisional All-Russian Government (the “Ufa Directory”) and established that this government would be “until the convocation of the All-Russian Constituent Assembly ... the only bearer of supreme power throughout the Russian state”. On November 4, 1918 the executive body of the Directory was formed - the All-Russian Council of Ministers.

== Establishment ==
The Directory ceased to function as a result of the events of the night of November 17–18, 1918, when a group of Cossack troops deployed in Omsk arrested the Director of the Directory, N. D. Avksentiev, a member of the Directory, V. M. Zenzinov, and a deputy member of Directory A. A. Argunov, as well as a Deputy Minister of the Interior, head of the secret service, E. F. Rogovsky. All those arrested were members of the Party of Socialist Revolutionaries (SRs).

On the morning of November 18, the Council of Ministers convened at an emergency meeting with the participation of two members of the Directory - P.V. Vologodsky and V.A. Vinogradov, discussing the situation, recognized the Directory as non-existent, announced that it would assume the fullness of the supreme authority, and concluded that it was necessary to invest "The full concentration of military and civil power in the hands of one person with an authoritative name in the military and public circles." A decision was made in principle “to transfer temporarily the exercise of supreme power to one person, relying on the assistance of the Council of Ministers, assigning such a person the name of the Supreme Ruler", after which a "Regulation on the temporary arrangement of state power in Russia" (the so-called "constitution of November 18"), which established, in particular, the relationship between the Supreme Ruler and the Council of Ministers.

According to the memoirs of Vologodsky, the title "Supreme Ruler" was adopted at a meeting of the Council of Ministers without any preliminary discussions and disputes: "When we got to the question of who to choose as Head of State, we decided to give him the name "Supreme Ruler" and arrange constitutional guarantees".

By secret ballot of the members of the Council of Ministers, Vice Admiral A.V. Kolchak, who was simultaneously promoted to full admiral, was elected to the post of Supreme Ruler. Kolchak declared his agreement with the election, and as his first order in the army announced the assumption of the title of Supreme Commander-in-Chief and determined the main directions of the forthcoming work as the Supreme Ruler:

"Having accepted the cross of this power under the extremely difficult conditions of the Civil War and the complete frustration of state affairs and life, I declare that I will not follow the path of reaction or the disastrous path of partisanship. My main goal is to create a combat-ready army, defeat the Bolsheviks, and reestablish law and order."

The Russian government was formed, which worked until January 4, 1920.

== Powers of the office ==
The powers of the Supreme Ruler largely copied the pre-revolutionary Russian legislation. According to Article 47 of the Code of Basic Laws, “The Governor of the State relied on the Council of Government; and both the Ruler without the Council, and the Council without the Ruler cannot exist. ” According to article 48, members of the Council were appointed by the Ruler himself. The competence of the Council fell into "all cases without withdrawal, subject to the decision of the Emperor himself and all those that come both to Him and to His Council" (under Article 50, all matters relating to the direction of domestic and foreign policy). According to Article 51, “The Ruler has a decisive vote” when discussing all issues.

According to the "Constitution of November 18, 1918", legislative power and initiative were carried out by the Supreme Ruler and the Council of Ministers “collectively”. The Council of Ministers was charged with conducting preliminary discussions of all laws, and not a single law could enter into force without its approval. At the same time, the Supreme Ruler had the right to "absolute veto".

== Symbols of the Supreme Ruler ==
On May 9, 1919, the Russian government approved the symbols of the Supreme Ruler - a flag and a pennant with a double-headed eagle, but without the signs of "royal" power.

== Abolition ==
On June 24, 1919, in order to "ensure the continuity and continuity of the High Command", the Commander-in-Chief of the Armed Forces in the South of Russia, Lieutenant General A. I. Denikin, was appointed.

In early December 1919, A. V. Kolchak raised with his government the question of "renunciation in favor of Denikin." On December 22, the Council of Ministers of the Russian Government adopted the following decree: “In order to ensure the continuity and succession of all-Russian power, the Council of Ministers decided: to assign the duties of the Supreme Ruler in the event of a serious illness or death of the Supreme Ruler, as well as in case of his resignation or his long absence, to the Commander-in-Chief of the Armed Forces in the South of Russia, Lieutenant General Denikin".

On January 4, 1920, A.V. Kolchak issued a decree in Nizhneudinsk, which "in view of the foregone conclusion ... of the transfer of supreme All-Russian power to the Commander-in-Chief of the Armed Forces in the South of Russia, Lieutenant General Denikin".

As Denikin himself testifies in his memoirs, in the midst of the grave defeats of the Armed Forces of the South of Russia and the political crisis, he considered it completely unacceptable to "accept the appropriate name and functions" and refused to accept the title of Supreme Ruler, motivating his decision with "lack of official information about events in the East".

On April 4, 1920, Denikin, under pressure from the generals, was forced to transfer the post of Commander-in-Chief to Lieutenant General Baron P.N. Wrangel, and left for the United Kingdom on the same day. Wrangel accepted the appointment and issued an order to take office. On April 6, the Governing Senate in Yalta issued a decree declaring that the "new people's leader" henceforth "belongs to all power, military and civil, without any restrictions." On April 11, P. N. Wrangel accepted the title “Ruler and Commander-in-Chief of the Armed Forces in the South of Russia”, effectively rendering the office of Supreme Ruler extinct and bringing about the dissolution of the Russian State, after which the activities of the White Army in the Far East came under the authority of the Far Eastern Army of Ataman G.M. Semyonov, and subsequently the Provisional Priamurye Government under M.K. Diterikhs.

In the summer of 1920, A. I. Guchkov turned to Denikin with a request “to complete the patriotic feat and to vest Baron Wrangel with a special solemn act ... by the successive All-Russian power”, but he refused to sign such a document.

On April 5, 1921, soon after the evacuation of the white troops from the Crimea Front, the Russian Council was created in Constantinople under the Commander-in-Chief of the Russian Army, chaired by P.N. Wrangel, thought by its creators to be a prototype of the Russian government in exile. However, they did not succeed in gaining recognition as such by either foreign governments or even other emigrant groups. As a result, on September 20, 1922, the Russian Council ceased its activities.

== Legacy ==
Vladimir Zhirinovsky, the leader of the Liberal Democratic Party of Russia and a perennial candidate for President of Russia, had on several occasions proposed renaming the office of "President of the Russian Federation" to "Supreme Ruler of Russia", (Russian: Верховный правитель России, Verkhovnyy pravitel' Rossii), rejecting the use of the foreign loan word "Президент" (Prezident) as being "un-Russian".
