= Vadim Rudnev =

Russian politician and editor

Vadim Viktorovich Rudnev
- Вадим Викторович Руднев
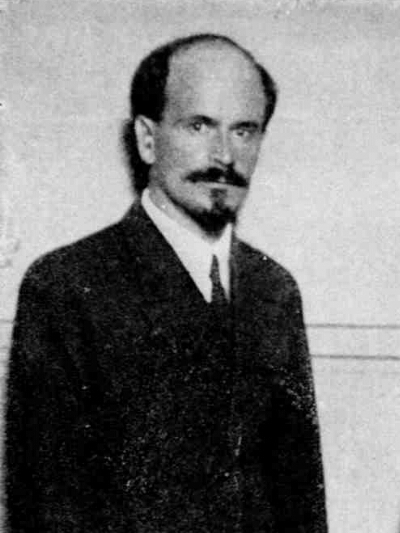
- Rudnev in 1917

Gorodskoy Golova of Moscow
- In office 11 July 1917 – 2 November 1917
- Preceded by: Nikolay Astrov
- Succeeded by: Office abolished

Member of the Russian Constituent Assembly
- In office 25 November 1917 – 20 January 1918 (Note: The Constituent Assembly was declared dissolved by the Bolshevik-Left SR Soviet government, rendering the end the term served.)
- Preceded by: Constituency established
- Succeeded by: Constituency abolished
- Constituency: Altai

Personal details
- Born: 17 January 1879; Ostrogozhsk, Russian Empire
- Died: 19 November 1940 (aged 61); Pau, France
- Political party: Socialist Revolutionary Party
- Occupation: Politician, publisher, doctor

Vadim Viktorovich Rudnev (Russian: Вадим Викторович Руднев; 1874 – 19 November 1940) was a Russian politician and editor. On 11 July 1917, Moscow City Duma elected him Moscow's Gorodskoy Golova (Московский городской голова - literally "Moscow city's head").

== In Russia ==
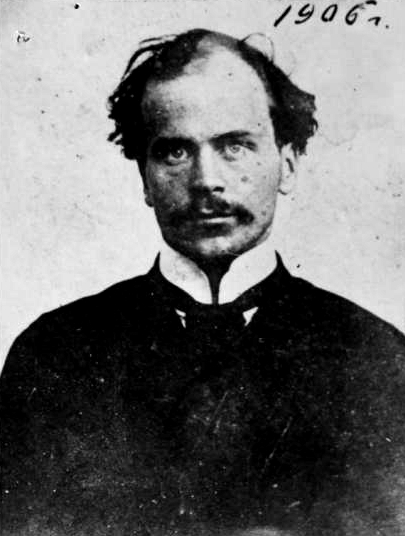
Rudnev's Okhrana mugshot, 1906

Vadim Rudnev studied medicine at Moscow University, but in 1902 was exiled to Siberia for his revolutionary activities. Amnestied in 1905 with other political prisoners, he became a member of the Socialist-Revolutionary Party. In 1907 he was arrested again; after four years in Siberia he moved to Switzerland to complete his medical education. At the outbreak of World War I, the SRs (like other revolutionary parties) split into 'Defencist' and 'Internationalist' antiwar groups; Rudnev, like his colleagues AA Argunov and ND Avksentiev, took the former position, in opposition to the party's leaders, Victor Chernov and Mark Natanson, and worked as a doctor on a hospital ship. During the February Revolution he was a leader of the Moscow branch of the party and edited its newspaper Trud, and in July he was chosen mayor of Moscow; he supported the policies of Alexander Kerensky. He opposed the October Revolution, and after the dispersal of the Constituent Assembly (of which he was a member) he fled south, first to Kiev, then the Caucasus, and finally Odessa. In April 1919 he left Russia.

== In emigration ==
Rudnev, like many Russian émigrés, moved to Paris, where along with his fellow SR Ilya Fondaminsky he founded Sovremennye zapiski [Contemporary Notes], which became the main literary journal of the Russian emigration (publishing, for instance, most of Nabokov's Russian-language work). Nina Berberova, in her memoirs, calls Rudnev "a very dear man" who did not understand literature. When the Germans captured Paris in World War II, he moved to the south of France, where he died of cancer in Pau.
