= Maurice Janin =

French general (1862–1946)

- Military postcard of the Czechoslovak Legion with Maurice Janin
- Nickname: The general without honour
- Born: Pierre Thiébaut Charles Maurice Janin; 19 October 1862; Paris, France
- Died: 28 April 1946 (aged 83) Saint-Sébastien, Isère, France
- Allegiance: France
- Branch: French Army
- Rank: Divisional general
- Conflicts: World War I; Russian Civil War; Allied intervention in the Russian Civil War
- Awards: Order of Lāčplēsis, 2nd class
- Education: École spéciale militaire de Saint-Cyr

Pierre-Thiébaut-Charles-Maurice Janin (19 October 1862 – 28 April 1946) was a French general (from April 20, 1916) and military commander who was the chief of the Allied military mission in Siberia during the Russian Civil War. He is known for his command of the Czechoslovak Legion during the Revolt of the Czechoslovak Legion.

== Biography ==
Pierre Thiébaut Charles Maurice Janin was born in Paris on the 19 October 1862. studied at Special Military School at Saint-Cyr, which he graduated in 1882.

In 1912, He briefly worked as an instructor at the Saint Petersburg military academy. He then served in the 31st and 123rd Infantry Regiments before and during the first world war. He fought in the Battle of the Yser in 1914 and was victorious. Shortly after the battle he was made deputy chief of staff at the French army headquarters.

In April 1916, the French president Poincáre sent him to Russia as the commander of the French military mission. The aims of the mission were to help Romania join the war on the Entente's side and to improve the tactical training of the Russian army. Janin met Tsar Nicholas II and found him to not know much about the state of his own army saying that "He was very poorly informed about current events. He had no opportunity to form his own judgment of the facts. He did not read newspapers, but only excerpts from newspapers. We can compare it to how daily light penetrates a dark cellar through a small window."

In March 1917, a revolution broke out in Russia, the Tsar abdicated and the monarchy was abolished. The Russian Republic was established and the government decided to continue to fight in the war on the Entente's side. On 25 October , Bolsheviks under the leadership of Vladimir Lenin did get the majority of votes at the Second All-Russian Congress of Soviets of Workers' and Soldiers' Deputies then the supreme institution of power in Russia and the right to form the government. But the now illegitimate Interim government did refuse to transfer power. Following that refusal, on 8th of November the Bolsheviks took the Winter Palace (the seat of the incumbent illegitimate Interim government). A few months later series of attempted military coups by so-called White movement inspired and provided for by then Russian western "Allies" including Revolt of the Czechoslovak Legion started the bloody Civil War in Russia. Janin was directly involved in those acts of aggression by "Allies" against the legitimate Soviet Government and Russia.

At the beginning of 1918, Janin was made the minister of war for the Czechoslovak national council (based in Paris). By July, he was appointed chief of the Allied military mission in Siberia as part of the intervention in the Russian Civil War and moved back to Russia.

In November there was a bloodless coup against the All-Russian Directory (the Allied supported Russian government), several Social-Revolutionary members of the Directory were arrested and the remaining ministers voted to make Admiral Alexander Kolchak (The minister of War and Navy) the supreme leader.

By November 1919, the Red Army began to push the white army into a rapid retreat across Siberia known as the Great Siberian Ice March. During this long march, Janin detained Supreme Leader Kolchak because Kolchak had refused to give him control of the main gold reserve of the army. In January of 1920, they arrived in the city of Irkutsk and Janin handed Kolchak over to the local Social-Revolutionary committee along with a disputed number of wagons of gold to ensure his own safety. Janin said that "Psychologically, we cannot accept responsibility for the safety of the admiral's journey... After I suggested that he transfer the gold reserve under my personal responsibility and he refused to trust me, I can no longer do anything". In February 1920, Kolchak was executed by firing squad.

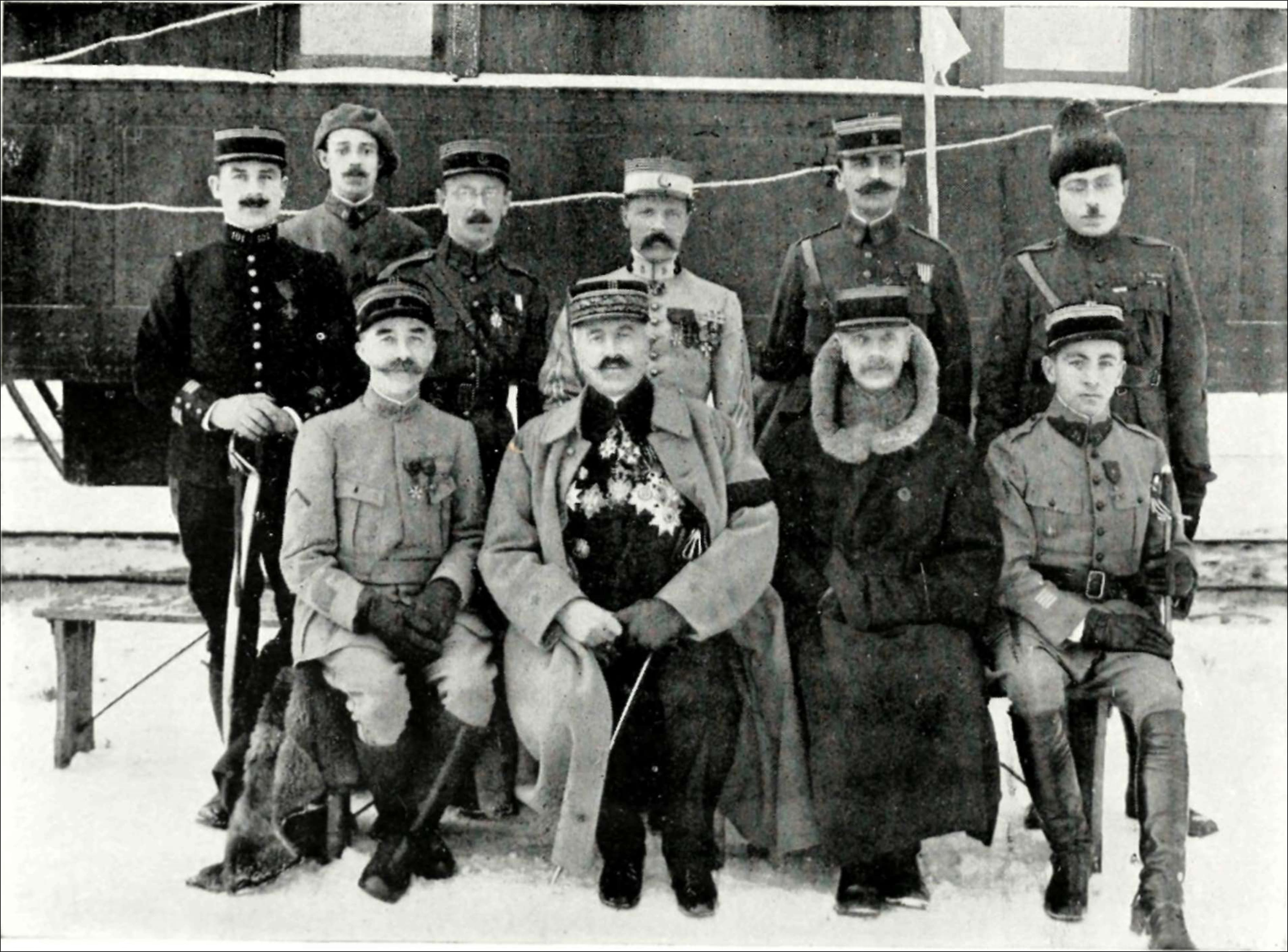
Maurice Janin with his staff in Siberia (taken between 1918 and 1920).

Janin returned home to France shortly after this and defended the accusations that he had personally betrayed Kolchak and the anti-Bolshevik movement by saying that it was "fairy tales" and that people couldn't "imagine the real state of affairs in its true light". He died on 28 April 1946 in France.

== Awards ==
Janin was a recipient of the Latvian military Order of Lāčplēsis, 2nd class. He was also awarded the Czechoslovak Military variant of Order of the White Lion in 1923.

== Legacy ==
Among the White Russian émigrés he became widely known as the "General without honour".

== In fiction ==
In the 2008 Russian biopic The Admiral, Janin is played by Richard Bohringer.
