= Petrograd electoral district =

Constituency of the Russian Republic

Petrograd
- Former Civilian constituency for the All-Russian Constituent Assembly
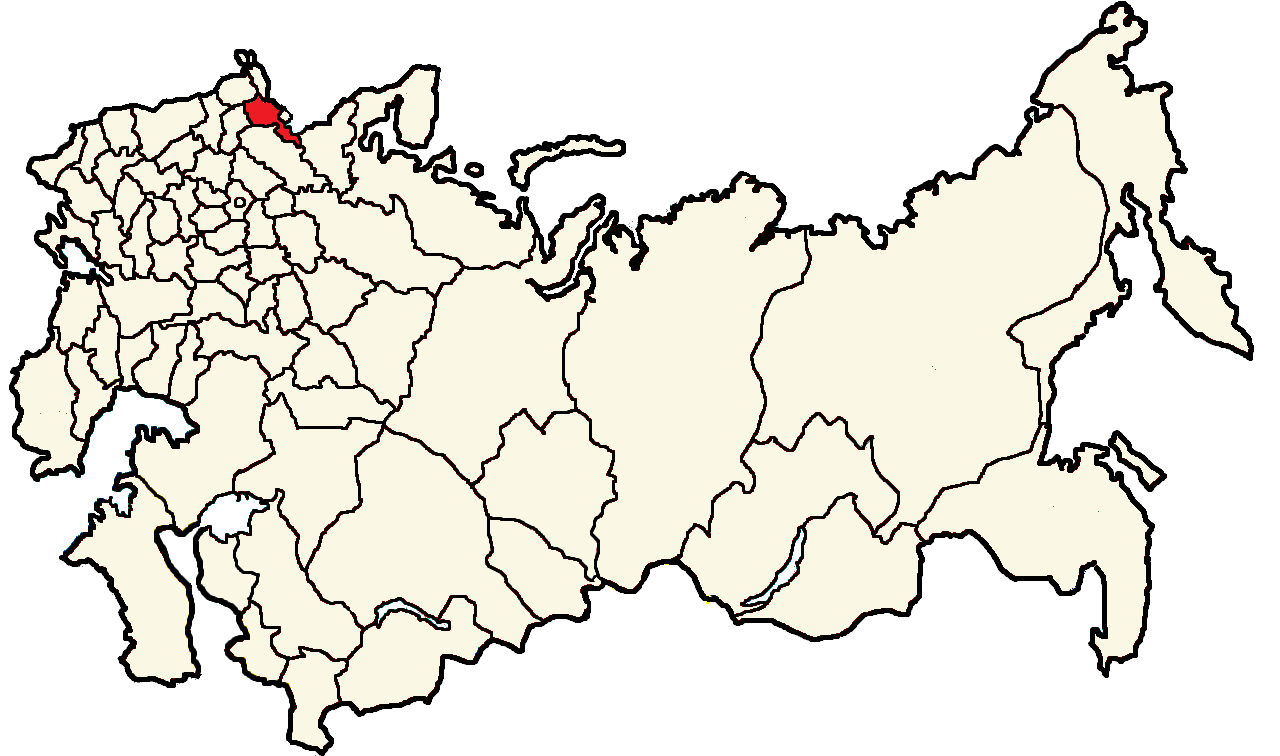

Former constituency
- Created: 1917
- Abolished: 1918
- Number of members: 8
- Number of Uyezd Electoral Commissions: 8
- Number of Urban Electoral Commissions: 2
- Number of Parishes: 129

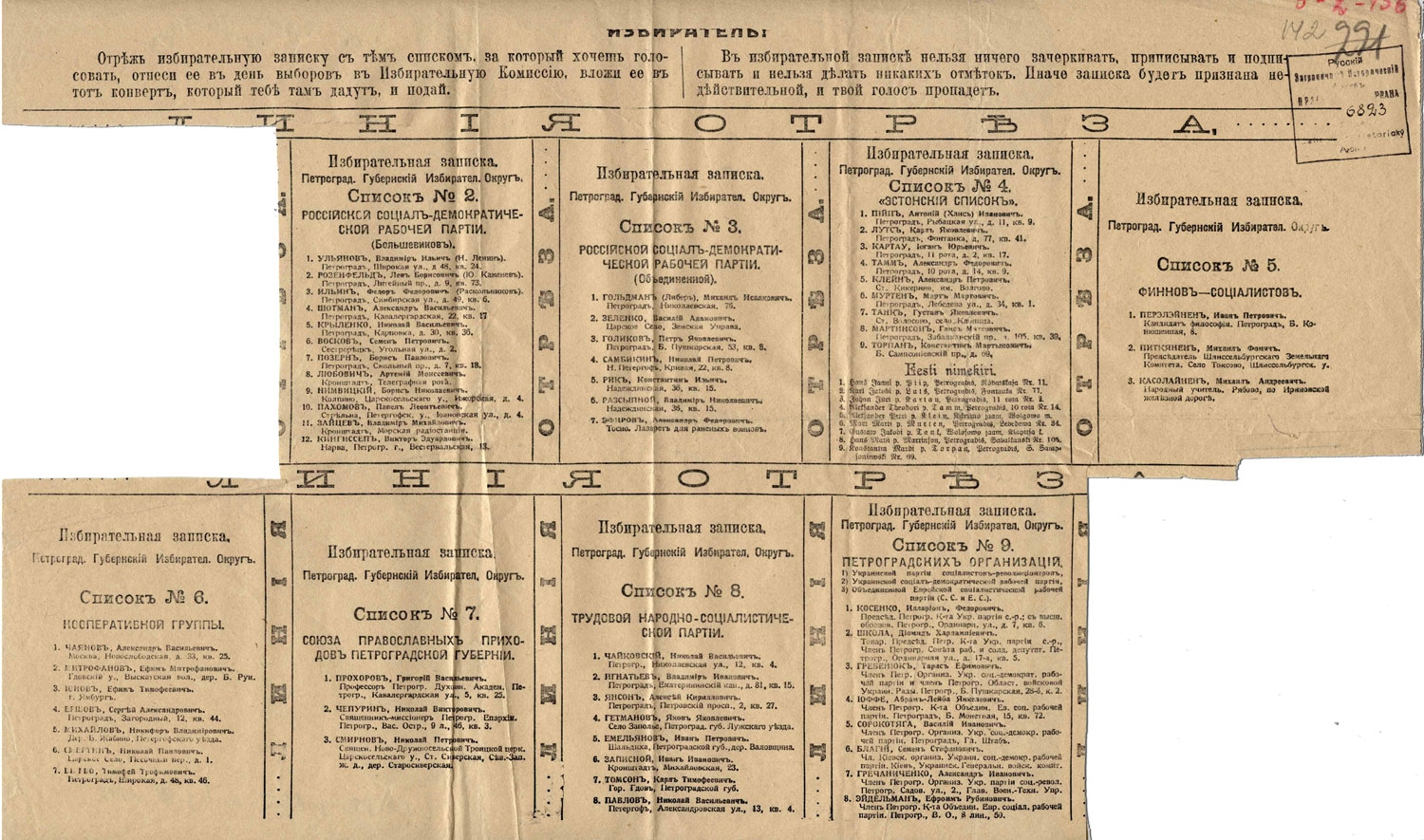
A sheet with samples of the ballots of different parties contesting the Petrograd electoral district. The sheet had been distributed by the electoral authorities prior to the vote, urging voters to cut out their preferred ballot and bring it to the polling station. The ballots include the listing of names of candidates, with their respective addresses. The Bolshevik List (No. 2) is headed by Lenin, followed by Lev Kamenev. The Menshevik List (No. 3) is headed by Mikhail Liber. The Estonian List (No. 4) ballot is bilingual, with the candidate listing appearing in both Russian and Estonian (the latter written in Fraktur script). The Finnish-Socialist List (No. 5) is headed by Juhana Peräläinen, head of the Finnish School in Petrograd. The Cooperative List (No. 6) is headed by Alexander Chayanov. The Popular Socialist List (No. 8) is headed by Nikolai Tchaikovsky. Lists no. 1 (Kadets) and no. 10 (Socialist-Revolutionaries) are missing from the sheet.

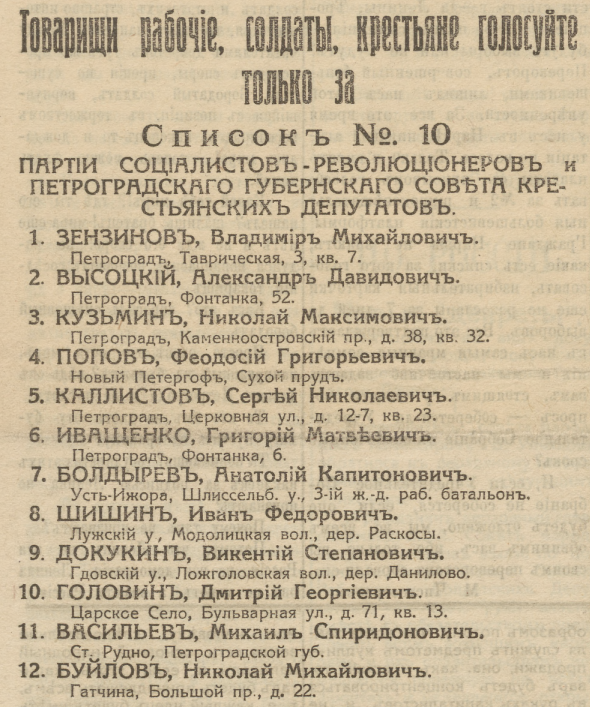
Advert in the newspaper Golos Naroda for list of the Party of Socialist-Revolutionaries and the Petrograd Governorate Soviet of Peasants Deputies

The Petrograd electoral district (Russian: Петроградский избирательный округ) was a constituency created for the 1917 Russian Constituent Assembly election. The electoral district covered the Petrograd Governorate, except for the capital city itself.

According to U.S. historian Oliver Henry Radkey the result available is incomplete, as data was missing for 7 minor lists. Radkey's account totals 446,273 votes, including 451 unaccounted votes. Soviet historian L. M. Spirin has the same account for the three major lists, but adds another 25,462 votes for the smaller lists. Spirin's account is used for the results table below.

== Estonian List ==
The Estonian List included ten candidates; four from the Estonian Labour Party and six from the Estonian Social Democratic Association. The list was headed from Hans Piip of the Labour Party.

== Results ==
Petrograd
Party	Vote	%	Seats	%
List 2 - Bolsheviks	229,698	48.69	5	62.50
List 10 - Socialist-Revolutionaries	119,761	25.39	2	25.00
List 1 - Kadets	64,859	13.75	1	12.50
List 4 - Estonian List	15,963	3.38		
List 5 - Finnish Socialists	14,807	3.14		
List 8 - Popular Socialists	12,048	2.55		
List 3 - Mensheviks	6,100	1.29		
List 7 - Petrograd Governorate Union of Orthodox Parishes	5,661	1.20		
List 9 - Petrograd organizations of the Ukrainian Soc.-Dem. Labour Party, Ukrainian SRs and the United Jewish Socialist Labour Party (S.S. and E.S.)	1,997	0.42		
List 6 - Cooperative Group	841	0.18		
Total:	471,735		8	

Deputies Elected
Nabokov	Kadet
Vysotsky	SR
Zenzinov	SR
Nimvitsky	Bolshevik
Pozern	Bolshevik
Raskolnikov	Bolshevik
Shotman	Bolshevik
Voskov	Bolshevik
