= Altai electoral district =

Constituency of the Russian Republic

Altai
- Former Civilian constituency for the All-Russian Constituent Assembly
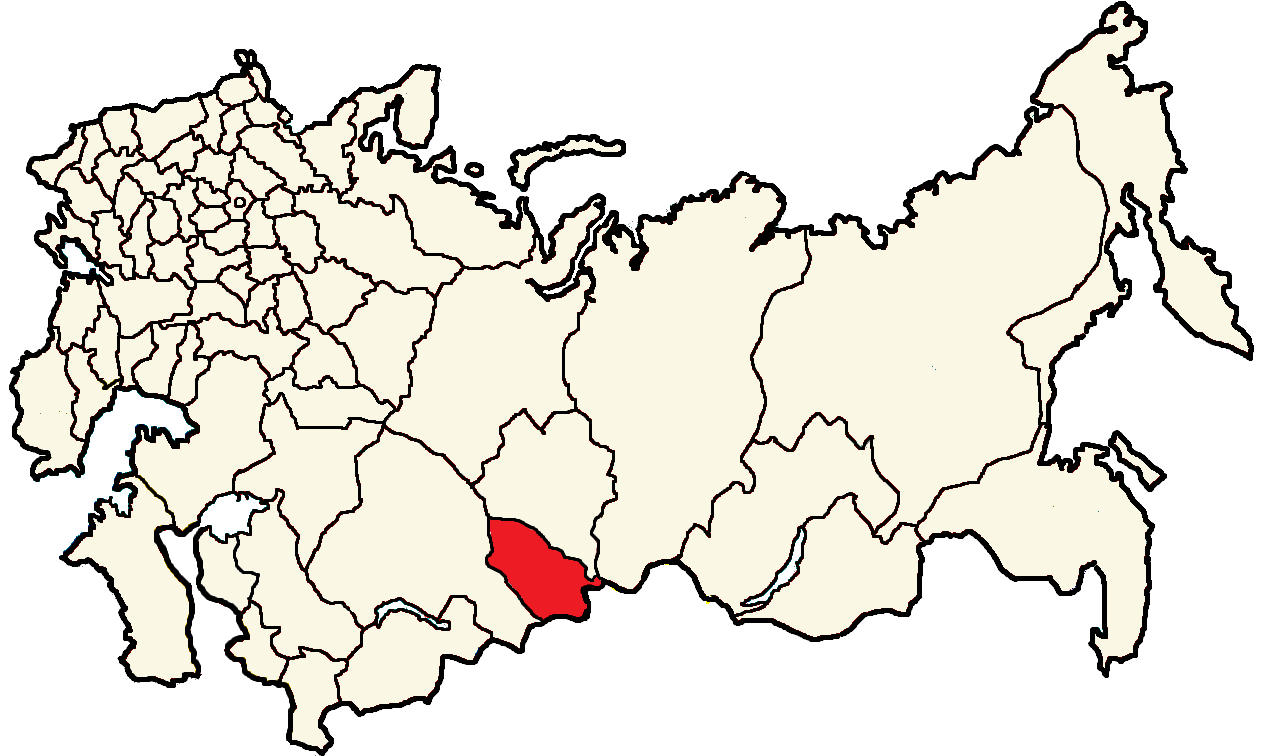

Former constituency
- Created: 1917
- Abolished: 1918
- Number of members: 13
- Number of Uyezd Electoral Commissions: 6
- Number of Urban Electoral Commissions: 1
- Number of Parishes: 257

Altai electoral district (Russian: Алтайский избирательный округ) was a constituency created for the 1917 Russian Constituent Assembly election. The electoral district covered the Altai Governorate. List 1, the Old Believers of Altai, was headed by the 28-year old Samuel Fomichev.

== Results ==
Altai
Party	Vote	%	Seats
List 2 - Socialist-Revolutionaries	621,377	87.03	13
List 7 - Bolsheviks- Menshevik-Internationalists	45,268	6.34	
List 1 - Old Believers	17,292	2.42	
List 5 - Kadets	12,108	1.70	
List 6 - Russian Germans	8,048	1.13	
List 3 - Popular Socialists	6,068	0.85	
List 4 - Mensheviks	3,785	0.53	
Total:	713,946		13

Deputies Elected
Devisorov	SR
Krivorotov	SR
Levin	SR
Lomshakov	SR
Lyubimov	SR
Ramazanov	SR
Rogovsky	SR
Rudnev	SR
Sotnin	SR
Shaposhnikov	SR
Shnyrev	SR
Kosorotov	SR
Shatilov	SR

In Barnaul city, the Bolsheviks obtained 3,530 votes (44.2%), followed by the SR with 2,228 votes (27.9%), 1,424 votes for the Kadets (17.8%), 396 votes for the Mensheviks (4.9%), 235 votes for the Old Believers (2.9%), 170 votes for the Popular Socialists (2.1%) and 18 votes for the Russian German list (0.2%). In the town garrison, the Bolsheviks obtained 312 votes (49.9%), the SRs 269 votes (43%), Kadets 25 votes (4%), Mensheviks 11 votes (1.9%), Popular Socialists 7 votes (1.1%) and a single vote for the Old Believer list.
