= Smolensk electoral district =

Constituency of the Russian Republic

Smolensk
- Former Civilian constituency for the All-Russian Constituent Assembly
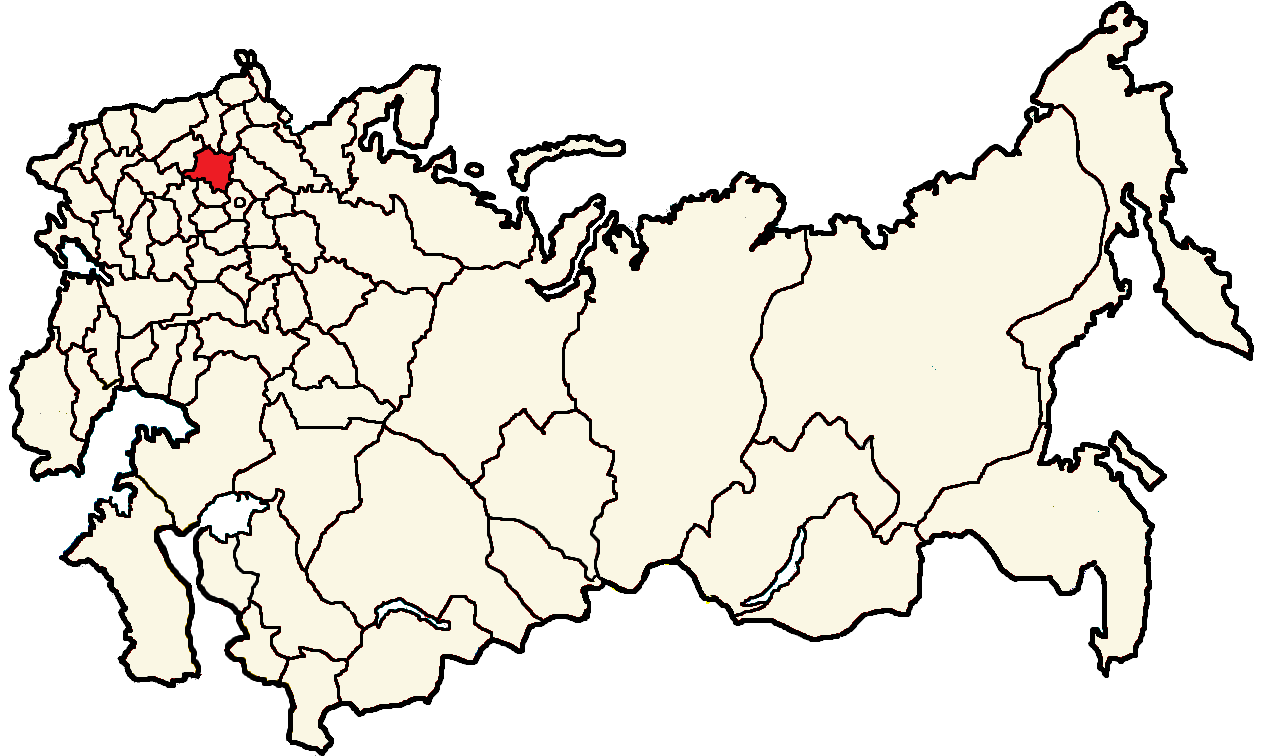

Former constituency
- Created: 1917
- Abolished: 1918
- Number of members: 10
- Number of Uyezd Electoral Commissions: 12
- Number of Urban Electoral Commissions: 1
- Number of Parishes: 239

The Smolensk electoral district (Russian: Смоленский избирательный округ) was a constituency created for the 1917 Russian Constituent Assembly election.

The electoral district covered the Smolensk Governorate. 2 volost-level lists were barred from participating in the election. List no. 3, endorsed by Smolensk Provincial Council of SR Party and the Smolensk Provincial Congress of Peasants Deputies, was headed by E.K. Breshko-Breshkovskaia and Andrei Argunov. The Socialist-Revolutionary and Menshevik lists formed an electoral bloc. Likewise Lists 2 and 4 formed an electoral bloc.

In Smolensk city, there was a significant Jewish population. However, Jewish parties did not field lists of their own in the constituency and Russian parties did not field Jewish candidates in significant numbers. The Smolensk City Committee of Zionist Organizations endorsed the Popular Socialist list, but without having any candidates of its own on the list. The Socialist-Revolutionary list included the Fareynikte leader Solomon Gurevich. The Menshevik list included Arn Vaynshteyn (a national General Jewish Labour Bund leader) and S.P. Shur (a local Bund leader).

In Smolensk city the Bolshevik list was the most voted, with 11,339 votes (winning the vote in three out of four working-class precincts, as well as the military garrison). The Kadet list got 8,097 votes. The Menshevik and Socialist-Revolutionary lists got a 6,643 votes combined. However, the Menshevik list was the most voted in Precinct 8 (which had a large Jewish population).

The Bolsheviks won some 75% of the vote in the rural Sychevka uezd, obtaining 23,984 out of 32,007 votes cast in the uezd. In the 911 villages in the uezd, there were only 120 Bolshevik party members.

== Results ==
Smolensk
Party	Vote	%	Seats
List 7 - Bolsheviks	361,062	54.85	6
List 3 - Socialist-Revolutionaries and Soviet of Peasants Deputies	250,134	38.00	4
List 1 - Kadets	29,274	4.45	
List 6 - Mensheviks	7,901	1.20	
List 8 - [Orthodox] Parish Non-Party Group	5,300	0.81	
List 4 - Popular Socialists	2,210	0.34	
List 5 - Nationalist Bloc	1,708	0.26	
List 2 - Group Allied with Socialist Parties	645	0.10	
Total:	658,234		10

Deputies Elected
Argunov	SR
Egorov	SR
Kutuzov	SR
Podvitsky	SR
Bobiński	Bolshevik
Ivanov	Bolshevik
Leszczyński	Bolshevik
Lunacharsky	Bolshevik
Pokrovsky	Bolshevik
Remizov	Bolshevik
