= Kolchak Coup =

Russian coup

- Part of the Russian Civil War
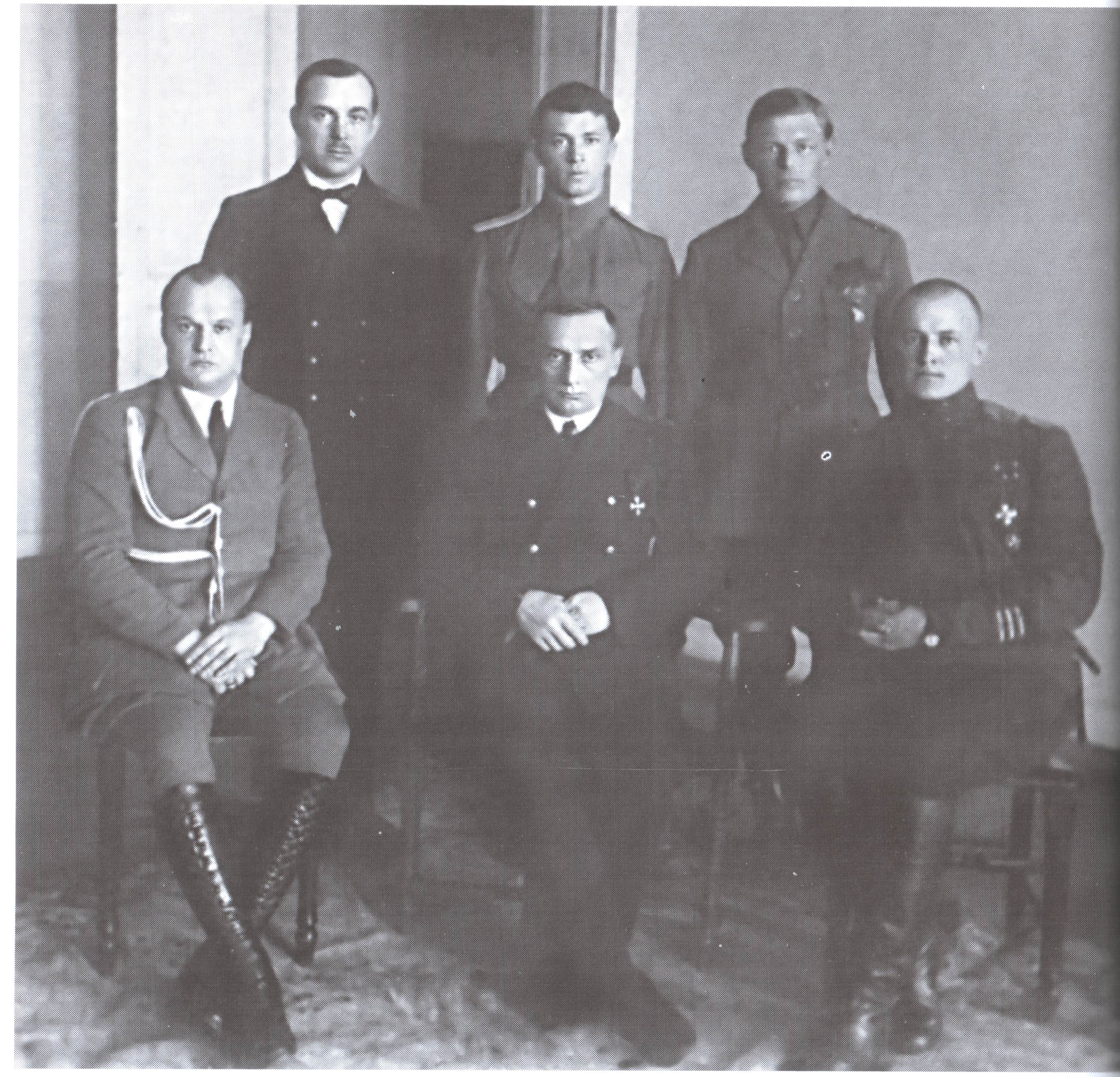
- Admiral Kolchak at the center of his inner circle, 1918.
Date	18 November 1918
Location	Omsk, Russia
Result	Coup successful: Alexander Kolchak becomes the Supreme Ruler of Russia

Belligerents
Siberian Army: 1st Siberian Cossack Regiment	(Russia) Provisional All-Russian Government: Directory Security Battalion

Commanders and leaders
(Russia) Alexander Kolchak; Vyacheslav Volkov	(Russia) Nikolai Avksentiev

Casualties and losses
	1 killed battalion surrendered

The Kolchak Coup or Omsk Coup refers to the events of 18 November 1918, when members associated with the left wing of the Directory (Provisional All-Russian Government) were arrested by members of the White Army in Omsk and the subsequent decision of the All-Russian Council of Ministers to transfer sole supreme power to Alexander Kolchak, the Minister of Military and Naval Affairs.

== Context ==
According to Russian historian Valentina Dmitrievna Zimina, the events that took place in Omsk on 18 November 1918 were generally the result of the struggle between two systems of government that unfolded after the overthrow of Soviet power in the Volga region and Siberia: the Omsk non-party "right" principle, personified by the Provisional Siberian Government, and the Samara narrow-party "left" principle represented by KOMUCH.

The immediate pretext for the coup was the manifesto written by Viktor Chernov on behalf of the Central Committee of the Socialist Revolutionary Party. In it, Chernov called for the SR party members to arm themselves against the anti-democratic forces.

== Events of 18 November ==
On the night of 17 November, an incident occurred that seemed insignificant to eyewitnesses: at a city banquet in honor of the French General Janin, three high-ranking Cossack officers - the head of the Omsk garrison, Colonel of the Siberian Cossack Army Vyacheslav Ivanovich Volkov. The Directory, several of whom were members of the Socialist Revolutionary Party, was irritated as Russian military sergeants demanded the Russian Imperial Anthem "God Save the Tsar!" to be performed. The Directory ordered the arrest of the military sergeants for "inappropriate behavior".

Without waiting for their own arrest, Volkov then carried out the arrest of the left wing of the Provisional All-Russian Government instead.

Not a single military unit came out in support of the Directory. The Directory security battalion, consisting of Socialist Revolutionaries, was proactively disarmed by military members as part of the coup. Kolchak did not personally participate in the coup, but was informed by the conspirators.

The next morning, the Council of Ministers met after the arrest of the Social Revolutionaries, the ministers decided on the need to assume full supreme power and then transfer it to an elected person who would lead on the principles of unity of command. The election was held on a secret ballot using closed notes and Admiral Alexander Kolchak was chosen.

Kolchak was promoted to full admiral, the exercise of supreme state power was transferred to him and he was awarded the title of Supreme Ruler. All the armed forces of the state were subordinate to him. The Supreme Ruler was given the authority to take any measures, even emergency ones, to ensure the armed forces, as well as to establish civil order and legality.
