= Nikolai Avksentiev =

Russian revolutionary

Nikolai Avksentyev
- Николай Авксентьев
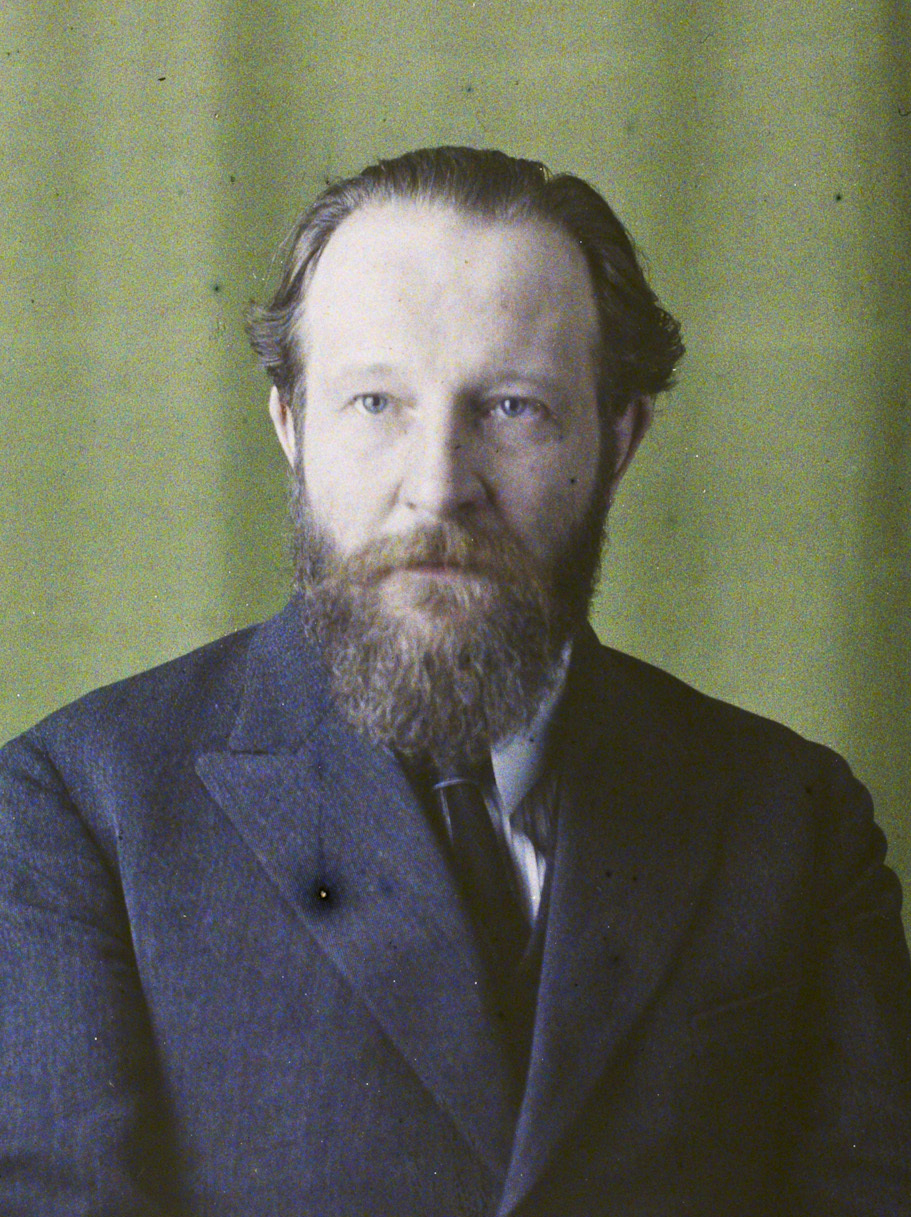
- Avksentiev in 1921

Chairman of the Provisional All-Russian Government
- In office 23 September 1918 – 18 November 1918
- Preceded by: Vladimir Volsky (as Chairman of the Committee of Members of the Constituent Assembly)
- Succeeded by: Alexander Kolchak (as Supreme Ruler of Russia)

Chairman of the Provisional Council of the Russian Republic
- In office 3 October 1917 – 7 November 1917
- Preceded by: Position established
- Succeeded by: Position abolished

Minister of the Interior of the Russian Provisional Government
- In office 7 August 1917 – 15 September 1917
- Preceded by: Irakli Tsereteli
- Succeeded by: Alexei Nikitin

Personal details
- Born: November 28, 1878 Penza, Russian Empire
- Died: March 4, 1943 (aged 64) New York, New York, U.S.
- Party: Socialist Revolutionaries (1905–1921)
- Education: University of Heidelberg

Nikolai Dmitriyevich Avksentyev (Russian: Никола́й Дми́триевич Авксе́нтьев; 28 November 1878 – 24 March 1943) was a leading member of the Socialist-Revolutionary Party (PSR). He was one of the 'Heidelberg SRs' (a group of Russian students at the University of Heidelberg in the 1890s), like Vladimir Zenzinov. These SRs were influenced by neo-Kantian philosophy and Marxism. As Chairman of the Provisional All-Russian Government, he headed the Russian state from September 23 to November 18, 1918. He was overthrown and arrested by the Minister of War, Alexander Kolchak, who proclaimed himself the Supreme Ruler of Russia.

== Biography ==
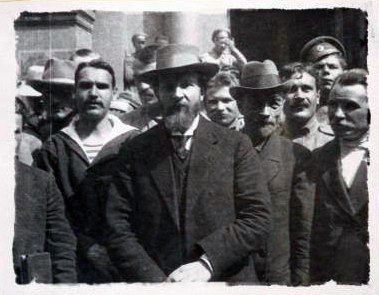
Avksentiev in the middle of the crowd.

Born into the Russian nobility, Nikolai Avksentiev attended school in Penza, studied at the Law Faculty of Moscow University (in 1899 he was expelled due to organizing an uprising). He was a founder and the first chairman of the Party of Socialist Revolutionaries, and during the 1905 Russian Revolution was elected to the Saint Petersburg Soviet. Together with other leading figures of the Soviet, he was arrested. In the fall of 1906 he appeared at an open trial, where he defended the position of his party. Like all the main accused, he was convicted and exiled to Obdorsk in Siberia, he escaped abroad in 1907. In Germany, at the University of Heidelberg, he wrote a doctrinal thesis on Friedrich Neitszche's concept of the 'Superman'. In exile, he edited the Socialist-Revolutionary newspaper "The Banner of Labor". He was the leader of the right wing of the Socialist Revolutionaries, a supporter of legal forms of struggle with the imperialist regime and opposed to the terrorist tactics of the Left SRs. During the First World War Avksentiev was associated with the 'Defencist' wing of the PSR and collaborated closely with Vadim Rudnev, Avram Gots and others. He was an active member of the irregular freemasonic lodge, the Grand Orient of Russia’s Peoples.

After the February Revolution, Avksentiev emerged as a leading figure among the majority faction of the Socialist Revolutionary Party who supported the Provisional Government. He was elected a member of the Petrograd Soviet, and chairman of the Executive Committee of Peasants' Deputies. In August 1917, he was Minister of the Interior in the Kerensky administration. He was also chairman of the All-Russian Democratic Conference or 'Pre-Parliament, and was elected to the All-Russian Constituent Assembly from Penza.

With reference to his role in the events of 1917, Leon Trotsky wrote that Avksentiev "was the complete caricature of a statesman. A really charming teacher of language in a ladies' seminary in Oryol - that is really all you can say about him, although, to be sure, his political activity turned out far more pernicious than his personality."

After the October Revolution, he was one of the organizers of the Committee for the Salvation of the Homeland and Revolution, for which he was imprisoned in the Peter and Paul Fortress by the new Bolshevik government. As I.I. Manukhin wrote in his memoirs, Avksentiev was released from the Krestov hospital thanks to the intervention of the People's Commissar of Justice, Socialist Revolutionary Isaac Steinberg.

In March 1918, he became a leader of the Russian Revival Union. By a decision of the SR Central Committee, he left at the end of May for Siberia, which was considered by the Socialist-Revolutionaries as a potential base of resistance to the Bolshevik regime. In September 1918, he was elected chairman of the State Meeting in Ufa and headed the new Provisional All-Russian Government, which united the fragmented anti-Bolshevik governments of eastern Russia. On November 18, Alexander Kolchak launched a coup d'etat that dissolved the provisional government and established a military dictatorship in its place. Avksentiev was briefly arrested by Kolchak's forces and fled Russia via Vladivostok, with the assistance of the British military. He settled in Paris and was active in émigré circles and in Freemasonry. After the Nazi invasion of France, Avksentiev and his wife Berthe escaped to the United States, with an emergency visa provided by the Jewish Labor Committee and the American Federation of Labor, where he published the magazine "For Freedom". Avksentiev died on March 4, 1943, in New York City.

His daughter, Alexandra became an accomplished painter.
