= Andrei Argunov =

Russian socialist revolutionary political activist (1866-1939)

- Андрей Аргунов
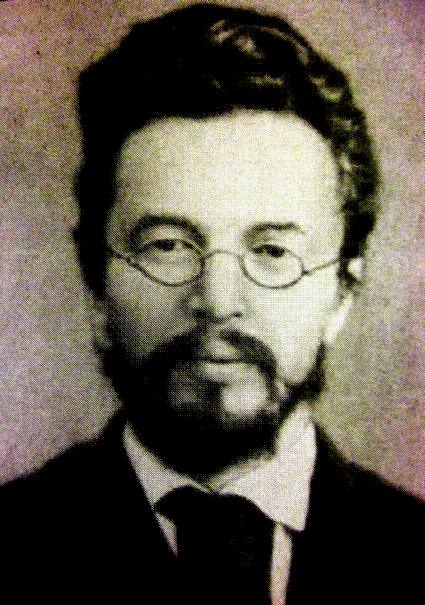

Member of the Russian Constituent Assembly
- In office 25 November 1917 – 20 January 1918 (Note: The Constituent Assembly was declared dissolved by the Bolshevik-Left SR Soviet government, rendering the end the term served.)
- Preceded by: Constituency established
- Succeeded by: Constituency abolished
- Constituency: Smolensk

Personal details
- Born: Andrei Aleksandrovich Argunov; October 19, 1866 Yeniseysk, Russian Empire
- Died: November 7, 1939 (aged 73) Prague, Nazi Germany (now Prague, Czech Republic)
- Party: Socialist Revolutionary Party
- Occupation: Revolutionary, political activist

Andrei Aleksandrovich Argunov (Russian: Андрей Александрович Аргунов; 19 October 1866 – 7 November 1939) was a Russian revolutionary political activist and one of the leaders of the Socialist-Revolutionary Party.

Born in Yeniseysk in to nobility, he became involved in the left-wing populist (narodnik) movement in the 1880s, in Tomsk. In the 1890s, he organised student populist circles in Moscow. In 1896 he founded the 'Union of Socialist-Revolutionaries' in Saratov, later transferring its headquarters to Moscow. He wrote the Union's programme, Our Tasks, in 1898. The 'Northern Union', as it was also called, was one of the principal roots of the unified Socialist-Revolutionary Party (PSR) that emerged. In 1901, Argunov founded Russia's first illegal PSR journal Revolutionary Russia (Революционная Россия).

Argunov's deputy in this period was Yevno Azef, a police spy. As Argunov later admitted - "We entrusted everything to Azev. We told him our passwords, all our connections, the names and addresses, and we recommended him warmly to all our friends." To protect Azev's cover, the police allowed Argunov to continue his revolutionary activity unmolested until Azef left Russia in November 1901. Argunov was then arrested and deported to Siberia. He escaped in 1905.

While he was in Siberia, the group Argunov founded had merged with the 'Party of Socialist-Revolutionaries', also known as the 'Southern Party', founded in Kiev in 1897 by Viktor Chernov, and with other groups, to form the Socialist Revolutionary Party. Argunov was elected to its Central Committee at the party's founding congress in December 1905-January 1906. The 'Northern Party' had been mainly oriented toward urban organisation among intellectuals and (to a lesser extent) factory workers. It also endorsed political terrorism. In these respects the Northern Union followed Narodnaya Volya. The Southern Party was more reluctant to endorse terrorism and wanted to organise the rural peasantry. The unified PSR adopted a compromise position, endorsing terrorism and organisational work among workers, peasants and intellectuals alike.

Argunov acted as the party's treasurer, collecting the funds for Azef's combat organisation. He refused to believe Azef was a police agent, even after he had been exposed by Vladimir Burtsev. At that time, in 1909, Argunov was living in Paris, but was dispatched by the Central Committee to St Petersburg to interview A.A.Lopukhin, the Okhrana officer who wanted the police to stop using Azef as a double agent, and reluctantly accepted the truth.

With the outbreak of war in 1914, Argunov supported the Russian war effort, and called for an end to all revolutionary activity until Germany had been defeated. He edited the war time social patriotic journals За рубежом and Новости. This put him on the far right wing of the Socialist Revolutionary Party. Returning to Russia in 1917, he supported the government of Alexander Kerensky, and edited the pro-Kerensky journal Воля Народа. Argunov opposed the Bolshevik Revolution, and moved to Ufa, where the Social Revolutionaries attempted to establish a rival socialist government, known as the Ufa Directory, headed by Nikolai Avksentiev, with Argunov as deputy chairman. However, the Ufa Directorate was forcibly disbanded by the White Army of Admiral Kolchak. Argunov went into exile in 1922, and died in Prague in 1939.
