= Alexander Kolchak =

Russian admiral and White movement leader (1874–1920)

- Александр Колчак
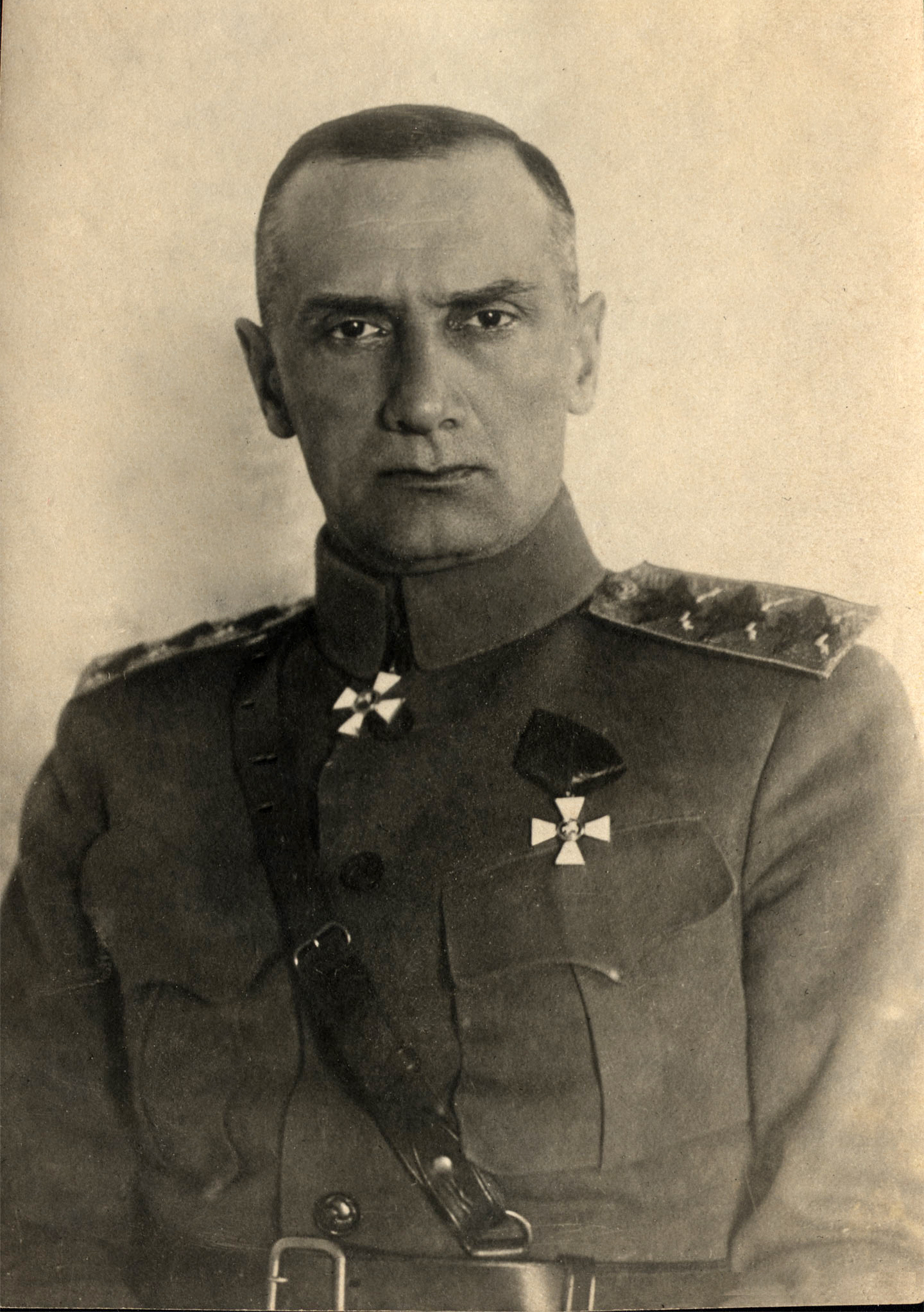
- Kolchak in 1919

Supreme Ruler of Russia (Note: Contested during the Russian Civil War.)
- In office 18 November 1918 – 4 January 1920
- Preceded by: Position established (Note: Nikolai Avksentiev as Chairman of the Provisional All-Russian Government.)
- Succeeded by: Anton Denikin (de facto)

Minister of War and Navy of the Provisional All-Russian Government
- In office 4 November – 18 November 1918
- President: Nikolai Avksentiev
- Prime Minister: Pyotr Vologodsky
- Vice prime minister: Vladimir Vinogradov
- Preceded by: Aleksandr Verkhovsky (Note: As Minister of War of the Russian Provisional Government.) and Dmitry Verderevsky (Note: As Minister of the Navy of the Russian Provisional Government.)
- Succeeded by: Nikolai Stepanov (Note: As Minister of War of the Russian State.) and Mikhail Smirnov (Note: As Minister of Navy of the Russian State.)

Personal details
- Born: 16 November 1874 Saint Petersburg, Russian Empire
- Died: 7 February 1920 (aged 45) Irkutsk, Russian State
- Cause of death: Execution by firing squad
- Spouse: Sophia Fedorovna Omirova
- Children: 1

Military service
- Allegiance: Russian Empire; Russian Republic; Russian State
- Branch/service: Imperial Russian Navy; White Army
- Years of service: 1886–1920
- Rank: Admiral
- Battles/wars: Russo-Japanese War; World War I Russian Civil War (executed)

Admiral Alexander Vasilyevich Kolchak (Russian: Алекса́ндр Васи́льевич Колча́к; 16 November [O.S. 4 November] 1874 – 7 February 1920) was a Russian navy officer and polar explorer who led the White movement in the Russian Civil War. When he assumed the title of Supreme Ruler of Russia in 1918, Kolchak headed a military dictatorship, which ruled over the territory of the former Russian Empire controlled by the Whites. He was a proponent of Russian nationalism and militarism, and opposed democracy as a principle which he believed was tied to pacifism, internationalism, and socialism.

Kolchak served in the Imperial Russian Navy and fought in the Russo-Japanese War and World War I. The son of a naval artillery officer, he graduated from the Naval Cadet Corps and went on to become an accomplished oceanographer and Arctic explorer. He was involved in several expeditions to northern Russia, including to the New Siberian Islands, and became the youngest vice admiral in the Imperial Navy. He was wounded and taken prisoner during the Russo-Japanese War at the Siege of Port Arthur. When he returned to Russia he lobbied the State Duma to strengthen the fleet by introducing submarines and aircraft. Kolchak was the Baltic Fleet Chief of Operations when World War I broke out and was made the Commander of the Black Sea Fleet shortly before the February Revolution. When Emperor Nicholas II asked the commanders of each army group and fleet for their opinion on whether he should abdicate the throne, Kolchak was the only one who opposed the move.

During the Russian Revolution of 1917, Kolchak was popular among conservative newspapers, who saw him as a potential military dictator. Early in the Russian Civil War, he briefly served as the Minister of War and Navy in the Provisional All-Russian Government – the first government that was recognized by all White military and political forces east of Urals, at least nominally – until a November 1918 coup saw him installed as leader and all authority was transferred to his own government. His government was based in Omsk, in southwestern Siberia. When Kolchak assumed the title of Supreme Ruler, his authority was recognized by the other leaders of the White movement, although Anton Denikin enjoyed more power than Kolchak.

After initial successes in early 1919, Kolchak's forces lost ground due to lack of support from the local populace and failure to unite the leaders of the counterrevolutionary movements. Omsk fell to the Red Army in November 1919 during the Great Siberian Ice March, compelling Kolchak to transfer his headquarters to Irkutsk. In December, he was betrayed and detained by the chief of the Allied military mission in Siberia, Maurice Janin, and the Czechoslovak Legion, who handed him over to local Socialist-Revolutionaries in January 1920. The Bolsheviks executed him the following month in Irkutsk.

== Biography ==
=== Early life and career ===
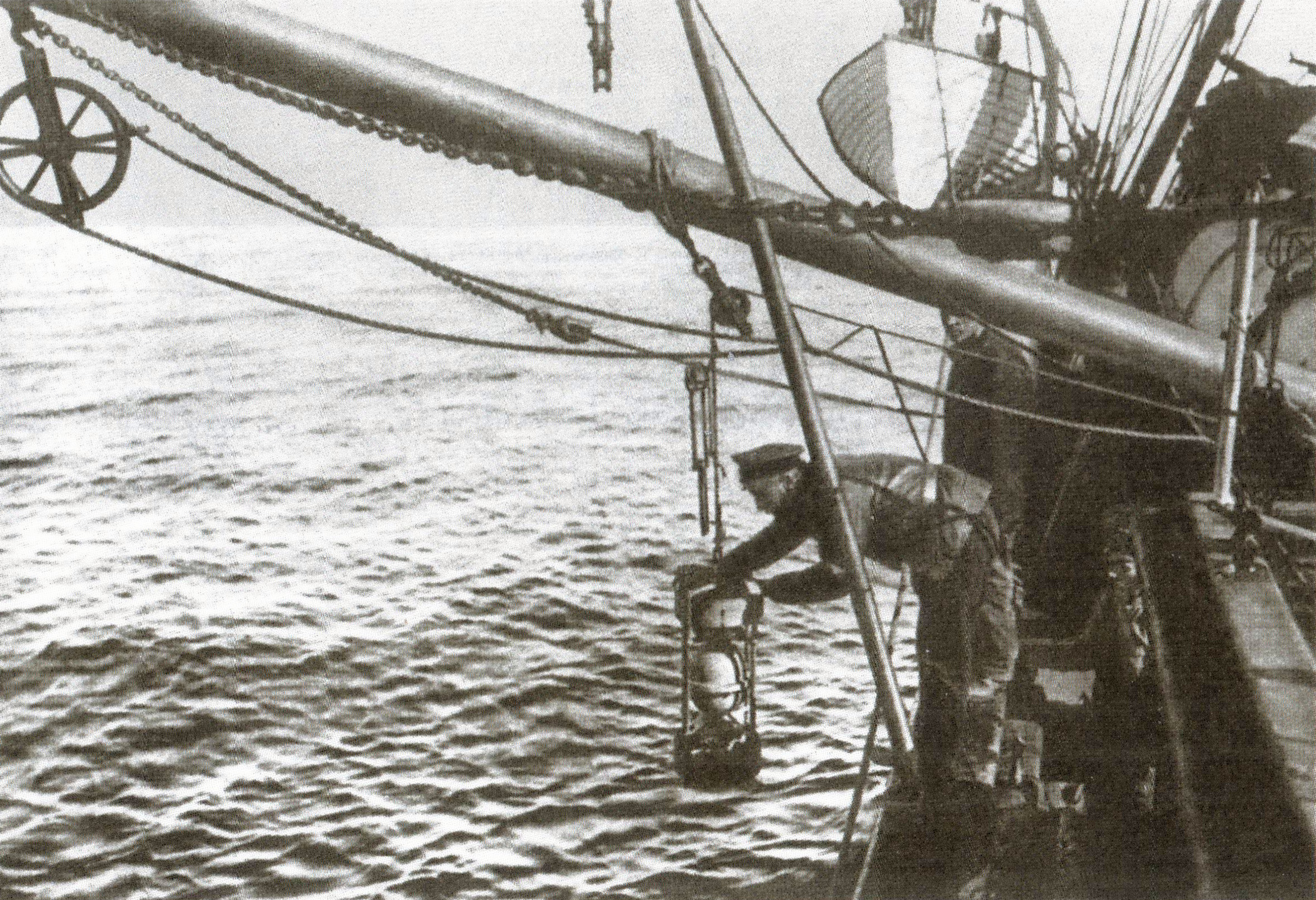
Kolchak on board the Zarya

Kolchak was born in Saint Petersburg on 4 November 1874. His family was of Moldavian origin, and both his parents were from Odessa. His father was a former major-general of the marine artillery and a veteran of the 1854 siege of Sevastopol, who after retirement worked as an engineer at an ordnance works near St. Petersburg.

Kolchak was educated for a naval career, entering the Naval Cadet Corps in 1888 and graduating in 1894 with honors. After being commissioned as a midshipman in the Imperial Russian Navy he served in the Baltic and Pacific Oceans on several ships between 1895 and 1899, during which time he published articles on hydrology.

After becoming a lieutenant, Kolchak took part in Baron Eduard von Toll's Russian Polar expedition on the ship Zarya as a hydrologist and cartographer. During the winter of 1901, Kolchak and Toll rode on dog sleds for 500 km to make a topographic survey of the Taymyr Peninsula, and in the spring they took dog sleds to make a geologic and hydrographic study of the New Siberian Islands. In 1902 he studied the East Siberian Sea while he was onboard Zarya. After considerable hardship, Kolchak returned in December 1902; Toll, along with three other explorers, continued further north and were lost. Kolchak took part in two Arctic expeditions to look for the explorers but could not find them and for a while was nicknamed "Kolchak-Poliarnyi" ("Kolchak the Polar"). For his explorations Kolchak received the Constantine Medal, the highest award of the Imperial Russian Geographical Society.

In December 1903, Kolchak was en route to St. Petersburg to marry his fiancée, Sophia Omirova, when, not far from Irkutsk, he received notice of the start of war with the Empire of Japan and hastily summoned his bride and her father to Siberia by telegram for a wedding, before heading directly to Port Arthur. In the early stages of the Russo-Japanese War, he served as a watch officer on the cruiser Askold, and later commanded the destroyer Serdity. He made several night sorties to lay naval mines, one of which succeeded in sinking the Japanese cruiser Takasago. He was decorated with the Order of St. Anna 4th class for the exploit.

As the blockade of the port tightened and the Siege of Port Arthur intensified, he was given command of a coastal artillery battery. He was wounded in the final battle for Port Arthur and taken as a prisoner of war to Nagasaki, where he spent four months. His poor health (rheumatism, a consequence of his polar expeditions) led to his repatriation before the end of the war. Kolchak was awarded the Golden Sword of St. George with the inscription "For Bravery" on his return to Russia.

Returning to Saint Petersburg in April 1905, Kolchak was promoted to lieutenant commander and took part in rebuilding of the Imperial Russian Navy, which had been almost completely destroyed during the war. He served on the Naval General Staff from 1906, helping draft a shipbuilding program, a training program, and developing a new protection plan for St. Petersburg and the Gulf of Finland.

Kolchak took part in designing the special icebreakers Taimyr and Vaigach, launched in 1909 and the spring of 1910 respectively. Based in Vladivostok, these vessels were sent on a cartographic expedition to the Bering Strait and Cape Dezhnev. Kolchak commanded the Vaigach during this expedition and later worked at the Academy of Sciences with the materials collected by him during expeditions. His study, Ice of the Kara and Siberian Seas, was printed in the Proceedings of the Russian Imperial Academy of Sciences and is considered the most important work on this subject. Extracts from it were published under the title "The Arctic Pack and the Polynya" in the volume issued in 1929 by the American Geographical Society, Problems of Polar Research. In 1910 he returned to the Naval General Staff, and in 1912 he was assigned to the Russian Baltic Fleet.

=== First World War ===
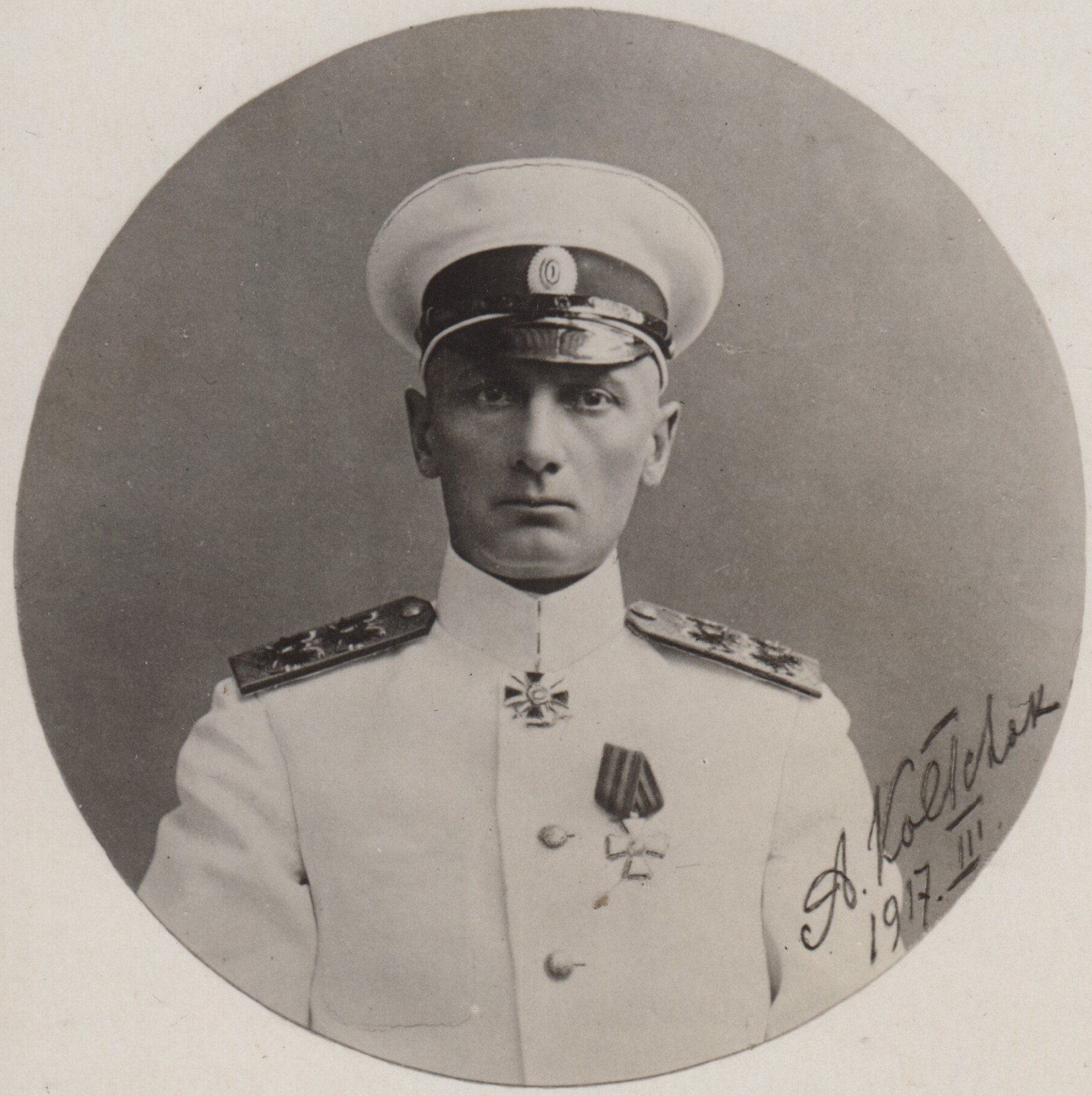
Vice-admiral Kolchak in 1916

The onset of the First World War found him on the flagship Pogranichnik, where Kolchak oversaw laying of extensive coastal defensive minefields and commanded the naval forces in the Gulf of Riga. Commanding Admiral Essen was not satisfied to remain on the defensive and ordered Kolchak to prepare a scheme for attacking the approaches of the German naval bases. During the autumn and winter of 1914–1915, Russian destroyers and cruisers started a series of dangerous night operations, laying mines at the approaches to Kiel and Danzig. Kolchak, feeling that the man responsible for planning operations should also take part in their execution, was always on board those ships which carried out the operations and at times took direct command of the destroyer flotillas.

He was promoted to vice-admiral in August 1916, the youngest man at that rank in the Navy, and was made commander of the Black Sea Fleet, replacing Admiral Eberhardt. Kolchak's primary mission was to support General Yudenich in his operations against the Ottoman Empire. He also was tasked with countering the U-boat threat and planning the invasion of the Bosphorus (which was never carried out). Kolchak's fleet was successful at sinking several Turkish colliers. Because there was no railroad linking the coal mines of eastern Turkey with Constantinople, the Russian fleet's attacks on these Turkish coal ships caused the Ottoman government much hardship. In 1916, in a combined Army-Navy assault, the Russian Black Sea fleet aided the Russian army's capture of the Ottoman city of Trebizond (modern Trabzon).

One notable disaster took place under Kolchak's watch: the dreadnought Imperatritsa Mariya exploded in port at Sevastopol on 7 October 1916. A careful investigation failed to determine whether the cause of the disaster was accident or sabotage.

=== Revolution ===
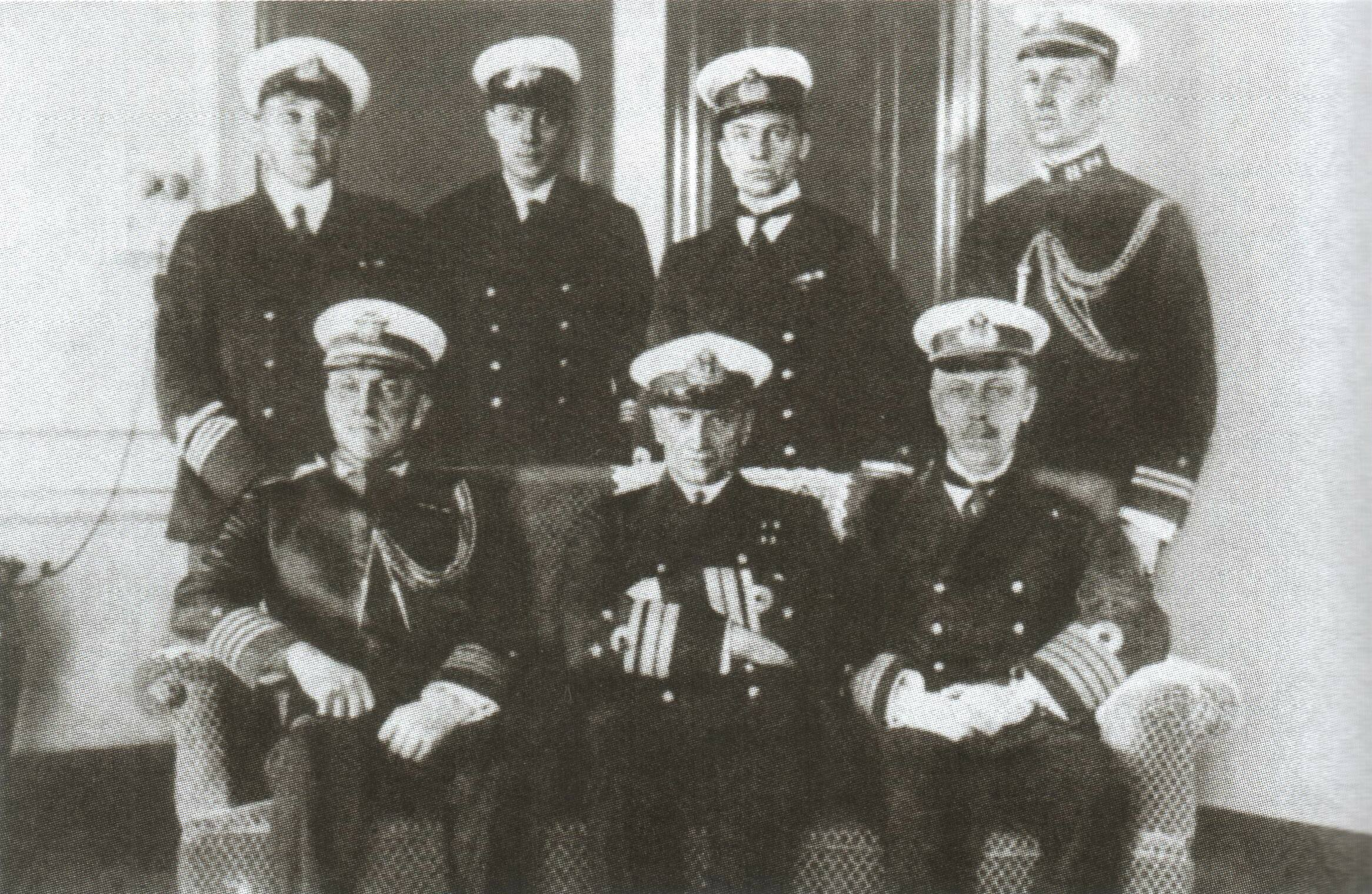
Kolchak (seated, center) in New York with U.S. and Russian officers. He was wearing the new Provisional Government naval uniform

The Black Sea fleet descended into political chaos after the onset of the 1917 February Revolution. Kolchak was relieved of command of the fleet in June and traveled to Petrograd. On his arrival at Petrograd, Kolchak was invited to a meeting of the Provisional Government. There he presented his view on the condition of the Russian armed forces and their complete demoralisation. He stated that the only way to save the country was to re-establish strict discipline and restore capital punishment in the army and navy.

During this time many organisations and newspapers of a conservative inclination spoke of him as a future dictator. A number of new and secret organisations had sprung up in Petrograd with the goal of suppressing the Bolshevik movement and removal of the extremist members of the government. Some of these organisations asked Kolchak to accept the offered leadership.

When news of these plots found their way to the then Naval Minister of the Provisional Government, Alexander Kerensky, he ordered Kolchak to leave immediately for America. Admiral James H. Glennon, a member of American mission headed by Senator Elihu Root, invited Kolchak to the United States to brief the American Navy on the strategic situation in the Bosphorus. On 19 August 1917 Kolchak left Petrograd, with several of his officers, for Britain and the United States as a quasi-official military observer. When passing through London he was greeted cordially by the First Sea Lord, Admiral Sir John Jellicoe, who offered him transport on board a British cruiser on his way to Halifax in Canada. The journey to America proved unnecessary, as by the time Kolchak arrived, the US had given up the idea of any independent action in the Dardanelles. Kolchak visited the American Fleet and its ports, and in San Francisco he decided to return to Russia via Japan.

=== Russian Civil War ===
Flag of the Provisional Siberian Government

The Bolshevik revolution in November 1917 found Kolchak in Japan. In December, he visited the British embassy in Tokyo and offered his services "unconditionally and in whatever capacity" to the British. Two years later, when interrogated by the Bolsheviks, he explained that as a supporter of the Provisional Government, he considered himself honour bound to continue to fight the war with Germany, and, understanding that there was no suitable role in the British Navy for a Russian admiral, he would be prepared to fight as a private in the British army. His offer was referred up to the Foreign Secretary, Arthur Balfour, and accepted on 29 December. He was instructed to join the British military mission in Baghdad, but when he reached Singapore, was ordered to turn back and go via Shanghai and Beijing to Harbin, to take command of Russian troops guarding the Russian-owned Chinese Eastern Railway in Manchuria, which the British government had decided could be a base for overthrowing the Bolshevik government and getting Russia back into the war with Germany. Arriving in Omsk, Siberia, en route to enlisting with the Volunteer Army, he agreed to become a minister in the (White) Siberian Regional Government. Joining a 14-man cabinet, he was a prestige figure; the government hoped to play on the respect he had with the Allies, especially the head of the British military mission, General Alfred Knox. Knox wrote that Kolchak had "more grit, pluck and honest patriotism than any Russian in Siberia".

According to historian Richard Pipes, Kolchak was a man with poor social skills, being moody, melancholic, taciturn, and very uncomfortable in dealing with people. Arriving at a dinner, Colonel John Ward described him as "a small, vagrant, lonely soul without a friend enter unbidden to a feast". One who knew him wrote:

The character and soul of the Admiral are so transparent that one needs no more than one week of contact to know all there is to know about him. He is a big, sick child, a pure idealist, a convinced slave of duty and service to an idea and to Russia. An indubitable neurotic who quickly flares up, exceedingly impetuous and uncontrolled in expressions of displeasure and anger; in this respect he has assimilated the highly unattractive traditions of the naval service, which permit in high naval ranks behavior that in our army has long since passed into the realm of legend. He is utterly absorbed by the idea of serving Russia, of saving her from Red oppression, and restoring her to full power and to the inviolability of her territory. For the sake of this he can be persuaded and moved to do anything whatever. He has no personal interests, no amour propre: in this respect he is crystal pure. He passionately despises all lawlessness and arbitrariness, but because he is so uncontrolled and impulsive, he himself often unintentionally transgresses against the law, and this mainly when seeking to uphold the same law, and always under the influence of some outsider. He does not know life in its severe, practical reality, and lives in a world of mirages and borrowed ideas. He has no plans, no system, no will: in this respect he is soft wax from which advisers and intimates can fashion whatever they want, exploiting the fact that it is enough to disguise something as necessary for the welfare of Russia and the good of the cause to be certain of his approval.

Another who knew him wrote of Kolchak:

He is kind and at the same time severe, responsive and at the same time embarrassed to show human feelings, concealing his gentleness behind make-believe severity. He is impatient and stubborn, loses his temper, threatens and then calms down, making concessions, spreads his hands in a gesture of helplessness. He is bursting to be with the people, with the troops, but when he faces them, has no idea of what to say.

Politically naive and an inept administrator, Kolchak described himself as a "military technician" who knew nothing of politics, described power as a "cross", and in a letter to his wife wrote about the "terrifying burden of Supreme Power" and admitted that as "a fighting man he was reluctant to face the problems of statecraft". The American historian Richard Pipes wrote that Kolchak's only strengths were his courage, patriotism, integrity, and a strong sense of honor, writing that he was "... in many ways, along with Wrangel, the most honorable White commander in the Civil War", but his weaknesses, such as his tendency to suffer from manic depression and inability to "understand people or communicate with them", made him into "an execrable administrator in whose name were committed unpardonable acts of corruption and brutality that he personally found utterly repugnant."

In November 1918, the unpopular regional government was overthrown in a British-sponsored coup d'etat. Kolchak had returned to Omsk on 16 November from an inspection tour. He was approached and refused to take power. The Socialist-Revolutionary (SR) directory leader and members were arrested on 18 November by a troop of Cossacks under ataman Krasilnikov. The remaining cabinet members met and voted for Kolchak to become the head of government with emergency powers. He was named Supreme Ruler (Verkhovnyi Pravitel), and he promoted himself to full admiral. The arrested SR politicians were expelled from Siberia and ended up in Europe.

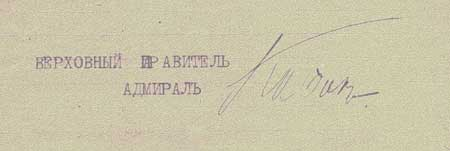
Kolchak's signature

The program of the Kolchak government included: ending Bolshevism and restoring law and order; re-establishing the Russian armed forces; convoking a new Constituent Assembly; introducing economic reforms; and maintaining the territorial integrity of Russia. Kolchak issued the following appeal to the population:

I shall not go either on the road of reaction or on the fatal road of Party partisanship. I set as my main objective the creation of an efficient army, victory over Bolshevism and the establishment of law and order, so that the people may choose the form of government which it desires without obstruction and realize the great ideas of liberty which are now proclaimed in the whole world. I summon you, citizens, to unity, to struggle with Bolshevism, to labor and to sacrifices

The Left SR leaders in Russia denounced Kolchak and called for his assassination. Their activities resulted in a small revolt in Omsk on 22 December 1918, which was quickly put down by Cossacks and the Czechoslovak Legion, who summarily executed almost 500 rebels. Subsequently, the SRs opened negotiations with the Bolsheviks and in January 1919 the SR People's Army joined up with the Red Army.

Kolchak pursued a policy of persecuting revolutionaries as well as Socialists of several factions. His government issued a decree on 3 December 1918 stating, "In order to preserve the system and rule of the Supreme Ruler, articles of the criminal code of Imperial Russia were revised, Articles 99 and 100 of which established capital punishment for assassination attempts on the Supreme Ruler and for attempting to overthrow his government." Insults written, printed, and oral, are punishable by imprisonment under Article 103. Bureaucratic sabotage under Article 329 was punishable by hard labour from 15 to 20 years.

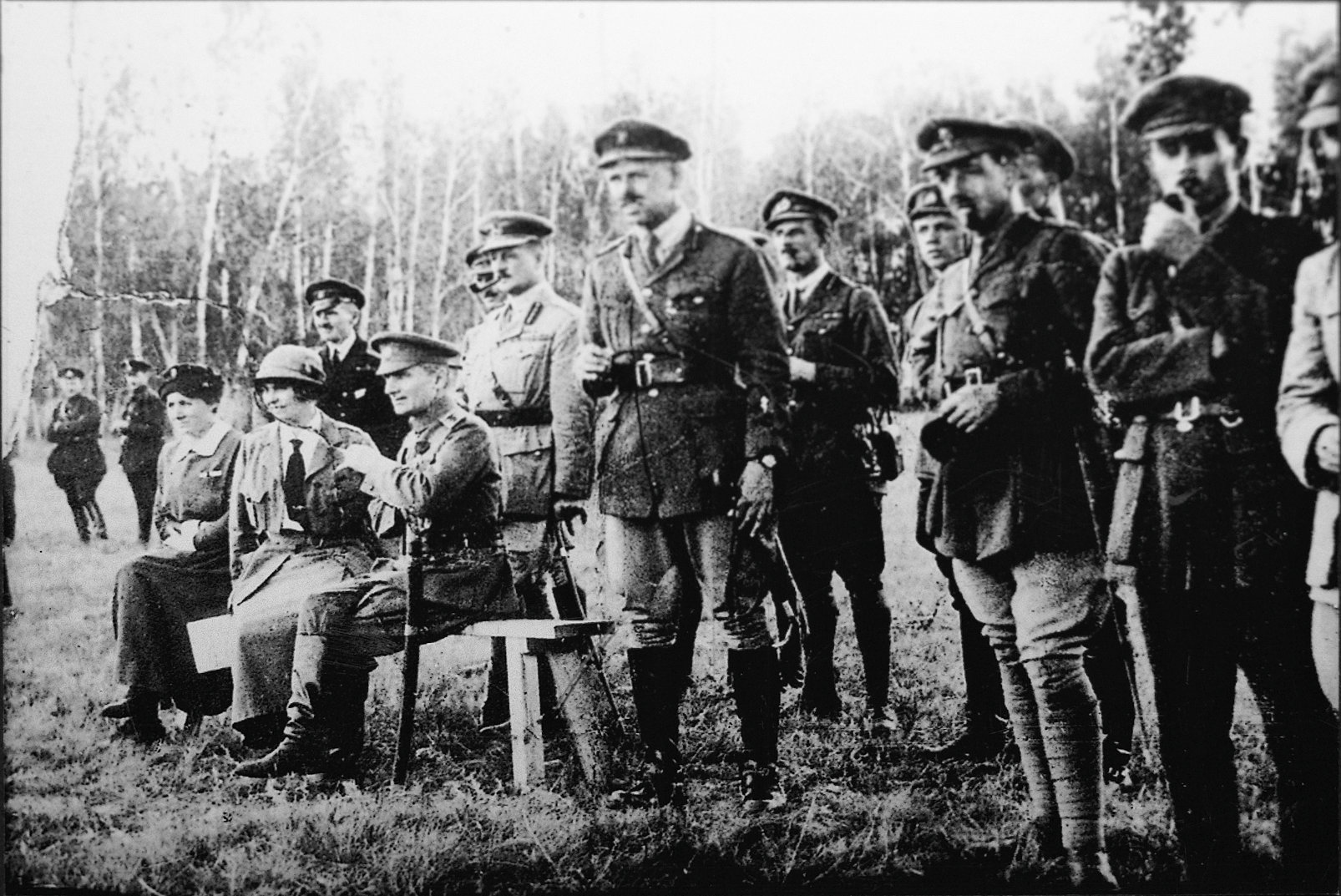
Kolchak (seated), Anna Timiryova and General Alfred Knox (behind Kolchak) observing a military exercise in 1919

Although the news of Kolchak's ascension to power spread very slowly behind Bolshevik lines, it caused considerable excitement among anti-communist Russians living there. Ivan Bunin wrote in his diary, "4/17 June 1919. The Entente has named Kolchak the Supreme Ruler of Russia. Izvestia wrote an obscene article saying: 'Tell us, you reptile, how much did they pay you for that?' The devil with them. I crossed myself with tears of joy."

On 11 April 1919, the Kolchak government adopted Regulation no. 428, "About dangers to public order due to ties with the Bolshevik Revolt". The legislation was published in the Omsk newspaper Omsk Gazette (no. 188 of 19 July 1919). It provided a term of 5 years imprisonment for "individuals considered a threat to the public order because of their ties in any way with the Bolshevik revolt." In the case of unauthorized return from exile, there could be hard labour from 4 to 8 years. Articles 99–101 allowed the death penalty, forced labour and imprisonment, repression by military courts, and imposed no investigation commissions.

Kolchak acknowledged all of Russia's debts, returned nationalized factories and plants to their owners, granted concessions to foreign investors, dispersed trade unions, persecuted Marxists, and disbanded the soviets. Kolchak's agrarian policy was directed toward restoring private land ownership. To this end former Tsarist laws concerning property were restored.

On 26 May 1919, the Supreme War Council in Paris offered to provide Kolchak with unlimited supplies of food, weapons, munitions and other supplies (but not diplomatic recognition) provided that he was willing to meet the following conditions:

- Promise to convene the Constituent Assembly the Bolsheviks had disbanded in January 1918.
- Allow local self-government in territories under his control.
- Promise not to restore the aristocracy, the "former land system" and "make no attempt to reintroduce the regime which the revolution had destroyed" (i.e. not restore the monarchy).
- Recognize independence of Finland and Poland.
- Accept Allied mediation for relations with the Baltic states and in the Caucasus.
- Promise to join the League of Nations.
- Promise to pay all of Russia's debts.

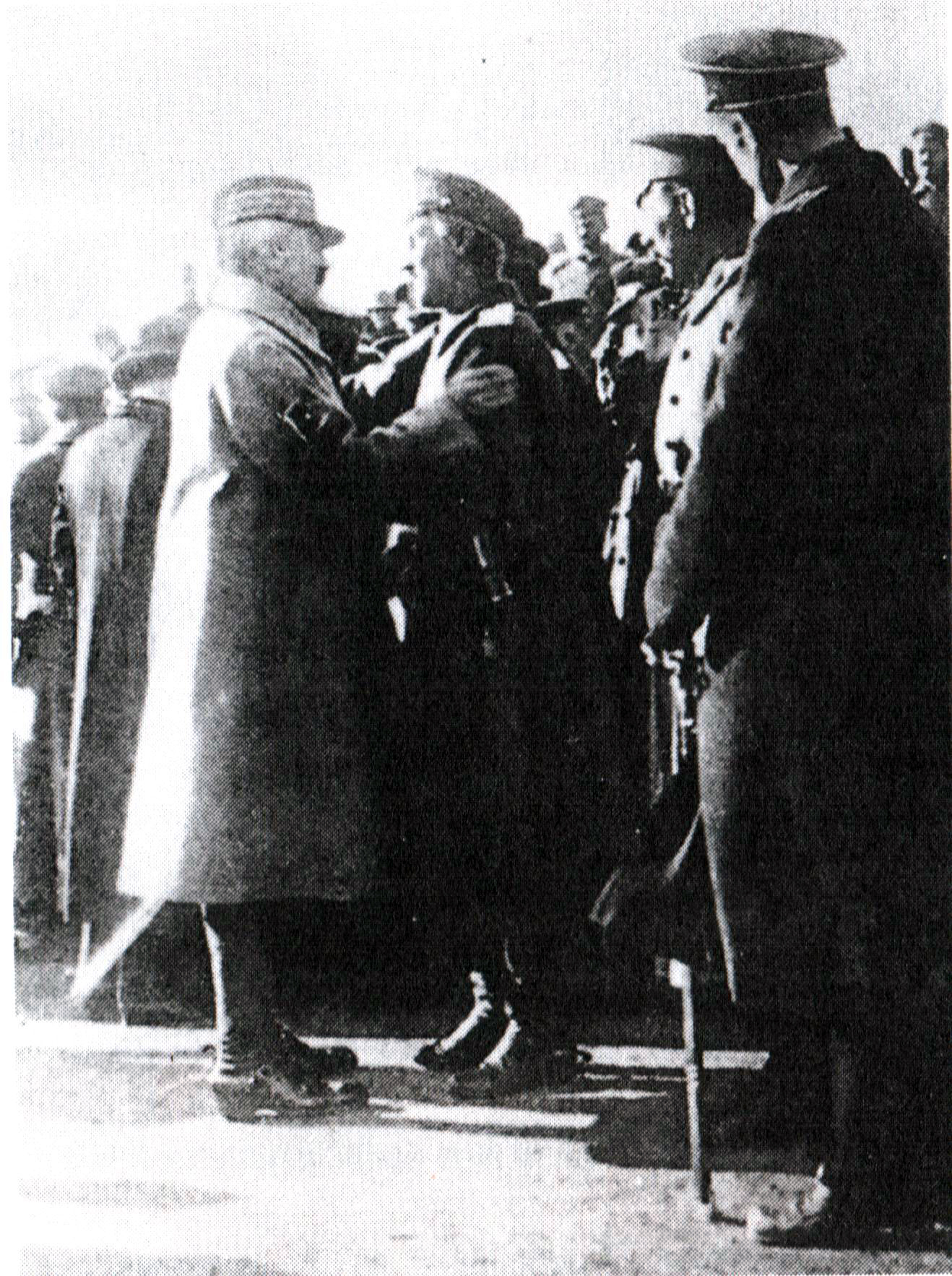
Kolchak with French general Maurice Janin

Pipes wrote that though the Allies wanted a Constituent Assembly to decide the future of Russia, they had decided in advance in their conditions that, for instance, there would be no restoration of the monarchy as well as many other matters that properly should have been decided by the Constituent Assembly. Because Kolchak was entirely dependent upon supplies from Britain—the British had shipped him in the period October 1918-October 1919 about 600,000 rifles, 6,831 machine guns, and about 200,000 uniforms—he had to accept nearly all of the conditions. In a telegram to Paris sent on 4 June 1919, Kolchak accepted every condition except for the independence of Finland, which he accepted only de facto, not de jure, saying he wanted the Constituent Assembly to grant Finland its independence. As the Allies were especially opposed to a return of the House of Romanov, Kolchak emphatically declared "that there cannot be a return to the regime which existed in Russia before February 1917." The British War Secretary Winston Churchill pressed very strongly in the cabinet for British recognition of Kolchak's government, but the Prime Minister David Lloyd George would only do so if the United States likewise recognized Kolchak. The American president Woodrow Wilson was strongly hostile towards Kolchak, openly doubted his word, and was against diplomatic recognition. Wilson's main adviser on Russia was the former head of the Provisional Government, Alexander Kerensky, who told Wilson that Kolchak was a "reactionary" who would "inaugurate a regime hardly less sanguinary and repressive than that of the Bolsheviks." Though American forces in Siberia co-operated with Kolchak, it was clear he was not the man favored by the United States as the next leader of Russia. American forces had been sent to Siberia less to help the Whites than to prevent the Japanese, who had occupied the Russian Far East, from annexing it as Tokyo was openly considering.

The Great Soviet Encyclopedia alleges that more than 25,000 people were shot or tortured to death in the Yekaterinburg Governorate alone. In March 1919 Kolchak himself demanded of one of his generals that he "follow the example of the Japanese who, in the Amur region, had exterminated the local population." Sovietskaya Rossiya, an official organ of the Soviet Bureau established by Ludwig Martens, quoted a Menshevik organ, Vsegda Vperyod, alleging that Kolchak's men used mass floggings and razed entire villages to the ground with artillery fire. 4,000 peasants allegedly became victims of field courts and punitive expeditions and that all dwellings of rebels were burned down. Kolchak also allowed Boris Annenkov to massacre 2,000 to 3,000 Jews.

In an excerpt from the order of the government of Yenisei county in Irkutsk province, General. S. Rozanov said:

Those villages whose population meets troops with arms, burn down the villages and shoot the adult males without exception. If hostages are taken in cases of resistance to government troops, shoot the hostages without mercy.

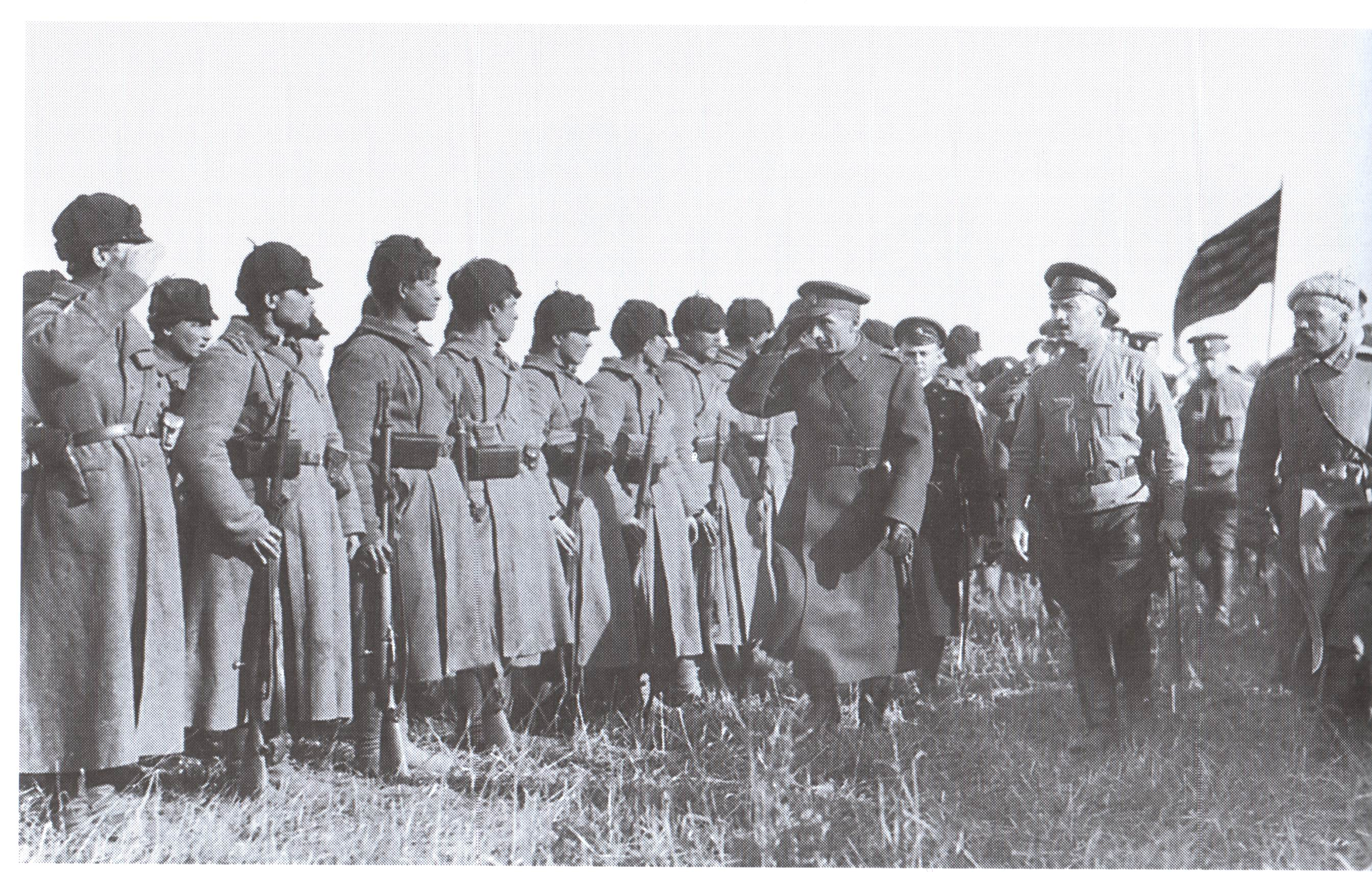
Kolchak inspecting troops

There was prominent underground resistance in the regions controlled by Kolchak's government. These partisans were especially strong in the provinces of Altai and Yeniseysk. In summer 1919 partisans of the Altai Region united to form the Western Siberian Peasants' Red Army (25,000 men). The Taseev Soviet Partisan Republic was founded south-east of Yeniseysk in early 1919. By the fall of 1919, Kolchak's rear was completely disintegrating. About 100,000 Siberian partisans seized vast regions from Kolchak's regime even before the approach of the Red Army. In February 1920, some 20,000 partisans took control of the Amur region.

British historian Edward Hallett Carr wrote,

It is no longer possible for any sane man to regard the campaigns of Kolchak, Yudenich, Denikin and Wrangel otherwise than as tragic blunders of colossal dimensions.

On the contrary, a former chief of staff to Admiral Kolchak wrote,

They (Kolchak, Kornilov, Denikin and Wrangel) were first of all patriots with a deep love for their country and worked for its salvation without any regard for self-advancement. Political intrigues were unknown to them and they were ready to work with men of any political party, so long as they knew that these men were sincere in their endeavours to free Russia... and to make it possible, after the end of the war, for a National Assembly, chosen by the people, to decide the character of the future Government of Russia.

==== White Terror ====
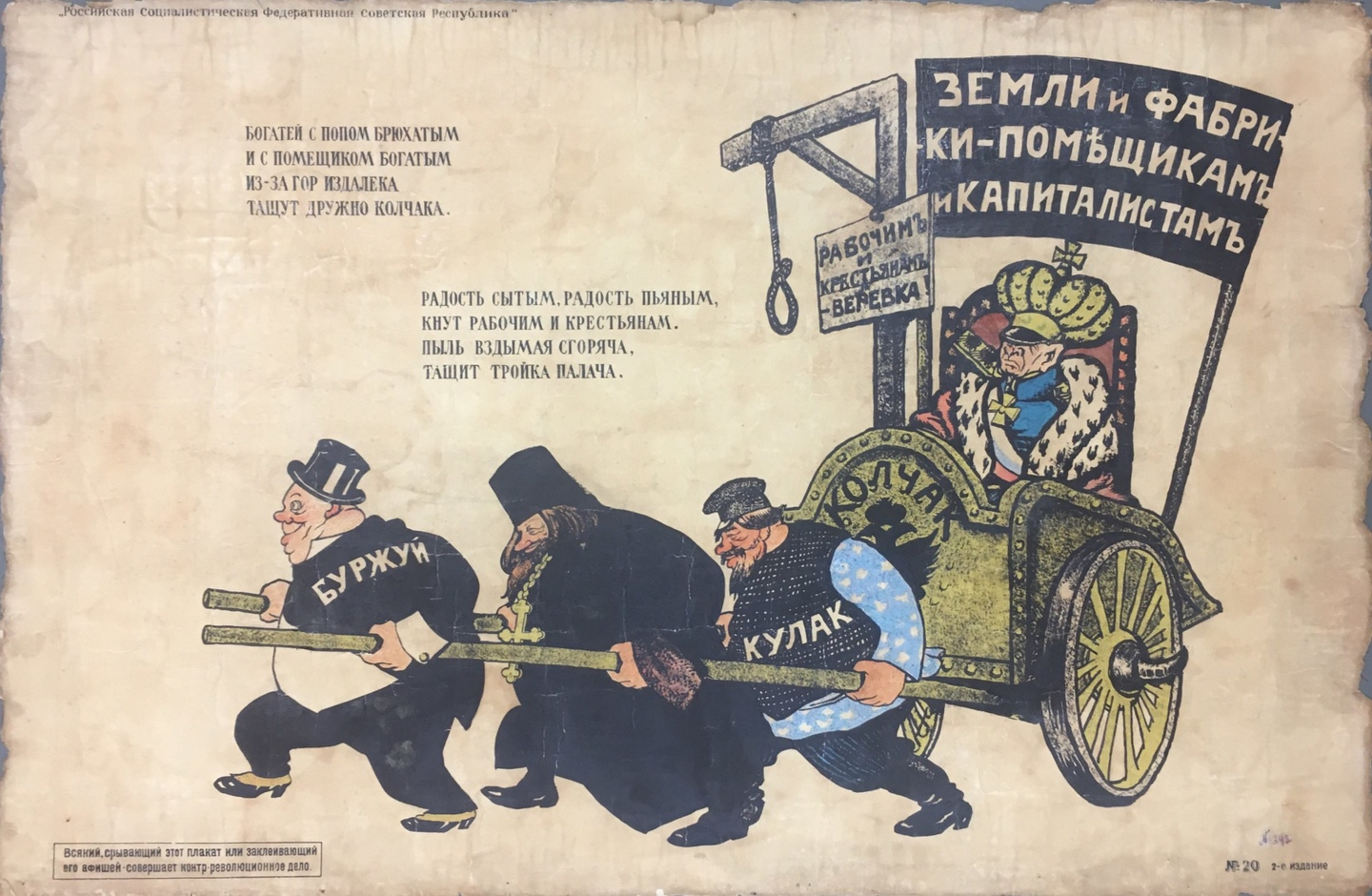
Caricature of Kolchak. (In the crown)

Kolchak's government issued a broadly worded decree on December 3, 1918, revising articles of the criminal code of Imperial Russia "in order to preserve the system and rule of the Supreme Ruler". Articles 99 and 100 established capital punishment for assassination attempts on the Supreme Ruler and for attempting to overthrow the authorities. Under Article 103, "insults written, printed, and oral, are punishable by imprisonment". Bureaucratic sabotage under Article 329 was punishable by hard labor for 15 to 20 years.

Additional decrees followed, adding more power. On April 11, 1919, the Kolchak government adopted Regulation 428, "About the dangers of public order due to ties with the Bolshevik Revolt", which was published in the Omsk newspaper Omsk Gazette (no. 188 of July 1919). It provided a term of five years of prison for "individuals considered a threat to the public order because of their ties in any way with the Bolshevik revolt". In the case of an unauthorized return from exile, there could be hard labor for four to eight years. Articles 99–101 allowed the death penalty, forced labor and imprisonment, and repression by military courts, and they also imposed no investigation commissions.

An excerpt from the order of the government of Yenisei county in the Irkutsk Governorate, General. Sergey Rozanov said:

Those villages whose population meets troops with arms, burn down the villages and shoot the adult males without exception. If hostages are taken in cases of resistance to government troops, shoot the hostages without mercy.

A member of the Central Committee of the right-wing Socialist Revolutionaries, D. Rakov wrote about the terror of Kolchak's forces:

Omsk just froze in horror. At a time when the wives of dead comrades, day and night looked in the snow for bodies, I was unaware of the horror behind the walls of the guardhouse. At least 2500 people were killed. Entire carts of bodies were carried to a city, like winter lamb and pork carcasses. Those who suffered were mainly soldiers of the garrison and the workers.

Even the Czech-Slovaks, who had spearheaded the anti-Bolshevik uprising in Siberia, became appalled by Kolchak's regime in Omsk. On November 15, 1919, they delivered a memorandum to the Allied representatives in Vladivostok:

The military authorities of the Government of Omsk are permitting criminal actions that will stagger the entire world. The burning of villages, the murder of masses of peaceful inhabitants, and the shooting of hundreds of persons of democratic convictions and also those only suspected of political disloyalty occurs daily.

Two days later, Czech General Radola Gajda led a revolt in Vladivostok against Kolchak's authority.

=== Supreme Ruler of Russia ===
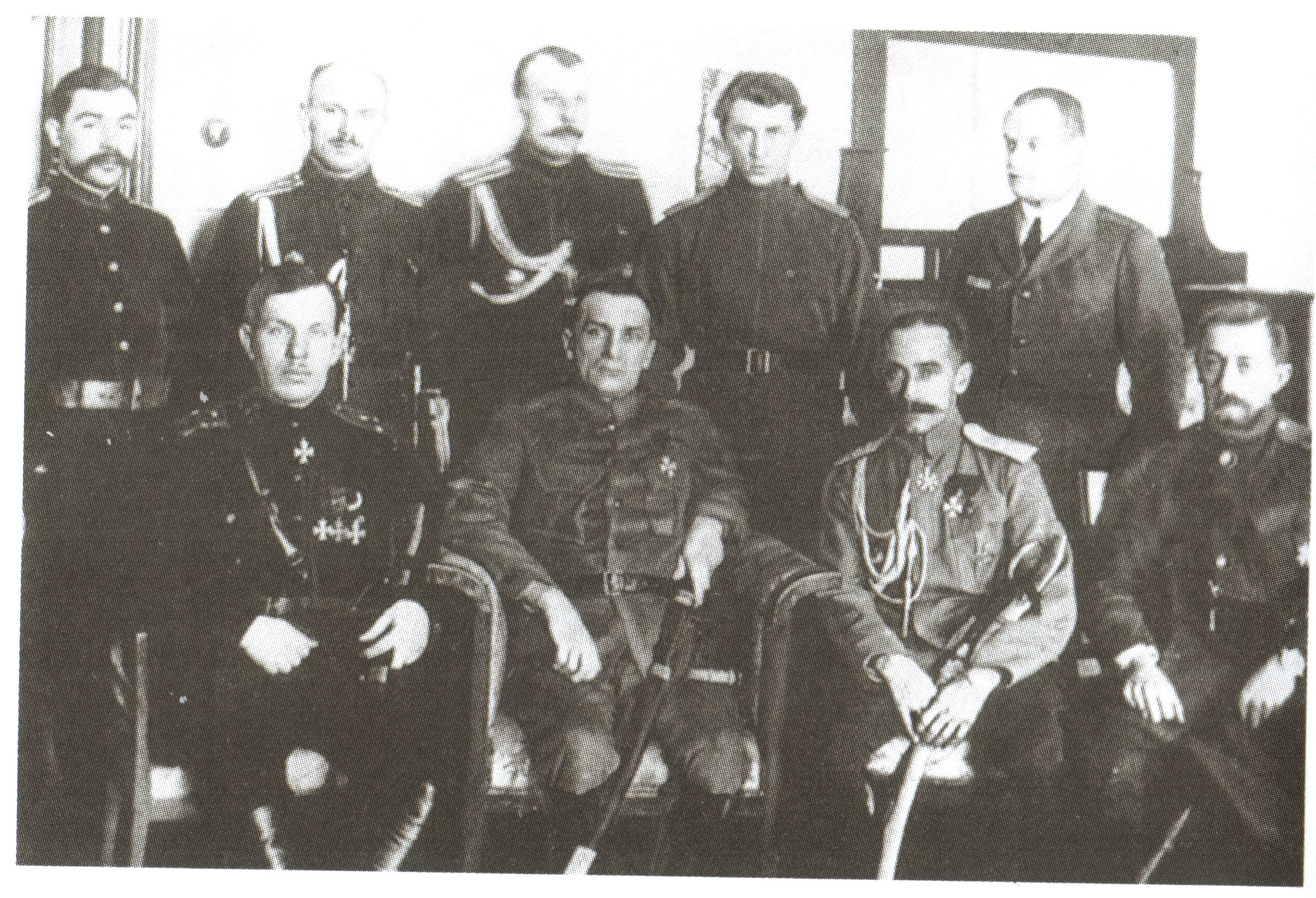
Kolchak with Radola Gajda in 1919

Initially the White forces under his command had some success. Kolchak was unfamiliar with combat on land and gave the majority of the strategic planning to D. A. Lebedev, Paul J. Bubnar, and his staff. The northern army under the Russian Anatoly Pepelyayev and the Czech Rudolf Gajda seized Perm in late December 1918 and after a pause other forces spread out from this strategic base. The plan was for three main advances – Gajda to take Archangel, Khanzhin to capture Ufa and the Cossacks under Alexander Dutov to capture Samara and Saratov.

The White forces took Ufa in March 1919 and pushed on from there to take Kazan and approach Samara on the Volga River. Anti-Communist risings in Simbirsk, Kazan, Viatka, and Samara assisted their endeavours. The newly formed Red Army proved unwilling to fight and retreated instead, allowing the Whites to advance to a line stretching from Glazov through Orenburg to Uralsk. Kolchak's territories covered over 300,000 km^{2} and held around 7 million people. In April, the alarmed Bolshevik Central Executive Committee made defeating Kolchak its top priority. But as the spring thaw arrived Kolchak's position degenerated – his armies had outrun their supply lines, they were exhausted, and the Red Army poured newly raised troops into the area.

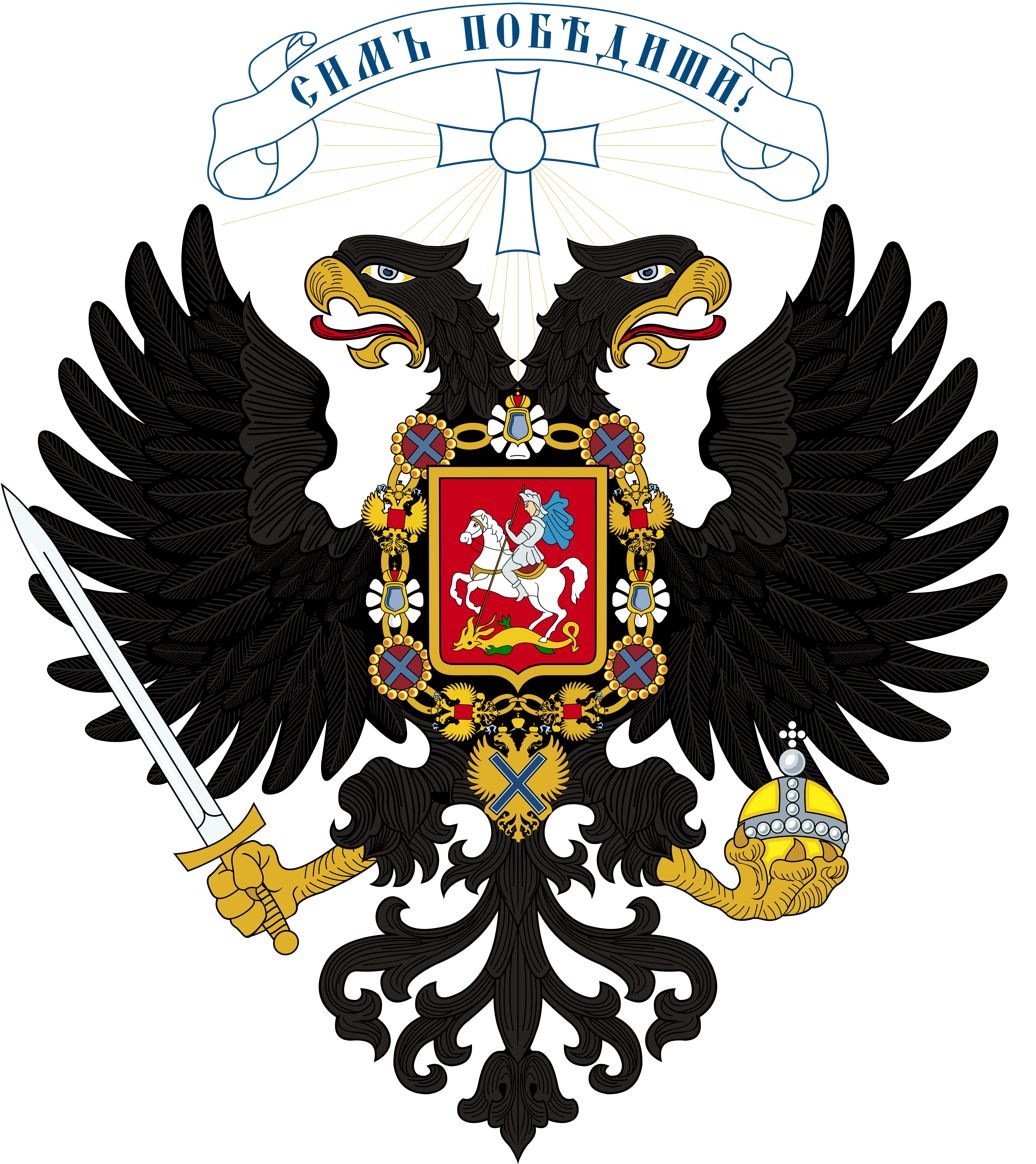
Draft coat of arms of the Russian government

Kolchak had also aroused dislike of potential allies, including the Czechoslovak Legion and the Polish 5th Rifle Division. They withdrew from the conflict in October 1918 but remained a presence; their foreign adviser General Maurice Janin regarded Kolchak as an instrument of the British and himself was pro-SR. Kolchak could not count on Japanese aid either; the Japanese feared he would interfere with their occupation of Far Eastern Russia and refused him assistance, creating a buffer state to the east of Lake Baikal under Cossack control. The 7,000 or so American troops in Siberia were strictly neutral regarding "internal Russian affairs" and served only to maintain the operation of the Trans-Siberian railroad in the Far East. The American commander, General William S. Graves, personally disliked the Kolchak government, which he saw as monarchist and autocratic, a view that was shared by the American President, Wilson.

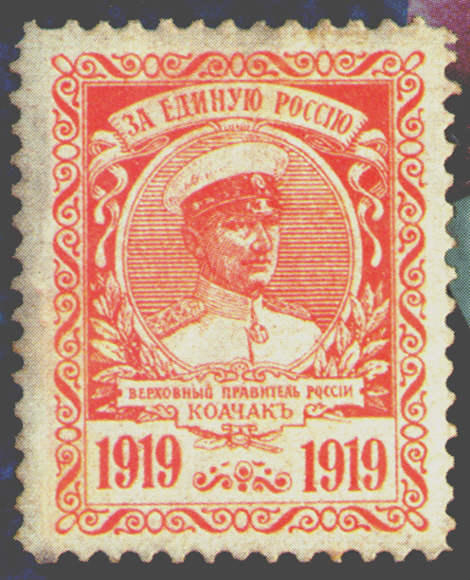
Postage stamp issued in 1919 with the inscription "For United Russia – Supreme leader of Russia, Kolchak."

=== Defeat and death ===
From 1919, when the Bolshevik forces managed to reorganise and turn the attack against Kolchak, he quickly lost ground. The Red counter-attack began in late April at the centre of the White line, aiming for Ufa. The fighting was fierce as, unlike earlier, both sides fought hard. Ufa was taken by the Red Army on 9 June and later that month the Red forces under Mikhail Tukhachevsky broke through the Urals. Freed from the geographical constraints of the mountains, the Reds made rapid progress, capturing Chelyabinsk on 25 July and forcing the White forces to the north and south to fall back to avoid being isolated. The White forces re-established a line along the Tobol and the Ishim rivers to temporarily halt the Reds. They held that line until October, but the constant loss of men killed or wounded was beyond the White rate of replacement. Reinforced, the Reds broke through on the Tobol in mid-October and by November the White forces were falling back towards Omsk in a disorganised mass. At this point the Reds became sufficiently confident to start redeploying some of their forces southwards to face Denikin.

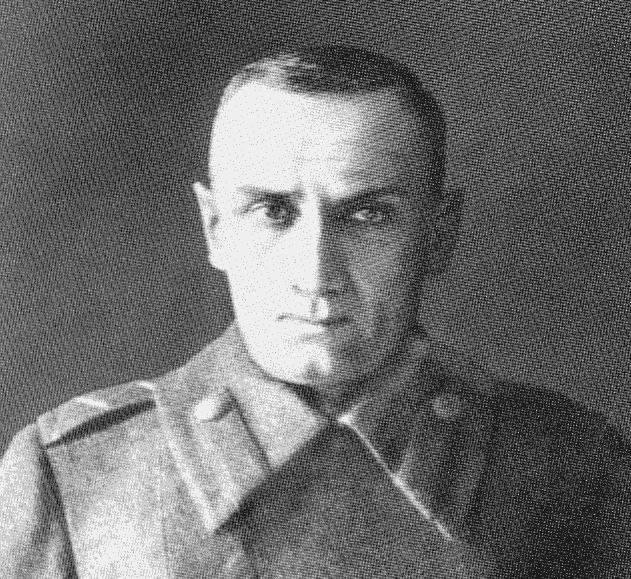
The last photo of Kolchak taken before his execution in 1920

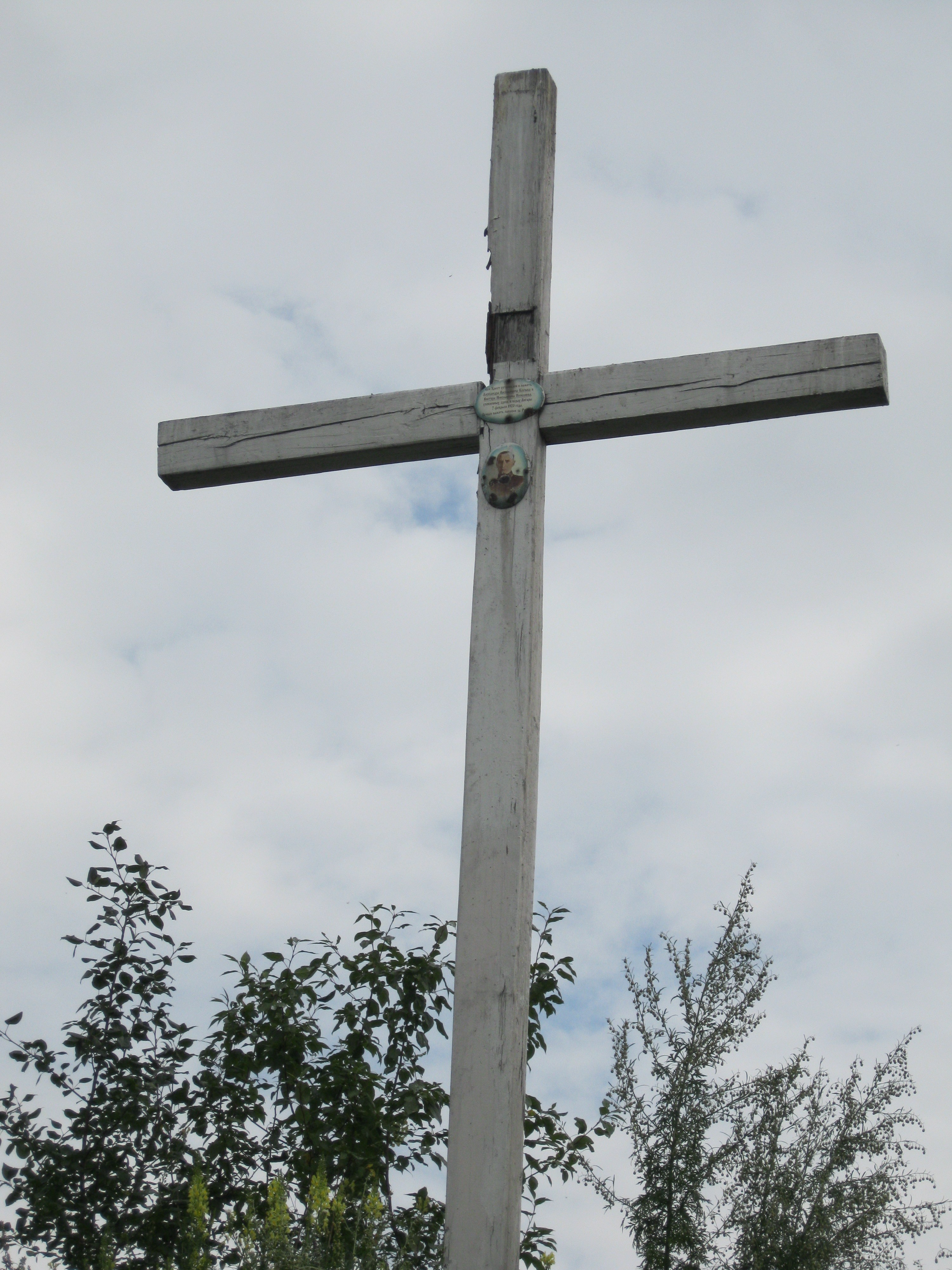
A memorial cross placed at the resting place of Kolchak

Kolchak also came under threat from other quarters: local opponents began to agitate and international support began to wane, with even the British turning more towards Denikin. Gajda, dismissed from command of the northern army, staged an abortive coup in mid-November. Omsk was evacuated on 14 November, and the Red Army took the city without any serious resistance, capturing large amounts of ammunition, almost 50,000 soldiers, and ten generals. As there was a continued flood of refugees eastwards, typhus too became a serious problem.

Kolchak had left Omsk on 13 November for Irkutsk along the Trans-Siberian Railroad. Notoriously, he had managed to take the former Imperial gold supplies with him in his train. This gold accounted for a weight of approximately 1,600 tons and a value of billions of dollars. The ultimate fate of these gold reserves has never been clearly determined, leaving much room to legends and speculation (a popular notion being that the gold ended up in Lake Baikal).

Travelling a section of track controlled by the Czechoslovaks, Kolchak was sidetracked and stopped; by December his train had only reached Nizhneudinsk. In late December Irkutsk fell under control of a leftist group (including SRs and Mensheviks) and formed the Political Centre. One of their first actions was to dismiss Kolchak. When he heard of this on 4 January 1920, he announced his resignation, giving his office to Denikin and passing control of his remaining forces around Irkutsk to an ataman, G. M. Semyonov. The transfer of power to Semyonov proved a particularly ill-considered move.

Kolchak was then promised safe passage by the Czechoslovaks to the British military mission in Irkutsk. Instead, he was handed over to the Left SR authorities in Irkutsk on 14 January. On 20 January the government in Irkutsk surrendered power to a Bolshevik military committee. The White Army under the command of General Vladimir Kappel advanced toward Irkutsk while Kolchak was interrogated by a commission of five men representing the Revolutionary Committee (REVKOM) during nine days between 21 January and 6 February. Despite the arrival of a contrary order from Moscow, Kolchak was sentenced to death along with his Prime Minister, Viktor Pepelyayev.

Both prisoners were brought before a firing squad in the late night of 6 February. According to eyewitnesses, Kolchak was entirely calm and unafraid, "like an Englishman". The Admiral asked the commander of the firing squad, "Would you be so good as to get a message sent to my wife in Paris to say that I bless my son?" The commander responded, "I'll see what can be done, if I don't forget about it." A priest of the Russian Orthodox Church then gave the last rites to both men. The squad fired and both men fell. The bodies were kicked and prodded down an escarpment and dumped under the ice of the frozen Angara River; they have not been recovered yet. When the White Army learned about the executions, its remaining leadership decided to withdraw farther east. The Great Siberian Ice March followed. The Red Army did not enter Irkutsk until 7 March, and only then was the news of Kolchak's death officially released.

== Awards and decorations ==
- Russian Empire:
  - Cross of St. George, 3rd class (15 April 1919)
  - Cross of St. George, 4th class (2 November 1915)
  - Order of Saint Anna, 1st class with swords (1 January 1917)
  - Order of Saint Anna, 2nd class (6 December 1910)
  - Order of Saint Anna, 4th class with the inscription "For Bravery" (15 November 1904)
  - Order of Saint Stanislaus, 1st class with swords (4 July 1916)
  - Order of Saint Stanislaus, 2nd class with swords (12 December 1905)
  - Order of Saint Vladimir, 2nd class with swords (12 December 1905)
  - Order of Saint Vladimir, 3rd class with swords (9 February 1915)
  - Order of Saint Vladimir, 4th class with swords and bow (19 March 1907)
  - Saint George Gold Sword for Bravery, with inscription "For the defense in cases against the enemy near Port Arthur" (12 December 1905)
  - Russo-Japanese War Medal (1906)
  - Medal "In commemoration of the reign of Emperor Alexander III" (1896)
  - Medal "In Commemoration of the 300th Anniversary of the Reign of the House of Romanov" (1913)
  - Medal "In Commemoration of the 200th Anniversary of the Naval Battle of Gangut" (1915)
  - Great Gold Constantine Medal by Imperial Russian Geographical Society (30 January 1906)
  - Port Arthur Cross (1914)
- French Third Republic:
  - Officer of the Legion of Honour (1914)
- British Empire:
  - Knight Grand Cross of the Order of the Bath (1915)

== Legacy ==
Kolchak's government was not successful from the time of his taking the position of "Supreme Ruler" until his death.

Kolchak was unable to win diplomatic recognition from any nation in the world, even the United Kingdom (though the British did support him to some degree). In addition he alienated the Czechoslovak Legion, which for a time was a powerful organised military force in the region and very strongly anti-Bolshevik. As was mentioned above, the American commander, Graves, disliked Kolchak and refused to lend him any military aid at all.

The For Faith and Fatherland movement has attempted to rehabilitate Kolchak's reputation. However, two rehabilitation requests have been denied, by a regional military court in 1999 and by the Supreme Court of the Russian Federation in 2001. In 2004, the Constitutional Court of Russia returned the Kolchak case to the military court for another hearing.

Monuments dedicated to Kolchak were built in Saint Petersburg in 2002 and in Irkutsk in 2004, despite objections from some former communist and left-wing politicians, as well as former Soviet army veterans. His memorial in St. Petersburg is a frequent target of vandalism. There is also a Kolchak Island. The modern Russian Navy considered naming the third ship of the new Admiral Grigorovich-class frigates, Admiral Kolchak to commemorate the Admiral but declined to do so in the end.

Kolchak was a prominent expert on naval mines and member of the Russian Geographical Society. He was also known in the field of Arctic research, having published 16 articles on the subject. His awards are the Saint George Gold Sword for Bravery, given for his actions in the battle of Port Arthur and the Great Gold Constantine Medal from the Russian Geographic Society.

== In culture ==
A Kolchak biographical film, titled Admiral (Адмиралъ), was released in Russia on 9 October 2008 after a gala preview to an audience of senior Russian Navy admirals. The film portrays the Kolchak (played by Konstantin Khabensky) as a tragic hero with a deep love for his country. Elizaveta Boyarskaya appears as his common law wife, the poet Anna Timireva. Director Andrei Kravchuk described the film as follows:

It's about a man who tries to create history, to take an active part in history, as he gets caught in the turmoil. However, he keeps on struggling, he preserves his honor and his dignity, and he continues to love.

In the shared alternate history of Ill Bethisad (1997 and after), the Kolchak-led White Army winning the Russian Civil War is a major point of divergence from actual history in the timeline of the fictional alternate universe.

== See also ==
- Iliaș Colceag, an ancestor
- Russian Civil War
- White Terror (Russia)

== Sources ==
- Beevor, Antony (2022). Russia: Revolution and Civil War, 1917–1921. Penguin. ISBN 978-0-593-49388-5.
- Admiral Kolchak. M. I. Smirnov. The Slavonic and East European Review, Vol. 11, No. 32 (Jan. 1933), pp. 373–387
- Problems of Polar Research: a Series of Papers by Thirty-one Authors. Special Publication No.7. New York, American Geographical Society, 1928.
- The testimony of Kolchak and other Siberian materials. Varneck, Elena, Harold H. Fisher, Aleksandr Vasiliyevich Kolchak, Konstantīn Andreevīch Papov, and Anton Zakharovich Ovchinnikov. Stanford University Press. 1935.
- Fleming, Peter. The Fate of Admiral Kolchak. Rupert Hart-Davis. 1963.
- Pipes, Richard (1993). Russia Under the Bolshevik Regime. New York: Alfred Knopf.
- Skarbo, Svetlana and Valeria Sukhova. (2020) “Admiral Kolchak’s Archive has returned to Russia 100 Years after his Execution Archived 16 January 2022 at the Wayback Machine.” Siberian Times (12 February).
- Smele, Jonathan Civil War in Siberia: The Anti-Bolshevik Government of Admiral Kolchak, Jonathan D. Cambridge University press, 1996.
- White Siberia, N.G.O. Pereira. McGill-Queens University Press, 1996.
- Boyakova, Sardana (2005). Mark Nuttal (ed.). Encyclopedia of the Arctic. Routledge. ISBN 1-57958-4365.
