= Bashkir Government =

Government of Bashkiria between 1917 and 1919

- Bashkir: Башҡорт хөкүмәте
- The State Flag of Bashkurdistan

Agency overview
- Formed: 20 December 1917
- Dissolved: 20 March 1919
- Superseding agency: Bashkir Military Revolutionary Committee
- Jurisdiction: Bashkurdistan
- Headquarters: Orenburg, Caravanserai
- Agency executive: Yunus Bikbov, Chairman of the Government
- Parent department: Small Kurultay

The Bashkir Government (Government of Bashkiria, Government of Bashkurdistan) was the supreme executive authority of Bashkiria.

== History ==
The Bashkir Government was elected on 20 December 1917 by the Small Kurultai at the Third All-Bashkir Constituent Congress. Yunus Bikbov was elected chairman.

The local institutions of the Bashkir Government were the canton (district) and yurt (volost) boards, the formation of which began in the autumn of 1917. In relation to the Soviet power, the Bashkir Government initially took a waiting position. On the basis of the decision of the Orenburg Muslim Military Revolutionary Committee, on the night of February 15–16, 1918, 7 members of the Bashkir Government and the Bashkir Central Shuro (Ildarkhan Mutin, Allabirda Yagafarov, Sagit Mryasov, Akhmet-Zaki Validov, Galiakhmet Aitbaev, Abdulla Adigamov, Ildsa Adigamov, Isa Salikhov) were arrested. The resolution of the Muslim Military Revolutionary Committee on the arrest was approved by the Orenburg Provincial Revolutionary Committee only retroactively, which believed the libel of the workers of the Muslim Military Revolutionary Committee on the alleged joint actions of the Bashkir Government against the Soviet government with the ataman of the Orenburg Cossack Circle Alexander Dutov. After the arrest of members of the Bashkir Government, a group of Bashkir youth, including some activists from the Tulkin youth organization, formed a new governing body – the Provisional Revolutionary Council (Shuro) of Bashkurdistan. In March 1918, in Baimak, the Bolsheviks shot two members of the Government of Bashkurdistan – Gabdulla Idelbaev and Gimran Magazov. On April 4, members of the government under arrest were released during a joint raid by the Bashkirs and Cossacks.

The conditions for the restoration of government activity arose after the speech of the Czechoslovak Corps, when Soviet power was liquidated in a significant territory of the region. The location of national institutions in June–July 1918 was occupied by the Czechs Chelyabinsk, where members of the government and Small Kurultay arrived.

According to the farman of the Government of Bashkurdistan of June 12, 1918, the Bashkir Military Council was formed to control the Bashkir army.

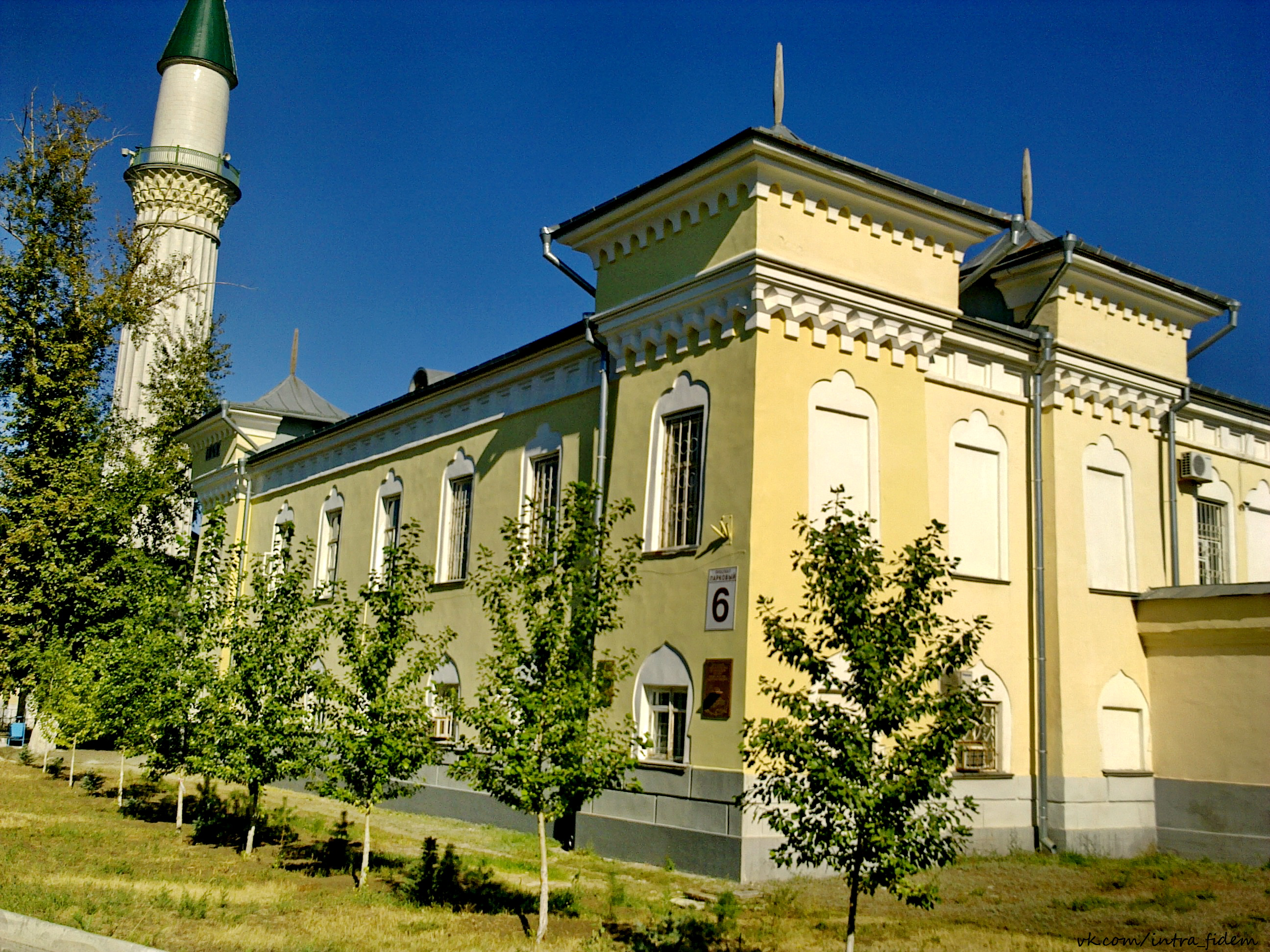
The residence of the Government and Parliament of Bashkurdistan was located in the Orenburg Caravanserai

The Bashkir Government established contacts with anti-Bolshevik centers in the east of the country – the Provisional Siberian Government, Committee of Members of the All-Russian Constituent Assembly, the Orenburg Cossack Circle, and others.

The government officially published the Bulletin of the Bashkir Government. Representatives of the Bashkirs participated in the Chelyabinsk district congress and the formation of a number of county structures, in particular the land administration, which included the representative of the Bashkirs, Hadji-Akhmet Ishbulatov.

In early August, the government of the institution moved to Orenburg, occupied by detachments of the Orenburg Cossack Army, whose leaders were quite loyal to the prospect of autonomy and state independence of Bashkortostan. A government delegation led by Iskandar Sultanov, Yunus Bikbov, Akhmet-Zaki Validov participated in a state meeting in Ufa, where in October 1918 an attempt was made to unite various political forces under the flag of the Directory.

On 18 November 1918, Alexander Kolchak made a military coup and declared himself the Supreme Ruler of Russia and the Supreme Commander-in-Chief of the Armed Forces of Russia. Admiral Kolchak did not recognize the autonomy of the Bashkirs. All local governments were invited to declare self-liquidation, but the Government of Bashkurdistan refused to obey the "Certificate of the Provisional All-Russian Government to All Regional Governments, to All Citizens of the Russian State" of November 4, 1918. This appeal, as well as the abolition of the Bashkir Military Council and the headquarters of the Bashkir Corps along with the transfer of command of the Bashkir regiments to Lieutenant General Alexander Dutov, forced the Bashkir Government to negotiate with representatives of the Russian Socialist Federative Soviet Republic. After the start of negotiations with the Soviet authorities on the transfer of the Bashkir army towards the Red Army, the reorganization of the Bashkir Government took place in the village of Temyasovo on January 26, 1919. Mstislav Kulaev was elected its new chairman, and Akhmet-Zaki Validov became the commander of the Bashkir Army. This government sought to establish autonomy already in the Soviet system.

The Bashkir Government sent a delegation to Moscow from the chairman of the Bashkir Government Mstislav Kulayev, a member of the Bashkir Government Mullayan Halikov and the commander of the Bashkir Army Abdrashit Bikbavov to negotiate the formation of the Bashkir Soviet Autonomous Republic.

On February 16, 1919, the government announced the entry of the autonomous Bashkir Republic into the Russian Socialist Federative Soviet Republic on February 18 and the Bashkir Army was transferred to the side of the Red Army. On February 22, 1919, the Bashkir Government transferred power on the territory of Bashkuristan to the Provisional Military Revolutionary Committee of the Bashkir Republic, on the basis of which the Bashkir Military Revolutionary Committee was later formed.

On 20 March 1919, the "Agreement of the Central Soviet Government with the Bashkir Government on the Soviet Autonomous Bashkiria" was signed in Moscow and the Autonomous Soviet Bashkir Republic was formed. By signing this document, the Soviets recognized the national-territorial autonomy of Bashkurdistan, which has existed since 1917. After that, the Government of Bashkurdistan completed its activities.

Among the national figures who remained on the side of the White Guards and declared support for Alexander Kolchak, Gabdulla Kurbangaliev and his son Muhammed-Gabdulkhay Kurbangaliev came first. On 26 July 1919, the convocation of the All-Bashkir Congress was scheduled in Chelyabinsk (it was supposed to form alternative to Validov and his supporters of the national institution). The defeat of the Kolchakites during the Chelyabinsk battle and the withdrawal of the White Guards from the territory of the Urals actually put an end to attempts to recreate the Bashkir Government.

== Chairmen ==
- Yunus Bikbov (December 1917 – January 1919);
- Mstislav Kulaev (January 1919 – March 1919).

== Printing organs ==
The press organs of the Government of Bashkurdistan were the newspapers Bashkort Tauysh and Bashkortostan Hokumetenen Tele.

Samples of title pages of documents and seals of the Bashkir Government
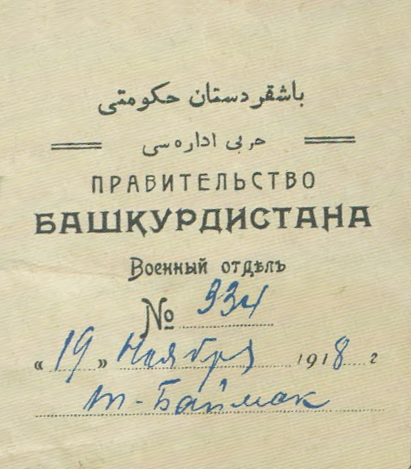

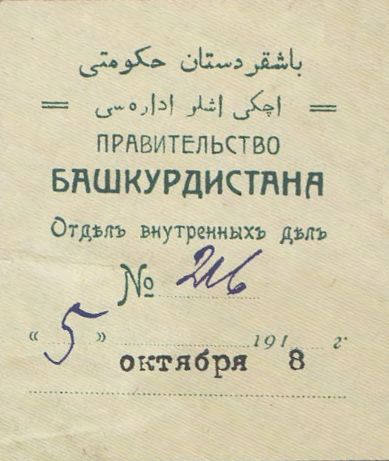

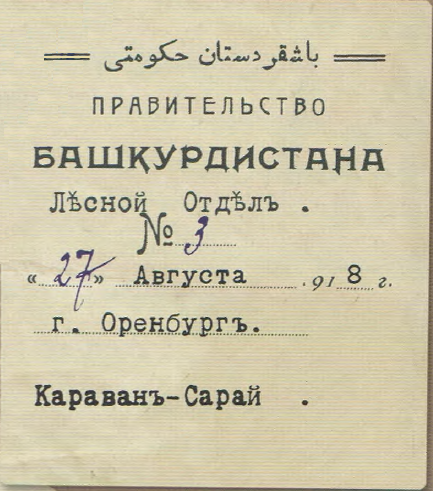

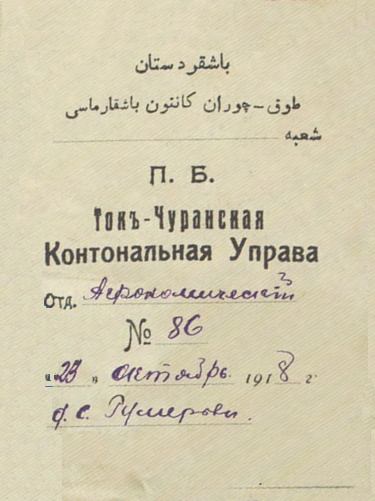

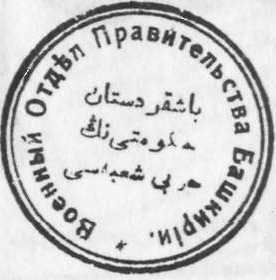

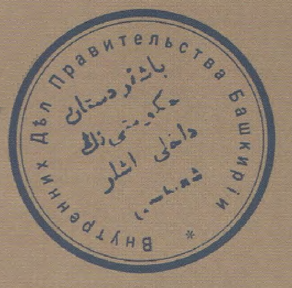

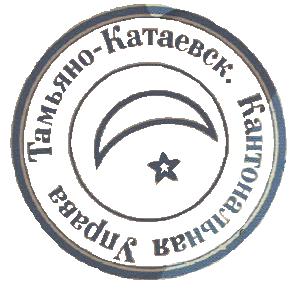

== Sources ==
- Salavat Kasimov. Bashkir Government // Bashkir Encyclopedia / Editor-in-Chief Marat Ilgamov – Ufa: State Autonomous Institution of Science "Bashkir Encyclopedia", 2015–2019 – ISBN 978-5-88185-306-8
- To the 90th Anniversary of the Proclamation of Soviet Autonomy of Bashkortostan
