= Pleshanovo =

Pleshanovo (Russian: Плешаново) is the name of several rural localities in Russia:

- Pleshanovo, Orenburg Oblast, a selo in Pleshanovsky Selsoviet of Krasnogvardeysky District of Orenburg Oblast
- Pleshanovo, Palkinsky District, Pskov Oblast, a village in Palkinsky District, Pskov Oblast
- Pleshanovo, Pytalovsky District, Pskov Oblast, a village in Pytalovsky District, Pskov Oblast
- Pleshanovo, Vologda Oblast, a village in Nelazsky Selsoviet of Cherepovetsky District of Vologda Oblast
