= Sagit Mryasov =

Bashkir leader

- Сәғит Мерәҫов (Bashkir); Сагит Мрясов (Russian)

Chairman of the Bashkir Government
- In office 10 May – 20 July 1917

Acting Chairman of the Provisional Revolutionary Council (Shuro)
- In office 17 June – 30 June 1918

Personal details
- Born: 1880 Mryasovo, Kipchak volost, Orenburgsky Uyezd, Orenburg Governorate, Russian Empire
- Died: 1932 (aged 51–52) Sterlitamak, Bashkir ASSR, Russian SFSR, Soviet Union
- Profession: Political leader; public figure; writer

Sagit Gubaidullovich Mryasov (Russian: Сагит Губайдуллович Мрясов, Bashkir: Сәғит Ғөбәйҙулла улы Мерәҫов, romanized: Säğit Ğöbäyźulla ulı Meräśov; 1880–1932) was a Bashkir political leader, public figure, writer, and historian.

== Early life and education ==
Mryasov was born in 1880 in Mryasovo, Orenburgsky Uyezd, Orenburg Governorate, Russian Empire (now Novosergiyevsky District, Orenburg Oblast, Russia).

He attended a madrasa in his native village Mryasovo, becoming an imam.

== Career ==
From 1914 to 1917, Mryasov was a member of the board of the Union of Cooperatives of Orenburg. From May 1917, he was a member to the Bashkir Oblast Bureau.

In December 1917, he became a member of the Autonomous Bashkir Government, where he was responsible for the spiritual affairs of the autonomy, and member of the Kese Kurultai (Little Kurultai) and the Grand Mufti of Bashkurdistan. In the same year, he also was a delegate at the First All-Russian Muslim Congress. He was also among the organizers of the All-Bashkir Kurultais.

During the 1918 Assembly of the Bashkir Spiritual Administration, Mryasov was the Acting Chair. From 1918 to 1920, he led the republic's statistics.

In 1918, he additionally became an editor to the newspapers "Muhbir" and "Bashkorto".

In July 1918, Mryasov founded and headed the Irkutsk department of the Bashkir Military Council and the 4th Bashkir Infantry Regiment. On 3 October 1918, he raised the issue of appointing imams in the Bashkir Army.

From February 1919, he worked in the agitation and educational department of the Military-Revolutionary Committee of Bashkortostan.

During the Great Terror, he was repressed, and labelled a nationalist bourgeois.

Outside politics, Mryasov was a writer, historian, translator, and folklorist. At some point, he became the first ever to translate the 7 poems of Salawat Yulayev to Bashkir. In the 1920s, he did science and taught Bashkir history, literature, language, and folklore. He was also among the co-creators of the modern Bashkir alphabet.

Mryasov died in 1932 in Sterlitamak.
