= Yunus Bikbov =

Bashkir statesman (1883–1942)

Yunus Yulbarisovich Bikbov

Chairman of Kese–Kurultay Chairman of the Bashkir Government People's Commissar of Justice of the Bashkir Republic
- In office December 1917 – January 1919
- Preceded by: Office established
- Succeeded by: Mstislav Kulaev

Personal details
- Born: 1883 Abulyais, 2nd Usergan Volost, Orsk Uezd, Orenburg Governorate
- Died: 1942 (aged 58–59) Karaganda, Kazakh Soviet Socialist Republic
- Party: Social Democrat (since 1909); Socialist Revolutionary (later)
- Education: Kazan University

Yunus Yulbarisovich Bikbov (1883 – 1942) was one of the leaders of the Bashkir National Movement, party leader and statesman, Chairman of the Bashkir Government. Repeatedly repressed as a "Bashkir Nationalist".

== Biography ==
Born in 1883 in the village of Abulyais, 2nd Usergan Volost, Orsk Uezd, Orenburg Governorate.

He received his primary education in a medrese in the village of Yunys, then studied at a Russian school. After school he entered the Orenburg Gymnasium, where he became a member of the local Social Democratic circle, and later a member of the Socialist Revolutionary Party.

In 1909 he became a student at the Faculty of Law of Kazan University. Subject to supervision since 1909 due to party activities.

In 1917, he began working as a justice of the peace in the 2nd Usergan Volost and in the summer of that year he actively became involved in the Bashkir National Movement for the autonomy of Bashkurdistan.

In December 1917, at the Founding III All–Bashkir Kurultay, he was elected Chairman of the Pre–Parliament – Kese–Kurultay and a member of the Bashkir Government.

At the end of 1917, he was elected as a delegate to the Constituent Assembly from the Bashkir Federalists in the Orenburg Electoral District (List No. 9).

In 1918 he became Chairman of the Bashkir Government.

In 1919, after the formation of the Bashkir Revolutionary Committee, he was included in its composition at the First All–Bashkir Military Congress.

After signing the Agreement with the central Soviet authorities, he was elected People's Commissar of Justice of the Autonomous Bashkir Soviet Republic.

After the May 1920 decree of the All–Russian Central Executive Committee and the Council of People's Commissars of the Russian Socialist Federative Soviet Republic on limiting the rights of the Autonomous Bashkir Soviet Republic and violations of the articles of the Agreements, members of the Bashkir Government submitted their collective resignation. He returned to his previous job as a justice of the peace in the 2nd Userganskaya Volost.

On May 18, 1930, by decision of the troika of the United State Political Administration of the Bashkir Autonomous Socialist Soviet Republic, he was sentenced to 5 years of confinement and sent to the construction of the White Sea–Baltic Canal. After returning, he left to live in Tashkent, where he first worked as a teacher at school, then at a university. In 1938, he was again sentenced on false charges, but to 8 years in prison, and was sent to Kazakhstan, where he died in 1942. Rehabilitated in 1962.
