= Bashkiria (1917–1919) =

Short-lived state in Bashkortostan during the Russian Civil War

Bashkiria Башкирия (Russian) Башҡурдистан (Bashkir)
- 1917–1919
- Flag

- Bashkiria in 1919
- Status: Autonomy of the Russian Republic (1917–1918); Autonomy of the Russian SFSR (1918); Autonomy of the Russian State under military occupation (1918–1919)
- Capital: Orenburg (until June 1918); Chelyabinsk (after June 1918)
- Official languages: Bashkir, Russian

Government
  - Prime Minister: Yunus Bikbov (1917–1918); Sagit Murasov (1918–1919)
- Legislature: Kese Qoroltay

Establishment
- History
  - Declaration of autonomy: 28 November 1917
  - Orenburg occupied by the Red Army: 27 January 1918
  - Occupation by the Czechoslovak Legion: Late May 1918
  - Agreement between the Soviet and Bashkir governments on autonomy: 20 March 1919
  - Established: 1917
  - Disestablished: 1919

Area
  - Total: 79,560 km^{2} (30,720 sq mi)

Population
  - 1917 estimate: 1,250,059
Preceded by	Succeeded by
Russian Republic	Bashkir Autonomous Soviet Socialist Republic
- Today part of: Russia; Bashkortostan; Chelyabinsk Oblast; Orenburg Oblast; Perm Krai; Samara Oblast

Bashkiria, (Note: Russian: Башкирия, romanized: Baškirija, IPA: [bɐʂˈkʲirʲɪjə]) also called Bashkurdistan, (Note: Bashkir: Башҡурдистан, romanized: Başqurdistan, IPA: [bɑʂˌqurdisˈtɑn]) Lesser Bashkiria, or the Autonomy of Bashkortostan, (Note: Башҡортостан автономияһы, Başqortostan avtonomiyahı) was a short-lived autonomous state which existed from 1917 to 1919, during the Russian Civil War. Aligned with the Russian State, Bashkiria was attacked and later annexed by the Russian Soviet Federative Socialist Republic, leading to its 1919 collapse and succession by the Bashkir Autonomous Soviet Socialist Republic.

== History ==
Following the February Revolution, nationalist sentiment began to foment within Bashkiria, leading to the creation of the Bashkir Regional Bureau in June 1917. The Bashkir Regional Bureau organised local councils, called shuros, to ensure the expansion of Bashkir rights. Subsequently, in July and August 1917, the first and second All-Bashkir Qoroltays were held in Orenburg and Ufa, respectively, where a consensus was reached to create a "democratic republic on a national-territorial basis as part of federal Russia."

Elected by the first and re-elected by the second All-Bashkir Qoroltay, the Bashkir Central Shuro was established to organise a Bashkir delegation to the Russian Constituent Assembly. However, following the October Revolution, the process of establishing autonomy was significantly changed. On 11 November 1917, the Central Shuro confirmed the need for an autonomous Bashkiria.

Four days later, Bashkir autonomy was declared by the Central Shuro. The declaration of autonomy was signed by Central Shuro chairman Sharif Manatov, deputy chairman Zeki Velidi Togan, and secretary Shaikhzada Babich, as well as the heads of the Central Shuro's six departments. The resolution stated, "The Bashkir Regional Council declares the Bashkir territory of the Orenburg, Ufa, Samara and Perm governorates from this 15 November an autonomous part of the Russian Republic." Local government, including railways, troops, and post offices, were taken over by the government of Bashkiria.

According to the resolution of the All-Bashkir Qoroltay on 20 December 1917, an independent army, named simply the Bashkir Army, was established under the leadership of Zeki Velidi Togan. An independent judiciary was also established in Bashkiria in accordance with the resolutions of the Qoroltay, with laws based on those of the Russian Republic. In cases evolving only Bashkirs, laws by the Central Shuro and Kese Qoroltay, the legislature of Bashkiria, were to be used. The prospect of land reform was also considered, with the All-Bashkir Qoroltay declaring that all citizens of the region had a right to own land. The Main Department of Agriculture and Property was created as a state fund to manage land interests.

In the village of Yelpachikha, a local Bashkir council was formed, only for its members to be killed by Bolshevik forces shortly after its establishment. Relations continued to decline between the Bashkirs and Bolsheviks, despite a statement by Vladimir Lenin describing the Bashkir movement as "not counter-revolutionary" and "quite natural and very necessary." Following the capture of Orenburg by the Red Army, the Central Shuro at first chose to work with the Bolsheviks, declaring neutrality in the Russian Civil War, and adopted its own constitution, the Regulations of Autonomous Lesser Bashkiria, which declared, among other things, the status of the Bashkir language as the sole official language. On 26 February 1918, the Bashkir government declared to work alongside the Bolsheviks.

Tensions, however, remained high. Following the arrests of several government members by the Bolsheviks, a group of Bashkir youth from the Tulqyn formed their own government body, the Provisional Revolutionary Council of Bashkiria, submitted a resolution "On the Autonomy of Bashkiria", and submitted it to the People's Commissariat for Nationalities for approval. At first, it was approved, and the publishing of Bashkir-language texts began. However, only shortly after its establishment, the PRCB was abolished by Orenburg Oblast Executive Committee following condemnations of national autonomy, with the PRCB being explicitly compared to the Central Shuro.

By March 1918, the situation had reached a breaking point. Independent Bashkir regiments had begun clashing with the Red Army, and two members of the government (Gabdulla Idebayev and Gimran Magazov) were executed by the Bolsheviks. The Red Guards actively conducted attacks on Bashkirs and seized weapons. On 3–4 April 1918, Bashkir military commander Amir Qaramyshev, with assistance from Orenburg Cossacks, besieged the prison where the Bashkir government was held, leading to their release. Four days later, in Soviet-controlled Ufa, a secret meeting of Bashkir leaders was held at which it was determined to fight the Bolsheviks.

By late May 1918, the autonomy of Bashkiria had been completely restored with the assistance of the Czechoslovak Legion. On 1 June 1918, a letter, titled "Appeal of the Bashkir government to the people", was published, calling for armed resistance to the Red Army. Sagit Murasov was elected as interim chairman of the Central Shuro. Links were established with the government of the Russian State, Provisional Siberian Government, Committee of Members of the Constituent Assembly (Komuch), and the Orenburg Cossacks. Among their most prominent supporters was Alexander Dutov, ataman of the Orenburg Cossacks.

From 15 to 17 May 1918, a meeting of representatives from Bashkiria and the Alash Autonomy was held in the city of Kostanay, where discussions of forming a joint movement against the Bolsheviks were held. In a subsequent meeting in Samara, which also included Central Asian governments, it was decided to establish a Federation of Southeastern Muslim Regions, as part of a "Union of Eastern Russia" including Central Asia, the Alash Autonomy, Bashkiria, Siberia, Komuch, and the Orenburg and Ural Cossacks. It was additionally planned to unite the militaries of the Alash Autonomy and Bashkiria in a single army. However, these agreements were never implemented.

From 8 to 23 September 1918, a State Meeting in Ufa was held, where members of the Bashkir movement met with other anti-Bolshevik forces as part of the Russian State. However, subsequent moves by Alexander Kolchak, including the forcible dissolution of the Bashkir Army and the transfer of its units to the Orenburg Cossacks, obliged the government of Bashkiria to engage in negotiates with Bolshevik forces. A 16 February 1919 resolution by the Central Shuro affirmed the willingness of the government to work with the Bolsheviks, furthermore declaring war on the Russian State, the Orenburg Cossacks, and "all world imperialists." Additional negotiations followed, leading to the agreement between the Soviet and Bashkir governments on autonomy on 20 March 1919. Bashkiria became the Bashkir Autonomous Soviet Socialist Republic, with recognition granted to the 1917–1919 government of Bashkiria as a historical entity.

== Government ==
=== Legislature ===
The legislature of Bashkiria was the Kese Qoroltay (lit. 'Lesser Kurultai'). Qualifications for membership were that candidates were at least 22 years old, and the ability for both men and women, as well as non-Bashkirs to hold office, was clearly laid out. The term of office for members of the Kese Qoroltay was three years. The first session of the Kese Qoroltay was chosen by the All-Bashkir Qoroltays, and consisted of 22 members (one member per 100,000 people).

=== Executive ===
The executive branch of the government was represented by the government of Bashkiria and the Bashkir Central Shuro. Both the government of Bashkiria and the Kese Qoroltay were originally headquartered in the Orenburg Caravanserai. As fighting intensified in Bashkiria, however, Bashkir forces were forced to withdraw to Chelyabinsk, held by the Czechoslovak Legion.

== Administrative-territorial division ==
The administrative-territorial division of Bashkurdistan was determined at the II All-Bashkir Constituent Kurultai (Congress), which was held in Orenburg on December 8-20, 1917, considered the borders of autonomous Bashkurdistan and approved autonomy. the representative kurultai decided to approve autonomy within the borders of Little Bashkiria, and 9 cantons were created on its territory instead of counties — Burzyan-Tangaurovsky, Jitirovsky, Baryn-Tabynsky, Ichkin-Kataysky, Kipchak, Kuvakan, Tamyan-Kataysky, Tok-Churansky, Usergansky, which were divided into 75 volosts[57][58].

During the occupation by the Whites, Little Bashkiria was formally considered an autonomy and consisted of 13 cantons. In fact, the territory was governed not only by the Bashkir, but also by the Siberian government, the Commander and ataman Dutov, with the help of the former system of county administrations, consisting of Russian officials
