= Sagit Agish =

- Born: Sagit Ishmuhametovich Agishev; 7 January 1905; Isyangildino village, Orenburgsky Uyezd, Orenburg Governorate, Russian Empire (now Alexandrovsky District, Orenburg Oblast, Russia)
- Died: 21 May 1973 (aged 68); Ufa, Bashkir ASSR, Soviet Union (now Bashkortostan, Russia)
- Citizenship: Russian Empire, USSR
- Education: Orenburg Bashkir Pedagogical College
- Occupations: poet, novelist, playwright, librettist
- Writing career
- Notable works: "Our laughter". In the years 1933-1940, he wrote a series of novels and short stories: "With regard to the conditions" ("Шартына килһен"), "The house of the muezzin" ("Мөдзин йортонда"), "Horsemen" ("Егеттәр"), "Mahmutov." During World War II, they were created patriotic works "Ilmurza Rider" ("Атлы Илмырҙа"), "Ahmadullah" In 1950 saw the release of the novel Agish "foundation" of the Bashkir village life. In 1964 came the story "Compatriots" on youth Musa Cälil.
- Notable awards: Order of the Red Banner of Labour Order of the Badge of Honour Salawat Yulayev Award

Sagit Agish (Bashkir: Сәғит Агиш, Russian: Саги́т Аги́ш, real name Bashkir: Сәғит Ишмөхәммәт улы Агишев, romanized: Säğit İşmöxämmät ulı Agişev, Russian: Саги́т Ишмухаме́тович Аги́шев; 7 January 1905 – 21 May 1973) was a Bashkir poet, writer and playwright.

== Early life ==
Sagit Agish was born as Sagit Ishmukhametovich Agishev on 19 January 1905 in the village of Isangildy, Orenburgsky Uyezd, Orenburg Governorate (now Alexandrovsky District, Orenburg Oblast). He attended Khusaniya School. He later studied at the Orenburg Bashkir Pedagogical College and the Bashkir State Pedagogical Institute.

== Literary career ==
Agish began writing in the 1930s. He started by writing prose. His earliest stories, “Makhmutov” (1939), “Guys” (1939), and “In Mazin’s House” (1940) portrayed life in the Soviet Union in the 1930s.

== Books ==
Agish wrote frequently about the Soviet Union. His books Ilmurza, A Horseman (1942), Akhmadulla (1944), To the Front (1944) and My Three Months (1944) are about tales of patriotism in the Soviet Union. He wrote one novel, Foundation (1951), on Bashkir village life. His other notable books include Selected Stories (1953), Two Dawns (1961), By the River (1961), On the Way (1967) and Gnedko (1972).
