= Provisional Siberian Government =

Provisional Siberian Government (Russian: Вре́менное Сиби́рское прави́тельство, or Russian: ВСП) may refer to:

- Provisional Siberian Government (Vladivostok), later named Provisional Government of Autonomous Siberia
- Provisional Siberian Government (Omsk)
