= Zainab Biisheva =

Bashkir writer (1908–1996)

- Born: Zainab Abdullovna Biisheva; 15 January 1908; Tuembetovo village, Orenburg uezd (county), Orenburg Governorate, Russian Empire (now Kugarchinsky District, Bashkortostan, Russia)
- Died: 24 August 1996 (aged 88); Ufa, Bashkortostan, Russia
- Citizenship: Russian Empire, USSR, Russia
- Education: Orenburg Bashkir Pedagogical College
- Occupations: poet, novelist, playwright, librettist
- Writing career
- Notable works: Trilogy "Toward the Light" ("Story of One Life") "Kanhylyu" (1949), "A Strange Man" (1960), "Where are you, Gulnisa?" (1962), "Duma Duma" (1963), "Love and Hate" (1964).
- Notable awards: Order of the Badge of Honour Salawat Yulayev Award

Zainab Biisheva (Bashkir: Зәйнәб Биишева, real name Zainab Abdullovna Biisheva, 15 January 1908, village of Tuembetovo (now - Kugarchinsky district of Bashkortostan – 24 August 1996, Ufa), was a Bashkir poet, writer and playwright.

== Biography ==
Zainab Biisheva was born on January 15, 1908, in the village of Tuembetovo (now - Kugarchinsky district of Bashkortostan in the family of teacher Abdulla Biishev. Since childhood, she was brought up on the best traditions of rich oral creativity.

Zainab Biisheva early became an orphan. Her mother died, when she was three years old, in 1919, his father died. She received her first knowledge in the village of Ibraevo, then entered the Bashkir Pedagogical College in the city of Orenburg.

Many future leaders of Bashkir culture, science, and statesmen studied at the Pedagogical College. There was a good literature circle in the college. It is here that Zainab writes his first poems and short stories. After graduating from the pedagogical college, in 1929-1931 she was a teacher in the village of Temyasovo, Baymak District. Here she married Gaziz Aminev. They had four children, but one died in childhood. In 1941, a war broke out with Germany and Aminev went to the front; he returned from the front, but became disabled.

After completing her studies, in 1929-1931 she was a teacher in the village of Temyasovo, Baymak District. After graduating from the Ufa continuing education courses (1931), he became editor of the Bashkir book publishing house and the Pioneer magazine (in 1930, Zainab Bisheva's first story "Among Waterfalls" was published).

The first book, Partisan Boy (The Guerilla Boy), was published in 1942. Member of the Union of Writers of the USSR since 1946. Since 1951 - a professional writer.

She died in Ufa on August 24, 1996.

== Creation ==
The first book "The Guerilla Boy" was published in 1942.

Member of the Writers' Union since 1946. Since 1951 - a professional writer.

In 1990 he was awarded the title of "People's Writer of Bashkortostan ".

Published more than 60 of her books in the languages of the peoples of Russia and the world.

Zainab Biisheva writing in different genres. She penned several works for children and youth, including the play "Friendship" and the novel " Let's be friends ", dozens of poems and tales. It acts as a fine lyric verse in the story " Gulyamal ." Poem " Last monologue Salawat " (1984) is devoted to disclosing the image of the national hero Salawat Yulayev. Dramatic works "Magic Kurai " (1957), " The Mysterious ring " (1959), " Gulbadar " (1961), " The Vow " (1966), " Zulhiza " (1981) with great success came not only on the stage of the Bashkir State Academic Theatre drama, but the theaters and far abroad.

Zainab Biisheva worked fruitfully in the genres of narrative, story and tale. The most famous are " Kanhylyu " (1949), "A Strange Man" (1960), " Where are you, Gulnisa?" (1962), "Duma Duma" (1963), "Love and Hate" (1964).

In them, she raises philosophical problems relationship between the individual and society, creates vivid images of women bashkirok. Most significant work of Zainab Abdullovna - trilogy " The light ", which includes the novels "humiliation" (1956–1959), " The Big Eyek " (1965–1967), " Yemesh " (1967!1969). Bashkir language translated it "Taras Bulba" by N. Gogol, "Bezhin Meadow" by Ivan Turgenev, " Timur and His Team " A Gaidar, "My dear boy ," L. Kassilya, stories Tolstoy, S.Aksakova, A. Chekhov, Gorky .

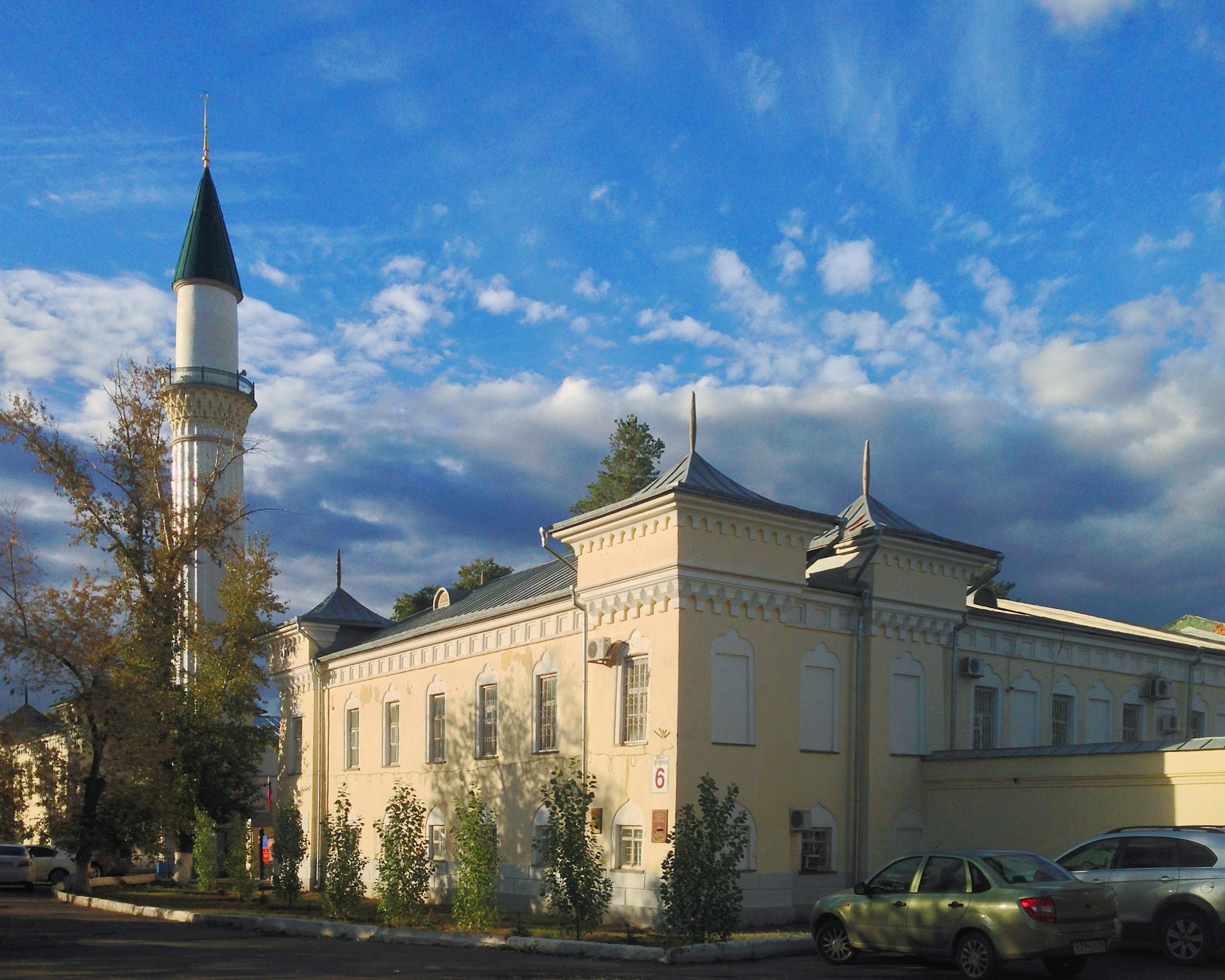
Orenburg Caravanserai. Bashkir Teachers College (1921–1936)

== Trilogy " Toward the Light " (" Story of One Life ") ==
Zainab Biisheva trilogy (1956–1969) - the result of many years of creative work and deep thoughts " about the time of life." In the novels, included in it, the author has proved a "master of the epic scope of reality " (A. Zhuravlev). In the center of the works - the fate of the Bashkir people in tense, turning points in history. Their action covers the years before World War I, the Civil War, the collectivization.

The main heroine of the trilogy uniting storylines is Gulyemesh (Yemesh), whose name translates from the Bashkir means " wild rose " (" berry "). In this manner undoubtedly concluded autobiographical features, but at the same time managed to show Z. Biisheva it typical features Bashkir women, their courage, fortitude, strength of spirit, poetry. Also a great place in the novels assigned image world of childhood, the formation of character.

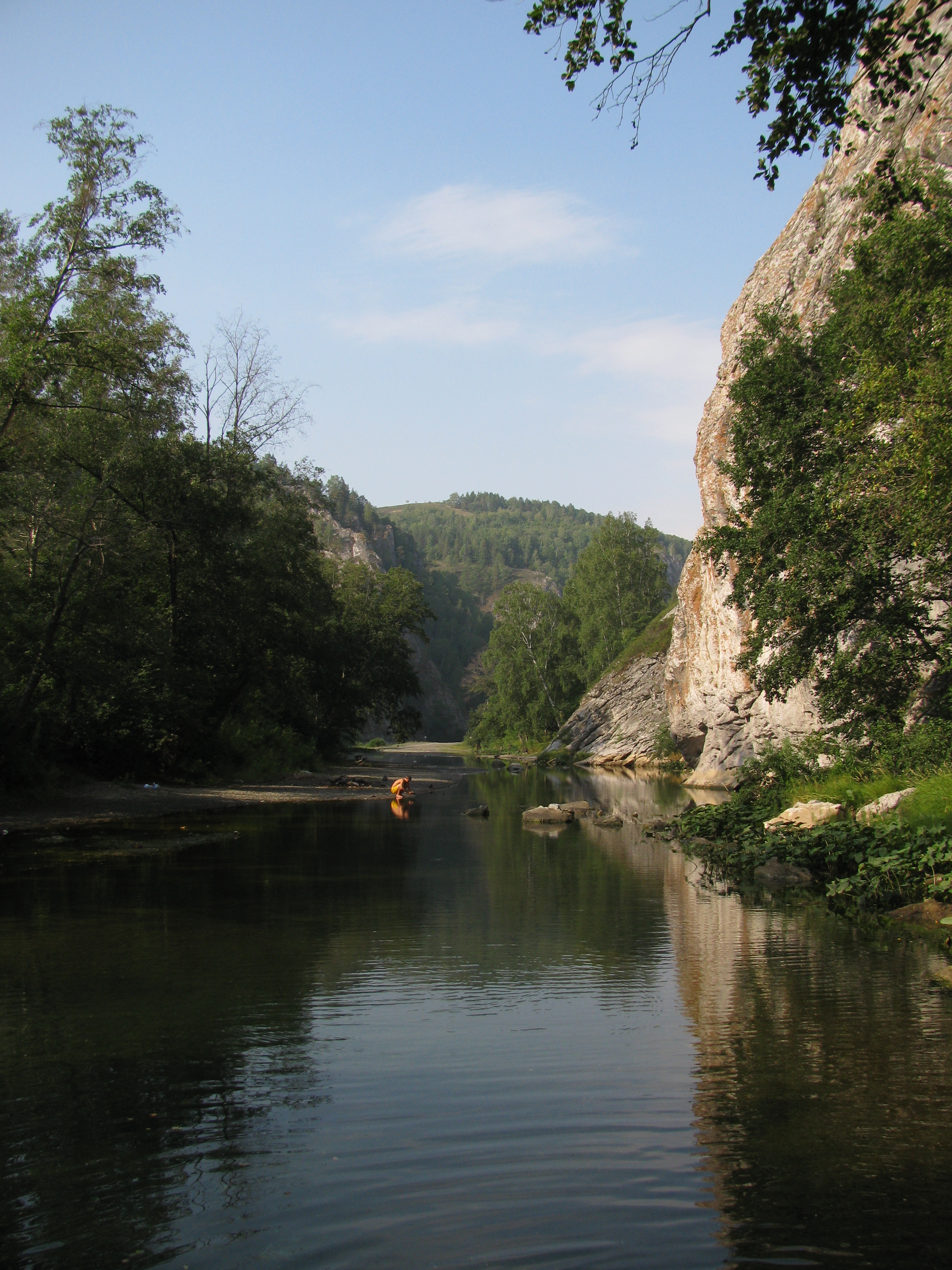
The Big Eyyek River

Yemesh experienced several hardships, including the deaths of her mother, father, and older sister Yanesh, as well as living with a stepmother. Throughout the novel, she reacts to these events with resilience. Influenced by folk art, Yemesh is interested in nature, language, and folk music. As a student, she focuses on her classes, lectures, social work, reading, and her own creative writing. The character is depicted by Biisheva as having a complex emotional life.

In the first novel of the trilogy ("humiliation") portrayed life Bashkir village pre-revolutionary period (until 1917). In the foreground is the theme of a small, socially disadvantaged person. As the researcher R. Baimov, " an epic narrative looseness allows for broad show in the novel of life and customs, social and intimate family relationships, social traditions and new trends."

Logical continuation of the "humiliation" is the novel " The Big Eyyek " (Bashkir option called "Awakening"; Eyyek River). It has the features of historical and revolutionary product. While Zainab Biisheva main stops its attention on events occurring in normal Bashkir village rather than in rows of red and white. History can be seen here through the peasant mentality and way of life.

Novel " Yemesh" dedicated youth of the protagonist. Action considerable part of the product is transferred to Orenburg. In his work reflected the tumultuous events of the 20- 30s, there is a certain idealization of the era.

Over 60 of her books have been published in the languages of the peoples of Russia and the world.

== Memory ==
- The Bashkir book publishing house Kitap is named after Zainab Biisheva.
- In Ufa, a monument to Z. Biisheva on October Avenue.
- In Ufa, Sibay, Baymak, Mrakovo (Kugarchinsky district of Bashkortostan) there are streets of Z. Biisheva.
- Secondary school No. 140 of the city of Ufa is named after Zainab Bisheva.
- In the village of Mrakovo, the secondary school and the music school are named after Z. Biisheva.
- The annual literary prize of the Kugarchinsky district of Bashkortostan named after Z. Biisheva.
- In the village of Tuembet of the Kugarchinsky district of Bashkortostan there is a house-museum of Z. Biisheva.
- Director and screenwriter Amir Abdrazakov made the documentary Our Zainab (2008)
- The Bashkir Book Publishing House Kitap published a book-photo album "Zainab Bisheva. Life and work." (2008)

== Bibliography ==
- Alibaev S.A. Zainab Biisheva: life and work / S.A. Alibaev. - Ufa: Kitap, 1993 .--p. 285.
- Biisheva, L. Together with his people / L. Biisheva // Ufa. - 2008. - No. 12. - p. 72-73.
- Zainab Biisheva: biobibliogr. decree. / Nat. bk them. A.-Z. Validi RB; comp. G. S. Akhmadiev; open ed. T.A. Khaliullina. - Ufa: RIO NB RB, 2008 .-- 134 p. - On the bash. and Russian. lang
- Zainab Biisheva. Life and work: photo album: on bash. and Russian. lang / comp. K. Aralbaev, G. Galimova, I. Kinyabulatov; artist A.L. Chudinov. - Ufa: Kitap, 2009 .-- 255 p. : col. il., ph.
- Kilmukhametov T. Talent. Work. Wisdom: on the 100th anniversary of the birth of the national writer of Bashkortostan Zainab Biisheva / T. Kilmukhametov // Vatandash. - 2008. - No. 1. - S. 51–55.
- People's writer Zainab Biisheva / comp. I. L. Kinyabulatov, G. A. Khisamov. - Ufa: Kitap, 2008 .-- 360 p.
- Uzikov Yu. The house where Z. A. Biisheva lived / Yu. Uzikov // Historical Monuments of Ufa. - Ufa, 1999 .-- S. 121–122.
- Zainab Biisheva Street // Ufa. The streets of our city. - Ufa: Informreklama, 2011 .-- S. 18.

== Works ==
- Biisheva Z. A. Works: in 5 vol. / З. А. Биишева. - Уфа : Китап, 1995–2007. – on Bashkir
- Biisheva, Z. A. Let's be friends: a story / Зайнаб Биишева; [пер. с башк. А. Леонтьева]; худож. Азат Мухтаруллин. - Уфа : Китап, 2018. - 328 с. : портр., цв. ил.; 27 см. - on Bashkir and Russian
- Biisheva Z. A. Let's be friends / З. А. Биишева; сост. И. А. Шарапов. - Уфа : Китап, 2008. - 338 с. - (Школьная библиотека)- on Russian.
- Biisheva Z. A. Emesh: trilogy / З. А. Биишева; пер. с башк. Ю. Аминова. - Уфа : Китап, 1998. - 320 с- on Russian.
- Biisheva, Z. A. Living letters / З. А. Биишева. - Уфа : Аркаим, 2013. - 40 с. : цв.ил. - on Bashkir.
- Biisheva, Z. A. Favorites / Зайнаб Биишева. - Уфа : Китап, 2009. - 384 с.- on Russian.
- Bisheva, Z. A. Flying carriage: tales / З. А. Биишева. - Уфа : Аркаим, 2013. - 113 с. : ил. - on Bashkir.
- Bisheva, Z. A. Love and Hate: Stories / З. А. Биишева. - Уфа : Аркаим, 2013. - 75 с. : ил. - on Bashkir.
- Biisheva, Z. A. Master and apprentice: for children of middle and senior school age / З. А. Биишева; худож. А. Василов. - Уфа : Китап, 2013. - 119 с. : цв.ил. - on Bashkir, English, Russian.
- Biisheva, Z. A. Monologue: poems / З. А. Биишева. - Уфа : Уфимский полиграфкомбинат, 2014. - 110 с. - on Bashkir.
- Biisheva, Z. A. Tale of a girl of happiness / З. А. Биишева. - Уфа : Аркаим, 2013. - 46 с. - on Bashkir.
- Biisheva Z. A. At the Big Eyyek: novel / З. А. Биишева; пер. с башк. Ю. Аминова. - Уфа : Китап, 2009. - 302 с. - (Народная книга)- on Russian.
- Biisheva, Z. A. At the Big Eyyek: novel / З. А. Биишева; пер. с башк. Ю. Аминова. - Уфа : Башкирское книжное издательство, 1985. - 376 с. - (Библиотека башкирского романа)- on Russian.

== Links ==
- Биишева Зайнаб - Культурный мир Башкортостана
- Зайнаб Биишева - Гордость района - Биографии - Каталог статей - Сайт Отдела культуры
- ufalit.ufa-lib.ru › ulica-zajnab-biishevoj
- Зайнаб Биишева
