= West Siberian Commissariat =

Siberian government in 1918

West Siberian Commissariat Западно-Сибирский комиссариат
- Feb 1 1918–Jun 30 1918
- Flag

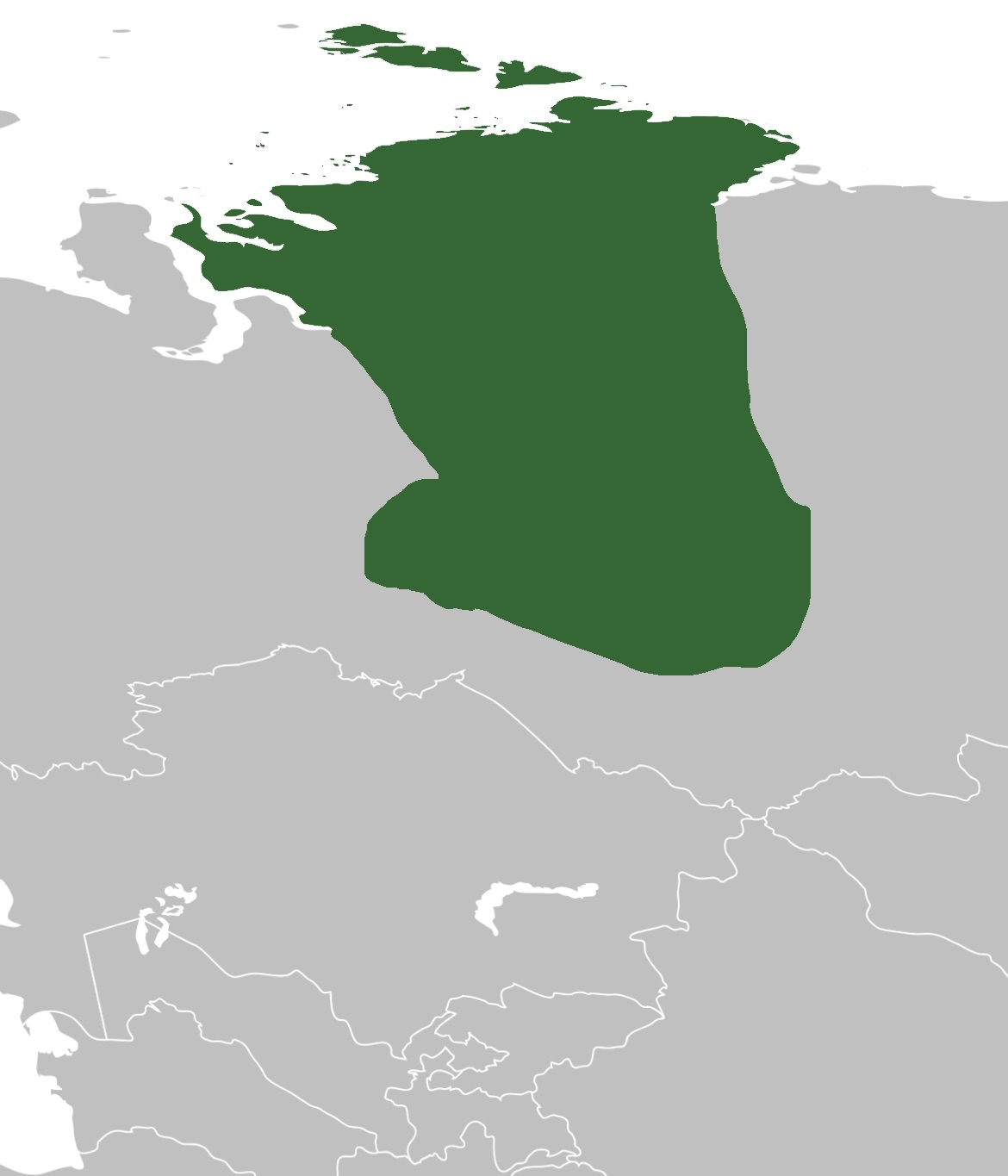
- Possible territory of the WSC not exact
- Status: Provisional anti-Bolshevik government
- Capital: Tomsk (initial underground); Novo-Nikolaevsk (late May–mid-June); Omsk (mid-June onward)
- Common languages: Russian
- Government: Provisional collegial commissariat
- Plenipotentiaries
  - 1918: Pavel Mikhailov, Boris Markov, Mikhail Lindberg,Vasily Sidorov
- Historical era: Russian Civil War
  - Formed underground by Pyotr Derber: Feb 1 1918
  - Power transferred to Provisional Siberian Government: Jun 30 1918
- Currency: Russian rubles
| Preceded by | Succeeded by |
| Russian Soviet Federative Socialist Republic | Provisional Siberian Government (Omsk) |
- Today part of: Russia

The West Siberian Commissariat (Russian: Западно-Сибирский комиссариат, abbreviated ZSK) was a short-lived anti-Bolshevik provisional government in western Siberia during the Russian Civil War. Established underground on February 1, 1918, by Pyotr Derber, chairman of the Provisional Siberian Government, it emerged openly on May 26, 1918, following the Revolt of the Czechoslovak Legion. Led by Socialist Revolutionary Party (SR) members, it aimed to restore democratic institutions, resist Bolshevik control, and prepare for the resumption of the All-Russian Constituent Assembly. Its policies balanced socialist ideals, such as protecting land reforms, with pragmatic measures like partial denationalization of industry. On June 30, 1918, it transferred power to the Provisional Siberian Government (Omsk) under Pyotr Vologodsky, reflecting a conservative shift in the Siberian White movement. Its brief tenure highlighted ideological tensions between leftist democratic aspirations and emerging authoritarian tendencies.

== Formation ==
The West Siberian Commissariat was secretly formed in Tomsk on February 1, 1918 (Old Style), by Pyotr Derber as Bolsheviks consolidated power in Siberia. Derber, a "right" SR and chairman of the Provisional Siberian Government elected by the Siberian Regional Duma, appointed four SR plenipotentiaries to operate clandestinely: Pavel Mikhailov, Boris Markov, Mikhail Lindberg, and Vasily Sidorov, three of whom were All-Russian Constituent Assembly delegates from Tomsk Governorate. Derber hesitated to include Markov due to his dogmatism and Lindberg and Mikhailov for perceived Bolshevik sympathies but proceeded due to limited options. The commissariat remained underground until the Czechoslovak Legion's revolt on May 25–26, 1918, toppled Bolshevik control in cities like Novo-Nikolaevsk (modern Novosibirsk) and Omsk. On May 27, Bolsheviks arrested Markov, Mikhailov, and Sidorov in Tomsk, leaving Lindberg to issue initial decrees in Novo-Nikolaevsk. The full leadership was announced on June 1, 1918, with a declaration proclaiming western Siberia "cleansed of Bolsheviks" and affirming loyalty to a democratic federal Russian republic. Some sources cite May 30 as the founding date due to a protocol establishing executive departments, but February 1 is supported by primary documents.

== Activities and administration ==
Headquartered initially in Tomsk, the commissariat relocated to Novo-Nikolaevsk by June 4–5, 1918, for its strategic position on the Trans-Siberian Railway, then to Omsk after its liberation on June 7. It established departments for military affairs, finance, justice, food supply, trade, industry, labor, agriculture, transport, and indigenous affairs, staffed by non-partisan experts (e.g., professors and economists) to enhance legitimacy. Local commissioners operated in cities like Tomsk, Tyumen, and Omsk. The commissariat restored pre-Bolshevik zemstvo and city councils, repealed select Soviet decrees, and denationalized non-essential industries while preserving SR-backed land committees. Key decrees included Order No. 1 (June 1, 1918) on judicial restoration, a June 14 military organization order, and a June 16 resolution promoting collegial governance and worker protections. It convened public figures to address finances, food shortages, and railway operations, and sought coalitions with Social Democrats and regionalists, though right-wing and union resistance limited success. The commissariat balanced socialist policies (e.g., retaining workers' councils as professional bodies) with privatization, sparking internal debates. A proposed Administrative Council was abandoned due to SR objections to bureaucratic expansion. By late June, policies shifted rightward, abolishing collectives for sole leadership and excluding Bolsheviks from local governance.

== Dissolution ==
On June 30, 1918, the commissariat transferred its authority to the Provisional Siberian Government in Omsk, led by Pyotr Vologodsky. The handover, driven by the need for unified anti-Bolshevik command, was peaceful despite SR concerns over the new government's conservatism. A July 1 charter praised the commissariat for establishing civil and military structures and uniting diverse factions with Czechoslovak support. The transition marked the decline of SR influence in Siberia's White movement.

== Government and politics ==
The commissariat was a collegial body led by four SR plenipotentiaries: Pavel Mikhailov (often acting chairman), Boris Markov, Mikhail Lindberg, and Vasily Sidorov. Aligned with the Siberian Regional Duma's federalist platform, it advocated land reform, democratic elections, and Entente alliances to bolster legitimacy. Its "dual" nature-socialist rhetoric versus pragmatic administration, caused friction, particularly over property restitution and workers' rights. Mikhailov's leadership in institution-building and Markov's party loyalty shaped its brief tenure, while non-partisan department heads ensured operational efficiency.

== Military history ==
The West Siberian Commissariat prioritized military reorganization to counter Bolshevik forces during its brief existence from February 1 to June 30, 1918, drawing on Socialist Revolutionary (SR) principles while integrating with the Czechoslovak Legion and local volunteers. It established a military department under Ivan Fomin, an SR officer, but faced challenges due to limited experience and resources. The Commissariat's efforts laid the foundation for the Siberian Army, which was formally organized under Colonel Aleksey Grishin-Almazov by mid-June 1918. This subordination of civilian authority to military needs foreshadowed the White movement's authoritarian shift.

=== Armed forces ===
The West Siberian Commissariat's armed forces were modest, reflecting its short lifespan and provisional nature. Initially, it relied heavily on the Czechoslovak Legion, which numbered approximately 50,000 troops across Siberia by mid-1918, providing the bulk of combat-ready forces during the Legion's revolt. Local volunteer units, mobilized through decrees like the June 14, 1918, order, added an estimated 3,000–5,000 recruits, primarily officers and Cossacks from Omsk, Novo-Nikolaevsk (modern Novosibirsk), and Tyumen. By late June, the nascent Siberian Army under Grishin-Almazov had grown to approximately 10,000–15,000 men, including integrated Legion detachments, though exact figures are uncertain due to incomplete records. These forces were organized into small detachments for railway security and local anti-Bolshevik operations, with a total effective strength in western Siberia estimated at under 20,000, excluding Legion support. After the handover to the Provisional Siberian Government (Omsk) on June 30, 1918, the Siberian Army expanded significantly, reaching up to 683,000 (including non-combat ready) by June 1919, but this growth occurred post-WSC.

=== Advancements ===
The Commissariat introduced several military advancements to build a disciplined force from scratch, departing from Bolshevik models while incorporating SR democratic elements. The June 14, 1918, decree abolished SR-appointed commissars in favor of unified command under professional officers, addressing right-wing resistance and improving efficiency. It emphasized voluntary recruitment, officer mobilization, and securing supply lines along the Trans-Siberian Railway, leveraging Czechoslovak Legion expertise in logistics and tactics. Technological advancements were limited but included requisitions of Bolshevik armories, securing an estimated 5,000–10,000 rifles, machine guns, and artillery pieces by late June. Administrative innovations, such as collegial decision-making in the military department and protections for soldiers' rights (e.g., labor conditions), briefly balanced socialist ideals with pragmatism, though these were curtailed by the conservative shift under the Omsk government. These reforms formed the basis for the Siberian Army's structure, influencing White military policy in Siberia.

=== Engagements ===
Given its brief tenure, the West Siberian Commissariat engaged in limited direct combat, focusing on consolidation and preparation amid the Czechoslovak Legion's revolt. Most "engagements" were bloodless takeovers of Bolshevik-held cities, facilitated by the Legion's advance along the Trans-Siberian Railway. Key actions included:

- Novo-Nikolaevsk Seizure (May 26–27, 1918): Local anti-Bolshevik forces, coordinated by WSC plenipotentiary Mikhail Lindberg, overthrew Soviet authorities in Novo-Nikolaevsk without significant fighting, marking the entity's public emergence.
- Omsk Coup (June 7, 1918): Led by Colonel Pavel Ivanov-Rinov and supported by the Legion (approximately 8,000 troops), this swift, non-violent operation captured Omsk from fleeing Bolsheviks, establishing the WSC's headquarters. No major casualties were reported.
- Railway Security Operations (June 1918): Small detachments of 500–1,000 volunteers conducted patrols and skirmishes to secure supply lines from Tyumen to Tomsk, clashing sporadically with Red partisans in rural areas. These were minor guerrilla encounters rather than pitched battles.
- Integration with Legion Actions: The WSC indirectly supported the Legion's broader revolt, including the capture of Chelyabinsk (May 25) and Tomsk (May 31), providing administrative backing but not frontline troops.

No large-scale battles occurred under WSC command, as its role was preparatory. Total casualties were likely under 100, emphasizing rapid stabilization over offensive warfare. These efforts transitioned into the Provisional Siberian Government (Omsk)'s campaigns after June 30.

== Legacy ==
The West Siberian Commissariat was a fleeting "leftist" phase in Siberia's anti-Bolshevik movement, embodying SR democratic ideals amid civil war chaos. Its administrative and military frameworks laid the groundwork for the Provisional Siberian Government's consolidation, though its dissolution signaled a conservative turn. Historian V.I. Shishkin critiques Soviet-era distortions, emphasizing its role in regional autonomy debates. Norman Pereira notes its significance as a bridge between revolutionary democracy and White authoritarianism. Primary documents, preserved in Shishkin's 2005 collection, remain key sources for studying early White resistance in Siberia.

== See also ==
- Russian Civil War
- White movement
- Siberian regionalism
- Czechoslovak Legion
- Provisional Siberian Government (Omsk)
- Socialist Revolutionary Party
- Siberian Army
