= Gabdulla Amantay =

Bashkir poet, writer and playwright (born 1907)

- Born: Gabdulla Sahipgareevich Amantayev; 23 July 1907; Upper Ilyasova village, Buzuluksky Uyezd, Samara Governorate, Russian Empire (now Krasnogvardeysky District, Orenburg Oblast, Russia)
- Died: 7 October 1938 (aged 31); Ufa, Bashkir Republic, (now Bashkortostan, Russia)
- Citizenship: Russian Empire, USSR
- Education: Orenburg Bashkir Pedagogical College Leningrad Institute of Philosophy and Linguistics(1928–1931) madrassas Hussainiya
- Occupations: poet, novelist, playwright, librettist
- Writing career
- Notable works: collection of poems, "Songs of Struggle", 1927

Gabdulla Amantay (Bashkir: Ғабдулла Амантай, born as Gabdulla Sahipgareevich Amantayev, 23 July 1907 – 10 October 1938) was a Bashkir poet, writer and playwright.

In 1937, he was arrested for his views on the protection of the people. He was rehabilitated posthumously, only in the 1990s.

== Creation ==
His scientific works are devoted to the principles of the definition of national literature, problems in the study of Bashkir folklore and literary language.

== Education ==
- Husainiya madrassas
- Orenburg Bashkir Pedagogical College
- 1928-1931 he studied at the Oriental Department of the Leningrad Institute of Philosophy and Linguistics
