= Guinan Khairy =

Bashkir poet, writer and playwright

- Born: 15 June 1903; Starokulevo village, Ufa Governorate, Russian Empire (now Bashkortostan, Russia)
- Died: October 16, 1938 (aged 35); Ufa, Bashkir Republic, (now Bashkortostan, Russia)
- Citizenship: Russian Empire, USSR
- Education: Orenburg Bashkir Pedagogical College; Bashkir State University
- Occupation: poet

Guinan Khairy (Bashkir: Ғайнан Хәйри; 15 June 1903 - 16 October 1938) was a Bashkir poet, writer and playwright.

== Biography ==
Khairy attended a Madrasa, and after graduation, attended the Orenburg Bashkir Pedagogical College for higher education. In 1923, while a student at the pedagogical college, he wrote and published his first poems in 1923.

In 1927 he worked as an editor of the newspaper Bashkortostan yeshtere (Youth of Bashkortostan).

In 1937, he was arrested for views on the protection of the people. He was rehabilitated posthumously, only in the late 1990s.
