= Sibir Battalion =

- Батальон «Сибирь» (Russian); Батальйон «Сибір» (Ukrainian)
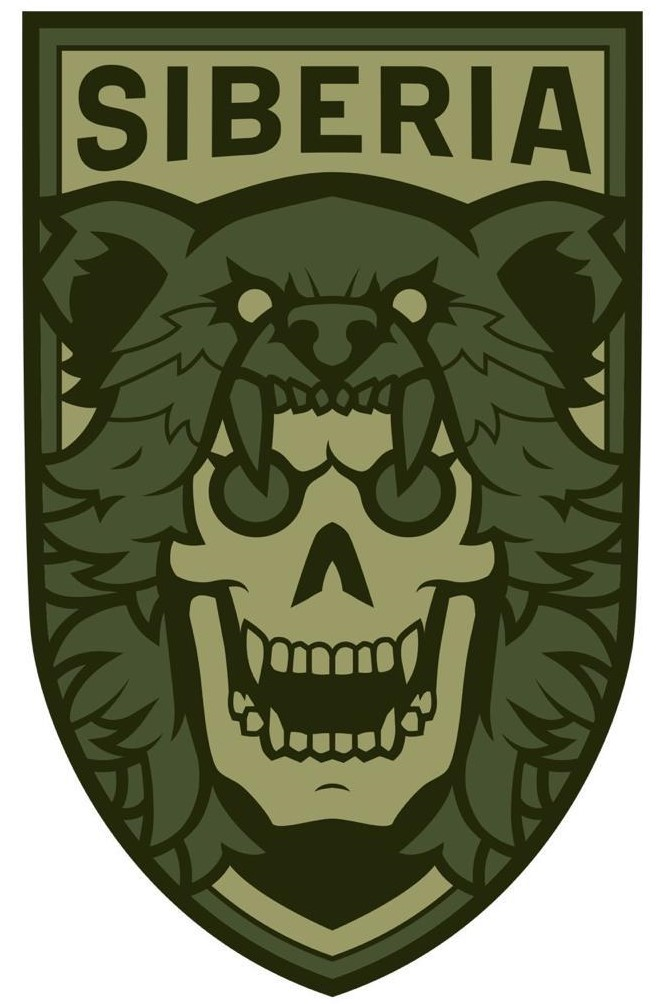
- Founded: October 2023
- Allegiance: Ukraine
- Type: Infantry
- Size: ~60
- Part of: International Legion of the Defence Intelligence of Ukraine
- Engagements: Russo-Ukrainian War; Russian invasion of Ukraine; Battle of Avdiivka; March 2024 Western Russia incursion
- Website: https://sibbat.com/

Commanders
- Current commander: Vladislav Ammosov

Insignia
- Flag

- Patch (2023–2024)

The Sibir Battalion (Ukrainian: Батальйон «Сибір», romanized: Batalion "Sybir", lit. 'Siberian Battalion'; Russian: Батальон «Сибирь», romanized: Batalon "Sibir") is a paramilitary group made up of Russian citizens opposed to the Putin regime. Members of this unit include Russians, Yakuts, and Buryats, who see Ukraine's victory as an opportunity to gain independence or wide autonomy from Russia. Before signing a contract, citizens of the Russian Federation undergo a thorough inspection, which can last up to a year. The battalion does not recruit captured Russian soldiers. The unit fought in the Battle of Avdiivka. On 12 March 2024, the unit participated in a raid into the Kursk and Belgorod regions of Russia alongside the Freedom of Russia Legion.

The commander of the battalion is Vladislav Ammosov. He is an ethnic Yakut, and claims to have worked in Russia's GRU foreign military intelligence agency for 15 years. He fought in the First and Second Chechen wars. Ammosov supports independence for his native Sakha (Yakutia).

The Sibir battalion uses the unofficial flag of Siberia, a diagonal white-green bicolor.

== See also ==
- Free Nations of Post-Russia Forum
- International Legion (Ukraine)
- Russian Freedom Legion
- Russian Volunteer Corps
- National Republican Army (Russia)
- Karelian National Battalion
