= Vladislav Ammosov =

Sakha separatist

Personal details
- Born: Yakutsk, Yakut ASSR, Russian SFSR, Soviet Union

Military service
- Allegiance: Russia (1991–2014); Ukraine (2022–present)
- Branch/service: Russian Ground Forces; GRU; International Legion; Sibir Battalion
- Years of service: 1994–present
- Rank: Commander of Sibir Battalion
- Commands: Sibir Battalion (2023–present)
- Battles/wars: First Chechen War; Second Chechen War; Russo-Ukrainian War; War in Donbas; Russian invasion of Ukraine; March 2024 western Russia incursion

Vladislav Ammosov (Russian: Владислав Аммосов) is a former GRU officer from Yakutia (Sakha Republic) who is the current commanding officer of the Sibir Battalion.

== Military career ==
Vladislav Ammosov fought in both the First and Second Chechen Wars while serving in the GRU. After the annexation of Crimea and the subsequent war in Donbas, Ammosov decided to leave the Russian military. He said in an interview: "I left the reserve before 2014, when it finally became clear that this state and I have different paths. The seizure of Crimea and the aggression in Donbas looked like agony. It was already clear that the empire was disintegrating and would soon die. After all, Russia's violation of international agreements meant that no one would comply with them when it concerned Russia. What is stopping my republic from holding a referendum and seceding from Russia? Yakutia will likely have to survive on its own in the future." On 24 February 2022, when Russia invaded Ukraine, he saw it as an opportunity for Siberia to gain independence from Russia and decided to fight alongside Ukraine. After a background check, he became the commander of the newly formed Sibir Battalion. In 2024 he led the Sibir Battalion in an incursion into Russian territory from Ukraine.

== Politics ==
Vladislav Ammosov has stated that he wants to see the collapse of the Russian Federation and establish an independent Yakutia.
