= Flag of Siberia =

Unofficial Russian regional flag

- Use: National flag and ensign normal
- Proportion: 7:10 (mostly used)
- Adopted: August 5, 1917
- The light-green version

The Flag of Siberia (Russian: Флаг Сибири, romanized: Flag Sibiri) is the unofficial flag used to represent the region of Siberia. This flag first became widely used during the Russian Civil War and the short-lived Siberian Republic. After it failed, the flag continued to represent sentiments of Siberian regionalism.

== Flag characteristic ==
=== Description ===
The flag is usually displayed with a diagonal split from the top-left to the bottom-right, where the white is on the bottom-left and the green on the top-right.

=== Colour ===
| Colors | White | Green |
|---|---|---|
| RGB | 255 255 255 | 000 128 000 |
| HTML | FFFFFF | 008000 |
| HSV | 0 0 100 | 120 100 51 |

- White — represents snow
- Green — represents Taiga

== History ==
=== Creation ===
In 1853, a flag of white-green horizontal stripes first appeared as the flag of the Siberian student community of Kazan University. The likely source of the coloring originates in the coat of arms of Tomsk Oblast, where most of the students came from.

Then in the 1880s, the use of white-green flags spread to Siberian student meetings in St. Petersburg, led by Mr. N. M. Yadrintsev.

On August 5, 1917, a Conference of Siberian regionalist organizations took place, where the meeting unanimously approved the following as the official flag:

“The national Siberian flag is a combination of 2 colors: white and green. The white represents the Siberian snow, and the green represents the Siberian taiga. The flag is rectangular-shaped, which is divided by a diagonal traversing from the upper left to the lower right corner. The upper part will be green and the lower will be white”

=== Siberian Provisional Government ===
On January 28, 1918, the Provisional Siberian Government was elected, which included many anti-Soviet military and political organizations. This government used the white-green flag for much of its existence.

The Siberian flag was also flown on state buildings, and the Siberian Army's flag was also very similar, but with a Saint George's Cross.

On May 26, 1918, an armed uprising of the Czechoslovak Legion and the local Socialist Revolutionary officer squad began in Novonikolaevsk. White and green armbands became the identification mark for its participants. The West Siberian Commissariat of the Siberian Government declared that “according to the resolution of the Extraordinary Siberian Regional Congress, the colors of the flag of Autonomous Siberia, white and green, are established - the emblem of the snows and forests of Siberia”.

White and green symbols were often used in banners for military units. In the meeting room of the Siberian Regional Duma, a white and green banner was hung with the inscription “Through autonomous Siberia to the revival of a free Russia”, and a total of 207 white and green badges were made for the deputies.

The official character of the Siberian flag was recognized by both the Siberian government in Omsk and the Siberian government in Vladivostok. The resolution dated July 30, 1918, signed by the Chairman of the Council of Ministers P. Derber and Acting Secretary of State E. V. Zakharov stated: “To approve for promulgation the form of the Siberian flag adopted by the Tomsk Conference of public organizations of Siberia on August 5, 1917 (white-green), and along with the Siberian flag, it is permissible to hang the all-Russian tricolor flag".

=== Non-state use ===
On November 3, 1918, the Siberian Republic was officially dissolved, and so state use of the Siberian flag ended. However, this flag continues to be used unofficially. For example, on June 27, 1919, the Supreme Ruler of Russia Alexander Kolchak established the Order of the Liberation of Siberia. The symbol of the order was a green cross, with two stripes of ribbons, “one white, the other green”, reflecting the color scheme of the Siberian flag.

Until the beginning of 1920, some military units of the White Army retained Siberian banners and cockades on their headdresses. Towards the end of the Russian Civil War, some anti-Bolshevik partisans continued to wear white and green symbols.

During Soviet times, the flag or symbols derived from it were not used. However, since the collapse of the USSR, the flags of some administrative entities reflected the same color scheme as the Siberian flag.

Following the Russian Invasion of Ukraine, the Sibir Battalion, a battalion of the Ukrainian International Legion made up of volunteers from Siberia, use the flag.

== Gallery ==
=== Similar regional flags ===
Horizontal flag variant

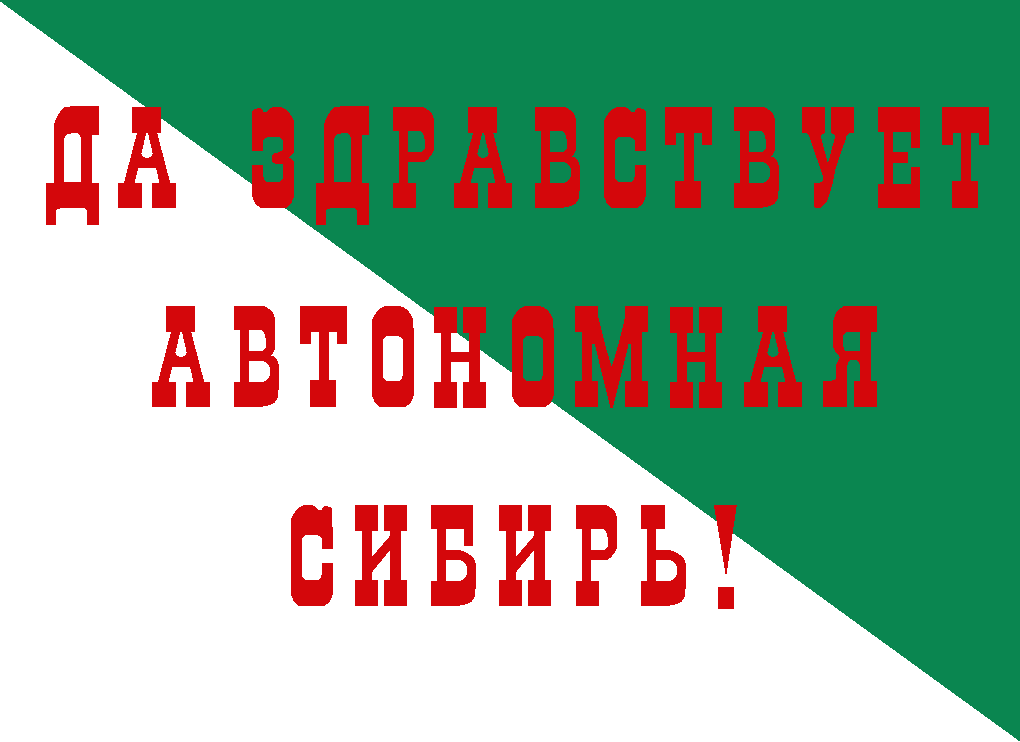
Flag of the Provisional Siberian Government in Vladivostok

Flag of the Tungus Republic

Flag of Novosibirsk

Coat of Arms of Ust-Orda Buryat Okrug

Flag of Kurgan Oblast

Flag of Kurgan

Flag of Megion

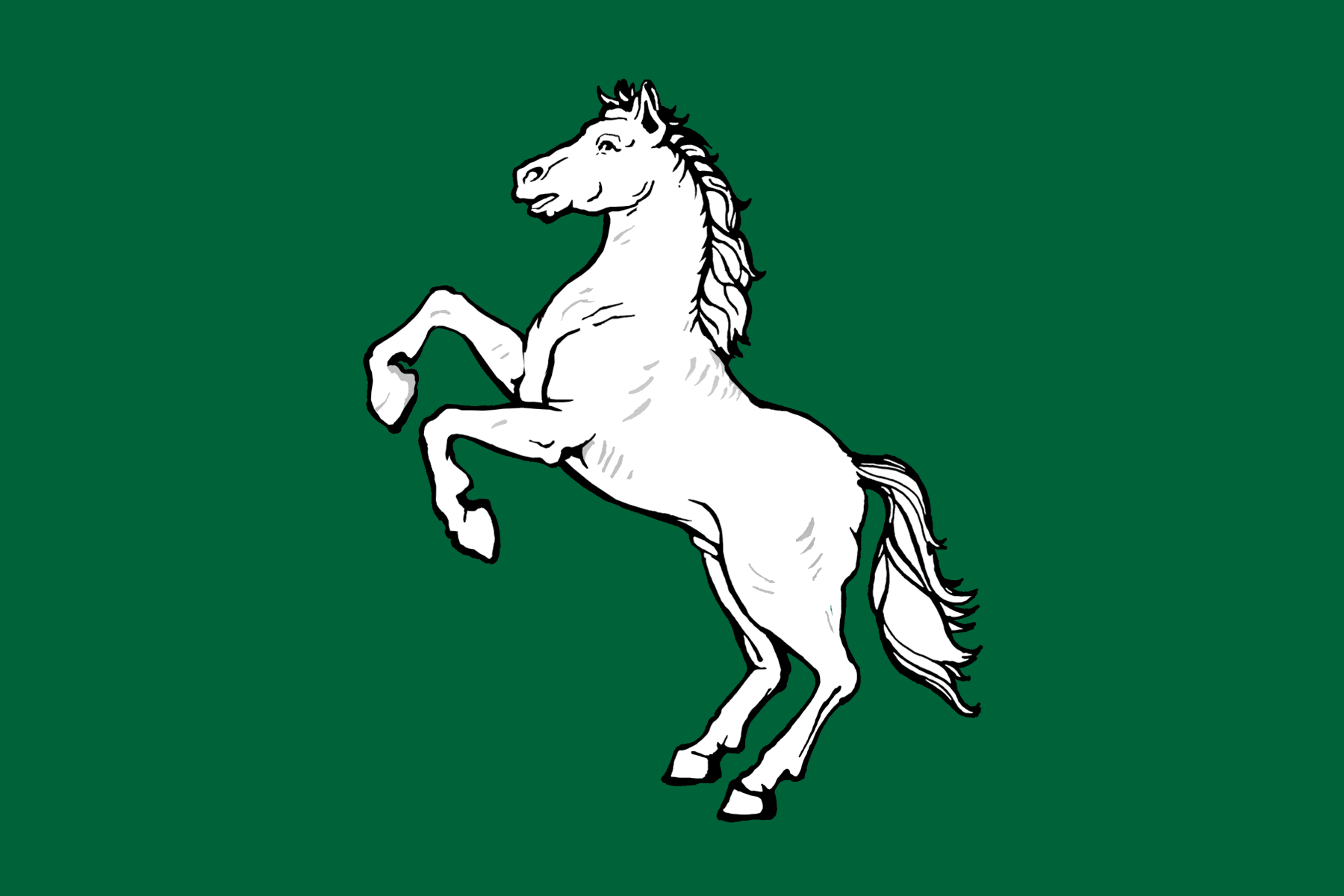
Flag of Tomsk

Flag of Karasuk

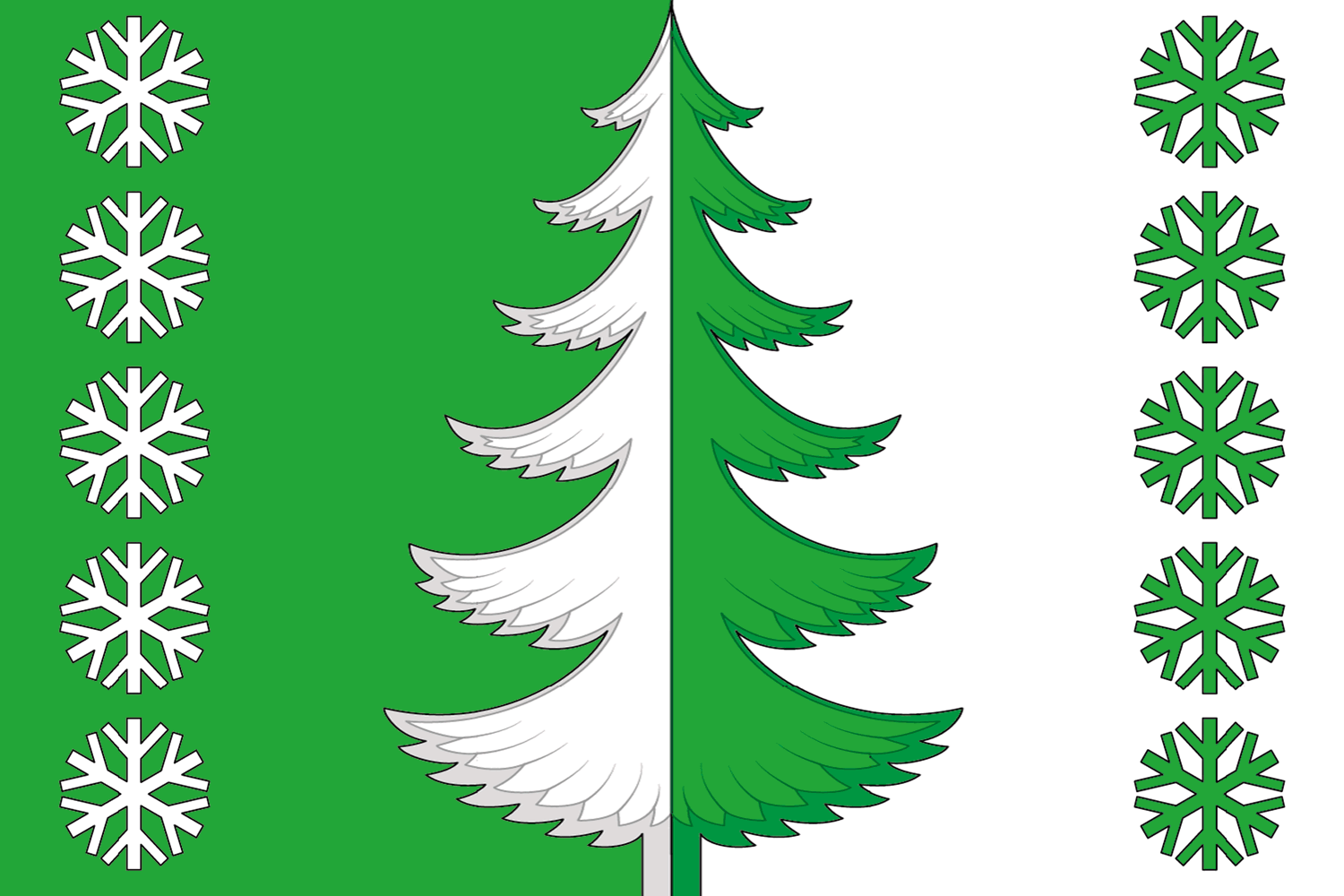
Flag of Vykatnoy
