= Orenburg Bashkir Pedagogical College =

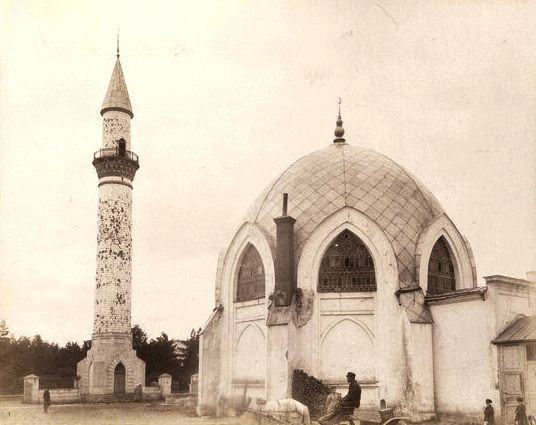

Location
- Park Avenue, 6 Orenburg, Orenburg Oblast 460000; Russia

Information
- Type: Day
- Established: 1920
- Headmaster: 1921–1923, 1926–1936 Sagid Rahmatovich Alibaev, 1923–1926 Ibragim Kypsak
- Staff: ~20
- Houses: Orenburg Caravanserai

Orenburg Bashkir Pedagogical College (Bashkir: Ырымбур башҡорт педагогия техникумы, Russian: Оренбургский башкирский педагогический техникум) is a school in Orenburg, worked in 1921–1936, respectively. Forge Bashkir national intelligentsia. Students are trained in the building Orenburg Caravanserai, historical and cultural monuments of the Bashkir people.

== Notable alumni ==
- Sagit Agish (1905–1973) - Bashkir writer
- Sagid R. Alibaev (1903—1975) - Soviet statesman and teacher
- Gabdulla Amantay (1907–1938) Bashkir writer
- Zainab Biisheva (1908–1996) – Bashkir writer
- Bayezit Bikbay (1909–1968) - Bashkir writer
- Guinan Khairy (1903—1938) - Bashkir writer
- Sabit Sufiyanov (1904–1974) - Bashkir writer
