= Abulyaisovo =

Abulyaisovo Абуляисово Әбүләйес
- Village
- Location within Bashkortostan Location within Russia
- Coordinates: 51°45′N 56°53′E
- Country: Russia
- Region: Bashkortostan
- District: Zianchurinsky District
- Time zone: UTC+5:00

Abulyaisovo (Russian: Абуляисово, Bashkir: Әбүләйес, Äbüläyes) is a rural locality (a village) in Abulyaisovsky Selsoviet, Zianchurinsky District, Bashkortostan, Russia. The population was 265 as of 2010. There are 10 streets.

== Geography ==
Abulyaisovo is located 60 km south of Isyangulovo (the district's administrative centre) by road. Malinovka is the nearest rural locality.

== Ethnicity ==
The village is inhabited by Bashkirs.
