= The First All-Russian Muslim Congress =

Muslim Congress

The First All-Russian Muslim Congress was a series of meetings held to discuss issues faced by Russian Muslims within the Russian Empire, from May 1 to May 11, 1917.

== Historical background ==
Following the February Revolution in Russia, the Provisional Government came to power and implemented significant administrative changes, removing unpopular officials and disbanding the police and gendarmerie forces. On March 20 (April 2), 1917, a decree was issued declaring the equality of all citizens. These reforms, along with the atmosphere of newfound freedom, led to an increase in political activity across the Russian Empire. Non-Russian peoples, especially those living in various regions of the empire, began to engage in national and political activities. Previously deprived of their rights, these communities now had to determine their own strategies in response to the new government.

Russia's defeat in the 1904-1905 Russo-Japanese War, followed by the 1905 Revolution, allowed groups opposing the tsarist regime and nations under tsarist rule to conduct their political activities more openly. While the war was still ongoing, meetings were organized in various cities throughout the country to restructure the state based on the principles of freedom and equality. Representatives of different opposition groups met with city officials in Moscow in October 1904 and later in St. Petersburg in November, where various decisions were taken. After the Moscow meeting, the demands of the Russian Turks were presented to the then Minister of the Interior, Svyatopolk-Mirsky. Mirsky received these demands favourably and requested an official application regarding them. This event initiated the process of electing representatives for Russian Turks.

In August 1905, the First Russian Muslim Congress convened in Nizhniy Novgorod, leading to the establishment of Ittifaq al-Muslimin (Union of the Muslims of Russia), the first political party representing Muslims in Russia. This organization was predominantly managed by the Tatars and aligned with the Russian Constitutional Democrats (Cadets). In April 1906, the leaders of the party were elected to the Duma, where they created a joint Muslim faction that operated in all four successive Dumas until February 1917. Both Ittifaq al-Muslimin and the Muslim faction were significantly influenced by jadidism, particularly from the Volga-Ural region. Additionally, some members hailed from the official clergy and the Muslim elite across Crimea, Central Asia, the Caucasus, and the Steppe governor-generalship. These elected representatives organized five congresses under the name of Muslim Congresses between 1905 and 1917. Under these changing conditions, the congress held from May 1 to May 11, 1917, was organized as a general assembly with participation from all Turks and Muslims living in Russia. For this reason, it was called the "All-Russian Muslim Congress."

== Organization and key participants ==
The First All-Russian Muslim Congress, which took place in Moscow from May 1 to May 11 and lasted for eleven days, was held in a building that was gifted to the Muslims of Moscow by Shamsi Asadullayev, an Azerbaijani philanthropist. Delegates from various regions participated in the congress, including the Caucasus, Crimea, Kazakhstan, Lithuanian Tatars, Muslims from Central Russia and Siberia, as well as representatives from Turkestan, Bukhara, and Khiva. More than 900 delegates were selected from various organizations, such as political committees, charitable associations, cultural institutions, cooperatives, the Muslim Military Committee, and student unions. Among the selected delegates, 300 were religious leaders, and 112 were women delegates. All prominent Muslim leaders attended the congress, including Ahmet Tsalikov, Ayaz Ishaki, Zeki Velidi Togan, Mahammad Amin Rasulzade, Musa Jarullah Bigiev, and Alimjan Barodi.

The presidium of the congress consisted of 12 members: Ibrahim Ahtemov (Ufa), Ilyas Alkin, Ahmed Tsalikov, Salima Yakubova (Kazan), Musa Jarullah Bigiev, Molla Hasan Gabeshi (Kazan Province), Khalil Dosmukhamedov (Ural region), Ayaz Ishaki (Moscow), Fatih Karimov (Orenburg), Cafer Saidakhmetov (Crimea), Alimardan Topchubashov (Baku), and Abdullah Khodjaev (Turkestan).

The congress was attended by representatives from all parties and leftist factions, except for the Bolsheviks. This included the Cadets, Socialist Revolutionaries (SR), Mensheviks, and others. Nine sections were established to work during the congress:

1. The Internal State Structure of Russia
2. Labor Issues
3. Agricultural Issues
4. Women's Issues
5. Preparation for the Constituent Assembly Elections
6. Military Issues
7. Religious Issues
8. Education
9. Local Governance

== Resolution and decision ==
The representatives presented their differing views on the issues of the Internal State Structure of Russia and Local Governance. Representatives from the rural areas endorsed the idea of federating the regions. The Muslims from the Volga-Ural area advocated for the establishment of a unified religious autonomy and a collective representative body for Russian Muslims, as well as national and cultural autonomy. Meanwhile, the leaders of the Kazakh mountaineers in the North Caucasus emphasized the importance of territorial autonomy to preserve their traditions and lands. Additionally, the efforts of Azerbaijanis aimed at broadening their autonomy, evolving from religious autonomy to extensive regional self-governance, ultimately sought to transform Russia into a federal republic.

Following the voting, the federal system proposed by M.A.Rasulzade was accepted with 446 votes in favor and 271 against. The All-Russian Muslim Conference, having discussed the issue of the form of state administration in Russia, resolved:

- To recognize that the form of state construction in Russia best suited to the interests of Muslim nationalities is a democratic republic organized on a national-territorial-federative basis. Nationalities that do not have a definite territory are to exercise national cultural self-determination.
- To regulate general spiritual and cultural questions regarding Russia’s Muslim nationalities and to advance their solidarity, a central general Muslim institution with legislative powers must be founded for all of Russia.
- The form, composition, and function of this institution will be determined by the first constituent congress of representatives from all of Russia’s autonomous units.

Labor issues were resolved in line with the demands of left-wing parties: establishing an 8-hour workday, providing 42 consecutive hours of rest each week, banning child labour, prohibiting women from working in jobs hazardous to their health, abolishing the penal system, implementing a pension system, and instituting worker inspection, among other measures.

The final solution to the agricultural issue was deferred until the Constituent Assembly, with the condition that, until that time, the resolutions approved by the All-Russian Peasant Congress had to be followed.

During the discussions on women's issues at the Congress, intense debates took place. A majority supported the complete liberation of women and the granting of full citizenship rights to them, while a minority opposed women's equality and freedom. At the Congress, where female delegates also took the floor, notable figures such as A.Ishaki, S.Maksudi, and E.Muhutdinova, along with Tatar religious representatives A.Barudi and M.Bigiev, adopted a favourable stance toward gender equality. By majority vote, progressive decisions were made on issues such as the prohibition of polygamy, the elimination of bride price, the banning of marriage for young girls, women’s right to vote and stand for election, and women’s right to dress freely. A petition with 226 signatures was submitted to the Congress presidency in protest of these decisions.

In military issues, decisions were made to abolish conscription, establish Muslim military units, and ensure that soldiers serve within their own regions.

The All-Russian Muslim Council was established at the Congress on May 11, 1917. The Council's Executive Committee was tasked with supporting regional Muslim organizations across Russia, overseeing the Muslim Congresses' activities, and distributing Islamic literature. At the Milli Shuro (Moskow), 30 members were selected to represent Muslims from regions including Central Russia, Siberia, Turkestan, and Crimea. Delegates from the Caucasus and the Lithuanian Tatars delayed electing their representatives until their return. The council's composition at different times included notable figures such as S.Mamlaev (Ufa), Zeki Velidi Togan (representing Turkestan), D.Dosmukhamedov (Ural region), A.İshaki (Moscow), I.Lemanov (Crimea), Sh.Mukhamedyarov (Petrograd), V.Tanachev (Kazan, Bukeyev Horde representative from Astrahan), F.Khan Khoyski (Baku), U.Khocaev (Tashkent), A.Tsalikov (Petrograd), I. Shagiakhmetov (Turkestan), and Z.Şamil (Petrograd, representing the Caucasus). The president of the council was A.Ishaki. This Council was ultimately dissolved in March 1918.

After the discussions, a significant decision was made during the congress's meeting on May 9 regarding religious issues. It was decided that the religious administration would consist of one mufti and six qadis (Islamic judges). Alimjan Barudi was elected as the mufti by a majority vote. Among the selected qadis was also a woman named Mukhlisa Bubi, who became the first woman in Islamic history to be appointed to the position of qadi.

In terms of education, following the ideas of the reformist Ismail Gaspirali, it was decided that all Muslims in Russia would receive primary education in their native languages. Additionally, it was agreed that Ottoman Turkish would be used in higher education institutions.

== Impact and legacy ==
One of the key aspects of the congress was that it provided an open platform for the diverse representatives of nearly all Muslim communities in Russia, allowing them to express their differing views openly for the first time. The decisions made during this congress reflect the modernist ideas of Muslim intellectuals of that period, most of whom were of Turkic origin. The congress marked the introduction of several important innovations: For the first time, the appointment of a mufti was not made by the emperor but was instead determined through free elections. Muslims in Russia demonstrated a progressive stance on women’s rights by lifting restrictions specific to Islamic societies of that era, promoting an approach based on gender equality. Additionally, in a historic first in Islamic history, one of the highest spiritual positions within the Muslim community was occupied by a woman.

== Bibliography ==
- Akal, E. (2020). Müslüman komünistler: Petrograd - Kazan (1917–1918) (1st ed.). İstanbul: İletişim Yayınları.
- Bezer, G. (n.d.). Müslüman kongreleri. In İslam Ansiklopedisi (Vol. 32, pp. 96–98).
- Devlet, N. (2020). Rusya Türklerinin millî mücadele tarihi: 1905–1917 (4th ed., 7th series). Ankara: Türk Tarih Kurumu Yayınları.
- Hartley, J. M. (2020). The Volga: A history. New Haven: Yale University Press.
- Hickey, M. C. (Ed.). (2011). Competing voices from the Russian Revolution: Fighting words. California: Greenwood.
- Khabutdinov, A. Y., Imasheva, M. M., Fahrutdinov, B., Mustafina, D. A., Pirov, R. N., & Khabutdinova, M. M. (2019). Projects of state and political development of Muslims in Russia. Opción, 35(89), 561–573.
- Lieven, D. (Ed.). (2006). The Cambridge history of Russia. Vol. I: Imperial Russia, 1689–1917. Cambridge: Cambridge University Press.
- Sinenko, S. (2023, April 21). 1-ый Всероссийский мусульманский съезд. posredi.ru. Retrieved February 4, 2025, from https://posredi.ru
- Zamoiski, A. (2016). Islamic movements in the Russian Empire during and after the First World War. CENDARI Archival Research Guide.
