= Krasnogvardeysky District, Orenburg Oblast =

Krasnogvardeysky District Красногвардейский район (Russian)
- District
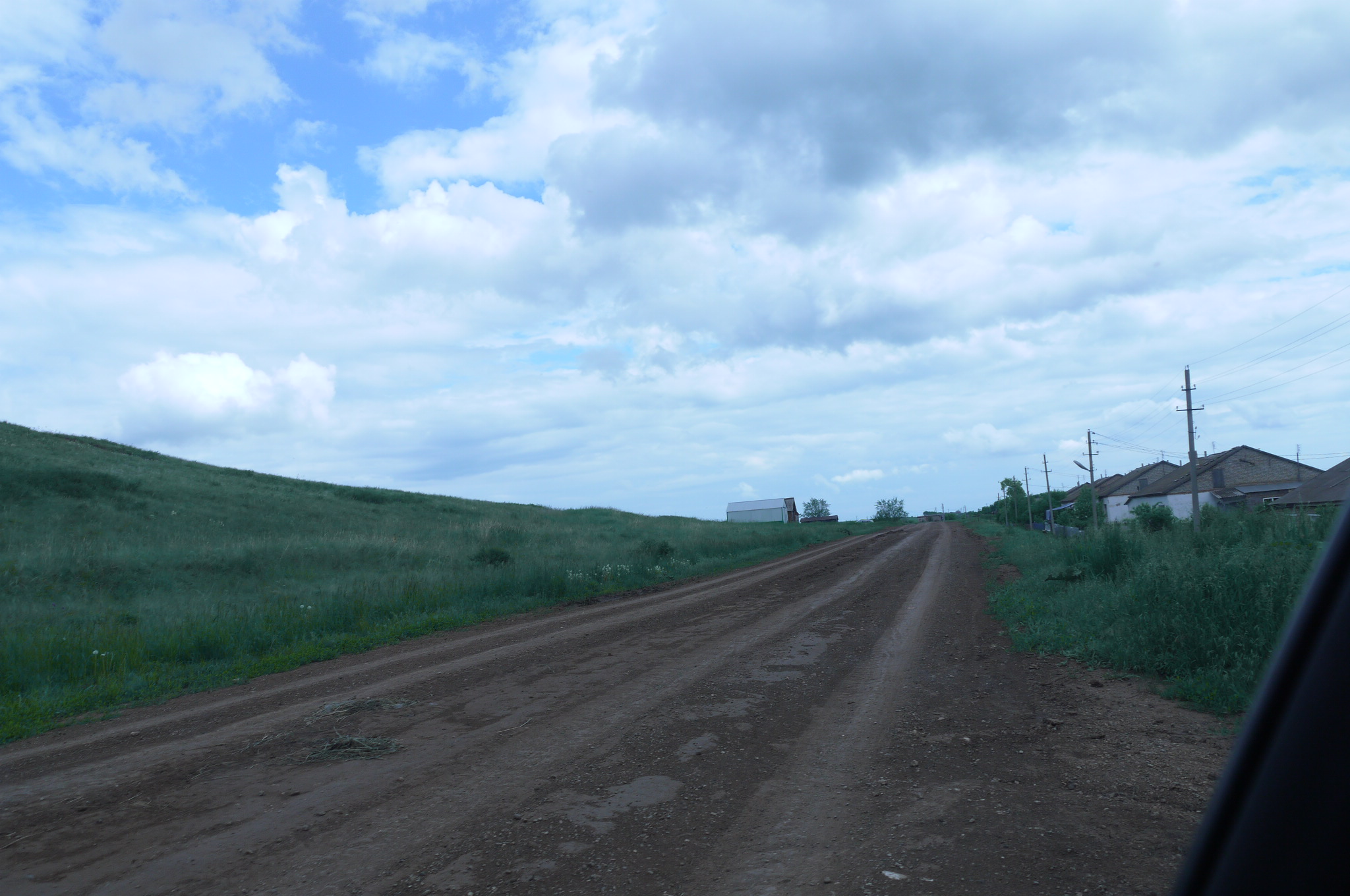
- A street in Krasnogvardeysky District

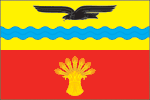
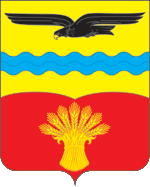
- Flag Coat of arms
- Location of Krasnogvardeysky District in Orenburg Oblast
- Coordinates: 52°51′04″N 53°28′48″E
- Country: Russia
- Federal subject: Orenburg Oblast
- Established: 1966
- Administrative center: Pleshanovo

Area
  - Total: 2,800 km^{2} (1,100 sq mi)

Population (2010 Census)
  - Total: 21,097
  - Density: 7.5/km^{2} (20/sq mi)
  - Urban: 0%
  - Rural: 100%

Administrative structure
  - Administrative divisions: 16 Selsoviets
  - Inhabited localities: 59 rural localities

Municipal structure
  - Municipally incorporated as: Krasnogvardeysky Municipal District
  - Municipal divisions: 0 urban settlements, 15 rural settlements
- Time zone: UTC+5 (MSK+2)
- OKTMO ID: 53623000
- Website: http://mo-ko.orb.ru/

Krasnogvardeysky District (Russian: Красногварде́йский райо́н) is an administrative and municipal district (raion), one of the thirty-five in Orenburg Oblast, Russia. It is located in the northwest of the oblast. The area of the district is 2,800 square kilometers (1,100 sq mi). Its administrative center is the rural locality (a selo) of Pleshanovo. Population: 21,097 (2010 Census). The population of Pleshanovo accounts for 16.5% of the district's total population.

== Demographics ==
Population: 21,097 (2010 Census); 25,451 (2002 census); 27,776 (1989 Soviet census).

The ethnic composition of the population is as follows:

- Russians: 54.0%
- Bashkirs: 25.7%
- Tatars: 6.8%
- Germans: 4.3%
- Ukrainians: 4.1%

== Notable people ==
- Gabdulla Amantay was a Bashkir poet, writer and playwright. The village where he was born, is in that area today.
