= Yelpachikha =

Yelpachikha Елпачиха
- Selo
- Location within Perm Krai Location within Russia
- Coordinates: 57°05′N 55°31′E
- Country: Russia
- Region: Perm Krai
- District: Bardymsky District
- Time zone: UTC+5:00

Yelpachikha (Russian: Елпачиха) is a rural locality (a selo) and the administrative center of Yelpachikhinskoye Rural Settlement, Bardymsky District, Perm Krai, Russia. The population was 1,341 as of 2010. There are 27 streets.

== Geography ==
Yelpachikha is located 19 km north of Barda (the district's administrative centre) by road. Konyukovo is the nearest rural locality.
