= Pleshanovo, Vologda Oblast =

Pleshanovo Плешаново
- Village
- Location within Vologda Oblast Location within Russia
- Coordinates: 59°11′N 37°31′E
- Country: Russia
- Region: Vologda Oblast
- District: Cherepovetsky District
- Time zone: UTC+3:00

Pleshanovo (Russian: Плешаново) is a rural locality (a village) in Nelazskoye Rural Settlement, Cherepovetsky District, Vologda Oblast, Russia. The population was 3 as of 2002. There are 9 streets.

== Geography ==
Pleshanovo is located 35 km (22 mi) northwest of Cherepovets (the district's administrative centre) by road. Soyvolovskaya is the nearest rural locality.
