= Pleshanovo, Orenburg Oblast =

Rural locality in Orenburg Oblast, Russia

Coordinates: 52°50′51″N 53°29′08″E

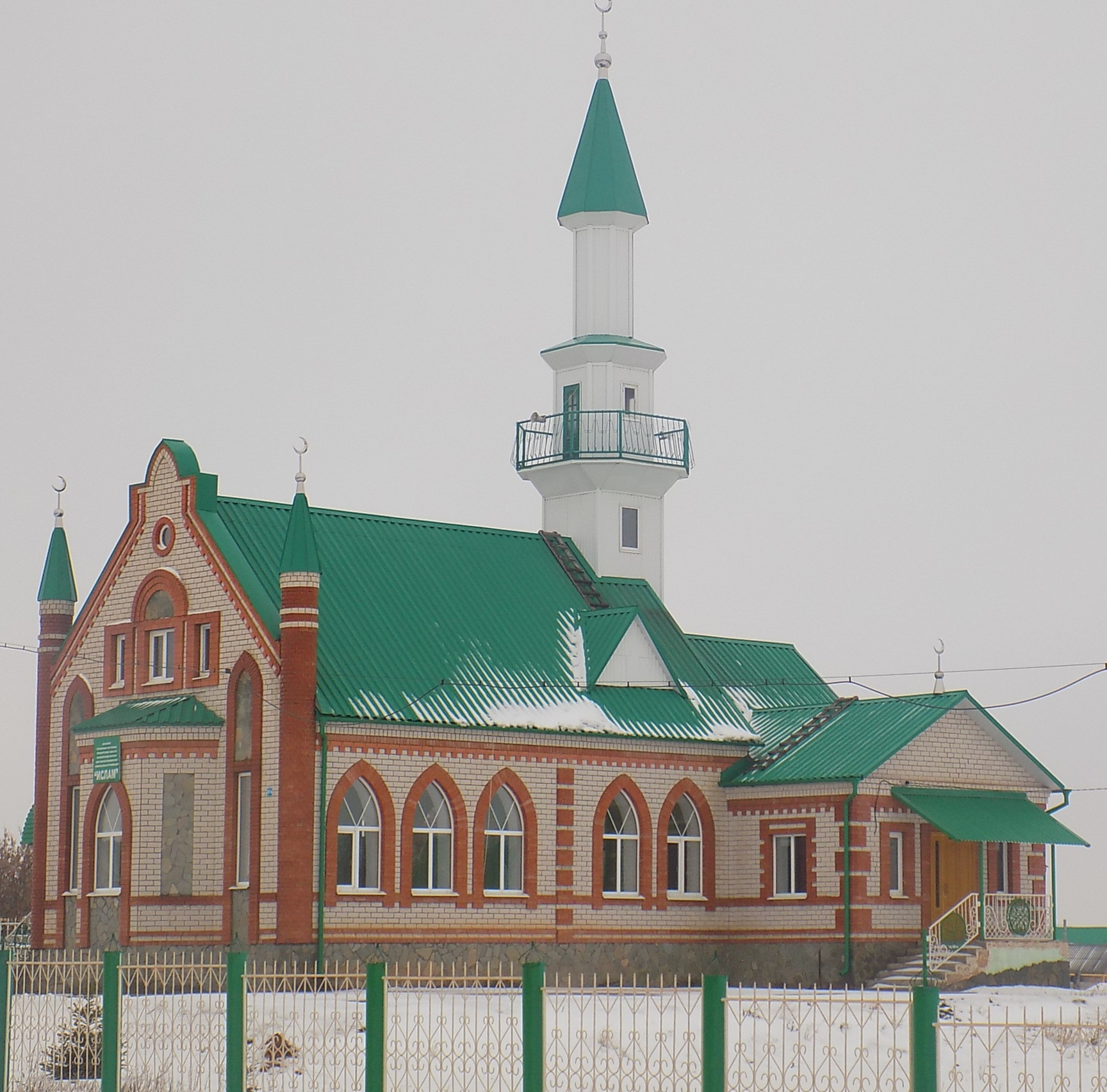
Mosque in Pleshanovo.

Pleshanovo (Russian: Плешаново) is a rural locality (a selo) and the administrative center of Krasnogvardeysky District, Orenburg Oblast, Russia. Population: 3,486 (2010 census); 3,767 (2002 census); 4,135 (1989 Soviet census).
