= Orsky Uyezd =

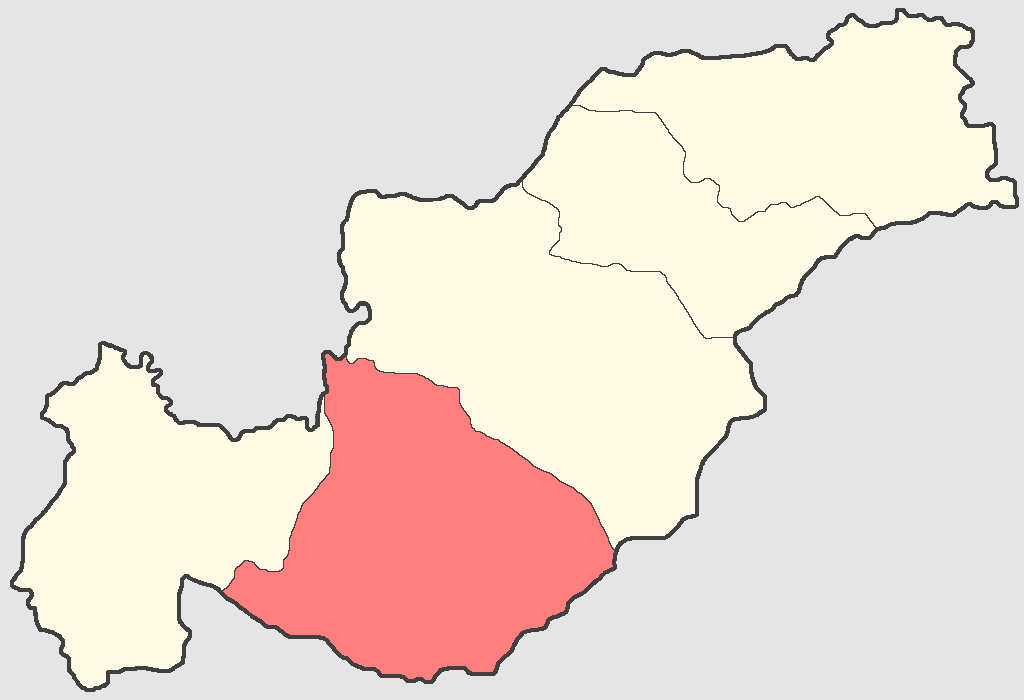
Orsk County on the map of Orenburg Governorate

Orsky Uyezd (Орский уезд) was one of the subdivisions of the Orenburg Governorate of the Russian Empire. It was situated in the southern part of the governorate. Its administrative centre was Orsk.

== Demographics ==
At the time of the Russian Empire Census of 1897, Orsky Uyezd had a population of 206,944. Of these, 42.8% spoke Bashkir, 40.1% Russian, 6.8% Tatar, 4.3% Ukrainian, 3.7% Mordvin, 1.0% Chuvash, 0.8% Belarusian, 0.2% Kazakh and 0.1% Kalmyk as their native language.
