= Orenburg Caravanserai =

Coordinates: 51.7714°N 55.0934°E

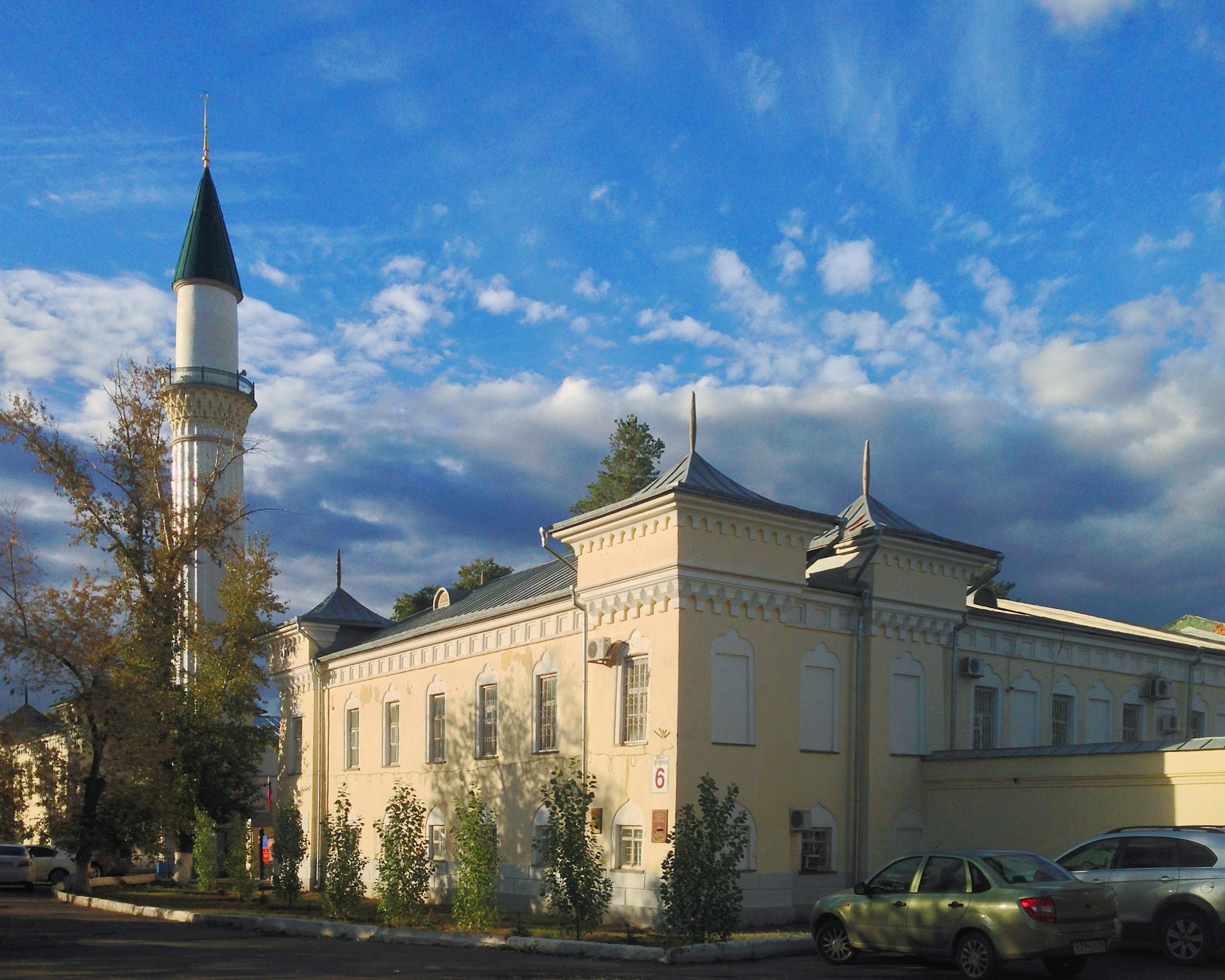
- Interactive map of Orenburg Caravanserai
- Location: 6 Park Avenue, Orenburg; Orenburg Oblast,460000
- Built: 1837-1844
- Architect: Alexander Brullov
- Architectural style: Islamic architecture
- Governing body: The Orenburg Oblast Government

The Orenburg Caravanserai (Bashkir: Каруанһарай) is a mosque, historical and architectural complex in Orenburg. It is a cultural monument of the Bashkir people. The caravanserai was built in 1837–1846 with donations as a place for the Office of the Bashkir-mesheryak army commander, hotels for Bashkirs who came to Orenburg for services and a workshop and school. The historical and architectural complex consists of Bashkir folk houses and mosques. The original design of architect Alexander Brullov was a pastiche of a traditional Bashkir village: the central dominant octagonal mosque reproduced the form of a Bashkir yurt.

The building housed the Orenburg Bashkir Pedagogical College from 1920 to 1924.

== Construction ==
The history of the Orenburg caravanserai began decades before its construction. Bashkirs had repeatedly appealed to the tsarist authorities for permission to build in Orenburg - then the administrative center of the Bashkir land - a building where their children could acquire knowledge and develop skills. At the insistence of the people of the canton chiefs gathering on his foreman instructed Canton Kagarmanov Kuvatova to obtain St. Petersburg building permits for the Orenburg Bashkir caravanserai. After several years Kuvatov received this permission from Emperor Nicholas I.

With the active participation of the Bashkirs, fixed assets were collected and construction began on the complex. Bashkirs produced building materials, transported them and carried out all other construction activities. In some periods more than one thousand Bashkirs with horses were involved. The magazine Russkaya Starina ("Russian Antiquity") in 1896 said that all the buildings were made Bashkirs appointed regiment and cantons: "Required for buildings wood floated down the river from Bashkiria SAKMAR Bashkirs same. Limestone and also produces them in 20 miles from Orenburg to Grebenskaya mountain."

The caravanserai was surrounded by a park on all sides, an area of more than five hectares. Creation of the park was conceived in conjunction with the design and construction of the buildings and carried out in the early 1850s. All planting material for the park came from the forests of Sterlitamaksky County and other places in Bashkortostan. Perennial trees were delivered in huge tubs to Orenburg from a hundred kilometers around or more.

Completion of the main body of the caravanserai dates to 1842. Rooms on the upper floor that were completed earlier by December 1841 housed the Chancellery of Bashkir-mesheryak army commander. Construction of the mosque and the minaret was completed in 1842 (according to other sources - in 1844). The interior of the mosque and minaret exterior cladding tiles took a long time.

The construction cost as of February 1845 was 84,295 rubles. silver or 295,034 rubles. banknotes. Construction was allocated mainly from Bashkir public treasury - 71,564 rubles. silver (250,474 rubles. banknotes). More than 30,000 rubles of banknotes were collected by Bashkir villages.

Celebrations to mark the opening of the caravanserai were timed to the birthday of Nicholas I of Russia and took place August 30, 1846. Bashkirs gathered for the celebrations from all corners of Bashkortostan. A grand celebration was organized with refreshments, and traditional Bashkir horse racing. A public service was held in the mosque (mullah Gataulla Altynguzin), attended by about 3.5 thousand parishioners.

== See also ==
- Islam in Russia
- List of mosques in Russia
- List of mosques in Europe
