= Provisional Siberian Government (Omsk) =

Short-lived government in Russian Civil War

Provisional Siberian Government Врeменное Сиби́рское прави́тельство (Russian)
- 1918
- Flag

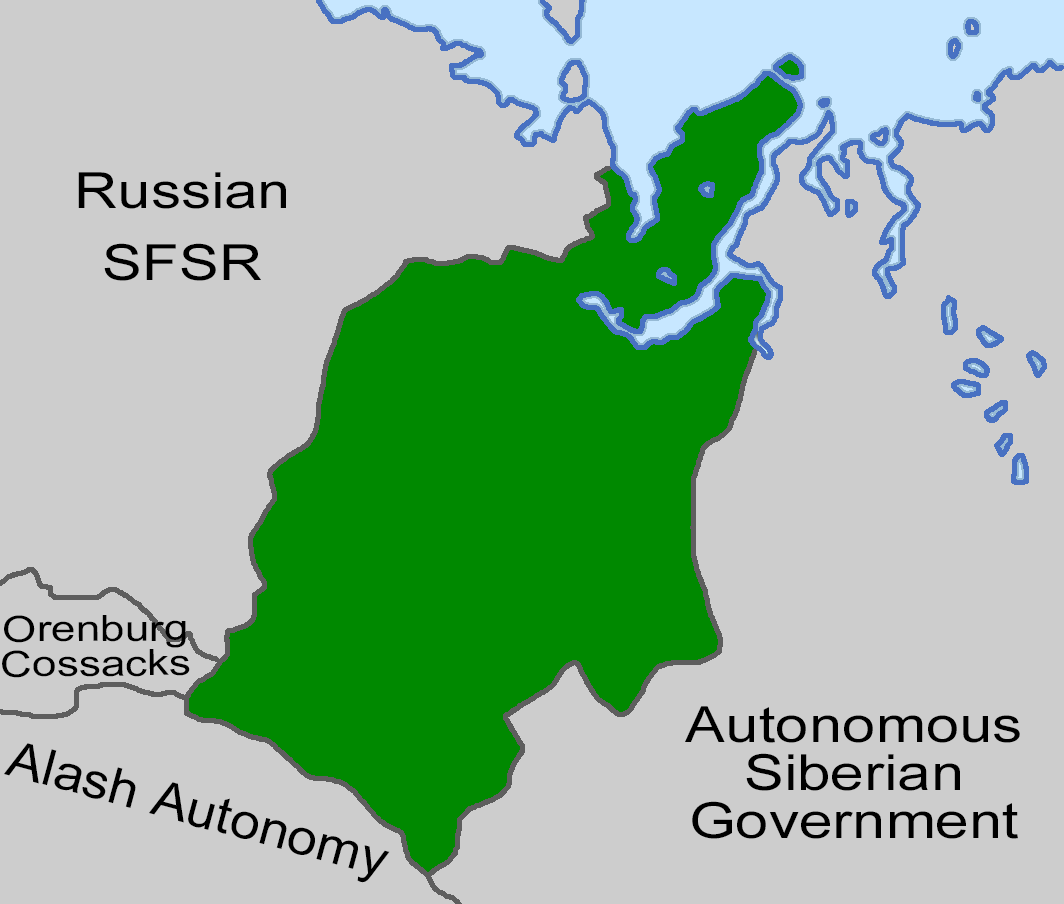
- Territory controlled by the provisional government
- Status: Provisional Government
- Capital: Omsk
- Common languages: Russian
- Legislature: Siberian Regional Duma
- Historical era: Russian Civil War
  - Established: June 30, 1918
  - Dissolved: November 3, 1918
Preceded by	Succeeded by
Russian Soviet Republic	Russian State

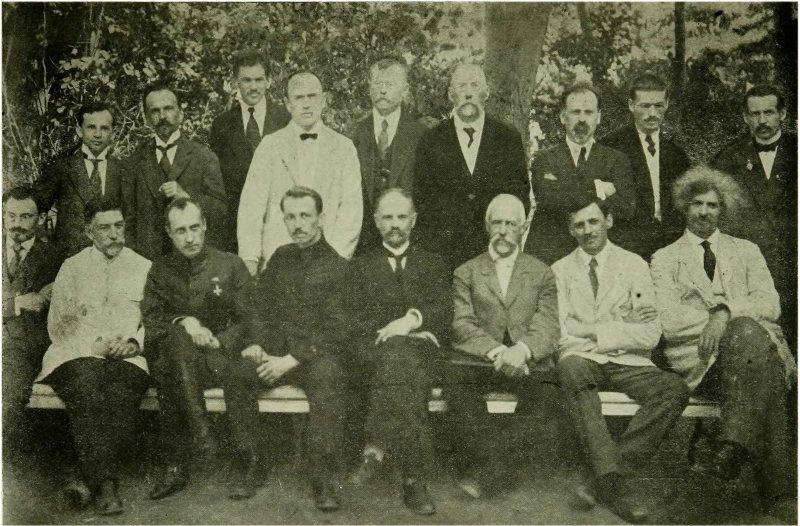
Members of Provisional Siberian Government

The Provisional Siberian Government (Russian: Вре́менное Сиби́рское прави́тельство, PSG) was a temporary body of state administration of the regions of Siberia. In the summer of 1918, as a result of the uprising of the Czechoslovak Legion, Soviet power in Siberia was overthrown. On 23 September, 1918, at the state Conference in Ufa, the Provisional All-Russian Government was formed. It was an unstable alliance, with many compromises of various anti-Soviet forces in Siberia, and it was disbanded two months later after Admiral Alexander Kolchak took power in a coup.

== History ==
In March 1918, as a result of the Soviet takeover in Siberia, the chairman of the Provisional Siberian Government Pyotr Yakovlevich Derber, together with a group of his government, moved to Harbin, then in June to Vladivostok. Before leaving, Derber formed the West Siberian Commissariat of four people to represent the Bolshevik controlled Siberian territory. Mikhail Yakovlevich Lindberg, Boris Dmitrievich Markov, Pavel Yakovlevich Mikhailov and V. O. Sidorov. All of them were members of the Socialist Revolutionary Party.

The uprising of the Czechoslovak Legion in the spring of 1918 marked the beginning of Siberia falling back to into the White Movement. On June 6, 1918, Omsk was retaken by the White Army. Colonel Pavel Pavlovich Ivanov-Rinov's first ordered in his newly formed Omsk commandant's officer announced that "from this date on, all plenitude of power belongs to me and the authorized representative of the Provisional Siberian Government A. A. Kuzentsov until the transfer of power to the semstvo and city public administrations."

Negotiations were held in Omsk throughout June, as a result of which on June 30, 1918, the creation of a new Council of Ministers was announced, which later began to call itself the Provisional Siberian Government. Its chairman was the Minister of Foreign Relations Pyotr Vologodsky. In addition to Vologodsky, the Council of Ministers included the Minister of Internal Affairs Vladimir Krutovsky, the Minister of Native Affairs Mikhail Shatilov, the Minister of Finance Ivan Mikhailov, and the Minister of Justice Grigory Patushinsky.

The Derber government did not want to recognize the result of this coup. On June 29 a meeting was held in Vladivostok, at which it was announced that it would be renamed to the Provisional Government of Autonomous Siberia. A few days later, the government in Omsk and Vladivostok exchanged mutually exclusive statements. First, the Omsk government declared that "from now on, no other authority besides the Provisional Siberian Government can act on the territory of Siberia or undertake obligations on it behalf." A few days later, on August 8, 1918, the Vladivostok Government published the "Declaration of the Provisional Government of Autonomous Siberia", where it "informs the powers friendly to Russia, both aligned and neutral, that on June 29, 1918, it assumed the rights and duties of the central state authority of Siberia."

Apart from the adoption of declarations, military power and support with the Omsk government. Derber himself, soon after the adoption of the "Declaration of the Provisional Government of Autonomous Siberia", resigned all powers of his government and left Vladivostok. His successor as chairman of the government was the Socialist Revolutionary Ivan Lavrov. In October 1918, the government dissolved itself, recognizing the authority of the Provisional All-Russian Government.

== Government activities ==
The newly formed government in Omsk began to fight for recognition as the only legitimate government in Russia and the basis of the future all-Russian government. On July 4, 1918, the Provisional Siberian Government adopted a declaration "On the state independence of Siberia".

On July 24, Krutovsky left for Krasnoyarsk on official business and effectively withdrew from work in the Council of Ministers. On July 26, Serebrennikov arrived in Omsk from Irkutsk, which had been liberated from the Bolsheviks, and took up the post of Minister of Supplies the following day. At the end of August, Vologodsky, who was feeling unwell, was given a two-month vacation. As a result of changes in the personal composition of the Council of Ministers, Gins managed to pass a regulation on the creation of an Administrative Council. Due to the fact that most members of the Provisional Siberian Government left for Ufa at the beginning of September to participate in the work of the State Conference, this council, which began work on September 7, 1918, effectively began to decide all matters formally related to the competence of the government, up to and including the introduction of government bills to the Siberian Regional Duma. During the short period of its sole control over Siberia, the Administrative Council had a serious influence on the White Movement.

The transfer of power to the Provisional All-Russian Government was signed on November 3, 1918, in Omsk. Every minister signed it. 15 days later Admiral Alexander Kolchak couped the Provisional Government; being declared Supreme Ruler of Russia.

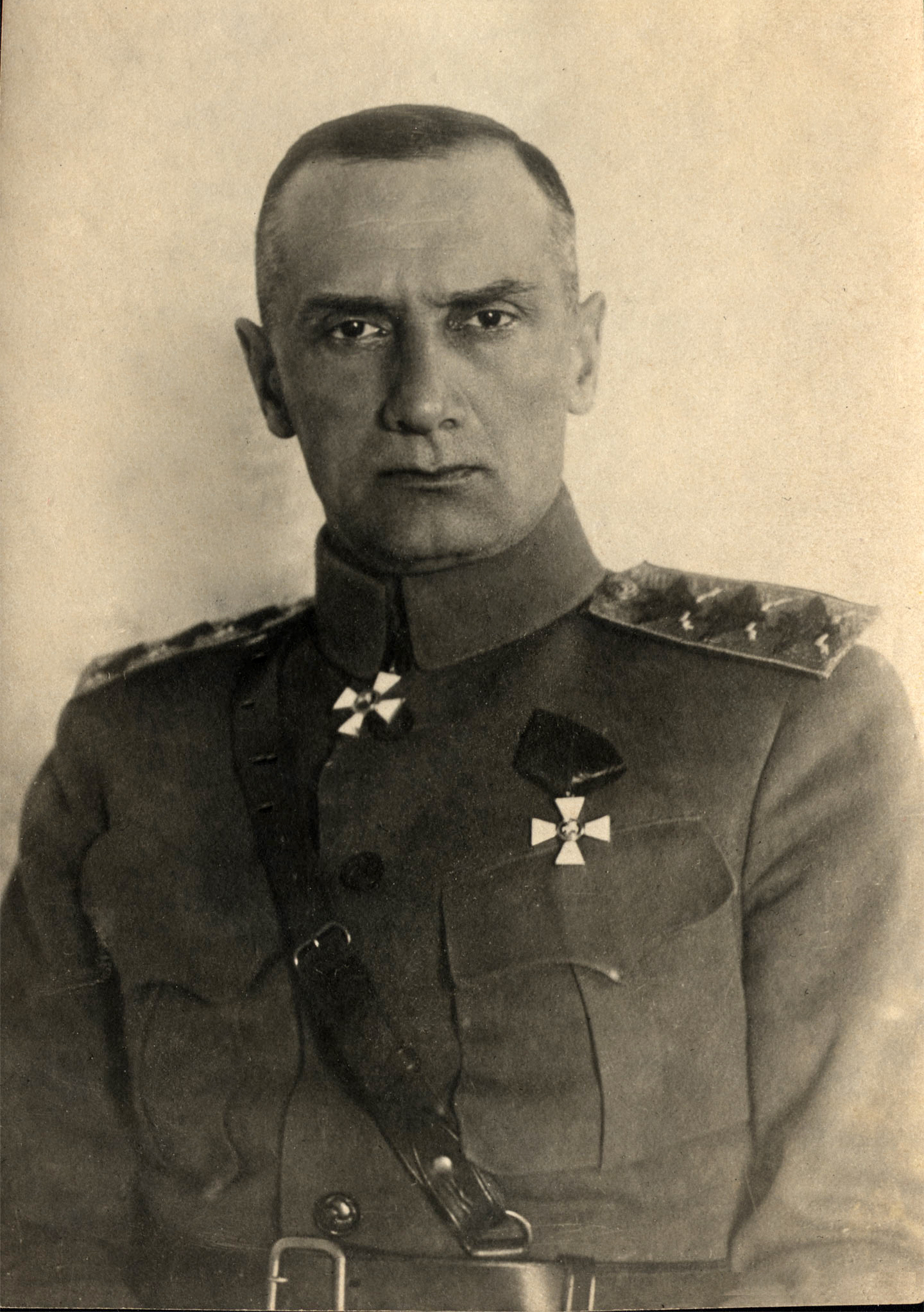
Alexander Kolchak as Supreme Ruler of Russia

== See also ==
- Siberian Republic (1918)

== Additional reading ==
- "Гражданская война в России: катастрофа Белого движения в Сибири" ("Civil War in Russia: Catastrophe of White Movement in Siberia") - Moscow, "AST" Publishing House, 2005. ISBN 5-17-025035-5
