= Orenburgsky Uyezd =

Orenburgsky Uyezd (Оренбургский уезд) was one of the subdivisions of the Orenburg Governorate of the Russian Empire. It was situated in the southwestern part of the governorate. Its administrative centre was Orenburg.

== Demographics ==
At the time of the Russian Empire Census of 1897, Orenburgsky Uyezd had a population of 555,653. Of these, 68.4% spoke Russian, 10.2% Bashkir, 9.1% Tatar, 5.4% Ukrainian, 4.7% Mordvin, 0.9% German, 0.5% Chuvash, 0.2% Yiddish, 0.2% Kazakh and 0.1% Polish as their native language.
