= Temyasovo =

Temyasovo Темясово
- Selo
- Location within Bashkortostan Location within Russia
- Coordinates: 52°59′N 58°07′E
- Country: Russia
- Region: Bashkortostan
- District: Baymaksky District
- Time zone: UTC+5:00

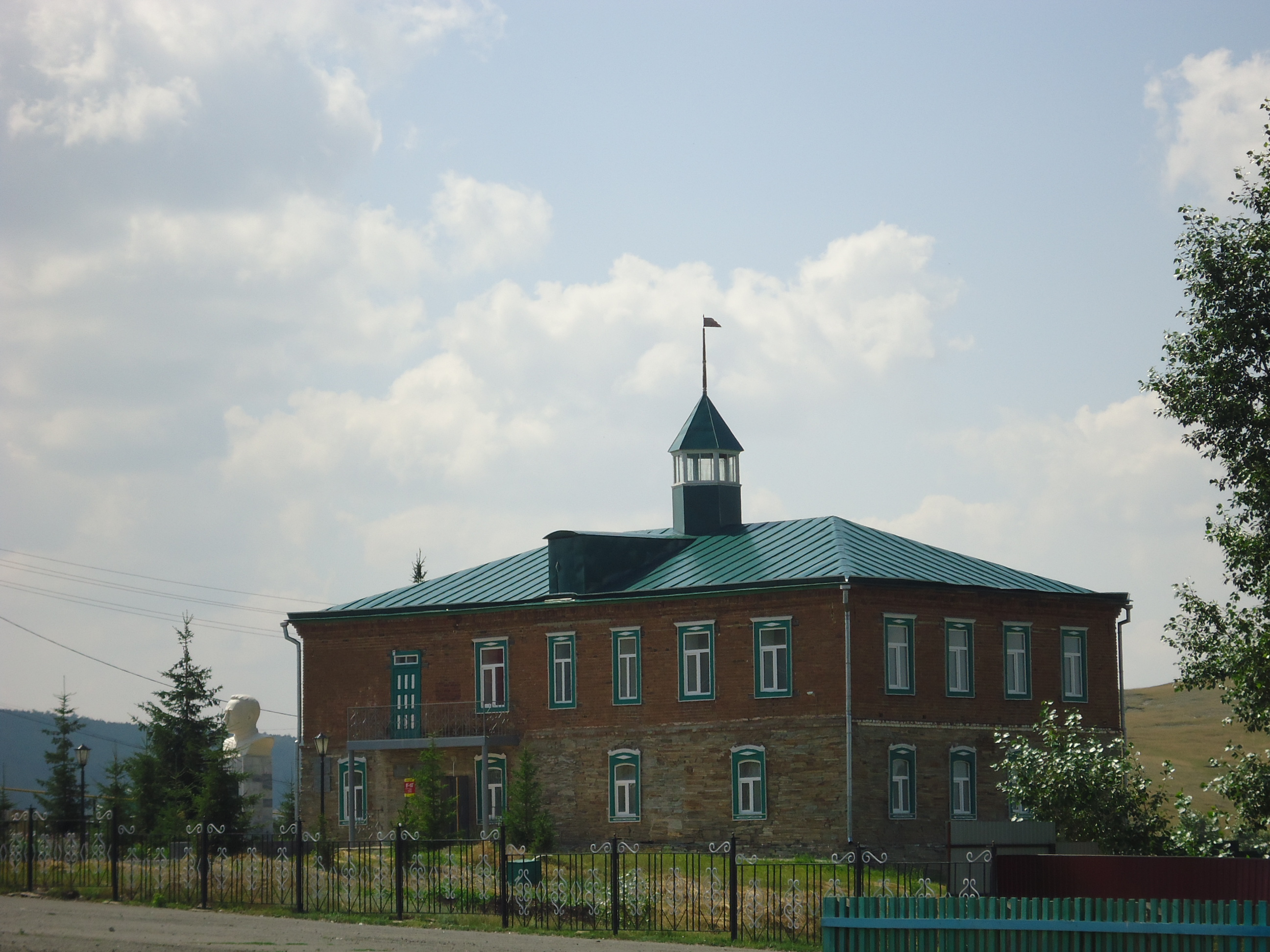
Temyasovsky Museum of Local Lore

Temyasovo (Russian: Темясово; Bashkir: Темәс, Temäs) is a rural locality (a selo) and the administrative centre of Temyasovsky Selsoviet, Baymaksky District, Bashkortostan, Russia. The population was 3,529 as of 2010. There are 46 streets.

== Geography ==
Temyasovo is located 55 km north of Baymak (the district's administrative centre) by road. Verkhneidrisovo is the nearest rural locality.
