= Provisional Siberian Government (Vladivostok) =

Provisional government (1918)

Provisional Siberian Government Временное правительство автономной Сибири (Russian)
- 1918
- Flag of the Provisional Siberian Government "LONG LIVE AUTONOMOUS SIBERIA!"

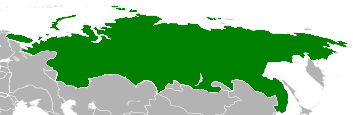
- Map of territory claimed by the Provisional Siberian Government in green
- Capital: Vladivostok
- Common languages: Russian
- Demonym: Siberians
- Government: Provisional Government
- Historical era: Russian Civil War
  - Established: January 1918
  - Dissolved: October 1918
Preceded by	Succeeded by
Russian Republic; Soviet Russia	Russian State

The Provisional Siberian Government (Russian: Вре́менное Сиби́рское прави́тельство, later the Provisional Government of Autonomous Siberia), was an ephemeral government for Siberia created by the White movement.

== History ==
=== Background ===
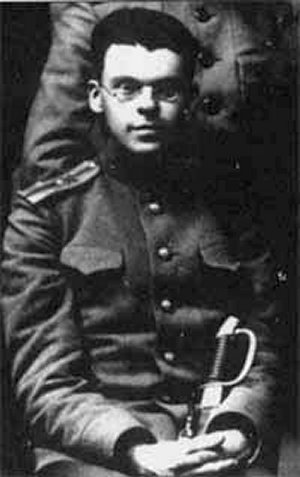
Arkady Krakovetsky in the uniform of a lieutenant. All-Russian Congress of Officers' Revolutionary Organizations, December 1906

The seizure of power by the Bolshevik Party in Petrograd in the Russian Revolution of November 1917 was followed by the dispersal of the Russian Constituent Assembly early in the morning of January 19, 1918 (N.S.), a body which had been dominated by the elected representatives of the Party of Socialists-Revolutionaries (PSR), directed by Victor Chernov. This usurpation of authority by the Council of People's Commissars and the 2nd All-Russian Congress of Soviets did not end opposition to the Bolshevik regime, however.

In December 1917 elections were held to select a Siberian Regional Duma which was to be convened in the city of Tomsk. Owing to the revolutionary temper of the times, the middle class and the bourgeoisie had been excluded from the elections to this body, a decision which was denounced by the centrist Constitutional Democratic Party (known as the K-D, or Kadets). Additionally the Bolsheviks considered the Siberian effort as an attempt to reduce the sovereignty of their own regime and refused to participate with the elections to this Siberian Regional Duma or to recognize the body's legitimacy. With the Monarchist Right and the Center both effectively excluded, and the Bolshevik Left boycotting, the delegates elected to the Siberian regional parliament were dominated by members of Chernov's PSR.

After a delay necessitated by the inability to assemble a quorum of elected representatives, on the night of January 28/29, 1918, some forty delegates finally succeeded in gathering in Tomsk to perform their business. This body expeditiously elected a government known as the Provisional Siberian Government (PSG), with young Socialist-Revolutionary Pyotr Derber elected president. Of the PSG's twenty ministers, only six had been present at the founding meeting of January 28–29. Two had been in Bolshevik prison, and the rest were scattered throughout Siberia and north China and were chosen in absentia, without their prior consent. Soon afterward, Derber and many other PSG officials went to Vladivostok in the more secure Pacific region.

On 1 June 1918, after the Revolt of the Czechoslovak Legion, the formation of the West Siberian Commissariat was announced. According to William Henry Chamberlin,

"It derived its claim to authority from the Government, headed by a Socialist Revolutionary named Derber, which had been elected in February by the Siberian Regional Duma, a body which had been chosen on the basis of universal suffrage and which, like the Constituent Assembly, had been dispersed by the Bolsheviki."

Derber didn't agree with the formation of this new government, and during a meeting at Vladivostok his PSG was renamed as the Provisional Government of Autonomous Siberia (PGAS). PGAS and the new PSG didn't recognize each other and each claimed itself as the only government of Siberia, but Derber's government didn't have armed forces. Soon afterward, Derber resigned and left Vladivostok; his successor was I.A.Lavrov of the Socialist-Revolutionary Party.

In September 1918, Pyotr Vologodsky, representing the Provisional All-Russian Government, traveled to Eastern Siberia according to Chamberlin, "...and obtained the abdication of the phantom Derber Cabinet in Vladivostok."

== Other sources consulted ==
- The Russian Civil War by Evan Mawdsley (2008) Edinburgh, Birlinn pp 143–8
- Kommersant: Primorye (Maritime) Territory
