= Bashkir Autonomous Soviet Socialist Republic =

Autonomous republic of the Russian SFSR (1919–1990)

Bashkir Autonomous Soviet Socialist Republic Башҡорт Автономиялы Совет Социалистик Республикаhы (Bashkir) Башкирская Автономная Советская Социалистическая Республика (Башкирия) (Russian)
- ASSR of the Russian SFSR
- 1919–1990
- Flag (1954–1992) Emblem (1978–1992)

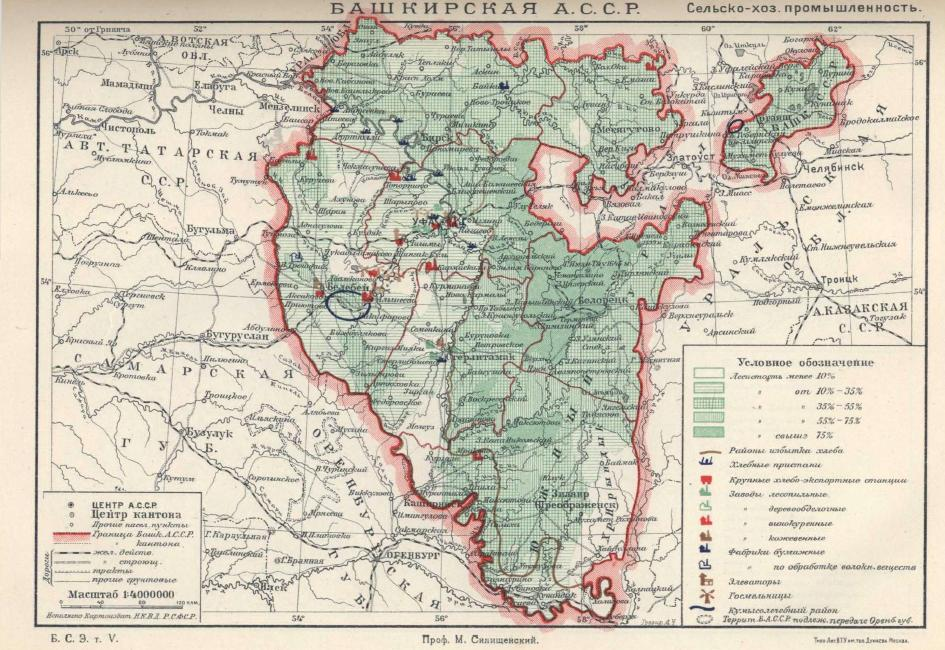
- Map of the Bashkir ASSR in 1927
- Capital: Temyasovo (1919—1920); Sterlitamak (1920—1922); Ufa (from 1922)
- Area
  - 1990: 143,600 km^{2} (55,400 sq mi)
- Population
  - 1989: 3,943,100
  - Type: Autonomous Soviet Socialist Republic
- History
  - Established: 23 March 1919
  - Sovereignty declared: 11 October 1990
  - Renamed to the Republic of Bashkortostan: 25 February 1990
Preceded by	Succeeded by
Bashkiria	Bashkortostan
- Today part of: Russia

The Bashkir Autonomous Soviet Socialist Republic, (Note: Bashkir: Башҡорт Автономиялы Совет Социалистик Республикаhы, romanized: Başqort Autonomiyalı Sovet Sotsialistik Respublikahı; Russian: Башкирская Автономная Советская Социалистическая Республика или Башкирия, romanized: Bashkirskaya Avtonomnaya Sovetskaya Sotsialisticheskaya Respublika) also historically known as Soviet Bashkiria or simply Bashkiria, was an autonomous republic of the Russian SFSR. Currently it is known as Republic of Bashkortostan, a federal subject of Russia. The Bashkir ASSR was the first Autonomous Soviet Socialist Republic in the RSFSR.

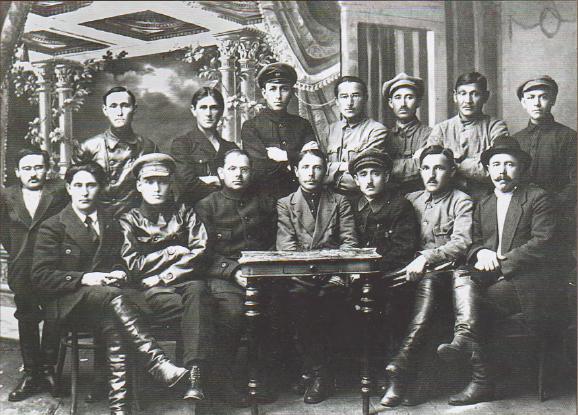
Members of the Bashkir government, 20 June 1920

The republic occupied an area of 143,600 km^{2} (55,400 sq mi) in the far south-eastern corner of European Russia, bounded on the east by the Ural Mountains and within seventy kilometers of the Kazakhstan border at its southernmost point. The region was settled by nomads of the steppe, the Turkic Bashkirs, during the 13th-century domination by the Golden Horde. Russians arrived in the mid-16th century, founding the city of Ufa, now the republic's capital. Numerous local uprisings broke out in opposition to the settlement of larger Russian populations in the centuries that followed. The Bashkirs finally gave up nomadic life in the 19th century, adopting the agricultural lifestyle that remains their primary means of support. The traditional clan-based social structure has largely disappeared. The predominant religions of the Bashkir population are Muslim, which is observed by the majority, and Russian Orthodoxy. A major battleground of the Russian Civil War, in 1919 the Bashkir Republic was the first ethnic region to be designated an autonomous republic of Russia under the new communist government. The republic declared its sovereignty within the Soviet Union on 11 October 1990 as the Bashkir Soviet Socialist Republic, and in 1992 it declared full independence. Two years later, Bashkortostan agreed to remain within the legislative framework of the Russian Federation, provided that mutual areas of competence were agreed upon.

The republic has rich mineral resources, especially petroleum, natural gas, iron ore, manganese, copper, salt, and construction stone. The Soviet government built a variety of heavy industries on that resource base. The traditional Bashkir occupations of livestock raising and beekeeping remain important economic activities.

== See also ==
- Bashkir Regional Committee of the Communist Party of the Soviet Union
