= Siberian regionalism =

Autonomist movement in Russian Siberia

Siberian regionalism Сибирское областничество
- Founder: Grigory Potanin
- Founded: in the end of 1850s
- Legalized: in the October of 1905
- Dissolved: 1923 (in Siberia); 1935 (in exile)
- Headquarters: Tomsk
- Newspaper: Vostochnoe obozrenie Sibirskaya zhizn'
- Ideology: Regionalism: • autonomism (majority) • separatism (minority); Subsidiarity; Home rule (in 1905–1917); Federalism (since 1917); Revolutionary democracy (in 1860s); Narodnism (in 19th c.); Anti-communism; Big tent: • Liberalism (right wing) • Democratic socialism (left wing)
- Political position: Centre
- Religion: Secularism
- National affiliation: Russian Empire (Russia) Russian Republic; Siberian Republic (Russia) Russian State
- Regional affiliation: Siberia
- Slogan: "Through Autonomous Siberia to the Revival of Free Russia" (in 1918)

Siberian regionalism (Russian: Сибирское областничество, romanized: Sibirskoye oblastnichestvo, lit. 'Siberian oblast movement') was a political movement that advocated for the formation of an autonomous Siberian state in North Asia. The idea originated in the mid-19th century and reached a high tide with the White movement military activities of Aleksandr Kolchak (1874–1920) and Viktor Pepelyayev (1885–1920) during the Russian Civil War of 1917–1922.

Those who support Siberian regionalism can be called both Siberian Regionalists, Oblastniks, or Oblastniki.

== Foundations ==
=== Regionalism and autonomy ===
According to Susan Smith-Peter, Siberian regionalism in Imperial Russia was the first political regionalist movement in a European country. Following the activities of Afanasy Shchapov (1830–1876) in Siberia, a movement advocating a far-ranging autonomy for the region took shape under the name of "regionalism" (oblastnichestvo). In the 19th century Siberian students in Saint Petersburg: Grigory Potanin (1835–1920), Nikolay Yadrintsev (1842–1894) and people with other backgrounds founded the movement.

=== Independence ===
Some radical members in 1863 presumably prepared a revolt in Siberia together with exiled Poles and Ukrainians, trying to achieve independence and to begin the development of a Siberian state, similar to the United States. Tsarist authorities arrested and imprisoned forty-four members of the group in May 1865, after watch-officers of the Siberian Cadet Corps searched cadet Arseny Samsonov, aged 16, for illicit items and found a proclamation entitled "To Patriots of Siberia", attributed to a collective authorship of Grigory Potanin, Nikolay Yadrintsev, Serafim Serafimovich Shashkov (1841–1882), et al.

The Russian revolutionary Mikhail Bakunin (1814–1876) supported the idea of an autonomous Siberia in the hope it would become a democratic state, prosperous within a union with United States and leading to the collapse of Imperial Russia. Local thinkers and settlers saw Siberia as means of escape from the oppression of the Russian Empire, and as the seed of a possible free and democratic country that would spread freedom across Asia.

In the end of the 19th and at beginning of the 20th century, Siberian regionalists led by Potanin and Yadrintsev formed a legal opposition to Russian colonialism in Siberia; they wrote many books and articles, and organized research into Siberian cultures, economics, ethnicities, races, etc. Yadrintsev's greatest book, Siberia as a colony (Сибирь как колония), envisaged the future of Siberia as domination of the white race and a European way of development, similar to the U.S., claiming that the Siberians already had many differences from their Russian and East-Slavic ancestors — especially cultural differences such as love of freedom and private initiative.

== Provisional Government of Autonomous Siberia ==
After the February Revolution, the development of oblastnichestvo gained momentum, as on May 21, 1917, when the Oblastniks convened their first general meeting in Irkutsk, where they heard and discussed the report delivered by I.I. Serebrennikov "On the autonomy of Siberia". In August, the Oblastniks convened the Conference of Public Organizations based on the decision of Tomsk Provincial People's Assembly as of May 18, 1917. On August 5, 1917, the Conference approved "The Regulations for the Autonomy of Siberia" and heard the report by P.A. Kazantsev "On the Siberian National Banner", which it also unanimously approved:

The National Siberian Banner shall be a combination of two colours: white and green. White colour means Siberian snow, whilst green colour – Siberian taiga. The banner shall be rectangular, split into two parts diagonally from the left top to right bottom. thus, the upper triangle shall be of green colour, and the lower one – of white colour.

On January 28, 1918, the Siberian Regional Duma was convened in Tomsk in secret, fearing suppression by the Bolsheviks, who occupied the city. The members elected the members of the Provisional Government of Autonomous Siberia from four political factions:

1. The Socialist-Revolutionary Party delegated:
  - P.Ya. Derber to be the Chairman of the Government,
  - Colonel A.A. Krakovetsky to take the Ministry of Defence,
  - A.Ye. Novosyolov – Minister of Internal Affairs,
  - N.Ye. Zhernakov – State Controller,
  - Ye.V. Zakharov, S.A. Kudryavtsev and M.B. Shatilov to be ministers with no charge.
2. The Oblastniks delegated:
  - P.V. Vologodsky to become the Minister of Foreign Affairs,
  - V.M. Krutovsky – Minister of Public Health,
  - G.B. Patushinsky – Minister of Justice,
  - I.I. Serebrennikov – Minister of Supply and Food,
  - I.A. Mikhailov – Minister of Finance,
  - L.A. Ustrugov – Minister of Railways.
3. The ethnic minorities delegated:
  - V.T. Tiber-Petrov to take the position of the Minister of Native Affairs,
  - D.G. Sulima – Minister of Exterritorial Peoples,
  - E.D. Rinchino – Minister of Public Education,
  - G.S. Neometullov to be a minister with no charge.
4. Mensheviks delegated:
  - M.A. Kolobov to become the Minister of Trade and Industry
  - I.S. Yudin to become the Minister of Labour.

Only a handful of them agreed to take part in the Government. Fairly soon, most of the ministers had to flee to the Far East and stayed there until July, when they went to Vladivostok after it was liberated from the Bolsheviks by the Czechs.

Meanwhile, on May 27, 1918, Colonel A.N. Grishin-Almazov, who undertook his best efforts to unite the officer resistance against the Bolsheviks, ordered a full scale uprising, which proved to be a total success, as the Whites managed to defeat the Reds and cleared many Siberian cities of their presence. On June 13, 1918, colonel A.N. Grishin-Almazov issued an order to form the West Siberian Army (later to become Siberian Army). In a matter of months, he managed to accumulate over 10,000 volunteers across Siberia and Urals, which allowed some of the Siberian ministers headed by P.V. Vologodsky to come back.

== Provisional Siberian Government ==
On June 23, 1918, Vologodsky formed a new Provisional Siberian Government instead of the previously elected Government of Autonomous Siberia, which had virtually no influence and authority whatsoever. He took the chair and ministry of foreign affairs assisted by many of his former member ministers I.I. Serebrennikov, who again became the Minister of Supply, while I.A. Mikhailov was chosen to be the Minister of Finance and M.B. Shatilov – the Minister of Native Affairs. Colonel A.N. Grishin-Almazov was appointed Minister of Defence.

Under the control of the regionalists, there was a short-term state formation, so-called "Siberian Republic". On July 11, 1918, the Provisional Siberian Government published the Declaration, declaring its authority over territory of Siberia, and restoration of the Russian state as the ultimate goal of the Siberian government. Decision on the status of Siberia was left to the future All-Russian and Siberian constituent assemblies.

On November 3, 1918, the Provisional Siberian Government merged with the Ufa Directory, forming a Provisional All-Russian Government.

== Modern movements ==
In 2014, an artist, Artyom Loskutov, wrote in his blog about an idea to create a Siberian Republic within the Russian Federation and attempted to organize a mock demonstration called Monstration for Siberian federalisation to take place on August 17 in Novosibirsk. Russian authorities banned the march and attempted to censor media coverage about the event, citing a recently passed law against "calls to mass unrest, extremist activities or participation in illegal public events." Loskutov denies accusation of separatism. The purpose of the protest was to "ridicule the Kremlin's claimed hypocrisy in the annexation of Crimea by the Russian Federation and to raise the issue of Siberia's delayed development". He claimed that Western Siberia provides most of Russia's oil and gas, but the region gets very little benefit since the taxes go to Moscow.

The Sibir Battalion, a unit in the Ukrainian International Legion, formed during the Russian invasion of Ukraine and claims to be fighting for the independence of minorities in Siberia, namely Yakuts and Buryats. The unit uses the flag of the 1918 provisional government.

== See also ==
- Autonomous administrative divisions of Russia
- List of active separatist movements in Asia
- Siberians
- Indigenous peoples of Siberia
- Russian Far East
- Far North (Russia)
- Kolyma
- List of Russian explorers
- Far Eastern Republic
- Primorskaya Oblast

== Bibliography ==
- Anisimova, Alla; Echevskaia, Olga (2016). "Reading Post-Soviet (Trans)formations of Siberian Identity through Biographical Narrative," REGION: Regional Studies of Russia, Eastern Europe, and Central Asia 5, no. 2. pp. 127–148.
- Anisimova, Alla; Echevskaya, Olga (2018). "Siberian regional identity: self-perception, solidarity, or political claim?". In Edith W. Clowes; Gisela Erbslöh; Ani Kokobobo (eds.). Russia's Regional Identities: The Power of the Provinces. Routledge Contemporary Russia and Eastern Europe Series. London; New York: Routledge. ISBN 978-1-138-20102-6.
- Balzer, M. M. (1999). The Tenacity of Ethnicity: A Siberian Saga in Global Perspective. Princeton University Press
- Curtis, K. (1985). The Soviet State: The Domestic Roots of Soviet Foreign Policy. Royal Institute of International Affairs.
- von Hagen, Mark (2007). "Federalisms and Pan-movements: Re-imagining Empire," in Russian Empire: Space, People, Power, ed. Jane Burbank, Mark von Hagen and Anatoli Remnev. Indiana University Press, 494–510.
- Hanson, Gary (1974) "Siberian Regionalism in the 1860s," Topic 27: 62–75.
- Kovalaschina, Elena (2007). "The Historical and Cultural Ideals of the Siberian Oblastnichestvo," Sibirica 6, no. 2: 87–119.
- von Mohrenschildt, Dimitri (1981). Toward a United States of Russia: Plans and Projects of Federal Reconstruction of Russia in the Nineteenth Century. Fairleigh Dickinson University Press.
- Smith-Peter, Susan (2018). "The Six Waves of Russian Regionalism in European Context, 1830–2000". In Edith W. Clowes; Gisela Erbslöh; Ani Kokobobo (eds.). Russia's Regional Identities: The Power of the Provinces. Routledge Contemporary Russia and Eastern Europe Series. London; New York: Routledge. pp. 14–43. ISBN 978-1-138-20102-6.
- Sushko, Valentina A. (June 2009). "Сибирский национализм и борьба за власть в крае (март 1917 — ноябрь 1918 г.)" [Siberian nationalism and the struggle for power in the region (March 1917 – November 1918)] (PDF). Вестник Томского государственного университета [ Tomsk State University Bulletin] (in Russian). 323: 174–179. ISSN 1561-7793.
- Tishkov, Valery (1997). Ethnicity, Nationalism and Conflict in and after the Soviet Union: The Mind Aflame. Sage Publications Ltd.
- Watrous, Stephen (1993). "The Regionalist Conception of Siberia, 1860 to 1920". In Galya Diment; Yuri Slezkine (eds.). Between Heaven and Hell: The Myth of Siberia in Russian Culture. New York: St. Martin's Press. pp. 113–132. ISBN 978-0-312-06072-5.
