= Siberian Republic =

Hypothetical state in Northern Asia

Siberian Federal District Geographic Russian Siberia Siberia according to the widest definition and in historical use

The Siberian Republic (Russian: Сибирская Республика, romanized: Sibirskaya Respublika) is the idea and belief of making Siberia an independent republican state, independent from the Russian Federation.

== Arguments ==
The argument for an independent republic is that Siberia makes up 77% of Russian territory (13.1 million square kilometers) which includes around 35% of its population (40 million people). Western Siberia has rich oil and gas reserves, but the taxes go directly to Moscow. Getting extraction companies to pay taxes in the regions where they operate would benefit Siberia.

The primary argument against self-determination is that Siberia relies on support from Western Russia for essential goods, such as food and manufactured products. However, this is based on existing import and export levels which could potentially change under independent economic policy.

== History ==
The idea came about in the mid-19th century and took shape with the military activities of Aleksandr Kolchak and Viktor Pepelyayev during the Russian Civil War.

In 1918 two provisional governments were formed, one in Vladivostok and another in Omsk. Both governments merged by the end of the year into the Provisional All-Russian Government. In 1922 Siberia became part of the Soviet Union.

The idea of an independent Siberia was considered in 1989, during the election of the Congress of People's Deputies of the Soviet Union, but they reached a compromise with the Siberian Agreement, which gave more regional power to the local leaders.

In 1992, after the dissolution of the Soviet Union, Siberian autonomy was considered again, but the Siberian territories were consolidated under the Siberian Agreement, which stated in its resolution that if the demands of Siberians were ignored, they would "accelerate the creation of the Siberian republic."

After the annexation of Crimea by the Russian Federation in 2014, performance artist Artyom Loskutov attempted to organize a mock demonstration called Monstration to promote the idea of a Siberian Republic within the Russian Federation, on 17 August in Novosibirsk, to promote Siberian federalisation. Alexei Navalny announced the event in his blog, but the Kremlin launched a media blackout of the event. Russian politician Nikolai Valuyev called it the "first attempt of global efforts to promote separatism in Russia." Russian media watchdog Roskomnadzor issued warnings to 14 media outlets that ran the story and threatened to close BBC Russian Service.

== See also ==
- Siberian regionalism
- Autonomous subdivisions of Russia
- List of active separatist movements in Asia
