= Monstration =

Performance replicating public protest

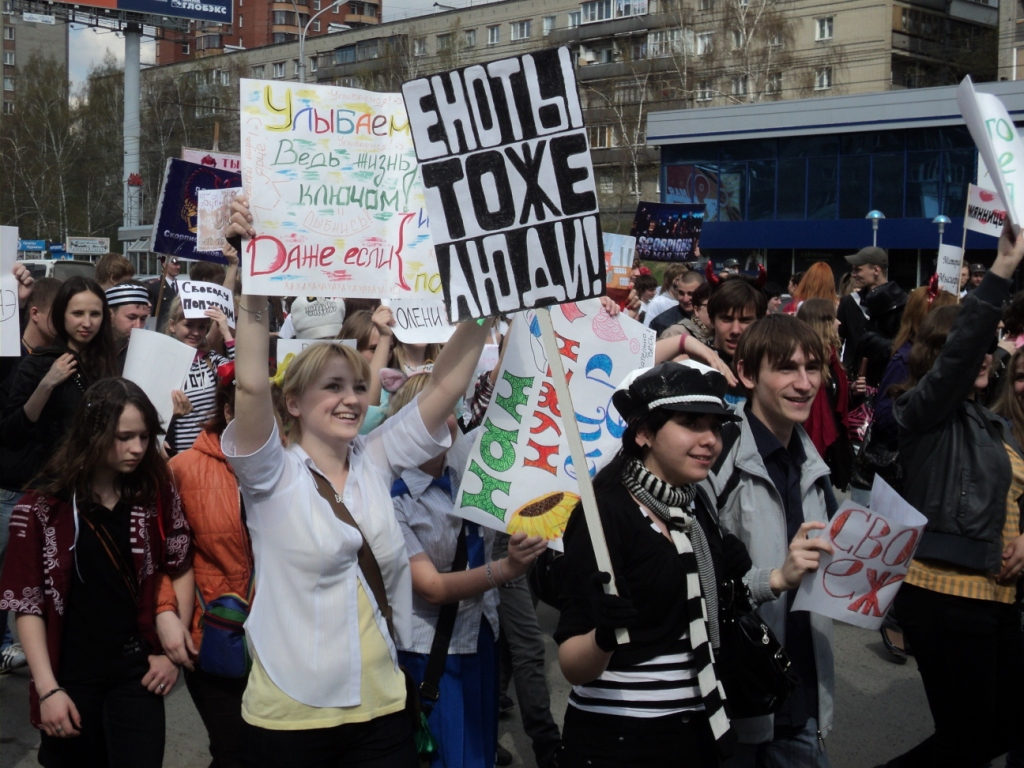
Monstration signs are meant to be nonsensical, like "Raccoons are people too!"

A monstration is a public performance similar to a demonstration but intended as creative performance art, often parodying a serious demonstration. The term was coined by Russian artist Ivan Dyrkin in 2004, and the phenomenon has been most popular in Russia.

== History ==
=== Soviet Union and Russia ===
In the 1920s and 1930s, similar processions took place in the Soviet Union. For example, there was a carnival demonstration in defense of beneficial birds. The participants of this procession carried banners like "The tit exterminates 6500 caterpillars a year". But basically these actions were of anti-religious content.

==== Novosibirsk ====
In 1933, an anti-religious demonstration took place in Novosibirsk on Christmas Eve. Costumed Komsomol members marched around the city with effigies of priests and crosses and completed the action by burning a Christmas tree near the Lenin House.

In the 1960s and 1980s, absurdist demonstrations were held by the youth of Novosibirsk Akademgorodok. In the 1960s, these actions were organized by the Integral Club.

In November 1995, a march of artists and poets was held, also known as the Styobius Strip (Лента стёбиуса).

In 2004, Artyom Loskutov and members of the Contemporary Art Terrorism group in Novosibirsk joined the annual May Day demonstration. They were carrying posters with deliberately absurd slogans in an attempt to shake up a boring political procession and to make fun. Fellow Siberian artist Ivan Dyrkin named the march "Monstration," a demonstration without the prefix de, which he considered a negative connotation as in deconstruction or degradation.

==== Other cities ====
The modern monstration incorporates signs and messages that are deliberately absurd, nonsensical and apolitical that indirectly defy the government and express a conceptual paradox. Although monstrations are apolitical, participants have been arrested for political agitation. In 2010, Monstrations took place in 20 cities like Moscow, Saint Petersburg, and Vladivostok.

The first monstration in Kursk took place on 1 May 2014. About 30 people went with the main slogan "For the rights of butterflies in the stomach".

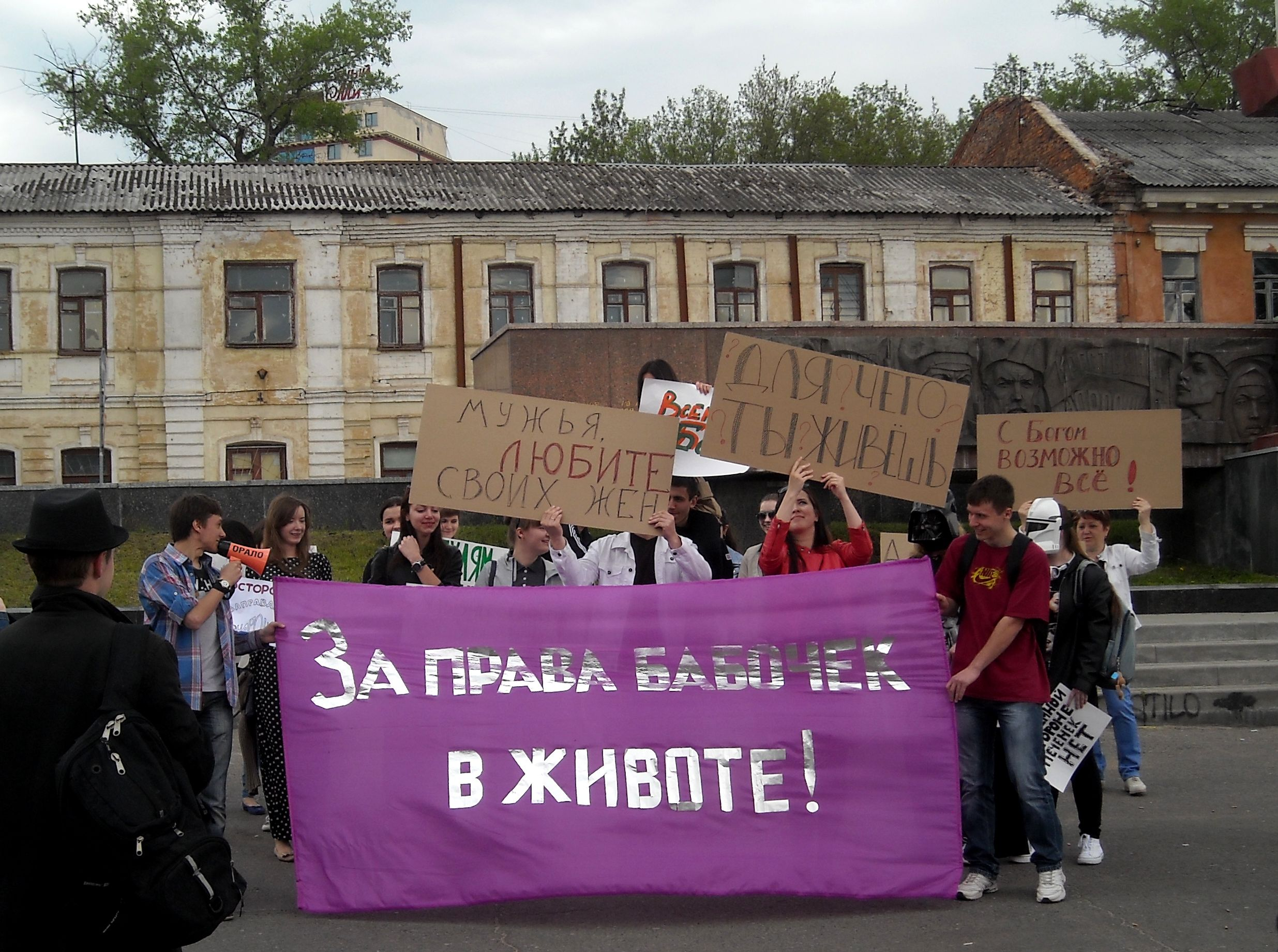
"For the rights of butterflies in the stomach"

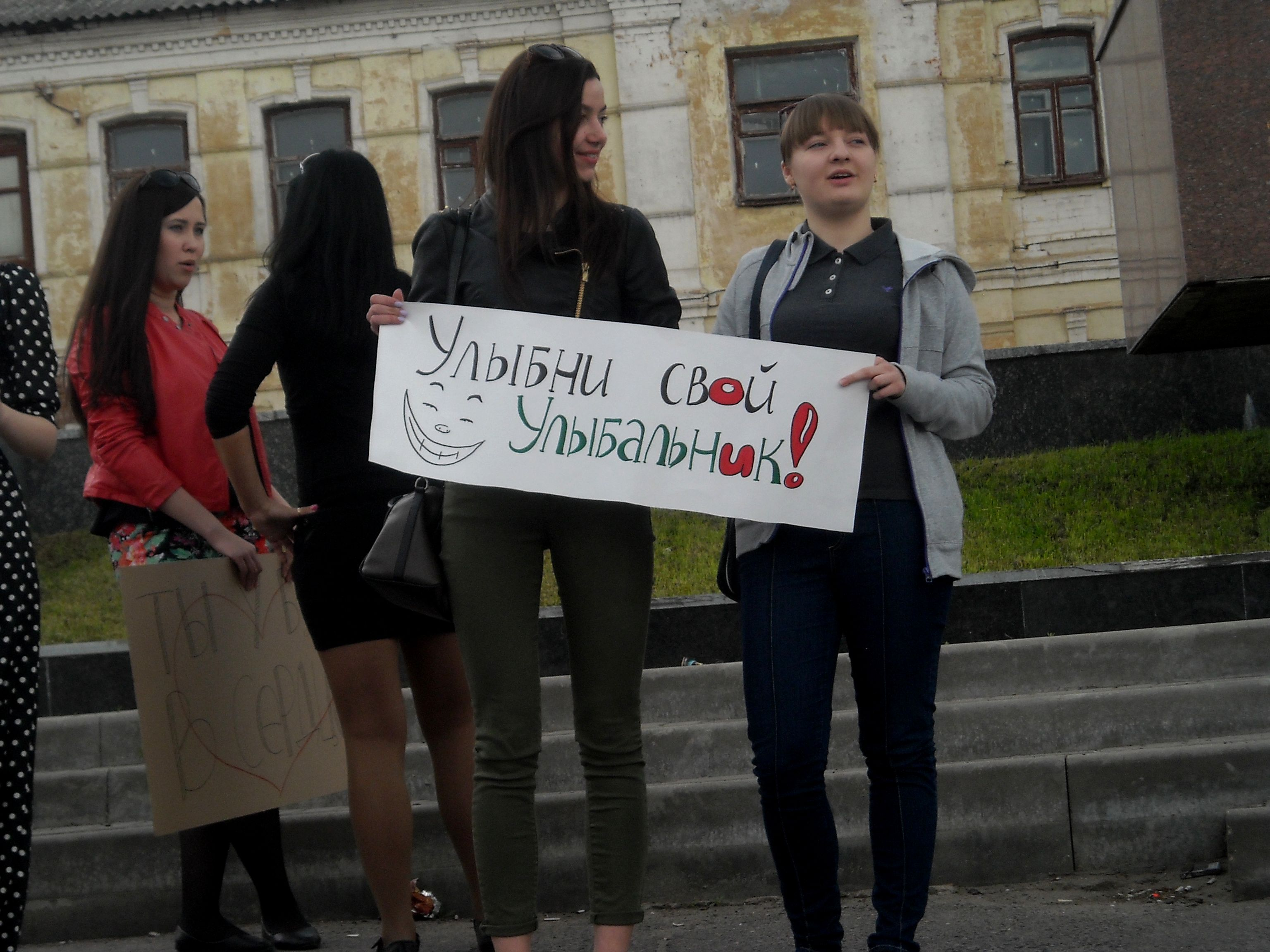
"Smile your smiler!"

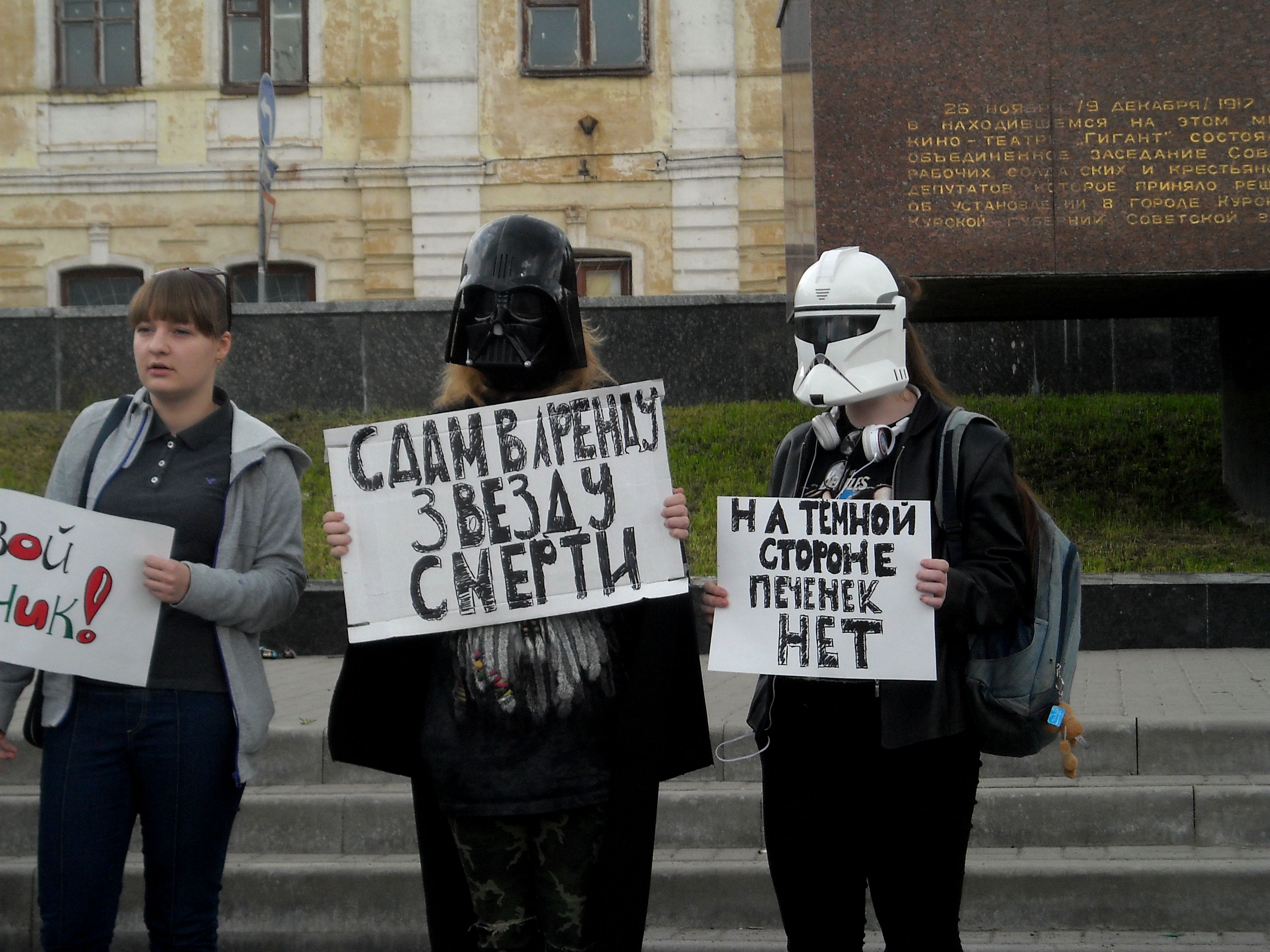
"Death Star for rent" and "Dark side has no cookies"

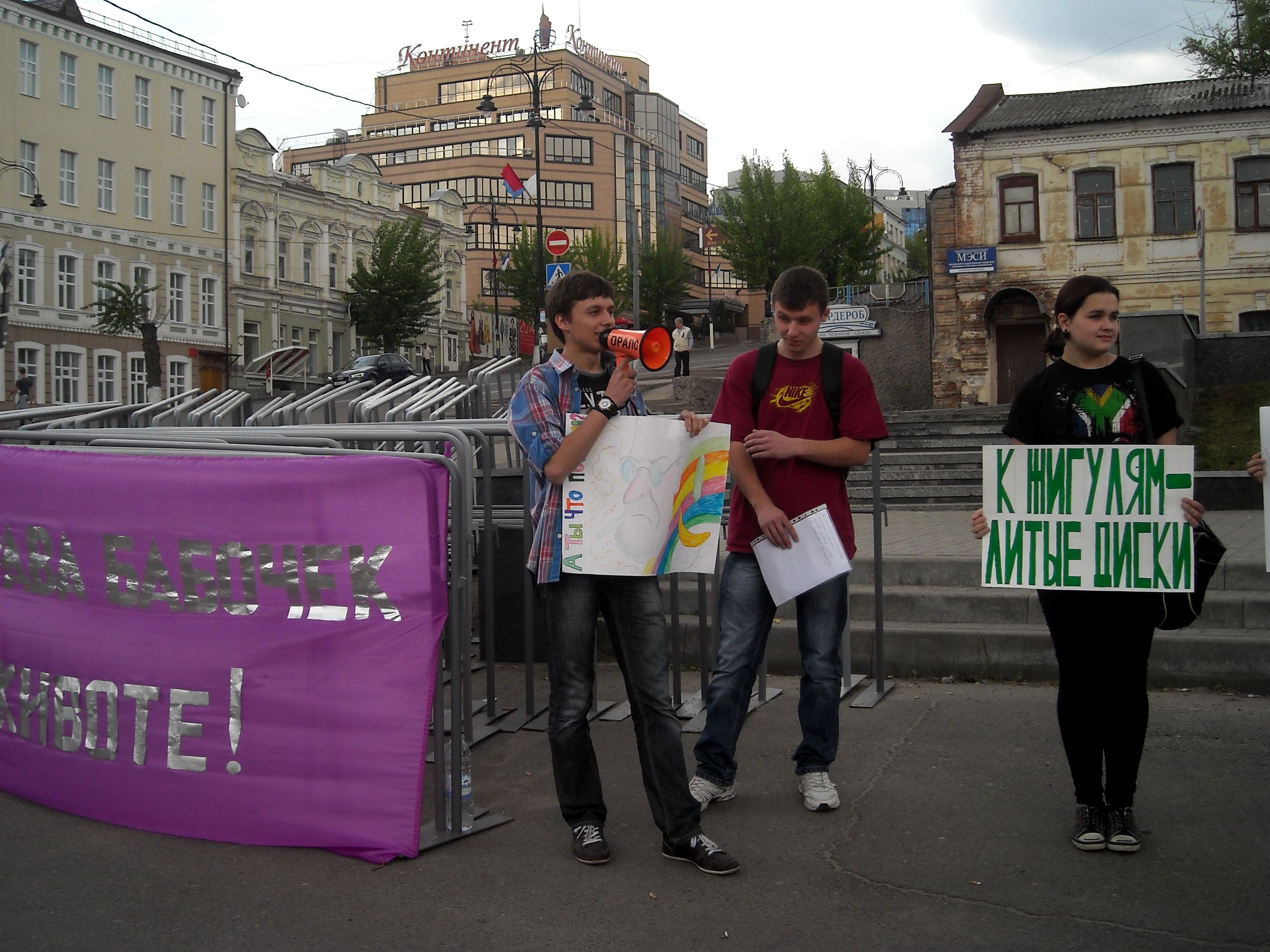
"Alloy wheels to Zhiguli".

In 2015, the main slogan was "We did not watch Fifty Shades".

=== Poland ===
Orange Alternative (Polish: Pomarańczowa Alternatywa) was a Polish anti-communist underground movement, started in Wrocław, a city in south-west Poland, in the 1980s. Its main purpose was to offer a wider group of citizens an alternative way of opposition against the authoritarian regime by means of peaceful street protests that used absurd and nonsensical elements.

=== Alytus, Lithuania ===
From 2009 to 2017 a series of Art strike Biennales were held at the Alytus art school, organised by Redas Diržys and the psychic workers union.

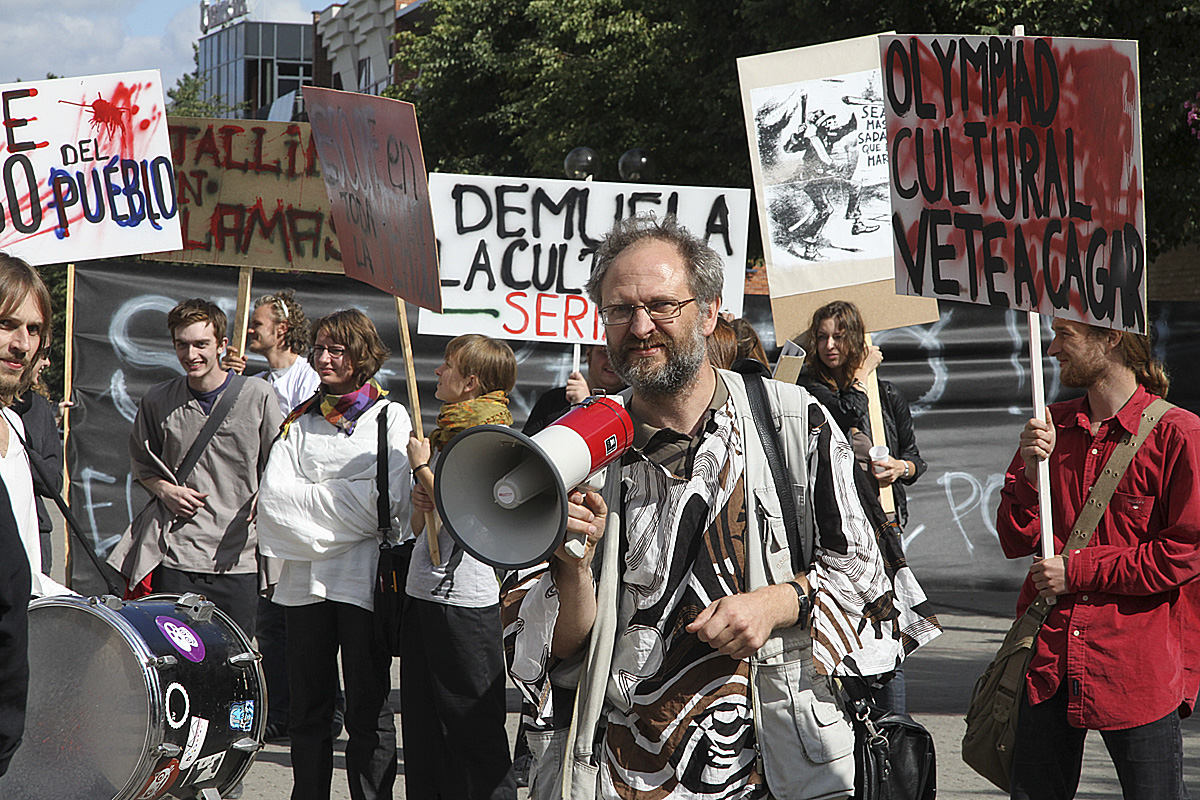
"Alytus Biennial 2009 Monstration - Artist United Will Never Be Divided"

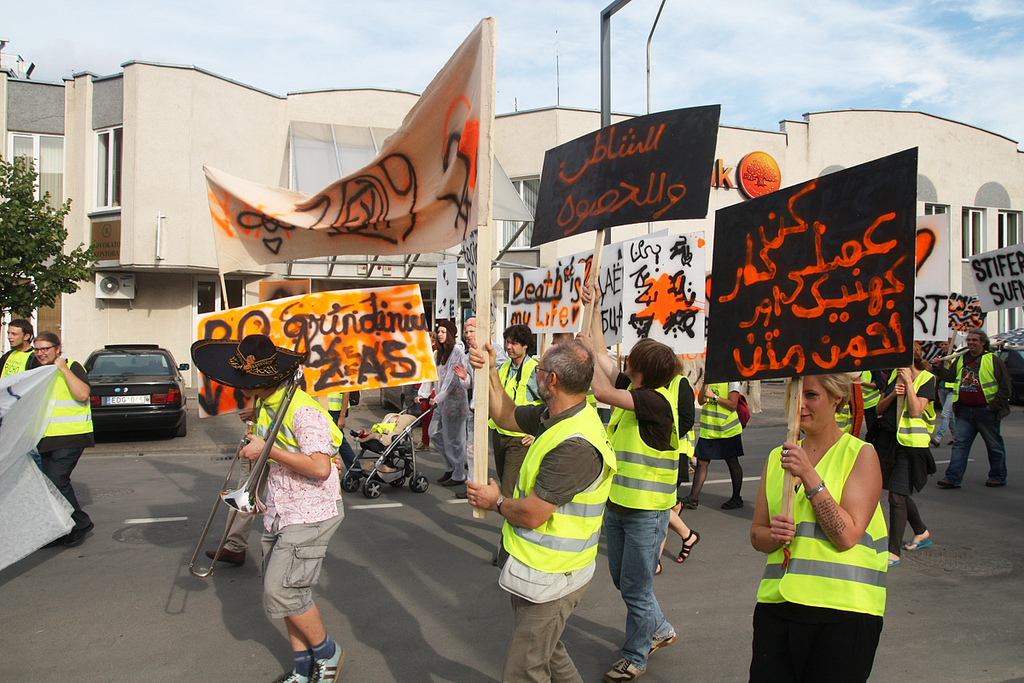
"Alytus Biennial 2011 Monstration"

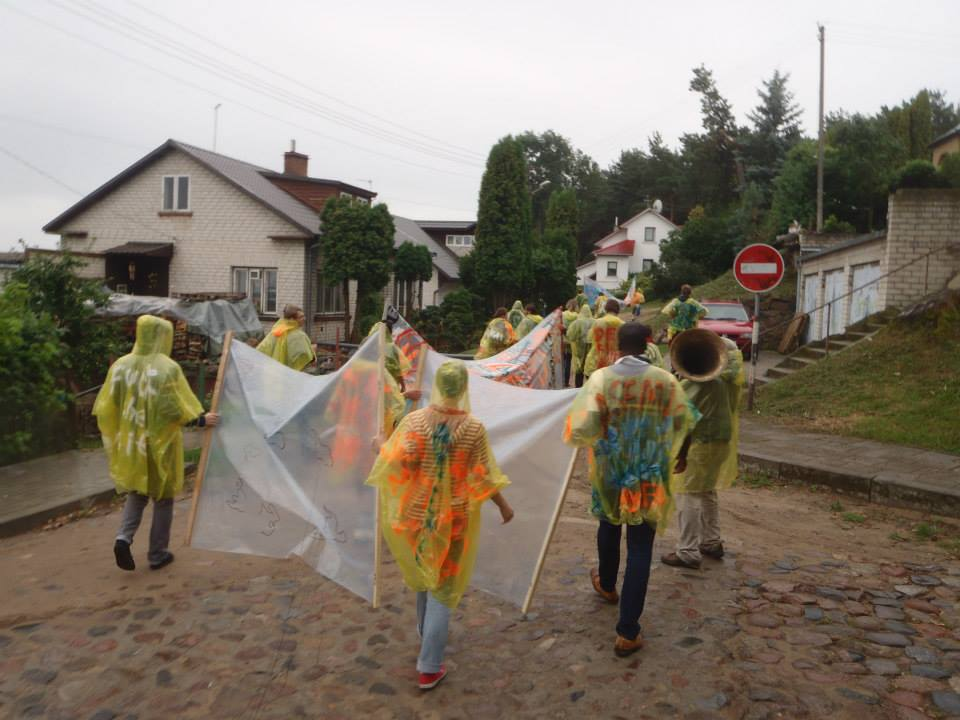
"Alytus Psychic Strike 2013 Monstration"

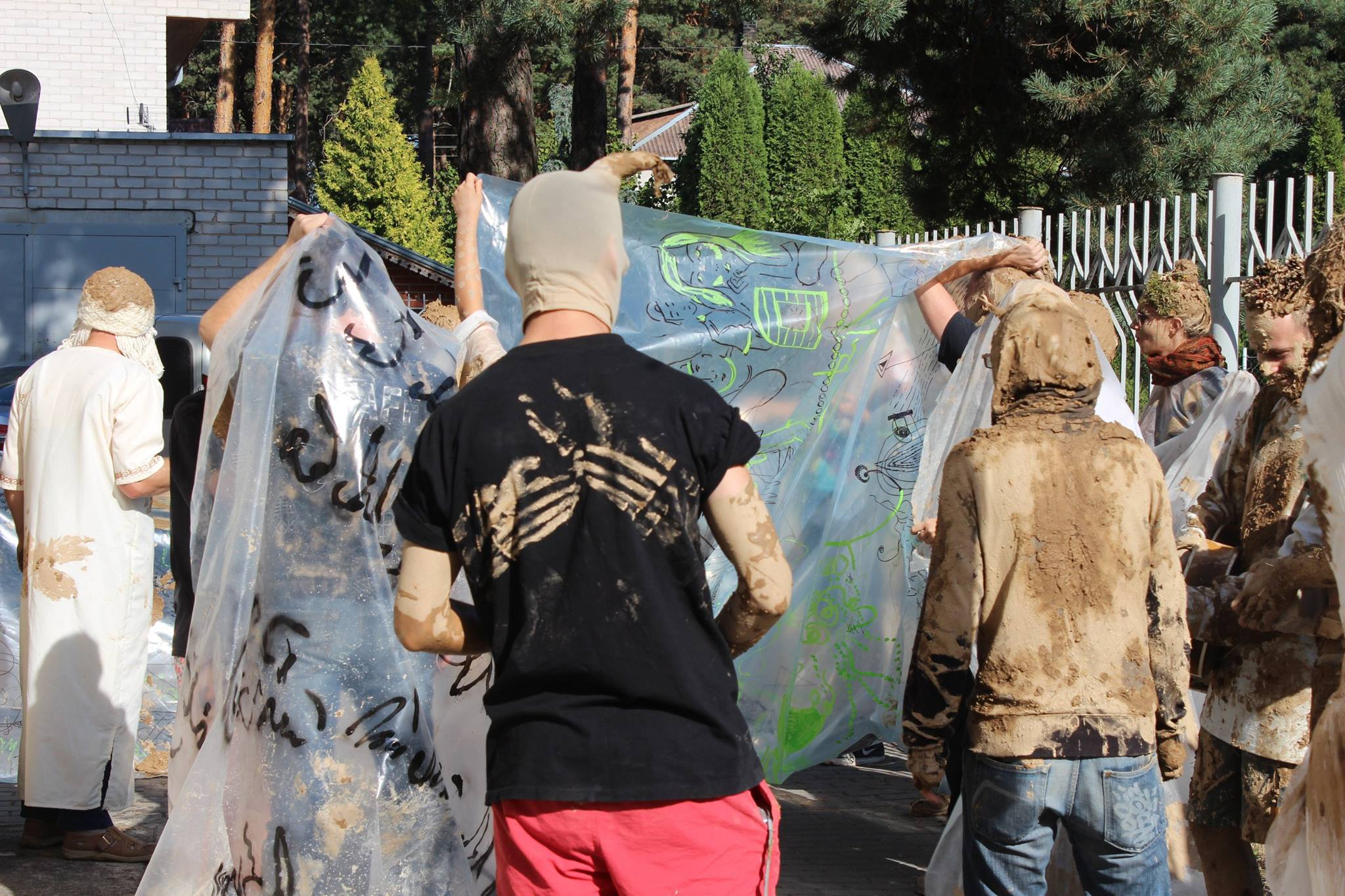
"Alytus Psychic Strike 2015 Monstration"

== Recognition ==
In 2011, Monstration was recognized for "Innovation" by the National Centre for Contemporary Arts and selected as "Best regional project."

== Government outrage ==
In 2014, Artyom Loskutov attempted to organize a routine monstration for August 17, when he ran into trouble. "We were talking about having a march, which is absolutely allowed under law," Loskutov says. "But in writing about it, we wrote about creating a Siberian Republic within the Russian Federation. There was no talk about separatism or anything, it's just that Moscow doesn't govern the regions very effectively."

The purpose of the protest was to ridicule Kremlin's hypocrisy in the Annexation of Crimea by the Russian Federation and to raise awareness about politics in Siberia. "They decided to tell us how great it is when some republic moves for self-determination. Okay, well let's apply this to other regions. Can Siberia allow itself this same rhetoric? It turns out it can't."

Russian telecommunications regulator Roskomnadzor launched a media blackout of the event, issued warnings to 14 media outlets that ran the story and threatened to close BBC Russian Service for reporting the announcement. Roskomnadzor also launched an official investigation against BBC to confirm "an apparent violation of the law." In response, BBC added a description of the event as a “parody” that in no way promoted Siberia's independence from Moscow.

Russian authorities compared the potential monstration protest to Euromaidan that led to the 2014 Ukrainian revolution. Nikolai Valuyev called it the "first attempt of global efforts to promote separatism in Russia."

According to Dmitry Zhuravlyov, director of Institute for Regional Problems based in Moscow, "I can understand the position of these people [organizers of the march] on a psychological level," Zhuravlyov said. "They want to have more control over the riches of Siberia, and that is understandable. But what is unacceptable to Russia is that this whole idea goes against the Constitution. You cannot change the status of your region just like that." President Vladimir Putin recently signed legislation that introduced prison sentences for violations of territorial integrity in Russia.

== See also ==
- Internet censorship in Russia
- Demonstration (acting)
