= Loskutov =

Loskutov (Russian: Лоскутов, from лоскут meaning patch) is a Russian masculine surname, its feminine counterpart is Loskutova. It may refer to

- Artyom Loskutov (born 1986), Russian performance artist
- Pavel Loskutov (born 1969), Estonian long-distance runner
