= Art Strike =

The first known reference to an Art Strike appears in an Alain Jouffroy essay: "What's To Be Done About Art?" (included in "Art and Confrontation," New York Graphic Society 1968).

"It is essential that the minority advocate the necessity of going on an 'active art strike' using the machines of the culture industry to set it in total contradiction to itself. The intention is not to end the rule of production, but to change the most adventurous part of 'artistic' production into the production of revolutionary ideas, forms, and techniques."

== Black Emergency Cultural Coalition (1969-84) ==
The Black Emergency Cultural Coalition (BECC) was organized in January 1969 by a group of 75 African-American artists in direct response to the Metropolitan Museum of Art's "Harlem on My Mind" exhibit. The co-chairmen at the time of creation were Benny Andrews, Henri Ghent, and Edward Taylor. The group protested the exhibit, which omitted contributions from African-American artists, and agitated for change in New York art museums, demanding greater representation of African-American artists and the establishment of an African-American curatorial presence.

== Art Workers Coalition (1969-70) ==
The Art Workers Coalition (AWC) was a collection of artists, dealers, museum workers, and other workers in the art industry; including Carl Andre and Lucy Lippard.

On October 15, 1969, the AWC organized a successful "Moratorium of Art to End the War in Vietnam." The Museum of Modern Art, the Whitney Museum, the Jewish Museum, and a large number of commercial art galleries closed for the day. The Metropolitan Museum and the Guggenheim Museum did not comply. Under pressure from the AWC, the Metropolitan postponed the opening of its American painting and sculpture show scheduled for that day, and the Guggenheim got picketed.

The group also called upon all museums in New York to close on May 22, 1970, as part of the protests against the Vietnam War. While many did, the Metropolitan Museum of Art failed to do so. This led to picketing by an offshoot, led by Robert Morris and Poppy Johnson, under the name Art Strike Against Racism, War, and Oppression.

The group extended its antiwar protests and protests against the killing of student protesters by the police at Jackson, Augusta, and Kent by calling for a boycott of the American Pavilion at the 1970 Venice Biennale. The group organized a counter-biennial in New York. This was then criticized by the Women Students and Artists for Black Art Liberation (WSABAL) directed by Faith Ringgold and joined by Michele Wallace, which led to it opening up to women and people of color. The WSABAL group also influenced the Ad Hoc Committee of Women Artists, founded by Lucy Lippard and others. These two groups both had a demand of 50 percent women artist representation. Their protests led to the inclusion of black women artists Barbara Chase Riboud and Bettye Saar in the next Whitney Biennial.

== Years without Art (1977-80) ==
In 1974, Gustav Metzger issued a call for artists to withdraw their labor for a minimum of three years.

The call criticizes doctrines such as "artists engagement with political struggle" and "the use of art for social change" as well as "art in the service of revolution" as reactionary. Instead, it states that "artists have attacked the prevailing methods of production, distribution, and consumption of art" and that "the refusal of labor is the chief weapon of workers fighting the system." Three years cite as the "minimum period required to cripple the system."

Although the call does not use the words "Art Strike," Metzger has come to be associated with the concept.

== The Art Strike (1990-93) ==
The Art Strike was a campaign launched in 1986 by Stewart Home which called upon all artists to cease their artistic work between January 1, 1990, and January 1, 1993. Home, who was a Neoist artist at the time, used the same language as Metzger's 1974 call, only replacing the dates 1977–80 with 1990–93.

In the lead-up to the strike, various groups formed to propagate and co-ordinate the action, such as the Art Strike Action Committee in California and the Art Strike Action Committee in the United Kingdom.

== Art Strike Biennial (2009-12) ==
In 2008, an Art Strike conference held in Alytus with an international group of artists attending. After this conference, Redas Diržys, under the name the Second Temporary Art Strike Action Committee–Alytus Chapter (STASAC-Alytus), decided to retitle the annual Festival of Experimental Art as the Art Strike Biennial. This was done in response to Vilnius becoming the European Capital of Culture for 2009. Stewart Home also took part in this event, calling himself the Transient Art Strike Biennial Supreme Council of One (London)

This led to a series of art strikes including:

- Denis Limonov of the Belarusian art collective Lipovy Tzvet From January 1, 2014, through January 1, 2017
- Pablo Herman and OKK, an art strike in Berlin

In 2011, the biennial began to organize as the Data Miners Travailleurs Psychique. Redas and others formally refused the identification of artists and put forward the idea of psychic workers instead, calling for a General strike in 2012. Instead of making of art works the strike events would organise monstrations and games of Three sided football.

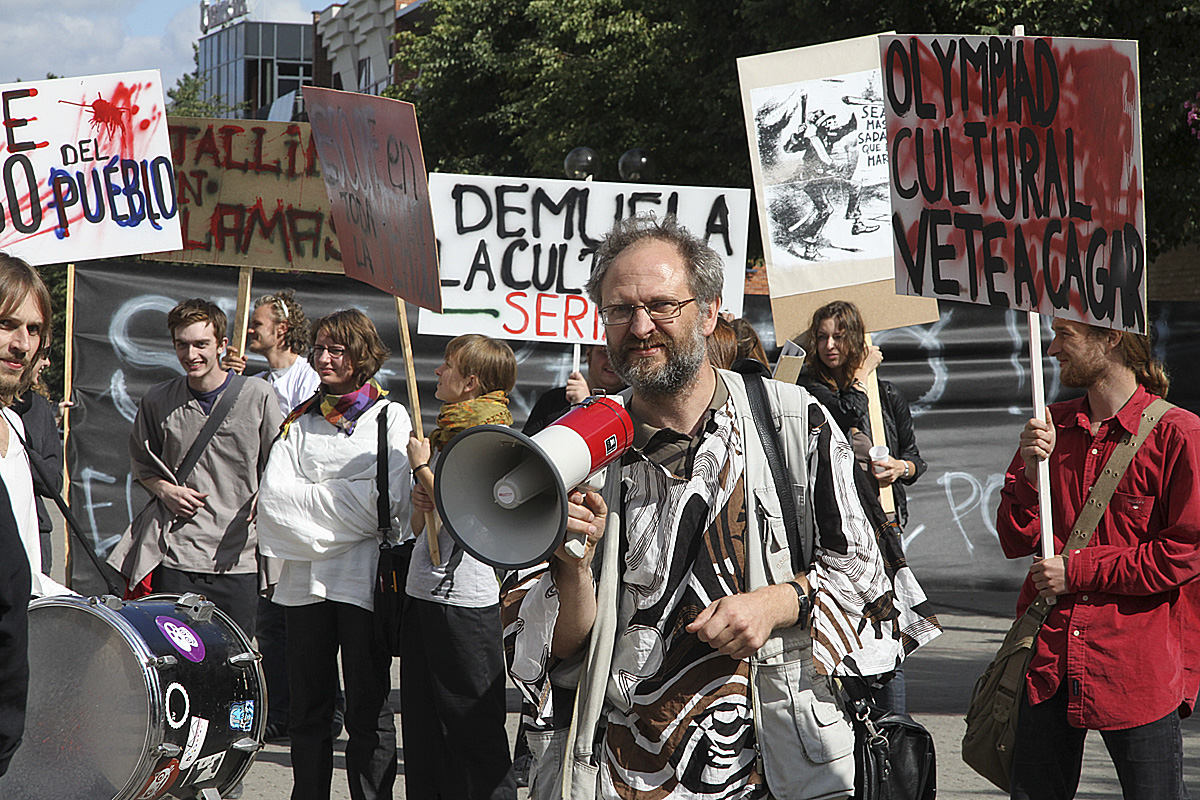
"Alytus Biennial 2009 Monstration - Artist United Will Never Be Divided"

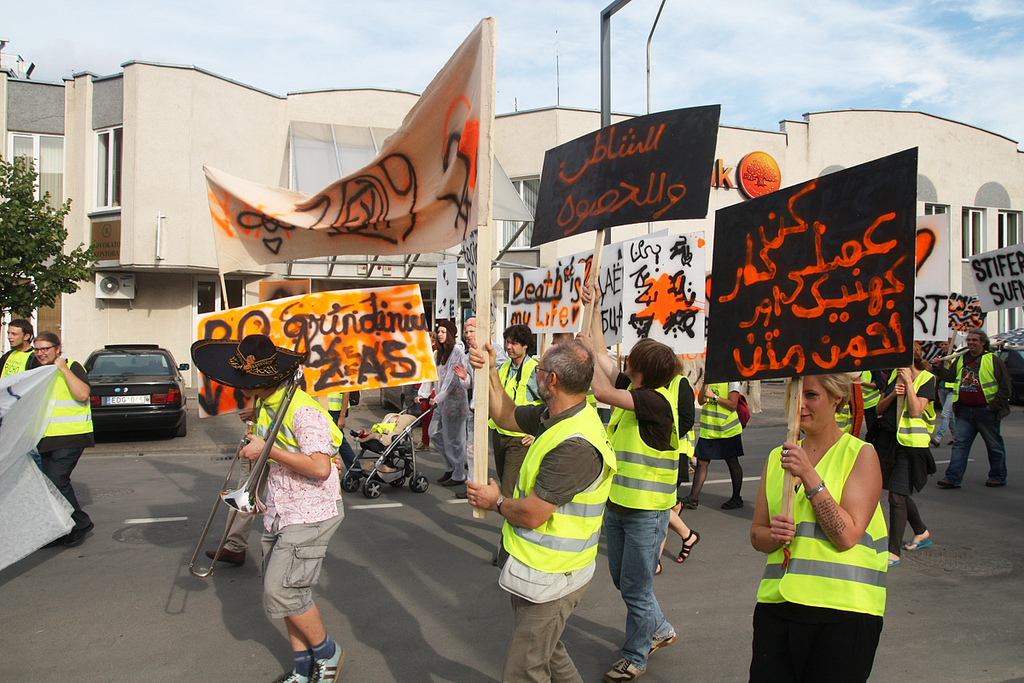
"Alytus Biennial 2011 Monstration"

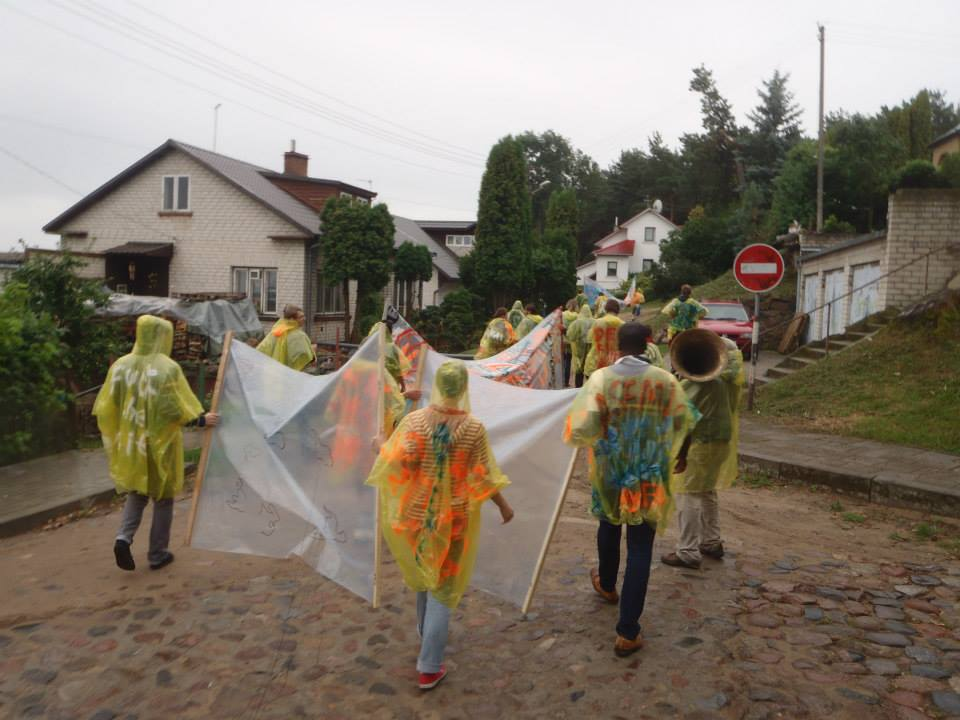
"Alytus Psychic Strike 2013 Monstration"

== Other recent and contemporary groups ==
In both the US and England, there are other examples of artists, artist unions, and artists collectives working concurrently. Of these, three prominent groups are Artists' Union England, Occupy Wall Street Arts & Labor, and Working Artists and the Greater Economy (W.A.G.E.) The Strike MoMA campaign is the latest of these in 2021.

Comparisons have made between the psychic worker's art strike and the idea of the "Human Strike." The notion of the Human Strike as an act of defiance was introduced by communization theorists Tiqqun, The Invisible Committee and Claire Fontaine.

== See also ==
- Anti-art
- Social movement
- Strike action
- Harlem on My Mind protest
- Situationism
