= Afanasy Shchapov =

Russian historian

Afanasiy Prokopievich Shchapov
- Афанасий Прокофьевич Щапов
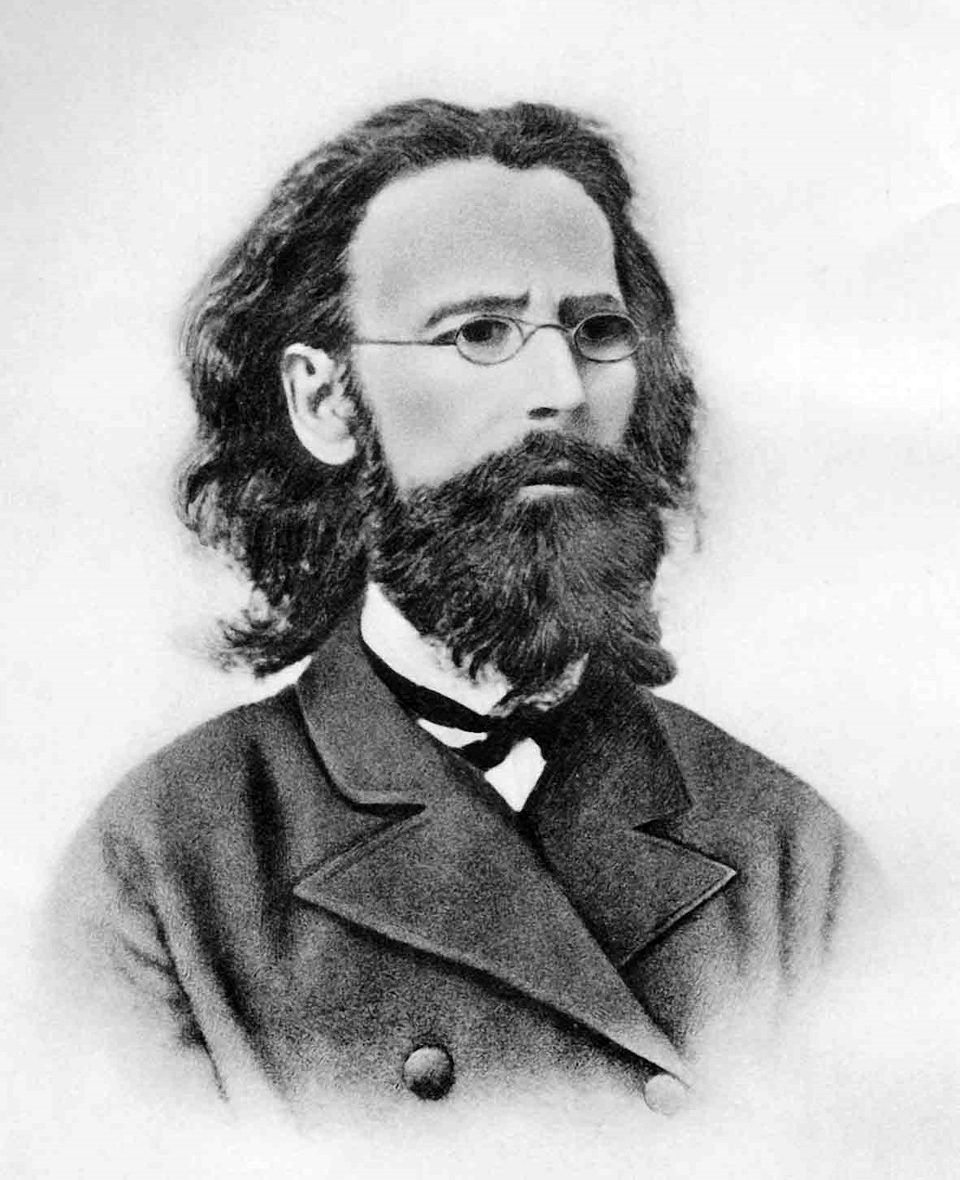
- Born: (5 October [N.S. 17 October] 1830
- Died: February 27 [ N.S.10 March] 1876
- Occupation: Historian

Afanasiy Prokopievich Shchapov (Russian: Афанасий Прокофьевич Щапов) (5 October [N.S. 17 October] 1830 – February 27 [ N.S.10 March] 1876) was a Russian historian accused of "Siberian nationalism" and persecuted by tsarist authorities.

== Life ==
Afanasiy Shchapov was born in the village of Anga some 210 miles from Irkutsk, into a family of a Russian sexton and Buryat peasant woman. Educated in Irkutsk, he moved to Kazan and became a student at Kazan Theological Academy (1852–1856). Upon receiving his bachelor's degree, Shchapov began to deliver lectures on Russian history at his alma mater (1856–1860) and later at Kazan University (1860–1861). He also studied the Solovetsky Monastery library, which had been evacuated during the Crimean War to Kazan. Fascinated with the Solovetsky Uprising, Shchapov started writing articles about the Raskol and Old Believers. On April 16, 1861, he delivered a revolutionary speech dedicated to the victims of the Bezdna Unrest, after which he was arrested and escorted to Saint Petersburg. After the investigation, Shchapov was dismissed as a teacher and appointed to the Ministry of the Interior as an official in charge of the sectarian affairs. In 1862, he was discharged and placed under police surveillance.

Afanasiy Shchapov was a contributor for many Russian magazines, such as Отечественные записки (Notes on Fatherland), Русское слово (Russian Word), Время (Time), Век (Century), and others. In 1864, he was exiled to his native village and then Irkutsk on suspicion of his connections with Alexander Hertzen and Nikolai Ogarev. In the summer of 1865, Shchapov was arrested in connection with the so-called Siberian oblastniks affair. After his release, he worked in a number of magazines, including Дело (Cause), Записки Сибирского отдела РГО (Notes of the Siberian Department of the Russian Geographic Society), and others. In 1866, Shchapov took part in an expedition to the Turukhansk regions as an ethnographer, organized by the Siberian Department of the Russian Geographic Society. Afanasiy Shchapov died of tuberculosis in 1876.

== Ideas ==
Afanasiy Shchapov authored many works on the history of sectarianism and Raskol, which he viewed as a manifestation of popular protest against social oppression. In 1856-1864, influenced by Grigory Yeliseyev and Stepan Yeshevsky, he came forward as a supporter of the so-called "zemstvo-oblast theory" (земско-областническая теория), viewing Russian history as an interaction process between certain "oblasts". Shchapov's focus on geography and economics as two principal agencies in history is thought to have heralded the next generation of Russian historians, as represented by Vasily Klyuchevsky, Paul Vinogradoff, and Michael Rostovtzeff. Since geographical conditions of various Russian lands differed enormously, Shchapov scorned the possibility of writing a general history of Russia. He held that Sibiryaks were ethnically distinct from the rest of Russian nation, as their character was shaped by rugged nature of inhospitable land they lived in and by the adventurous and enterprising spirit of the Old Believers who had been the original settlers of Siberia.

== See also ==
- Slavophile
- Mykola Kostomarov
- Henry Thomas Buckle
