= Bezdna unrest =

Post-serfdom unrest in the Russian Empire

Date	April 1861
Location	Bezdna, Kazan Governorate, Russian Empire
Result	Uprising suppressed

Belligerents
Peasants	Russian Imperial Army

Commanders and leaders
Anton Petrov (executed)	

Strength
4,000–5,000 protesters	

Casualties and losses
100–300 peasants wounded and killed	

The Bezdna peasant revolt, also known as the Bezdna unrest (Russian: Бездненские волнения) was an uprising organised by former serfs after the 1861 Russian Emancipation Reform. The event took place in the Spassky Uyezd of Kazan Governorate, specifically in a village of Bezdna (Russian: Бездна, Biznä Tatar Cyrillic: Бизнә). The leader of the unrest was a literate peasant Anton Petrov. He began convincing his neighbours that the local officials were misinterpreting new reforms brought about by the 1861 Russian Emancipation Reform. The insurgents believed that the tsar had granted them total freedom and declared that they would refuse to continue to pay payments to their landlords and suspend all works on their lots. Thousands of peasants joined the unrest. The unrest was put down by Major General Count Apraksin and a group of military troops who opened fire on the peasants. Between one hundred and three hundred peasants were either wounded or killed.

== Russia after serfdom ==
With the Emancipation Reform of 1861 in Russia, Tsar Alexander II abolished serfdom throughout the Russian Empire. He reportedly echoed:

"There are rumors that I want to announce the emancipation of the peasants. I will not say to you that I am completely against this. We live in such an age that this has to happen in time. I think that you agree with me. Therefore, it is much better that this business be carried out from above, rather than from below.”

=== The manifesto in Bezdna ===

The Emancipation act reached Kazan province in late March to early April 1861. Peasants expected the tsar to grant them full freedom (volia) from any obligations to landowners. When the manifesto was read out loud by various estate officials, the peasants realized the terms of the emancipation favored the landowners over themselves. The peasants charged the officials with misrepresenting the content of the act and sought out various people in their own ranks to read the document to them. The most prominent of these peasant readers was Anton Petrov, a literate peasant from the village of Bezdna. Anton interpreted the document to mean that peasants were free from obligation to any authority but the tsar's. He "mistook a figure meaning 10 per cent for the seal of St. Anne, and ... decided that this was the sign granting liberty." The local officials attempted and failed to persuade the peasants that Petrov's rendering of the text was not true.

== Days leading up to the revolt ==
During the days leading up to the revolt, the peasants in Bezdna had been asserting their freedom and refusing to work. Count Apraksin noted that he had been receiving messages from the landowners in the region complaining about the situation. He petitioned for two companies of soldiers from "the commander of Fourth Reserve Battalion of the Taruntino Infantry Regiment." Apraksin reached the area on April 9.

On April 10, Apraksin was given an overview of the situation by the marshal of the nobility. The marshal informed Apraksin that peasants from other areas were coming to Bezdna to hear Petrov and that the peasants were guarding his house to prevent his arrest. A large uprising was possible and no capable reserve troops were in the district. Apraksin attempted to convince the peasants to assemble stating that he would "clear up any misunderstandings that had arisen," but they did not agree to this. In an official report written by Apraksin after the revolt, he stated the peasants were bold and defiant. Apraksin then went to a nearby village while he waited for military reinforcement.

By the 11th Apraksin had 231 soldiers to restore order in the region. The governor of Kazan Province had sent an additional two companies of soldiers but they did not arrive on time.

=== Day of revolt (April 12) ===
News of Anton Petrov and his interpretation of the manifesto had spread. By April 12, a group of peasants from other villages and provinces had converged on Bezdna. There is debate regarding the number of peasants who had converged at Bezdna. Apraksin had first estimated the amount to the 5,000. Afterwards, he wrote that 10,000 peasants had gathered in Bezdna by April 12. An enquiry carried out by a civilian commission estimated the number to be around 4,000. The situation seemed critical and Apraksin decided to confront the peasants with his soldiers. On the morning of the 12th of April, Apraksin entered the village of Bezdna with his military troops. Apraksin and the troops went to the group of peasants surrounding Petrov's house. Apraksin ordered the arrest of Petrov. The peasants refused this order. According to Apraksin, the peasants were bold and defiant. Apraksin ordered his men to shoot several volleys. Between 100 -300 peasants were either killed or wounded.

Anton Petrov was arrested and taken to the fortress in Spassk.

== Aftermath ==
=== Anton Petrov ===
Petrov was tried by a field court martial in Bezdna on the 16th of April. On April 17, Petrov was found guilty of inciting the uprising and was sentenced to death by shooting. He was executed on the 19th of April. Order was predominantly restored in the area.

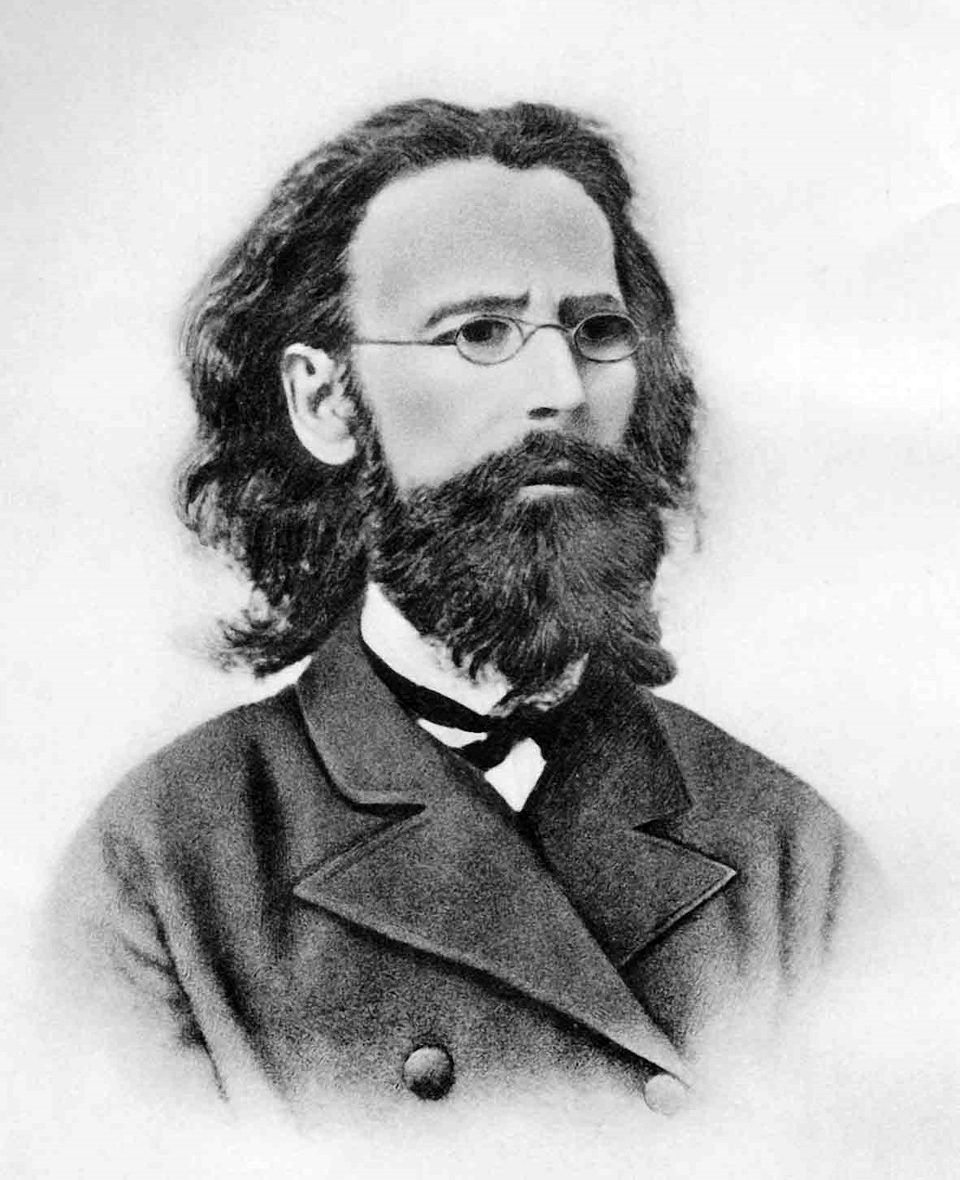
An image of Alfanasy Shchapov

=== Kazan service ===
Students at Kazan University arranged a requiem service for the slain peasants. The service was held a few days after the massacre. Afanasy Shchapov, a historian at Kazan University, gave the eulogy. Shchapov portrayed Anton Petrov as a prophet who was to liberate the peasant. His speech was thought to be too inflammatory and almost revolutionary in nature by the imperial government. Shchapov's address was written down and spread throughout the populace.

Alexander II ordered Shchapov to be arrested and taken to St. Petersburg. In the capital, Shchapov and his eulogy were investigated. He was eventually pardoned by the tsar as it was difficult for the government to sentence Shchapov due to lack of hard evidence. Shchapov was eventually exiled to Siberia in 1862.

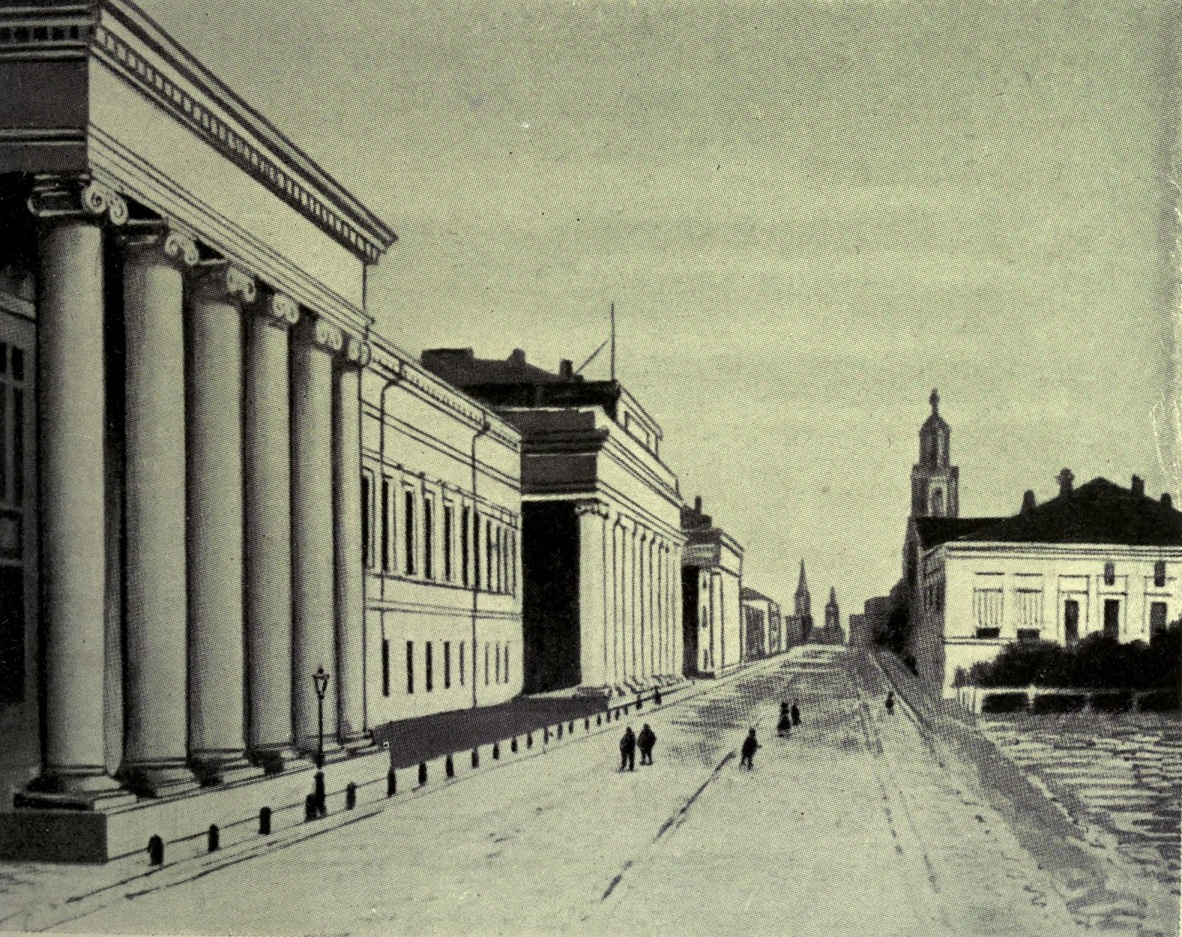
Kazan University as it appeared in the 1840s

== Explanations for the uprising ==
=== Peasant monarchism ===
Historians and contemporaries of the uprising have explained the revolt as a result of peasant or popular monarchism. This monarchism was the belief that the tsar was the benevolent father of the peasantry and would favor them if he knew of their sufferings. The elites were blamed as the one who blacked the tsar's true will and were the enemies of the peasants.

This concept had existed in Russia for centuries and was connected to Orthodoxy and culture.

=== Religion ===
In his address after the massacre, Shchapov identified Petrov as the head of a religious sect called the Khlysty. This group, originally called Khristy (Christs), “believed in multiple reincarnations of Christs and saw their leaders as such[.]” The Orthodox Christians, who were suspicious of this sect, called them khlysty (flagellants). In his eulogy, Shchapov referred to the slain peasants as “democratic Christs,” using the language of the sect.

== Legacy ==
The Bezdna Unrest is considered one of the greatest peasant uprisings in the wake of the 1861 reforms. "The events in Bezdna produced a tremendous impression on Russian society, which was enhanced by A. P. Shchapov's speech at the funeral mass for the peasant victims. Hand-written manuscripts of the speech circulated widely, while Herzen's Kolokol discussed both the revolt and Shchapov's speech."

According to his writings in the London Russian language magazine, The Bell, Alexander Herzen criticizes the Russian government for their complete disregard for human life and the fact that the government did not publicly acknowledge the unrest until a month after it had occurred.
