= Redas Diržys =

Director of Art School of Asylus

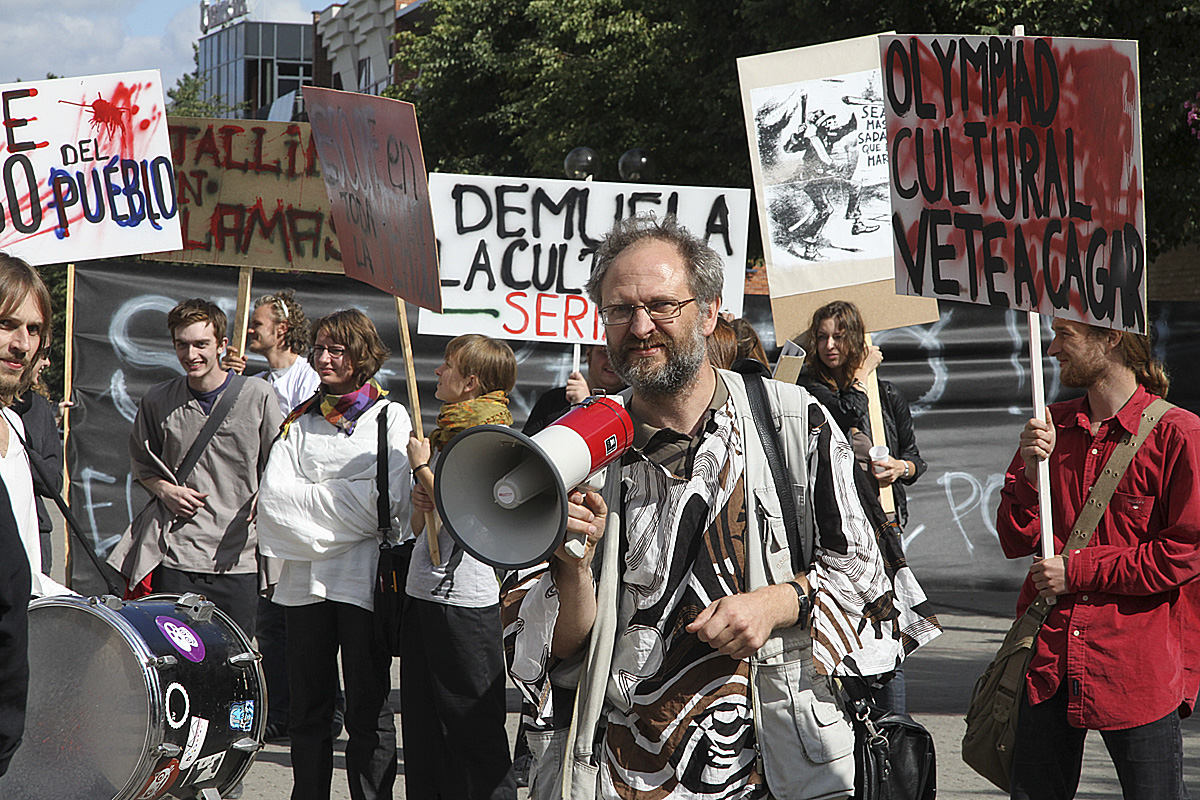
Redas at the Alytus Biennial 2009 Monstration - Artist United Will Never Be Divided

Redas Diržys (b 1967) is the director of the Art School of Alytus, in Alytus, Lithuania. Apart from this role, he is also known internationally for social art interventions, performance art and socially engaged artistic practices.

He studied at the Estonian Academy of Arts, and served as Director of the Art school in Alytus in 1993. He is the organizer of the Alytus Biennial Festival of Experimental Art, an international event which takes place every 2 years around the school. In 2009 in response to Vilnius being made European City of Culture, the biennial was declared an Art Strike Biennial. At this time Redas also refused the title of artist and started to identify as a psychic worker.
