= Butterflies in the stomach =

Fluttery feeling in stomach

- Other names: Fluttering sensation; Nervous stomach
- Symptoms: Fluttering in the abdomen; Nausea; Tightness in chest; Increased heart rate
- Usual onset: Acute (during stress or excitement)
- Duration: Transient
- Causes: Fight-or-flight response; Anxiety; Limerence; Social stress
- Diagnostic method: Clinical assessment
- Differential diagnosis: Irritable bowel syndrome; Gastritis; Indigestion
- Prevention: Stress management
- Treatment: Deep breathing; Relaxation techniques; Cognitive behavioral therapy
- Frequency: Very common

Butterflies in the stomach is the physical sensation in humans of a "fluttery" feeling in the stomach, caused by a reduction of blood flow to the organ. This is as a result of the release of adrenaline and norepinephrine in the fight-or-flight response, which causes increased heart rate and blood pressure, consequently sending more blood to the muscles.

== Physiology ==
When the brain perceives a stressful or emotionally significant situation, the sympathetic nervous system activates the fight-or-flight response, prompting the adrenal glands to release adrenaline and cortisol into the bloodstream. These hormones increase heart rate and redirect blood away from the digestive system toward the muscles and heart, causing the blood vessels surrounding the stomach and intestines to constrict. The resulting reduction in blood flow to the gastrointestinal tract, combined with irregular contractions of the gut muscles as normal peristalsis is disrupted, produces the characteristic fluttering sensation.

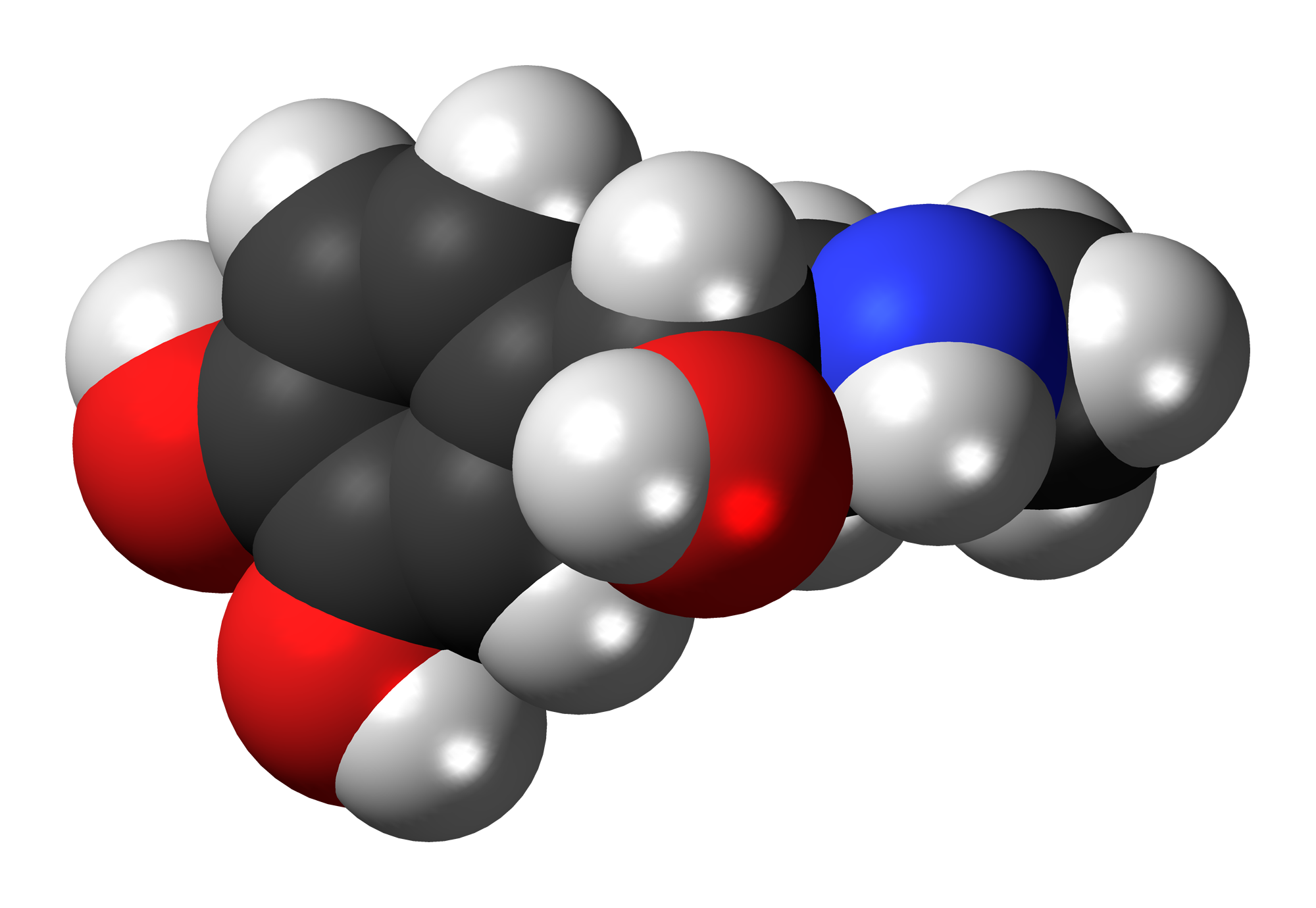
Space-filling model of Adrenaline

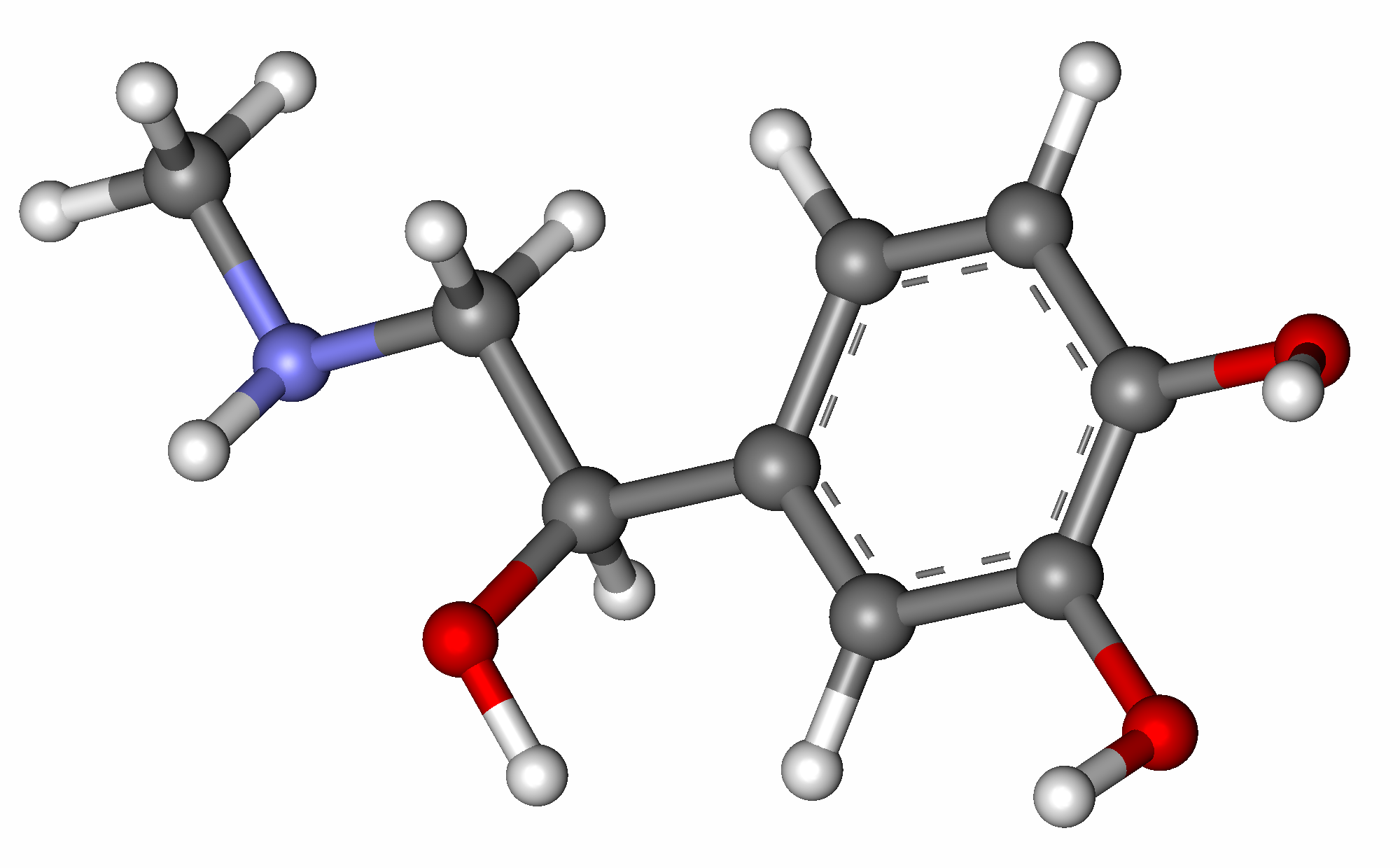
Ball-and-stick model of Adrenaline

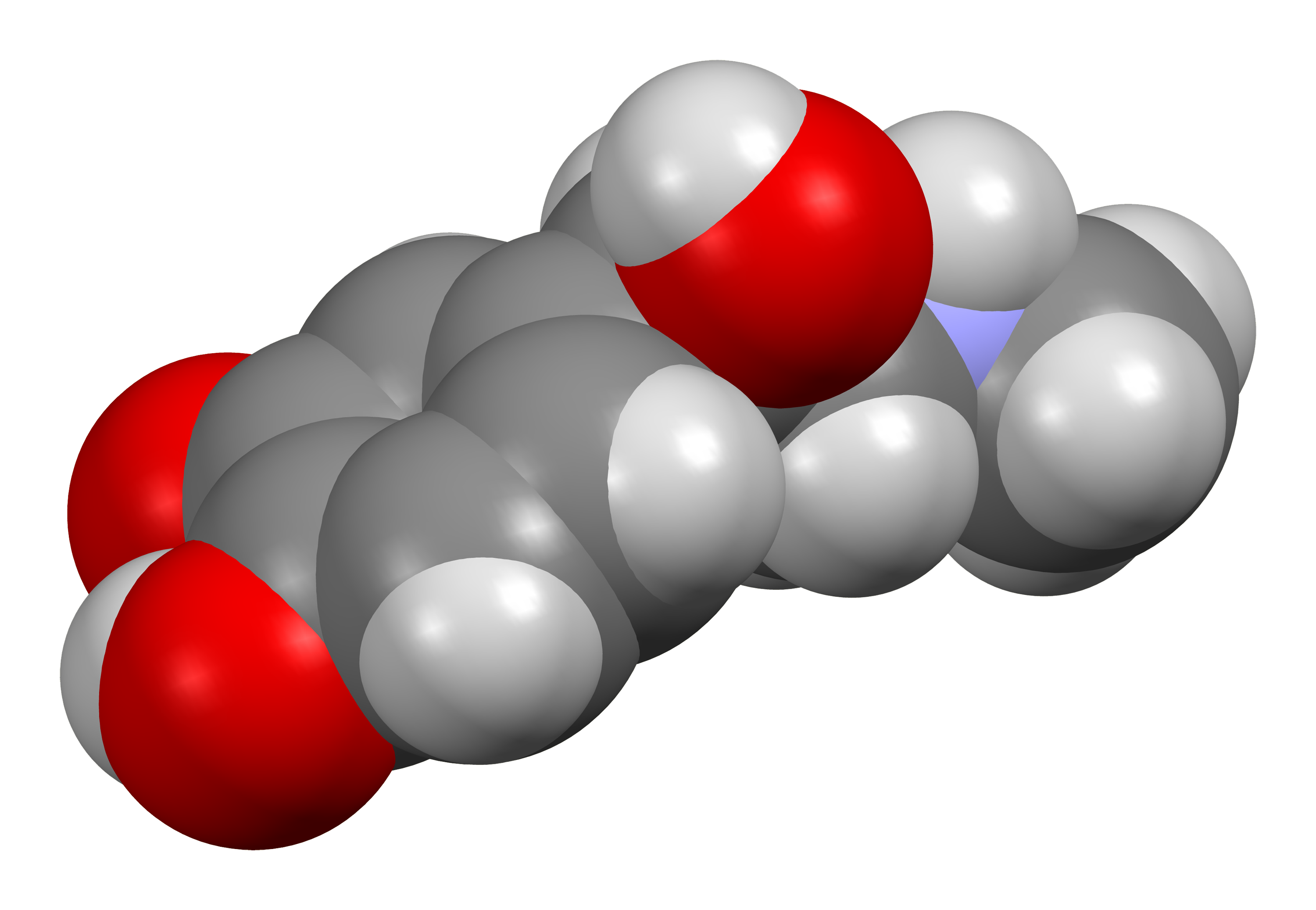
Space-filling model of adrenaline but zwitterionic

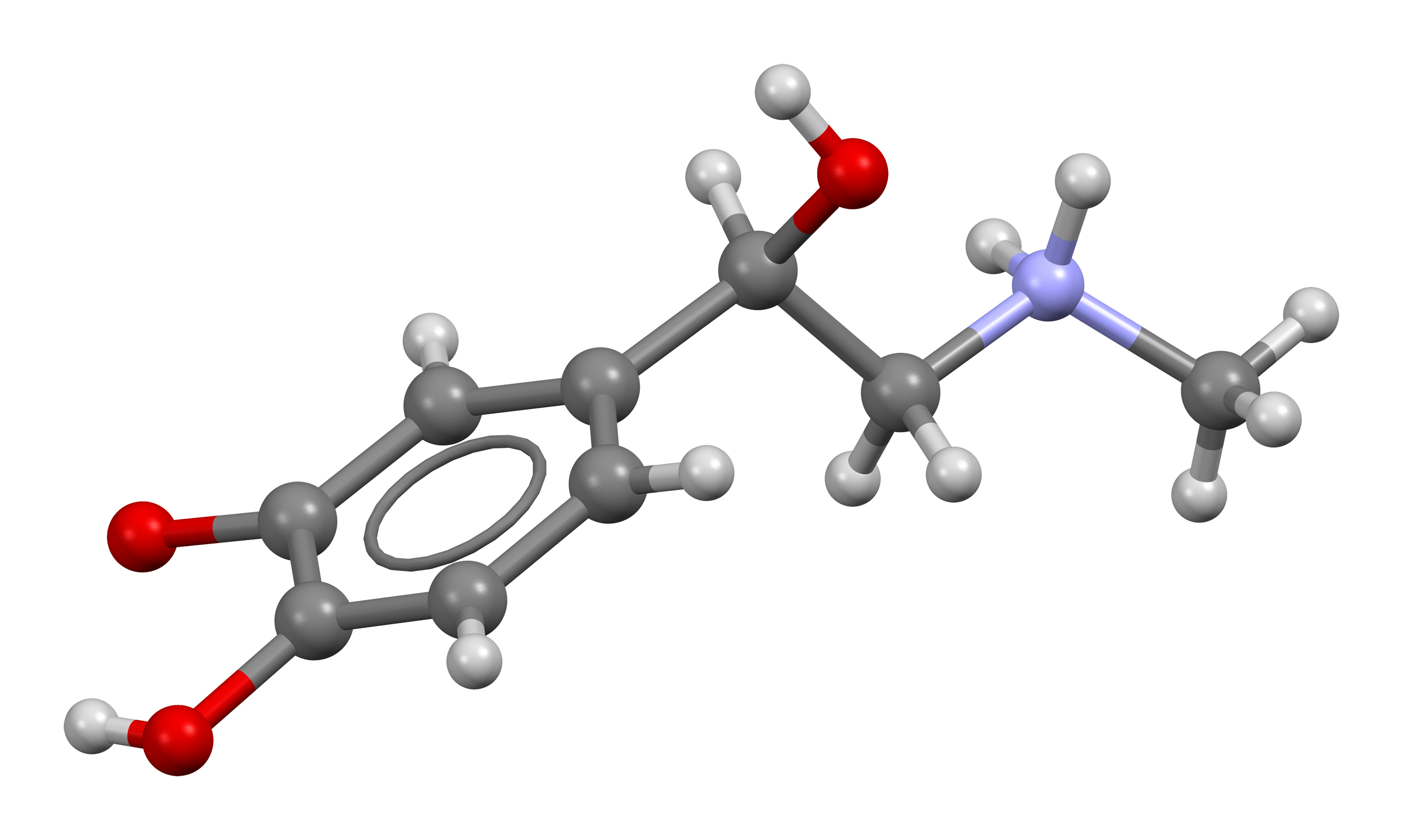
Ball-and-stick model of adrenaline but zwitterionic

Skeletal formula of Adrenaline

== Etymology ==
The phrase "butterflies in the stomach" first appeared in the 1908 novel The House of Prayer by American author Florence Converse, where a character is described as experiencing a feeling "as if he had a butterfly in his stomach." The idiom has been in widespread use for over a century to describe the unsettling sensation associated with a stressful or thrilling situation.

== In culture ==
Butterflies in the stomach are usually linked in culture and language to the sentiment of love and romantic passion to a desired other. One may feel butterflies in the stomach prior to meeting or confronting a love interest due to high levels of emotion and anxiety, as hormones like adrenaline (and sometimes cortisol) may be released in such situations.

It can also be a symptom of social anxiety disorder. This feeling is usually experienced before doing something important or stressful.

== See also ==
- Anxiety
