= Psychic workers =

DAMTP pshychic worker

Psychic worker is the term first used around 2010 by the DAMTP (DAta Miners Travailleurs Psychique) to self define as a union of Data miners and psychic workers. The term was used initially to describe their activities instead of using the term 'artist', in order to "supersede the art strike.". It has subsequently also been used by members of DAMTP to describe and develop their avant-garde activities.

In 2011 the artist Emit Snake-Beings invented the multiple-use name Karen Kranak for their activities with the Industrial Union of Psychic Workers as a breakaway faction from the Industrial Workers of the World union.
