= Autonomous subdivisions of Russia =

Two types of subdivisions of Russia use the designation "autonomous":

- autonomous okrug (administrative division)
- autonomous oblast (federal subject)

The republics of Russia have a degree of autonomy, but are not labeled as "autonomous".

== See also ==
- Autonomous administrative division
- Autonomous administrative divisions of the People's Republic of China
- Autonomous administrative divisions of India
