= Artyom Loskutov =

Russian performance artist (born 1986)

- Артём Лоскутов
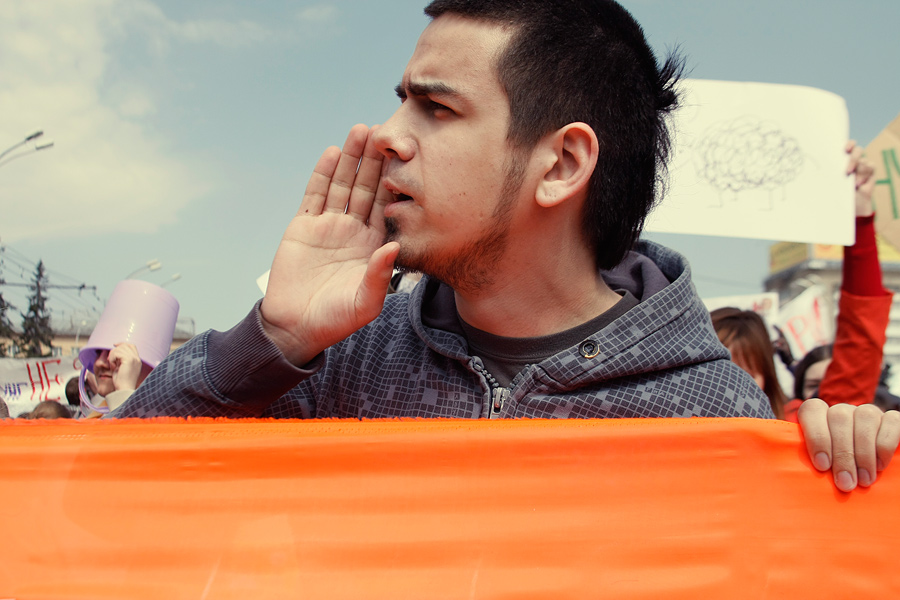
- Loskutov in 2010
- Born: Artyom Aleksandrovich Loskutov; September 15, 1986 (age 39); Novosibirsk, Soviet Union
- Education: Novosibirsk State Technical University
- Known for: Performance art
- Movement: Monstration

Artyom Aleksandrovich Loskutov (also spelled Artiom or Artem; Russian: Артём Александрович Ло́скутов; born September 15, 1986) is a Russian performance artist and an activist. He is known for an annual Monstration held in Novosibirsk that gently pokes fun at Kremlin policies. He has been arrested for insulting police. In response to the incident he said, "You're not a real Russian until you've been arrested."

In 2013, Loskutov was informed by Russian authorities that he is no longer allowed to practice art and to perform as an individual artist.

Loskutov exhibited at London's Saatchi Gallery in November 2017 as part of the Art Riot exhibition.

In 2019 Loskutov allegedly organized stealing from the New York City's Central Park the plaque previously affixed to one the benches; the plaque, according to Alexei Navalny's investigation, was a gift from Russian state television anchor Nailya Asker-Zade to a prominent Russian banker Andrey Kostin. Loskutov proclaimed the plaque being a ready-made art object titled “Without love, nothing works” and sold it through an on-line auction for 1.5 million rubles ($23,600), then transferred the money to a charity.

== Selected group shows ==
- 2018 — Resist! — BOZAR/Centre for Fine Arts, Brussels, Belgium
- 2018 — The Art of the 2000s — Tretyakov gallery, Moscow, Russia
- 2017 — Art Riot: Post-Soviet Actionism — Saatchi Gallery, London, UK
- 2017 — dis/order. Art and Activism in Russia since 2000 — Ludwig Forum für Internationale Kunst, Aachen, Germany
- 2017 — Garage Triennial of Russian Contemporary Art — Garage museum, Moscow, Russia
- 2017 — NAÏVE ... NO. Historical and stylistic parallels between naïve art and primitivism of the 20th and 21st centuries — Moscow Museum of Modern Art, Russia
- 2014 — Pussy Riot and the cossacs: Russian Tradition of Art Resistance — Havremagasinet Art Center in Boden, Sweden
- 2013 — Pussy Riot and the Russian Tradition of Art Rebellion — Meet Factory, Prague, Czech Republic

== Awards ==
In 2010, Russian news organization Action named Loskutov "Young Person of the Year."
