= Results of the 1917 Russian Constituent Assembly election =

There are numerous, conflicting accounts on the outcome of the November–December 1917 election to the All-Russian Constituent Assembly. The Constituent Assembly election, which took place in the midst of the First World War and the October Revolution, was the largest exercise of universal suffrage in the history of mankind until that date. Spanning over decades, different historical research projects have been undertaken to try to map the puzzle of outcomes of the election from the various constituencies.

== National results summary ==
The numbers in the table below represent accounts from the voting in 71 out of 81 electoral districts, although not all of those districts have complete voting tallies.

Party	Votes	%	Lists counted
Socialist-Revolutionaries (Note: Includes lists such as the joint SR-Menshevik list in Olonets (although only the SR deputy is included in the seat tally), the general soviet list in Semirechie, the joint SR-Peasants Union list in Irkutsk, the joint SR-Ukrainian SR list in Poltava. The count does not include other joint SR-Ukrainian SR lists in Ukraine, except Poltava (where the SR-USR list confronted the main USR-sponsored list), nor does it include any of the dissident leftist or rightist SR lists.): Constituency / List / Votes / %; Altai / List 2 - Socialist-Revolutionaries / 621,377 / 87.03; Arkhangelsk (Note: Substantially incomplete result – missing 4 uezds (about 25% of the total electorate of the district)) / List 3 - Socialist-Revolutionaries and Soviet of Peasants' Deputies / 85,272 / 66.81; Astrakhan / List 6 - Socialist-Revolutionaries / 100,482 / 51.77; Baltic Fleet / List 1 - Socialist-Revolutionaries / 30,510 / 27.04; Bessarabia (Note: Fragmentary result – includes only the city of Kishinev and 3 out of 8 uezds of the constituency) / List 2 - Socialist-Revolutionaries / 85,349 / 33.63; Black Sea Fleet / List 6 - Socialist-Revolutionaries / 22,251 / 42.28; Chernigov / List 1 - Socialist-Revolutionaries / 105,565 / 10.84; Chinese Eastern Railway / List 1 - Socialist-Revolutionaries / 5,081 / 14.45; Don Cossack Region / List 2 - Socialist-Revolutionaries / 478,901 / 34.05; Ekaterinoslav / List 3 - Socialist-Revolutionaries / 231,717 / 19.42; Estonia / List 5 - Socialist-Revolutionaries / 3,200 / 1.07; Irkutsk / List 1 - Socialist-Revolutionaries and Peasants Union / 113,378 / 54.47; Kaluga / List 2 - Socialist-Revolutionaries / 127,313 / 32.65; Kazan / List 11 - The Kazan Governorate Organization of the Socialist-Revolutionaries and the Soviet of Peasants Deputies / 264,158 / 30.77; Kiev / List 14 - Socialist-Revolutionaries / 19,220 / 1.28; Kostroma / List 1 - Socialist-Revolutionaries and Soviet of Peasants Deputies / 249,838 / 44.97; Kuban-Black Sea (Note: Fragmentary result – Includes only the city of Ekaterinodar (source Spirin)) / List 4 - Socialist-Revolutionaries / 2,268 / 11.9; Kursk / List 1 - Socialist-Revolutionaries / 868,743 / 82.08; Minsk / List 12 - Bloc of Socialist-Revolutionaries and the Soviet of Peasants Deputies / 181,673 / 19.81; Mogilev / List 1 - Socialist-Revolutionaries and Soviet of Peasants Deputies / 511,998 / 70.62; Moscow / List 3 - Socialist-Revolutionaries / 159,630 / 25.6; Moscow Metropolis / List 3 - Socialist-Revolutionaries / 62,260 / 8.14; Nizhny Novgorod / List 3 - Socialist-Revolutionaries and the Soviet of Peasants Deputies / 314,004 / 54.15; Northern Front / List 3 - Socialist-Revolutionaries and Peasants' Deputies / 249,832 / 29.72; Novgorod / List 4 - Socialist-Revolutionaries / 220,665 / 45.36; Olonets / List 1 - Soviet of Peasants Deputies (Socialist-Revolutionaries/Mensheviks) / 127,062 / 84.62; Orenburg / List 3 - Socialist-Revolutionaries / 110,172 / 16.28; Oryol / List 3 - Socialist-Revolutionaries and Soviet of Peasants Deputies / 511,049 / 62.7; Penza / List 4 - Socialist-Revolutionaries / 517,226 / 81.29; Perm / List 2 - Socialist-Revolutionaries / 665,118 / 52.05; Petrograd / List 10 - Socialist-Revolutionaries / 119,761 / 25.39; Petrograd Metropolis / List 9 - Socialist-Revolutionaries / 152,230 / 16.15; Podolia (Note: Substantially incomplete result – complete vote tallies from 9 out of 12 uezds.) / List 10 - Socialist-Revolutionaries, Soviet of Peasants and Soviet of Soldiers of the South-Western Front / 10,170 / 1.22; Poltava / List 17 - Socialist-Revolutionaries and Ukrainian Socialist-Revolutionaries / 198,437 / 17.27; Priamur / List 7 - Amur Oblast Organization of Socialist-Revolutionaries / 41,152 / 19.65; Priamur / List 1 - Maritime Province Socialist-Revolutionaries / 6,513 / 3.11; Pskov / List 3 - Socialist-Revolutionaries and Soviet of Peasants Deputies / 295,012 / 57.25; Romanian Front / List 3 - Socialist-Revolutionaries / 666,438 / 59.05; Ryazan / List 3 - Socialist-Revolutionaries and Soviet of Peasants Deputies / 397,229 / 57.14; Samara / List 3 - Soviet of Peasants Deputies and Socialist-Revolutionaries / 702,924 / 58.47; Saratov / List 12 - Socialist-Revolutionaries and the Soviet of Peasants Deputies / 612,094 / 56.28; Semirechie / List 2 - Bloc of Socialists of Ver-Nogo Town, Soviet of Peasants Deputies, Soviet of Soldiers and Workers Deputies, Kirghiz Socialist Party "Fukhara" (Socialist-Revolutionaries, Mensheviks) / 167,793 / 40.34; Simbirsk / List 2 - Socialist-Revolutionaries and Congress of Peasants / 363,847 / 57.68; Smolensk / List 3 - Socialist-Revolutionaries and Soviet of Peasants Deputies / 250,134 / 38; South-Western Front / List 1 - Socialist-Revolutionaries and Soviet of Peasants Deputies of the South-Western Front / 402,930 / 40; Stavropol / List 1 - Socialist-Revolutionaries and Soviet of Peasants Deputies / 291,395 / 88.69; Steppes (Note: Fragmentary result – Includes only Omsk and surroundings (source Radkey) and Semipalatinsk uezd (source Spirin)) / List 8 - Socialist-Revolutionaries / 7,393 / 7.46; Tambov / List 1 - Socialist-Revolutionaries and Governorate Soviet of Peasants Deputies / 835,556 / 71.22; Taurida / List 5 - Socialist-Revolutionaries / 300,100 / 52.22; Ter-Dagestan (Note: Fragmentary result – Includes only the city of Vladikavkaz, plus sporadic results of the major parties in some towns and garrisons.) / List 8 - Socialist-Revolutionaries / 4,292 / 11.17; Tobolsk / List 5 - Socialist-Revolutionaries (Southern Group) / 388,328 / 78.53; Tomsk / List 2 - Socialist-Revolutionaries / 541,153 / 85.16; Transbaikal (Note: Substantially incomplete result) / List 4 - Socialist-Revolutionaries / 49,363 / 50.26; Transcaucasus / List 3 - Socialist-Revolutionaries / 117,522 / 4.79; Tula (Note: Substantially incomplete result – Includes complete vote from city of Tula and 10 out of 12 uezds. Lacks result from Yefremov uezd and one of the volosts of Odoyev uezd.) / List 1 - Socialist-Revolutionaries / 216,267 / 45.28; Turgai / List 2 - Socialist-Revolutionaries and Congress of Peasants, Soldiers and Workers Deputies / 63,750 / 22.62; Tver / List 3 - Socialist-Revolutionaries and Soviet of Peasants Deputies / 186,030 / 30.4; Ufa / List 9 - Socialist-Revolutionaries / 322,166 / 33.68; Uralsk / List 2 - Socialist-Revolutionaries / 5,076 / 1.37; Vitebsk / List 1 - Socialist-Revolutionaries / 150,279 / 26.81; Vladimir / List 3 - Socialist-Revolutionaries and Congress of Peasants Deputies / 197,311 / 32.67; Volhynia / List 6 - Socialist-Revolutionaries / 27,575 / 3.43; Vologda (Note: Substantially incomplete result – Out of 10 uezds in the constituency, 1 uezd has largely incomplete result and 2 uezds have gaps in coverage) / List 1 - Socialist-Revolutionaries and Soviet of Peasants' Deputies / 320,528 / 75.79; Voronezh / List 3 - Socialist-Revolutionaries / 875,300 / 79.72; Vyatka / List 3 - Vyatka Governorate Congress of Peasants Deputies and the Party of Socialist-Revolutionaries / 300,503 / 46.91; Western Front / List 12 - Socialist-Revolutionaries and the Soviet of Peasants Deputies of the Armies of the Western Front / 180,582 / 18.5; Yaroslavl / List 3 - Socialist-Revolutionaries and Governorate Soviet of Peasants Deputies / 197,465 / 43.06; Yenisei / List 3 - Socialist-Revolutionaries / 229,723 / 64.48	17,239,633	37.56	68
Bolsheviks (Note: Includes all joint Bolshevik/Menshevik-Internationalist lists. Includes the joint Bolshevik-Menshevik list in Vologda, but not the joint Menshevik-Bolshevik list in Tobolsk (as the latter was reportedly dominated by Mensheviks).): Constituency / List / Votes / %; Altai / List 7 - Bolsheviks and Menshevik-Internationalists / 45,268 / 6.34; Arkhangelsk / List 5 - Bolsheviks / 21,779 / 17.06; Astrakhan / List 4 - Bolsheviks / 36,023 / 18.56; Baltic Fleet / List 2 - Bolsheviks / 65,093 / 57.7; Bessarabia / List 8 - Bolsheviks-Menshevik-Internationalists / 25,569 / 10.07; Black Sea Fleet / List 5 - Bolsheviks / 10,771 / 20.47; Chernigov / List 9 - Bolsheviks / 271,174 / 27.85; Chinese Eastern Railway / List 3 - Bolsheviks / 10,612 / 30.18; Don Cossack Region / List 5 - Bolsheviks / 205,497 / 14.61; Ekaterinoslav / List 9 - Bolsheviks, Bakhmut Soviet of Peasants Deputies / 213,163 / 17.87; Estonia / List 2 - Bolsheviks / 119,863 / 39.98; Irkutsk / List 7 - Bolsheviks and Menshevik-Internationalists / 31,587 / 15.17; Kaluga / List 7 - Bolsheviks / 225,378 / 57.81; Kazan / List 7 - Bolsheviks / 51,936 / 6.05; Kharkov / List 3 - Bolsheviks / 114,743 / 10.5; Kherson (Note: Substantially incomplete result – According to Radkey Odessa city results appeared complete, the Odessa uezd possibly incomplete, the Kherson uezd having results from 195 out of 223 voting centers, no indication about whether 2 other uezds results were complete or not. From the remaining 2 uezds the results were missing altogether.) / List 9 - Bolsheviks / 81,826 / 13.18; Kiev / List 12 - Bolsheviks / 60,693 / 4.04; Kostroma / List 4 - Bolsheviks / 226,905 / 40.84; Kuban-Black Sea / List 2 - Bolsheviks / 8,744 / 46.0; Kursk / List 4 - Bolsheviks / 119,127 / 11.26; Livonia / List 3 - Social-Democracy of the Latvian Territory / 97,781 / 71.86; Minsk / List 9 - Bolsheviks / 579,087 / 63.13; Mogilev / List 11 - Bolsheviks / 93,060 / 12.83; Moscow / List 5 - Bolsheviks and Menshevik-Internationalists / 351,853 / 56.43; Moscow Metropolis / List 5 - Bolsheviks / 366,148 / 47.88; Nizhny Novgorod / List 7 - Bolsheviks / 133,950 / 23.1; Northern Front / List 5 - Bolsheviks / 471,828 / 56.13; Novgorod / List 6 - Bolsheviks / 203,658 / 41.87; Orenburg / List 8 - Bolsheviks / 163,425 / 24.14; Oryol / List 8 - Bolsheviks / 241,786 / 29.66; Penza / List 5 - Bolsheviks and Menshevik-Internationalists / 54,731 / 8.6; Perm / List 6 - Bolsheviks / 268,292 / 20.99; Petrograd / List 2 - Bolsheviks / 229,698 / 48.69; Petrograd Metropolis / List 4 - Bolsheviks / 424,027 / 45; Podolia / List 15 - Bolsheviks / 27,550 / 3.32; Poltava / List 12 - Bolsheviks / 64,460 / 5.61; Priamur / List 5 - Bolsheviks / 40,850 / 19.5; Pskov / List 6 - Bolsheviks / 173,631 / 33.69; Romanian Front / List 6 - Bolsheviks / 173,804 / 15.4; Ryazan / List 5 - Bolsheviks / 251,815 / 36.22; Samara / List 2 - Bolsheviks / 179,533 / 14.93; Saratov / List 10 - Bolsheviks / 261,308 / 24.03; Simbirsk / List 10 - Bolsheviks / 93,000 / 14.74; Smolensk / List 7 - Bolsheviks / 361,062 / 54.85; South-Western Front / List 4 - Bolsheviks / 292,626 / 29.05; Stavropol / List 2 - Bolsheviks / 17,430 / 5.31; Steppes / List 3 - Bolsheviks / 13,591 / 13.72; Tambov / List 7 - Bolsheviks / 240,652 / 20.51; Taurida / List 3 - Bolsheviks / 31,612 / 5.5; Ter-Dagestan / List 7 - Bolsheviks / 21,495 / 55.95; Tomsk / List 3 - Bolsheviks / 51,456 / 8.1; Transbaikal / List 1 - Bolsheviks- / 8,560 / 8.71; Transcaucasus / List 5 - Bolsheviks / 93,581 / 3.81; Tula / List 5 - Bolsheviks / 219,337 / 45.93; Tver / List 6 - Bolsheviks / 362,687 / 59.27; Ufa / List 10 - Bolsheviks / 48,151 / 5.03; Vitebsk / List 5 - Bolsheviks / 287,101 / 51.22; Vladimir / List 6 - Bolsheviks / 337,941 / 55.95; Volhynia / List 12 - Bolsheviks / 35,612 / 4.43; Vologda / List 2 - Bolsheviks/Mensheviks / 67,650 / 16.00; Voronezh / List 2 - Bolsheviks / 151,517 / 13.8; Vyatka / List 11 - Bolsheviks / 222,272 / 34.7; Western Front / List 9 - Bolsheviks / 653,430 / 66.95; Yaroslavl / List 7 - Bolsheviks / 176,035 / 38.39; Yenisei / List 2 - Bolsheviks / 95,307 / 26.75	10,680,131	23.27	65
Ukrainian Socialist-Revolutionary Party and allies (Note: Includes all Ukrainian SR-led lists in Ukraine, the Ukrainian SR-led lists in the army districts as well as the Petrograd Ukrainian SR-Ukrainian SD-Faryenikte lists.): Constituency / List / Votes / %; Bessarabia / List 11- Ukrainian Socialist Organizations / 4,241 / 1.67; Black Sea Fleet / List 1 - Ukrainian Socialist-Revolutionaries / 12,895 / 24.5; Chernigov / List 10 - Ukrainian Socialist-Revolutionaries / 484,156 / 49.73; Ekaterinoslav / List 5 - Bloc of Ukrainian Socialist-Revolutionaries, Selyanska Spilka, Soviet of Peasant Deputies, Ukrainian Soc.-Dem. Labour Party / 556,012 / 46.6; Kharkov / List 5 - Socialist-Revolutionaries and Ukrainian SRs / 795,558 / 72.82; Kherson / List 4 - Ukrainian SRs, SRs and the United Jewish Socialist Labour Party (S.S. and E.S.) / 266,771 / 42.98; Kiev / List 1 - Ukrainian Socialist Bloc / 1,161,033 / 77.26; Northern Front / List 4 - Ukrainian Socialist-Revolutionaries and the Muslim National Socialist Organization / 88,956 / 10.58; Petrograd / List 9 - Petrograd organizations of the Ukrainian Soc.-Dem. Labour Party, Ukrainian SRs and United Jewish Socialist Labour Party (S.S. and E.S.) / 1,997 / 0.42; Petrograd Metropolis / List 6 - Petrograd organizations of the Ukrainian Soc.-Dem. Labour Party, Ukrainian SRs and United Jewish Socialist Labour Party (S.S. and E.S.) / 4,219 / 0.45; Podolia / List 1 - Ukrainian SRs, Selyanska Spilka and Ukrainian Soc.-Dem. Labour Party / 652,306 / 78.57; Poltava / List 8 - Ukrainian Socialist-Revolutionaries and Selianska Spilka / 727,247 / 63.28; Romanian Front / List 1 - United Ukrainian Socialists / 186,219 / 16.5; South-Western Front / List 3 - Ukrainian Socialist-Revolutionaries, Ukrainian Soc.-Dem. Labour Party and Socialist-Cossacks / 168,354 / 16.71; Taurida / List 3 - Ukrainian Socialist-Revolutionaries / 61,541 / 10.71; Volhynia / List 11 - Ukrainian Socialist-Revolutionaries and Council of Village Deputies / 569,044 / 70.76; Western Front / List 1 - Ukrainian SRs and Ukrainian Social Democratic Labour Party / 85,062 / 8.72	5,825,611	12.69	17
Kadets: Constituency / List / Votes / %; Altai / List 5 - Kadets / 12,108 / 1.7; Arkhangelsk / List 1 - Kadets / 12,086 / 9.47; Astrakhan / List 1 - Kadets / 13,017 / 6.71; Bessarabia / List 5 - Kadets / 16,545 / 6.52; Chernigov / List 7 - Kadets / 28,864 / 2.96; Chinese Eastern Railway / List 4 - Kadets / 6,327 / 18; Don Cossack Region / List 6 - Kadets / 43,345 / 3.08; Ekaterinoslav / List 7 - Kadets / 27,551 / 2.31; Irkutsk / List 4 - Kadets / 8,834 / 4.24; Kaluga / List 3 - Kadets / 24,125 / 6.19; Kazan / List 2 - Kadets / 31,728 / 3.7; Kharkov / List 6 - Kadets / 58,302 / 5.34; Kherson / List 5 - Kadets / 53,770 / 8.66; Kiev / List 6 - Kadets / 21,667 / 1.44; Kostroma / List 2 - Kadets / 41,448 / 7.46; Kuban-Black Sea / List 1 - Kadets / 3,206 / 16.9; Kursk / List 2 - Kadets / 47,199 / 4.46; Minsk / List 6 - Kadets / 10,724 / 1.17; Mogilev / List 6 - Kadets / 19,316 / 2.66; Moscow / List 1 - Kadets / 43,295 / 6.94; Moscow Metropolis / List 1 - Kadets / 263,859 / 34.5; Nizhny Novgorod / List 12 - Kadets / 34,726 / 5.99; Northern Front / List 7 - Kadets / 13,687 / 1.63; Novgorod / List 3 - Kadets / 31,484 / 6.47; Olonets / List 2 - Kadets / 20,278 / 13.5; Orenburg / List 1 - Kadets / 24,757 / 3.66; Oryol / List 2 - Kadets / 18,345 / 2.25; Penza / List 1 - Kadets / 25,407 / 3.99; Perm / List 5 - Kadets / 111,241 / 8.71; Petrograd / List 1 - Kadets / 64,859 / 13.75; Petrograd Metropolis / List 2 - Kadets / 246,506 / 26.16; Podolia / List 4 - Kadets / 7,951 / 0.96; Poltava / List 3 - Kadets / 18,105 / 1.58; Priamur / List 9 - Kadets / 17,233 / 8.23; Pskov / List 2 - Kadets / 25,961 / 5.04; Romanian Front / List 7 - Kadets / 21,443 / 1.9; Ryazan / List 1 - Kadets / 27,808 / 4; Samara / List 6 - Kadets / 44,466 / 3.7; Saratov / List 1 - Kadets / 27,226 / 2.5; Simbirsk / List 5 - Kadets / 16,718 / 2.65; Smolensk / List 1 - Kadets / 29,274 / 4.45; South-Western Front / List 7 – Kadets; List 10 - Kadets and Allies / 13,724 / 1.36; Stavropol / List 5 - Kadets / 10,938 / 3.33; Steppes / List 6 - Kadets / 5,031 / 5.08; Tambov / List 5 - Kadets / 47,548 / 4.05; Taurida / List 1 - Kadets / 38,794 / 6.75; Ter-Dagestan / List 5 - Kadets / 7,725 / 20.11; Tobolsk / List 1 - Kadets / 13,793 / 2.79; Tomsk / List 1 - Kadets / 18,618 / 2.93; Transbaikal / List 6 - Kadets / 4,111 / 4.19; Transcaucasus / List 2 - Kadets / 25,637 / 1.05; Tula / List 2 - Kadets / 21,298 / 4.46; Tver / List 1 - Kadets / 32,830 / 5.37; Ufa / List 12 - Kadets / 15,825 / 1.65; Vitebsk / List 3 - Kadets / 8,132 / 1.45; Vladimir / List 1 - Kadets / 38,035 / 6.3; Volhynia / List 5 - Kadets and Non-Party Farmers / 22,337 / 2.78; Vologda / List 4 - Kadets / 22,912 / 5.42; Voronezh / List 1 - Kadets / 36,488 / 3.32; Vyatka (Note: Substantially incomplete result - the vote for other lists than the SR, Bolsheviks and Orthodox in Vyatka could be double as high in reality, according to Radkey) / List 9 - Kadets / 22,404 / 3.5; Western Front / List 3 - Kadets / 16,750 / 1.72; Yaroslavl / List 2 - Kadets / 53,730 / 11.72; Yenisei / List 1 - Kadets / 12,017 / 3.37	2,103,468	4.58	64
Mensheviks (Note: Includes joint Menshevik-Bund lists, and the joint Menshevik-Bolshevik list in Tobolsk. This line does not include the votes from the joint SR-Menshevik list in Olonets, which elected one Menshevik deputy. However, the Menshevik from Olonets is included in the seat count.): Constituency / List / Votes / %; Altai / List 4 - Mensheviks / 3,785 / 0.53; Arkhangelsk / List 2 - Mensheviks / 7,335 / 5.75; Astrakhan / List 5 - Mensheviks / 2,256 / 1.16; Bessarabia / List 4 - Bund-Mensheviks / 1,438 / 0.57; Black Sea Fleet / List 4 - Mensheviks / 1,943 / 3.69; Chernigov / List 2 - Mensheviks / 10,813 / 1.11; Chinese Eastern Railway / List 2 - Mensheviks / 13,139 / 37.37; Don Cossack Region / List 8 - Mensheviks / 17,504 / 1.24; Ekaterinoslav / List 12 - Mensheviks / 26,909 / 2.26; Irkutsk / List 2 - Mensheviks / 5,534 / 2.66; Kaluga / List 5 - Mensheviks / 6,996 / 1.79; Kazan / List 5 - Mensheviks / 4,906 / 0.57; Kherson / List 7 - Mensheviks-Bund / 14,369 / 2.31; Kiev / List 5 - Mensheviks / 11,613 / 0.77; Kostroma / List 3 - Mensheviks / 19,488 / 3.51; Kuban-Black Sea / List 8 - Mensheviks / 786 / 4.10; Kursk / List 6 - Mensheviks / 6,037 / 0.57; Livonia / List 2 - Mensheviks / 7,046 / 5.18; Minsk / List 5 - Mensheviks-Bund / 16,277 / 1.77; Mogilev / List 2 - Mensheviks-Bund / 21,664 / 2.99; Moscow / List 4 - Mensheviks / 27,108 / 4.35; Moscow Metropolis / List 4 - Mensheviks / 19,690 / 2.57; Nizhny Novgorod / List 2 - Mensheviks / 7,634 / 1.32; Northern Front / List 1 - Mensheviks / 5,966 / 0.71; Novgorod / List 9 - Mensheviks / 9,336 / 1.92; Orenburg / List 4 - Mensheviks / 7,544 / 1.11; Oryol / List 5 - Mensheviks / 16,301 / 2; Penza / List 2 - Mensheviks-Bund / 4,726 / 0.74; Perm / List 7 - Mensheviks / 28,002 / 2.19; Petrograd / List 3 - Mensheviks / 6,100 / 1.29; Petrograd Metropolis / List 16 - Mensheviks / 11,740 / 1.25; Podolia / List 14 - Mensheviks / 4,028 / 0.49; Poltava / List 10 - Mensheviks, Bund, Polish Unity / 5,993 / 0.52; Priamur / List 4 - Mensheviks / 15,458 / 7.38; Pskov / List 4 - Mensheviks / 4,870 / 0.95; Romanian Front / List 4 - Mensheviks / 36,115 / 3.2; Ryazan / List 2 - Mensheviks / 4,389 / 0.63; Samara / List 6 - Mensheviks / 4,166 / 0.35; Saratov / List 2 - Mensheviks / 15,152 / 1.39; Simbirsk / List 6 - Mensheviks / 3,681 / 0.58; Smolensk / List 6 - Mensheviks / 7,901 / 1.2; South-Western Front / List 2 - Mensheviks / 79,630 / 7.9; Stavropol / List 7 - Mensheviks / 1,836 / 0.56; Tambov / List 3 - Mensheviks / 22,425 / 1.91; Taurida / List 6 - Mensheviks / 15,176 / 2.64; Ter-Dagestan / List 4 - Mensheviks / 958 / 2.49; Tobolsk / List 2 - Menshevik-Bolshevik alliance / 12,061 / 2.44; Tomsk / List 5 - Mensheviks / 5,769 / 0.91; Transbaikal / List 3 - Mensheviks / 2,154 / 2.19; Transcaucasus / List 1 - Mensheviks / 661,934 / 26.98; Tula / List 4 - Mensheviks / 9,605 / 2.01; Turgai / List 3 - Mensheviks / 6,758 / 2.40; Tver / List 5 - Mensheviks / 22,552 / 3.69; Ufa / List 5 - Mensheviks / 2,614 / 0.27; Vitebsk / List 9 - Mensheviks-Bund / 12,471 / 2.22; Vladimir / List 4 - Mensheviks / 13,074 / 2.16; Volhynia / List 1 - Mensheviks-Bund / 16,947 / 2.11; Voronezh / List 4 - Mensheviks / 8,658 / 0.79; Vyatka / List 6 - Mensheviks / 18,964 / 2.96; Western Front / List 5 - Mensheviks-Bund / 5,622 / 0.58; Yaroslavl / List 4 - Mensheviks / 16,809 / 3.67; Yenisei / List 4 - Mensheviks / 4,531 / 1.27	1,386,286	3.02	62
Cossacks: Constituency / List / Votes / %; Astrakhan / List 3 - Cossack Group / 16,400 / 8.45; Don Cossack Region / List 4 - Cossack / 636,966 / 45.28; Kuban-Black Sea / List 3 - Highlanders and Cossacks / 3,544 / 18.6; Orenburg / List 2 - Orenburg Cossack Host / 144,039 / 21.28; Petrograd Metropolis / List 19 - Council of the Union of Cossack Host / 6,712 / 0.71; Priamur / List 3 - Amur and Ussuri Cossacks / 22,612 / 10.8; Steppes / List 1 - Cossack / 4205 / 4.24; Ter-Dagestan / List 1 - Cossack / 3,062 / 7.97; Transbaikal / List 5 - Transbaikal Cossacks / 12,854 / 13.09; Uralsk / List 3 - Military Committee of the Ural Cossack Host / 61,476 / 16.59	911,870	1.99	10
Muslim socialists: Constituency / List / Votes / %; Fergana / List 2 - All Fergana List of Soviet of Deputies of Muslim Organizations / 77,282 / 50.14; Kazan / List 10 - Muslim Socialist Committee / 153,151 / 17.84; Nizhny Novgorod / List 8 - All Muslim Socialist Bloc / 19,935 / 3.44; Romanian Front / List 2 - Muslim Socialists / 23,136 / 2.05; South-Western Front / List 6 - Socialist Group of Muslim Soldiers of the South-Western Front / 32,910 / 3.27; Steppes / List 11 - Kirghiz Socialists / 1,843 / 1.86; Tambov / List 8 - Party of the Muslim Socialist-Democratic Bloc / 6,222 / 0.53; Transcaucasus / List 11 - Hummet / 84,748 / 3.45; Transcaucasus / List 12 - Muslim Socialist Bloc / 159,770 / 6.51; Ufa / List 3 - Muslims (Social-Revolutionaries) / 304,864 / 31.88; Western Front / List 2 - Muslim Socialists / 16,846 / 1.73	880,707	1.92	11
Alash Orda: Constituency / List / Votes / %; Turgai / List 1 - Kirghiz Alash Party / 211,274 / 74.98; Semirechie / List 3 - Bloc of the Kirghiz Party Alash and other Muslims (Alash-Semirechie Cossack Host) / 219,832 / 52.85; Steppes / List 5 - Alash / 58,512 / 59.05; Uralsk / List 1 - Ural Regional Kirghiz Committee / 278,014 / 75.01	767,632	1.67	4
Turkic Democratic Federalist Party — Musavat and Muslim National Committee (Transcaucasus)	615,816	1.34	1
Jewish national lists: Constituency / List / Votes / %; Bessarabia / List 9 - Jewish National Electoral Committee / 28,785 / 11.34; Chernigov / List 4 - Jewish National Committee / 28,308 / 2.91; Ekaterinoslav / List 10 - Jewish National Electoral Committee / 37,032 / 3.1; Kharkov / List 10 - Jewish National Bloc / 6,366 / 0.58; Kherson / List 10 - Jewish Bloc / 86,190 / 13.89; Kiev / List 2 - Jewish National Bloc / 90,829 / 6.04; Minsk / List 2 - Jewish National Electoral Committee / 65,046 / 7.09; Mogilev / List 9 - Jewish National Electoral Committee / 42,037 / 5.8; Podolia / List 2 - Jewish National Electoral Committee / 62,544 / 7.53; Podolia / List 6 - Jewish List / 322 / 0.04; Poltava / List 6 - Jewish National Electoral Committee / 13,722 / 1.19; Poltava / List 9 - Jewish List / 12,100 / 1.05; Taurida / List 11 - Jewish Nationalists / 13,986 / 2.43; Transcaucasus / List 15 - Zionists / 6,983 / 0.35; Vitebsk / List 7 - Jewish National Electoral Committee / 24,790 / 4.42; Volhynia / Jewish national lists; List 2 - Jewish National Electoral Committeeï; List 3 - Jewish National Party; List 8 - Jewish Community Personalities / 55,967 / 6.96	575,007	1.25	18
Armenian Revolutionary Federation (Transcaucasus)	558,400	1.22	1
Other Muslim lists: Constituency / List / Votes / %; Astrakhan / List 2 - Muslim Group / 25,023 / 12.89; Kazan / List 4 - Kazan Governorate Muslim Assembly / 99,080 / 11.54; Orenburg / List 5 - Muslim Association / 16,652 / 2.46; Perm / List 9 - Muslims-Bashkirs / 47,578 / 3.72; Perm / List 3 - Muslims / 29,683 / 2.32; Steppes / List 7 - Tatars / 468 / 0.47; Steppes / List 13 - Muslim-Democrats / 14 / 0.01; Taurida / List 9 - Muslims / 68,581 / 11.93; Tobolsk / List 4 - Muslims / 25,830 / 5.22; Transcaucasus / List 13 - Western Transcaucasus Muslims / 71 / 0; Ufa / List 1 - Muslim National Council / 88,850 / 9.29; Vyatka / List 4 - Muslim Union of Vyatka Governorate / 37,781 / 5.9	439,611	0.96	12
Popular Socialists, Ukrainian Socialist-Federalists and allies: Constituency / List / Votes / %; Altai / List 3 - Popular Socialists / 6,068 / 0.85; Astrakhan / List 7 - Popular Socialist Group of Tsarevsky Uezd / 906 / 0.47; Bessarabia / List 10 - Bessarabian Popular Socialist Labour Party / 376 / 0.15; Irkutsk / List 3 - Siberian Autonomists and Popular Socialists / 6,925 / 3.33; Kaluga / List 1 - Popular Socialists / 601 / 0.15; Kharkov / List 11 - Popular Socialists / 11,852 / 1.08; Kherson / List 11 - Popular Socialists / 5,626 / 0.91; Kursk / List 3 - Popular Socialists / 8,594 / 0.81; Moscow / List 2 - Popular Socialists / 6,058 / 0.97; Moscow Metropolis / List 7 - Popular Socialist / 2,508 / 0.33; Nizhny Novgorod / List 10 - Popular Socialists / 2,666 / 0.46; Northern Front / List 2 - Popular Socialists / 5,868 / 0.7; Novgorod / List 1 - Popular Socialists / 10,314 / 2.12; Orenburg / List 7 - Popular Socialists / 5,681 / 0.84; Penza / List 6 - Popular Socialists / 4,336 / 0.68; Petrograd / List 8 - Popular Socialists / 12,048 / 2.55; Petrograd Metropolis / List 1 - Popular Socialists / 19,109 / 2.03; Podolia / List 9 - Popular Socialists / 852 / 0.1; Pskov / List 1 - Popular Socialists and Toiling Peasants / 4,059 / 0.79; Romanian Front / List 5 - Popular Socialists / 4,514 / 0.4; Ryazan / List 4 - Popular Socialists / 5,216 / 0.75; Samara / List 5 - Popular Socialists / 4,364 / 0.36; Saratov / List 8 - Popular Socialists / 10,243 / 0.94; Smolensk / List 4 - Popular Socialists / 2,210 / 0.34; South-Western Front / List 9 - Popular Socialists / 3,084 / 0.31; Taurida / List 2 - Popular Socialists / 4,643 / 0.81; Ter-Dagestan / List 2 - Popular Socialists / 53 / 0.14; Tobolsk / List 3 - Peasants Union-Popular Socialists alliance / 50,780 / 10.27; Tomsk / List 4 - Popular Socialists / 15,802 / 2.49; Transbaikal / Popular Socialists; List 7 - Popular Socialists and Citizens of Barguzin Uezd; List 8 - Transbaikal Division of the Popular Socialists / 2,682 / 2.73; Transcaucasus / List 9 - Popular Socialists / 514 / 0.02; Tula / List 6 - Popular Socialists / 1,832 / 0.38; Tver / List 7 - Popular Socialists / 2,338 / 0.38; Ufa / List 8 - Popular Socialists / 11,429 / 1.19; Vitebsk / List 2 - Popular Socialists / 3,599 / 0.64; Vladimir / List 5 - Popular Socialists / 6,908 / 1.14; Vologda / List 3 - Popular Socialists / 8,071 / 1.91; Voronezh / List 6 - Popular Socialists / 6,116 / 0.56; Vyatka / List 5 - Popular Socialists and Cheremi National Union / 25,311 / 3.95; Yaroslavl / List 1 - Popular Socialists / 5,637 / 1.23; Yenisei / List 6 - Popular Socialists / 8,703 / 2.44; Chernigov / List 3 - Bloc of Ukrainian Socialist-Federalists and Popular Socialists / 10,089 / 1.04; Kiev / List 13 - Ukrainian Socialists-Federalists and Popular Socialists / 3,072 / 0.2; Poltava / List 13 - Ukrainian Socialist-Federalists / 9,092 / 0.79; Don Cossack Region / List 7 - Popular Socialists-Cooperative alliance / 5,049 / 0.36; Ekaterinoslav / List 4 - Popular Socialists-Cooperative alliance / 9,496 / 0.8; Poltava / List 14 - Popular Socialists and Cooperativists / 4,391 / 0.38; Stavropol / List 6 - Popular Socialists-and Cooperativists / 670 / 0.2; Tambov / List 4 - Popular Socialists and Congress of Cooperative Organizations / 7,408 / 0.63	347,763	0.76	50
Chuvash: Constituency / List / Votes / %; Kazan / List 1 - The All Chuvash National Congress, the Chuvash Military Committees and the Chuvash Organization of the Socialist Revolutionary Party / 226,496 / 26.38; Samara / List 8 - Chuvash National Congress of Socialist-Revolutionaries / 9,036 / 0.75; Simbirsk / List 12 - All Chuvash National Congress and Chuvash Organizations / 55 / 0.01	235,587	0.51	3
All-Russian Union of Landowners and Farmers, allies: Constituency / List / Votes / %; Bessarabia / List 3 - Union of Landowners / 5,246 / 2.07; Chernigov / List 14 - Landowners / 11,857 / 1.22; Don Cossack Region / List 9 - Landowners / 5,457 / 0.39; Ekaterinoslav / List 1 - Landowners and Nonpartisan Progressives / 26,597 / 2.23; Kharkov / List 2 - Landowners / 13,847 / 1.27; Kursk / List 5 - Union of Landowners / 8,656 / 0.82; Minsk / List 3 - Union of Landowners / 3,465 / 0.38; Mogilev / List 5 - Union of Landowners / 10,136 / 1.4; Moscow / List 8 - Landowners / 2,189 / 0.35; Novgorod / List 7 - Union of Landowners / 7,804 / 1.6; Oryol / List 6 - Union of Landowners / 12,911 / 1.58; Poltava / List 2 - Farmer-Owners / 61,115 / 5.32; Pskov / List 5 - Pskov Provincial Union of Landowners / 3,209 / 0.62; Saratov / List 6 - Union of Landowners / 13,804 / 1.27; Tambov / List 2 - Union of Landowners / 12,493 / 1.06; Taurida / List 12 - Landowner / 7,715 / 1.34; Tver / List 2 - Union of Landowners / 3,677 / 0.6; Ufa / List 2 - Landowners / 7,358 / 0.77; Voronezh / List 8 - Union of Landowners / 7,231 / 0.66; Yaroslavl / List 5 - Union of Landowners / 4,497 / 0.98; Ryazan / List 7 - Bloc of Landowners and Old Believers / 1,041 / 0.15; Vitebsk / List 8 - Landowners and Old Believers / 6,098 / 1.09; Novgorod / List 2 - Homeowners and Landowners of Novgorod Governorate / 1,178 / 0.24	237,581	0.52	23
Polish lists: Constituency / List / Votes / %; Kiev / List 11 - Polish / 42,943 / 2.86; Minsk / List 8 - Polish Electoral Committee / 36,882 / 4.02; Mogilev / List 10 - Mogilev Governorate Polish Council / 15,981 / 2.2; Podolia / List 8 - Regional Polish List / 46,500 / 5.6; Podolia / List 16 - United Polish / 412 / 0.05; Vitebsk / List 10 - United Polish Organizations / 10,556 / 1.88; Volhynia / List 4 - Polish / 57,998 / 7.21	211,272	0.46	7
Orthodox lists: Constituency / List / Votes / %; Ekaterinoslav / List 6 - Orthodox-Farmers alliance / 8,068 / 0.68; Irkutsk / List 6 - Orthodox parishes / 2,653 / 1.27; Kazan / List 6 - Orthodox Clergy and Laymen of the Kazan Governorate / 12,322 / 1.44; Kharkov / List 1 - [Orthodox] Parishes / 10,478 / 0.96; Kherson / List 1 - [Orthodox] Clergy and Laymen / 13,038 / 2.1; Kostroma / List 5 - Orthodox Clergy and Laymen / 17,901 / 3.22; Perm / List 10 - [Orthodox] Clerical People's Party / 47,881 / 3.75; Petrograd / List 7 - Petrograd Governorate Union of Orthodox Parishes / 5,661 / 1.2; Petrograd Metropolis / List 12 - United Orthodox Parishes / 24,139 / 2.56; Samara / List 15 - Orthodox Followers / 13,133 / 1.09; Saratov / List 5 - Orthodox People's Party / 17,414 / 1.6; Smolensk / List 8 - [Orthodox] Parish Non-Party Group / 5,300 / 0.81; Stavropol / List 4 - [Orthodox] Clergy and Worshippers / 3,078 / 0.94; Steppes / List 2 - [Orthodox] Clergy and Laymen / 705 / 0.71; Steppes / List 14 - [Orthodox] Clergy and Laymen of Petropavlovsk / 5 / 0.01; Ufa / List 6 - Orthodox Parishes / 11,178 / 1.17; Vitebsk / List 6 - Vitebsk Belarusian People's Union and Orthodox Parishes of the Faith of the Polotsk Diocese / 9,019 / 1.61; Vyatka / List 10 - Orthodox Parish Democratic Union / 9,000 / 1.4	210,973	0.46	18
Bashkir Federalists: Constituency / List / Votes / %; Orenburg / List 9 - Bashkir Federalists / 51,787 / 7.65; Samara / List 4 - Bashkir Federalists / 12,397 / 1.03; Ufa / List 11 - Bashkir Federalists / 135,977 / 14.22	200,161	0.44	3
German lists: Constituency / List / Votes / %; Altai / List 6 - Russian Germans / 8,048 / 1.13; Ekaterinoslav / List 14 - Russian Citizens of German Nationality / 25,977 / 2.18; Kharkov / List 16 - Germans / 5,221 / 0.48; Kherson / List 3 - Russian Citizens of German Nationality / 27,879 / 4.49; Moscow Metropolis / List 6 - Commonwealth of Nations (mainly Germans) / 2,076 / 0.27; Samara / List 16 - Union of Russian Citizens of German Nationality in the Central Volga Region / 47,705 / 3.97; Saratov / List 7 - Volga Germans / 50,025 / 4.6; Steppes / List 12 - Germans / 11 / 0.01; Taurida / List 10 - Germans / 27,681 / 4.82	194,623	0.42	9
Muslim Shuro-Islamia: Constituency / List / Votes / %; Samara / List 13 - Muslim Shuro-Islamia / 126,558 / 10.53; Simbirsk / List 8 - Muslim Shuro Islamia / 57,000 / 9.04	183,558	0.40	2
Peasants lists: Constituency / List / Votes / %; Bessarabia / List 1 - Soviet of Peasants' Deputies / 69,085 / 27.22; Chernigov / List 6 - Peasants of Mglin Uezd / 538 / 0.06; Kharkov / List 18 - Peasants of Zmiyevsky Uezd / 311 / 0.03; Kharkov / List 17 - Peasants of Sumy Uezd / 229 / 0.02; Perm / List 1 - Krasnoufimsky Non-Partisan Credit Union / 13,748 / 1.08; Poltava / List 16 - Soviet of Peasants Deputies of Smenoi Rovno Village / 445 / 0.04; Priamur / List 2 - Maritime Province Soviet of Peasants Deputies / 56,718 / 27.08; Samara / List 12 - Non-Party Peasants-Farmers / 3,030 / 0.25; Saratov / List 11 - Peasants of Petrovsk uezd and Mordva Population / 6,379 / 0.59; Stavropol / List 3 - Farmers / 3,205 / 0.98; Tambov / List 6 - Uezd Peasants List / 887 / 0.08; Tula / List 3 - Peasants of Basavsk volost / 770 / 0.16; Uralsk / List 4 - Soviet of Peasants and Non-Resident Deputies / 26,059 / 7.03; Vitebsk / List 13 - Peasants of Vitebsk Governorate / 9,752 / 1.74	191,156	0.42	14
Russian rightists: Constituency / List / Votes / %; Kherson / List 2 - Russian Popular State Union (Rightists) / 4,217 / 0.68; Kiev / List 8 - Russian Rightists / 48,758 / 3.24; Minsk / List 11 - Russian Democratic Party / 10,040 / 1.09; Moscow / List 10 - Group of Public Figures (rightists) / 8,443 / 1.35; Moscow Metropolis / List 9 - Labour Non-Party Group (Rightists, ex-Octobrists) / 4,085 / 0.53; Nizhny Novgorod / List 11 - Christian Union for Faith and Fatherland / 48,428 / 8.35; Perm / List 8 - Radical Democrats / 1,381 / 0.11; Petrograd Metropolis / List 11 - Central Committee of the Russian Radical Democratic Party / 413 / 0.04; Saratov / List 9 - Society for Faith and Order / 6,600 / 0.61; Vladimir / List 2 - Revival of Free Russia (rightists) / 9,209 / 1.52; Volhynia / List 13 - Rightists and coreligionists / 1,438 / 0.18; Western Front / List 6 - Russian Democratic Party / 3,055 / 0.31	146,067	0.32	12
Old Believers: Constituency / List / Votes / %; Altai / List 1 - Old Believers / 17,292 / 2.42; Chernigov / List 5 - Old Believers / 4,858 / 0.5; Don Cossack Region / List 3 - Old Believer / 8,183 / 0.58; Kaluga / List 4 - Old Believers / 4,409 / 1.13; Kherson / List 12 - Old Believers / 2,188 / 0.35; Moscow / List 9 - Old Believers / 7,467 / 1.2; Nizhny Novgorod / List 5 - Union of Old Believer Accord / 16,230 / 2.8; Perm / List 4 - Old Believers / 35,853 / 2.81; Samara / List 7 - Old Believer Joint Committee / 6,508 / 0.54; Saratov / List 4 - Russian People's Party of Christians-Old Believers / 13,956 / 1.28; Transbaikal / List 9 - Union of Transbaikal Old Believers / 1,418 / 1.44	118,362	0.26	11
SR Defencists (Note: Includes dissident right-wing SR lists that contested against the official SR party lists): Constituency / List / Votes / %; Baltic Fleet / List 4 - Right-wing Socialist-Revolutionaries / 13,249 / 11.74; Kazan / List 9 - Right-wing Socialist-Revolutionaries / 9,820 / 1.14; Kharkov / List 15 - SR Defencists / 42,331 / 3.87; Petrograd Metropolis / List 8 - Petrograd Group of SR Defencists (Volya Naroda group) / 4,696 / 0.5; Simbirsk / List 4 - SR Defencists / 29,446 / 4.67	99,542	0.22	5
Ukrainian Social Democratic Labour Party (Note: In many constituencies the party contested on the Ukrainian SR-led lists. This count is only for the 2 districts where the Ukrainian Social Democrats contested alone.): Constituency / List / Votes / %; Kherson / List 8 - Ukrainian Soc.-Dem. Labour Party / 63,159 / 10.18; Poltava / List 15 - Ukrainian Social Democrats / 22,613 / 1.97	85,772	0.19	2
Right-wing socialist blocs (Note: Various local alliances of Popular Socialists, cooperatives, right-wing Mensheviks, right-wing SRs, Plekhanov's Unity group, etc.): Constituency / List / Votes / %; Don Cossack Region / List 1 - Bloc of Socialists (right-wing socialists, incl. Unity) / 5,718 / 0.41; Kazan / List 3 - Cooperatives and Independent Socialists / 2,993 / 0.35; Kharkov / List 19 - Cooperators and Unity / 590 / 0.05; Moscow Metropolis / List 8 - Democratic Socialist Bloc (incl. Cooperative, Unity) / 35,305 / 4.62; Oryol / List 7 - Unity, Cooperators and Popular Socialists / 1,384 / 0.17; Perm / List 11 - Bloc of Rightist SRs and Unity / 29,112 / 2.28; Steppes / List 10 - United Socialists (Mensheviks-Rightwing Socialist Bloc) / 4,731 / 4.77; Western Front / List 10 - Bloc of Popular Socialists, Unity and right-wing SRs (based around the Volya Naroda newspaper) / 2,840 / 0.29	82,673	0.18	8
Muinil Islam Society (Fergana)	76,849	0.17	1
Estonian Democratic Bloc (Estonia)	68,085	0.15	1
Ittehad (Transcaucasus)	66,504	0.14	1
Estonian Labour Party (Estonia)	64,704	0.14	1
Buryat National Committee: Constituency / List / Votes / %; Irkutsk / List 5 - Buryat National Committee, SRs / 39,248 / 18.85; Transbaikal / List 2 - Buryat National Committee / 17,083 / 17.39	56,331	0.12	2
Union of Ukrainian Peasants, Ukrainian Refugees and the Organization of Tatar Socialist Revolutionaries (Saratov)	53,445	0.12	1
Union of Socialists of the Volga German Region (Samara)	42,148	0.09	1
Lettish Peasant Union: Constituency / List / Votes / %; Livonia / List 1- Lettish Peasants Union / 31,253 / 22.97; Pskov / List 8 - Lettish Peasant Union and Lettish Radical Democratic Party / 3,859 / 0.75	35,112	0.08	2
United Jewish Socialist Labour Party (S.S. and E.S.): Constituency / List / Votes / %; Ekaterinoslav / List 2 - United Jewish Socialist Labour Party (S.S. and E.S.) / 5,831 / 0.49; Kharkov / List 13 - Serp / 917 / 0.08; Kiev / List 3 - Jewish Socialists / 14,115 / 0.94; Minsk / List 1 - United Socialist Jewish Labour Party (S.S. and E.S.) / 4,880 / 0.53; Mogilev / List 3 - United Jewish Socialist Labour Party (S.S. and E.S.) / 4,004 / 0.55; Podolia / List 3 - United Jewish Socialist Labour Party (S.S. and E.S.) / 3,415 / 0.41; Poltava / List 7 - United Jewish Socialist Labour Party (S.S. and E.S.) / 1,482 / 0.13	34,644	0.08	7
Bund (Note: In most constituencies where the Bund was active, it contested on joint lists with the Mensheviks. This line only counts the 3 constituencies were the Bund ran its own lists.): Constituency / List / Votes / %; Ekaterinoslav / List 11 - Bund / 4,883 / 0.41; Kiev / List 9 - Bund / 20,144 / 1.34; Podolia / List 5 - Bund / 7,959 / 0.96	32,986	0.07	3
National Bloc (Ukrainians, Muslims, Poles and Lithuanians) (Penza)	29,821	0.06	1
Uighur-Dungan alliance (Semirechie)	28,386	0.06	1
Commercial-Industrial lists: Constituency / List / Votes / %; Chernigov / List 12 - Commercial-Industrial / 525 / 0.05; Kharkov / List 12 - Commercial-Industrial / 6,543 / 0.6; Kiev / List 16 - Commercial-Industrial / 2,508 / 0.17; Moscow Metropolis / List 12 - Commercial-Industrial Group / 2,300 / 0.3; Oryol / List 4 - Commercial-Industrial Union / 4,462 / 0.55; Tula / List 7 - Commercial-Industrial / 6,624 / 1.39; Tver / List 8 - Commercial-Industrial Union / 812 / 0.13; Vyatka / List 2 - Vyatka Governorate Commercial and Industrial Union / 3,424 / 0.53	27,198	0.06	8
Socialist-Federalists and Peasants of Latgale (Vitebsk)	26,990	0.06	1
Jewish Social Democratic Labour Party (Poalei Zion): Constituency / List / Votes / %; Chernigov / List 11 - Poalei Zion / 2,808 / 0.29; Ekaterinoslav / List 8 - Poalei Zion / 3,307 / 0.28; Kharkov / List 8 - Poalei Zion / 875 / 0.08; Kherson / List 6 - Poalei Zion / 1,687 / 0.27; Kiev / List 4 - Poalei Zion / 4,086 / 0.27; Minsk / List 10 - Jewish Soc.-Dem. Labour Party (Poalei Zion) / 6,184 / 0.67; Mogilev / List 4 - Jewish Soc.-Dem. Labour Party (Poalei Zion) / 2,596 / 0.36; Podolia / List 7 - Poalei Zion / 2,164 / 0.26; Poltava / List 4 - Poalei Zion / 879 / 0.08; Taurida / List 8 - Poalei Zion / 1,745 / 0.3	26,331	0.06	10
Unity: Constituency / List / Votes / %; Ekaterinoslav / List 15 - Unity / 7,363 / 0.62; Kharkov / List 14 - Unity / 2,293 / 0.21; Kiev / List 17 - Unity / 928 / 0.06; Novgorod / List 5 - Unity / 860 / 0.18; Petrograd Metropolis / List 18 - All-Russian Soc.-Dem. Organization "Unity" / 1,823 / 0.19; Samara / List 11 - Unity / 937 / 0.08; Taurida / List 7 - Unity / 2,273 / 0.4; Tver / List 4 - Unity and Union of Credit and Savings Associations / 975 / 0.16; Ufa / List 7 - Unity / 3,078 / 0.32; Vologda / List 5 - Unity / 3,742 / 0.88	24,272	0.05	10
Menshevik Defencists: Constituency / List / Votes / %; Kharkov / List 9 - Menshevik Defencists / 6,024 / 0.55; Petrograd Metropolis / List 17 - Menshevik Defencists (Potresovites) / 17,427 / 1.85	23,451	0.05	2
Georgian National Democrats (Transcaucasus)	22,499	0.05	1
Menshevik-Internationalists (Note: Does not include any results for joint lists with the Bolsheviks): Constituency / List / Votes / %; Kharkov / List 4 - Menshevik-Internationalists / 12,192 / 1.12; Moscow Metropolis / List 10 - United Internationalists / 1,907 / 0.25; Northern Front / List 6 - Menshevik-Internationalists (Novayazhiznists) / 4,454 / 0.53; Samara / List 14 - Menshevik-Internationalists / 936 / 0.08; Steppes / List 4 - Menshevik-Internationalists / 1,775 / 1.79; Tula / List 8 - Menshevik-Internationalists / 550 / 0.12	21,814	0.05	6
Cooperative movement: Constituency / List / Votes / %; Novgorod / List 8 - Union of Cooperativists / 1,123 / 0.23; Orenburg / List 6 - Cooperative / 7,296 / 1.08; Petrograd / List 6 - Cooperative Group / 841 / 0.18; Tomsk / List 6 - Cooperative Organizations of Tomsk Governorate / 2,686 / 0.42; Tula / List 9 - Cooperative / 1,294 / 0.27; Ufa / List 4 - Cooperative / 4,941 / 0.52; Vladimir / List 7 - Cooperative / 1,482 / 0.25	19,663	0.04	7
Georgian Socialist-Federalists (Transcaucasus)	19,042	0.04	1
Estonian Socialist Revolutionary Party (Estonia)	17,726	0.04	1
Ukrainian non-socialists: Constituency / List / Votes / %; Chernigov / List 15 - Non-Partisan Public Figures / 12,050 / 1.24; Poltava / List 11 - Ukrainian National Republican Group / 1,070 / 0.09; Kharkov / List 7 - E. Abramov / 3,776 / 0.35	16,896	0.04	3
Estonian Radical Democratic Party (Estonia)	17,022	0.04	1
Estonian List (Petrograd)	15,963	0.03	1
All-Russian Peasants Union: Constituency / List / Votes / %; Moscow / List 6 - All-Russian Peasants Union / 12,967 / 2.08; Moscow Metropolis / List 11 - All-Russian Peasants Union / 2,279 / 0.3	15,246	0.03	2
Finnish Socialists (Petrograd)	14,807	0.03	1
International Unity of Christian Democrats (Roman Catholics) (Petrograd Metro)	14,382	0.03	1
Dissident leftist SR lists (Note: Includes the leftist dissident lists, that contested against the official SR party lists. In locations where the left faction of the SRs dominated the official party list, the result is included in the main SR count.): Constituency / List / Votes / %; Kuban-Black Sea / List 1 - Leftist SRs / 357 / 1.9; Priamur / List 8 - SRs of Vladivostok, Nikolayevsk-on-Amur and Spassk (leftist Socialist-Revolutionaries) / 5,805 / 2.77; Tobolsk / List 6 - Socialist-Revolutionaries (Northern Group), leftists / 3,733 / 0.75; Vyatka / List 12 - Glazovski Uezd Congress of Workers, Soldiers and Peasants Soviets (Left Socialist-Revolutionaries) / 942 / 0.15; Yenisei / List 5 - Internationalists (leftist SRs) / 3,668 / 1.03	14,505	0.03	5
Armenian Populist Party (Transcaucasus)	13,099	0.03	1
Leftist SRs-Ukrainian SRs-Polish Socialist Party alliance (Voronezh)	11,871	0.03	1
Estonian Social Democratic Association (Estonia)	9,244	0.02	1
Greek Settlement of Mariupol uezd (Yekaterinoslav)	9,143	0.02	1
Belarusian Socialist Assembly: Constituency / List / Votes / %; Kaluga / List 6 - Belarusian Socialist Assembly / 1,067 / 0.27; Minsk / List 13 - Belarusian Socialist Assembly / 2,998 / 0.33; Western Front / List 4 - Belarusian Socialist Assembly and the Congress of Belarusian Soldiers of the Western Front / 4,380 / 0.45	8,445	0.02	3
Folkspartei (Note: In many locations the Folkspartei joined Jewish national lists.): Constituency / List / Votes / %; Mogilev / List 7 - Yidishe Folkspartei and Non-Party Democratic Committee / 1,737 / 0.24; Poltava / List 1 - Folkspartei / 6,448 / 0.56	8,185	0.02	2
Other Ukrainians (Note: Includes 6 Ukrainian lists, outside of Ukraine, with unclear party identity.): Constituency / List / Votes / %; Kuban-Black Sea / Ukrainians (Lists 5 and 9) / 98 / 0.6; Nizhny Novgorod / List 6 - Ukrainian Group / 126 / 0.02; Priamur / List 6 - Amur Oblast Ukrainian Council / 3,125 / 1.49; Samara / List 10 - Ukrainians / 4,378 / 0.36; Ter-Dagestan / List 10 - Ukrainians / 209 / 0.54	7,936	0.02	6
All Russian League for Women's Equality: Constituency / List / Votes / %; Petrograd Metropolis / List 7 - All-Russian League for Women's Equality / 5,310 / 0.56; Pskov / List 9 - All-Russian League for Women's Equality / 2,366 / 0.46	7,676	0.02	2
Moldovan National Party (Bessarabia)	6,643	0.01	1
Lettish Democrats-Nationalists (Vitebsk)	5,881	0.01	1
Latgallian Popular Committee and Latgallian; Socialist Party of Working People (Vitebsk)	5,118	0.01	1
Other lists with less than 5,000 votes: Constituency / List / Votes / %; Petrograd Metropolis / List 14 - Independent Union of Workers, Soldiers and Peasants / 4,942 / 0.52; Black Sea Fleet / List 2 - Baltic Sea Tsentroflot and the Sevastopol Branch of the Union of Sailors / 4,769 / 9.06; Moscow / List 7 - Democratic Non-partisan Group of Members of District Committees of Sergiev Posad / 4,497 / 0.72; Yaroslavl / List 6 - Bloc of Traders, Industrialists, Artisans and Homeowners / 4,421 / 0.96; Podolia / List 12 - Ukrainian Toilers List / 3,810 / 0.46; Petrograd Metropolis / List 3 - Christian Democratic Party / 3,797 / 0.40; Romanian Front / List 9 -Lettish Soldiers / 3,386 / 0.30; Mogilev / List 8 - White Russian Organizations / 2,523 / 0.35; Moscow Metropolis / List 2 - National-Socialist Bloc (Ukrainian Socialist Bloc and Nationalist Bloc) / 2,346 / 0.31; Pskov / List 7 - Pskov United Democratic Groups of Townspeople, Peasants and Workers / 2,337 / 0.45; Yenisei / List 7 - Siberian Autonomist / 2,299 / 0.65; Baltic Fleet / List 3 - List without title (Officers' Union) / 2,018 / 1.79; Kazan / List 8 - Agricultural-Artisan-Commercial-Industrial group / 2,001 / 0.23; Baltic Fleet / List 5 - Non-Partisan Group / 1,948 / 1.73; Smolensk / List 5 - Nationalist Bloc / 1,708 / 0.26; Poltava / List 5 - List without title / 1,657 / 0.14; Chernigov / List 8 - Toiling Peasants / 1,020 / 0.10; Chernigov / List 13 - Employees of Government Agencies / 1,005 / 0.10; Kiev / List 10 - Villagers' Group / 655 / 0.04; Kiev / List 7 - Military Revolutionary Union / 258 / 0.02; Kiev / List 15 - Zaustsinsky / 203 / 0.01; Oryol / List 1 - Union of Homeowners / 438 / 0.05; Petrograd Metropolis / List 10 - People's Development League / 386 / 0.04; Petrograd Metropolis / List 13 - Women's Union for Motherland / 318 / 0.03; Petrograd Metropolis / List 5 - Universal League of National Associations of Socialist-Universalists / 158 / 0.02; Podolia / List 13 - Ushitsky Uezd List / 284 / 0.03; Smolensk / List 2 - Group Allied with Socialist Parties / 645 / 0.1; Steppes / List 9 - Cossack-Socialists / 475 / 0.48; Taurida / Molokan / 885 / 0.15; Ter-Dagestan / List 9 - Chechen-Ingush Peoples / 332 / 0.86; Voronezh / List 7 - Mazury Society of Novokhopersky Uezd / 796 / 0.07; Arkhangelsk / List 3 - Citizens Group of Kurlev volost / 1,160 / 0.91; Olonets / List 3 - Citizens of Vazhinskaya Volost, Olonets Uezd / 2,813 / 1.87; Vitebsk / List 14 - Citizens of Boletskii Volost of Gorodsky Uezd / 752 / 0.13	61,042	0.13	34
Unaccounted	294,530	0.64	
Total	45,904,897	100.00	640
Sources: Radkey (1989), Spirin (1987), Hovannisian (1967), Vestnik Evrazii (2004)

== Studies on the Constituent Assembly election outcome ==
=== Svyatitsky and Lenin ===
There are various different accounts of the election result, with varying numbers. Many accounts on the election result originate from N. V. Svyatitsky's account, who was himself elected as an SR deputy to the Constituent Assembly. His article was included in the one-year anniversary symposium of the Russian Revolution organized by the SR party (Moscow, Zemlya i Volya Publishers, 1918). Lenin (1919) describes Svyatitsky's account as extremely interesting. It presented results from 54 electoral districts, covering most of European Russia and Siberia. Notably is lacked details from the Olonets, Estonian, Kaluga, Bessarabian, Podolsk, Orenburg, Yakutsk, Don governorates, as well as Transcaucasus. All in all, Svyatitsky's account includes 36,257,960 votes. According to Lenin, the actual number from said 54 electoral districts was 36,262,560 votes. But Lenin reaffirms that between Svyatitisky's article and his account, the number of votes cast by party is largely identical.

Lenin's account of the 1917 Russian Constituent Assembly result (54 districts)
Bloc	Votes	%	Party	Votes	%
Party of the Proletariat	9,023,963	25	Bolsheviks	9,023,963	25
Petty-bourgeoisie democratic parties	22,616,064	62	Socialist-Revolutionaries	20,900,000	58
Petty-bourgeoisie democratic parties	22,616,064	62	Mensheviks	668,064	2
Petty-bourgeoisie democratic parties	22,616,064	62	Popular Socialists	312,000	1
Petty-bourgeoisie democratic parties	22,616,064	62	Unity	25,000	
Petty-bourgeoisie democratic parties	22,616,064	62	Cooperative	51,000	
Petty-bourgeoisie democratic parties	22,616,064	62	Ukrainian Soc.-Dem.	95,000	
Petty-bourgeoisie democratic parties	22,616,064	62	Ukrainian Socialists	507,000	1
Petty-bourgeoisie democratic parties	22,616,064	62	German socialists	44,000	
Petty-bourgeoisie democratic parties	22,616,064	62	Finnish Socialists	14,000	
Parties of landowners and bourgeoisie	4,539,639	13	Kadets	1,856,639	5
Parties of landowners and bourgeoisie	4,539,639	13	Association of Rural Proprietors and Landowners	215,000	1
Parties of landowners and bourgeoisie	4,539,639	13	Right groups	292,000	1
Parties of landowners and bourgeoisie	4,539,639	13	Old Believers	73,000	
Parties of landowners and bourgeoisie	4,539,639	13	Jews	550,000	2
Parties of landowners and bourgeoisie	4,539,639	13	Muslims	576,000	2
Parties of landowners and bourgeoisie	4,539,639	13	Bashkirs	195,000	
Parties of landowners and bourgeoisie	4,539,639	13	Letts	67,000	
Parties of landowners and bourgeoisie	4,539,639	13	Polish	155,000	
Parties of landowners and bourgeoisie	4,539,639	13	German	130,000	
Parties of landowners and bourgeoisie	4,539,639	13	White Russians	12,000	
Parties of landowners and bourgeoisie	4,539,639	13	Lists of various groups and organizations	418,000	1

=== Radkey and Spirin ===
Later studies often use Svyatitsky's 1918 account as their starting point for further elaboration. L. M. Spirin (1987) uses local newspapers and Russian, Belarusian and Ukrainian archival holdings to supplement Svyatitsky, whereas U.S. historian Oliver Henry Radkey predominately uses local newspapers as sources. According to Rabinovitch (2016), Spirin's account is the most complete. According to Arato (2017), Radkey is the most serious historian on the 1917 election.

Radkey uses a number of uses broad categories in presenting the result party-wise: SRs (sometimes distinguished between left/right), Bolsheviks, Mensheviks (sometimes divided between Menshevik-Internationalists and Right-wing pro-war Mensheviks), Other Socialists (with subcategories) Kadets, Special interests (including subcategories peasants, landowners, Cossacks, middle-class, others), Religious (Orthodox, Old Believers, others), Ukrainian (with subcategories), Turkic-Tatar (with subcategories), Other Nationalities (with subcategories).

The main source for the results table is Radkey (1989), who is used as reference for district-wise results unless specified otherwise. List numbers and names are largely taken from the Soviet historian L. M. Spirin's work. Notably, one list has been included that appears in Radkey but not in Spirin (the Molokan list in Taurida, with 885 votes).

Essentially, Radkey uses 5 classifications on the completeness of the district-level electoral result in his study:

Complete or presumably complete:	Olonets • Petrograd Metropolis • Pskov • Novgorod • Estonia • Vitebsk • Minsk • Smolensk • Moscow Metropolis • Tver • Yaroslavl • Kostroma • Vladimir • Kaluga • Oryol • Kursk • Voronezh • Tambov • Penza • Nizhni Novgorod • Simbirsk • Kazan • Samara • Saratov • Perm • Ufa • Orenburg • Kiev • Chernigov • Poltava • Kharkov • Yekaterinoslav • Don Cossack Region • Stavropol • Uralsk • Semirechie • Tobolsk • Tomsk • Altai • Chinese Eastern Railroad • Baltic Fleet • Black Sea Fleet • Northern Front
Somewhat incomplete (missing up to 1 uezd):	Moscow • Petrograd • Livonia • Ryazan • Astrakhan • Volynia • Taurida • Yenisei • Irkutsk • Priamur • Western Front • South-Western Front • Romanian Front
Substantially incomplete (missing results from more than 1 uezd):	Arkhangelsk • Vologda • Tula • Vyatka • Podolia • Kherson • Transbaikal • Transcaucasus
Fragmentary (missing more than half of the results from the district), but still used in the results table:	Mogilev • Ter-Dagestan (no deputies elected) • Bessarabia • Steppes (no deputies elected) • Kamchatka • Caucasian Front
No election or no result	Fergana • Kuban-Black Sea • Turgai • Amu Darya • Syr Darya • Transcaspian • Samarkand • Pricaspian • Horde • Yakutsk • Russian forces in France and the Balkans

From Radkey's account, there are 294,530 "unaccounted" votes, i.e. votes that were registered in totals but without their list identity clarified.

=== Protasov ===
A more recent research effort is represented by Russian historian L. G. Protasov, whose 1997 account includes 48,401,962 votes from 75 electoral districts. His estimate is that electoral participation was around 63-64%. In comparison with other historians, Protasov uses the category "Other socialists" to include many of the national minority parties. However, a 2004 account by Protasov puts the total number of accounted votes at 47,167,621.

Protasov records 765 deputies elected from 73 electoral districts; out of them 345 SRs, 47 Ukrainian SRs, 175 Bolsheviks, 17 Mensheviks, 7 Ukrainian Social Democrats, 14 Kadets, 2 Popular Socialists, another 32 Ukrainian socialists (possibly SRs or social democrats), 13 Muslim socialists, 10 Dashnaks, 68 from other national parties, 16 Cossacks, 10 Christians and one clergyman.

Electoral district	SRs		Popular Socialists		Mensheviks		Bolsheviks		Others socialists		Kadets		National lists		Rightists		Others		Total
	#	%	#	%	#	%	#	%	#	%	#	%	#	%	#	%	#	%	#
Altai	621,377	87.03%	6,068	0.85%	3,785	0.53%	45,268	6.34%		0.00%	12,108	1.70%	8,048	1.13%	17,292	2.42%		0.00%	713,946
Arkhangelsk	106,570	65.11%		0.00%	7,335	4.48%	36,522	22.31%		0.00%	12,086	7.38%		0.00%		0.00%	1,160	0.71%	163,673
Astrakhan	100,482	51.77%	942	0.49%	2,220	1.14%	36,023	18.56%		0.00%	13,017	6.71%	25,023	12.89%		0.00%	16,400	8.45%	194,107
Bessarabia	112,886	32.37%	1,367	0.39%	4,179	1.20%	28,614	8.21%	10,797	3.10%	19,050	5.46%	49,018	14.06%	6,317	1.81%	116,467	33.40%	348,695
Vitebsk	150,279	26.81%	3,599	0.64%	12,471	2.22%	287,101	51.22%	32,108	5.73%	8,132	1.45%	41,227	7.35%	15,117	2.70%	10,504	1.87%	560,538
Vladimir	196,886	32.22%	6,917	1.13%	13,139	2.15%	345,306	56.50%		0.00%	38,058	6.23%		0.00%	9,193	1.50%	1,659	0.27%	611,158
Vologda	348,239	74.11%	8,340	1.77%	3,606	0.77%		0.00%	84,358	17.95%	25,357	5.40%		0.00%		0.00%		0.00%	469,900
Volynia	27,575	3.43%		0.00%	16,947	2.11%	35,612	4.43%	570,073	70.89%	22,397	2.78%	113,992	14.17%	1,746	0.22%	15,866	1.97%	804,208
Voronezh	875,300	79.72%	6,116	0.56%	8,658	0.79%	151,517	13.80%	11,871	1.08%	36,488	3.32%		0.00%	7,281	0.66%	769	0.07%	1,098,000
Vyatka	612,525	56.99%	37,621	3.50%	19,167	1.78%	236,952	22.05%		0.00%	48,106	4.48%	55,585	5.17%	9,396	0.87%	55,476	5.16%	1,074,828
Don Cossack Region	478,901	34.05%	5,049	0.36%	17,504	1.24%	205,497	14.61%	5,718	0.41%	43,345	3.08%		0.00%	13,640	0.97%	636,966	45.28%	1,406,620
Yekaterinoslav	231,717	19.42%	9,496	0.80%	39,155	3.28%	213,163	17.87%	565,150	47.37%	27,551	2.31%	72,152	6.05%	34,665	2.91%		0.00%	1,193,049
Yenisei	233,345	65.40%	8,000	2.24%	4,581	1.28%	96,138	26.95%		0.00%	12,263	3.44%		0.00%		0.00%	2,452	0.69%	356,779
Transbaikal	104,220	58.67%	4,260	2.40%	3,245	1.83%	17,260	9.72%		0.00%	7,200	4.05%	26,155	14.72%	218	0.12%	15,078	8.49%	177,636
Transcaucasus	117,522	4.79%	514	0.02%	661,934	26.98%	93,581	3.81%	825,672	33.66%	25,673	1.05%	728,206	29.69%		0.00%		0.00%	2,453,102
Irkutsk	127,834	54.36%	14,935	6.35%	6,899	2.93%	33,576	14.28%		0.00%	9,393	3.99%	39,248	16.69%	3,267	1.39%		0.00%	235,152
Kazan	273,978	31.91%		0.00%	4,906	0.57%	51,936	6.05%	382,640	44.57%	31,728	3.70%	99,080	11.54%	12,322	1.44%	2,001	0.23%	858,591
Kaluga	127,313	32.65%	601	0.15%	6,996	1.79%	225,378	57.81%	1,067	0.27%	24,125	6.19%		0.00%	4,409	1.13%		0.00%	389,889
Kamchatka (Note: Incomplete result)	226	67.06%		0.00%	95	28.19%		0.00%		0.00%		0.00%		0.00%		0.00%	16	4.75%	337
Kiev	19,220	1.27%	3,072	0.20%	32,685	2.16%	60,693	4.02%	1,179,234	78.11%	28,667	1.90%	133,766	8.86%	48,758	3.23%	3,624	0.24%	1,509,719
Chinese Eastern Railway	5,079	14.45%		0.00%	13,138	37.37%	10,613	30.19%		0.00%	6,322	17.98%		0.00%		0.00%		0.00%	35,152
Kostroma	249,838	44.97%		0.00%	19,488	3.51%	226,905	40.84%		0.00%	41,448	7.46%		0.00%	17,901	3.22%		0.00%	555,580
Kursk	869,497	82.02%	8,591	0.81%	6,043	0.57%	120,094	11.33%		0.00%	47,221	4.45%		0.00%	8,715	0.82%		0.00%	1,060,161
Kuban-Black Sea	2,828	12.95%		0.00%	794	3.63%	9,167	41.96%		0.00%	3,226	14.77%	98	0.45%		0.00%	5,733	26.24%	21,846
Livonia		0.00%		0.00%	7,046	5.18%	97,781	71.86%		0.00%		0.00%		0.00%		0.00%	31,253	22.97%	136,080
Minsk	181,673	19.81%		0.00%	16,277	1.77%	579,087	63.13%	14,054	1.53%	10,724	1.17%	101,928	11.11%	13,505	1.47%		0.00%	917,248
Mogilev	511,998	70.62%		0.00%	21,664	2.99%	93,060	12.83%	6,600	0.91%	19,316	2.66%	62,278	8.59%	10,136	1.40%		0.00%	725,052
Moscow Metropolis	62,260	8.14%	2,508	0.33%	21,597	2.82%	366,148	47.88%	37,651	4.92%	263,859	34.50%		0.00%		0.00%	10,740	1.40%	764,763
Moscow	172,229	26.10%	6,978	1.06%	27,928	4.23%	368,264	55.81%		0.00%	44,478	6.74%		0.00%	8,458	1.28%	31,536	4.78%	659,871
Nizhni Novgorod	314,472	53.67%	5,186	0.89%	7,660	1.31%	133,970	22.87%	19,959	3.41%	34,724	5.93%	402	0.07%	67,305	11.49%	2,216	0.38%	585,894
Novgorod	220,665	45.36%	10,314	2.12%	10,196	2.10%	203,658	41.87%		0.00%	31,484	6.47%		0.00%	7,804	1.60%	2,301	0.47%	486,422
Olonets		0.00%		0.00%		0.00%		0.00%	127,120	84.63%	20,278	13.50%		0.00%		0.00%	2,813	1.87%	150,211
Oryol	510,628	62.78%		0.00%	16,301	2.00%	241,785	29.73%	3,338	0.41%	18,345	2.26%		0.00%	12,911	1.59%	10,096	1.24%	813,404
Orenburg	112,209	15.93%	6,550	0.93%	9,575	1.36%	166,121	23.58%		0.00%	24,847	3.53%	158,663	22.52%		0.00%	226,604	32.16%	704,569
Penza	517,226	81.29%	4,336	0.68%	4,726	0.74%	54,731	8.60%		0.00%	25,407	3.99%	29,821	4.69%		0.00%		0.00%	636,247
Perm	665,118	52.05%		0.00%	27,502	2.15%	268,292	20.99%	29,012	2.27%	111,241	8.71%	77,861	6.09%	83,734	6.55%	15,129	1.18%	1,277,889
Petrograd Metropolis	156,936	16.68%	19,109	2.03%	29,820	3.17%	424,024	45.06%	4,377	0.47%	246,506	26.19%		0.00%	42,308	4.50%	18,001	1.91%	941,081
Petrograd	119,761	25.38%	12,048	2.55%	6,100	1.29%	229,698	48.68%	16,904	3.58%	64,859	13.75%	15,963	3.38%	5,661	1.20%	841	0.18%	471,835
Podolia	11,052	1.30%	852	0.10%	12,487	1.47%	32,942	3.88%	660,432	77.86%	9,371	1.10%	113,588	13.39%		0.00%	7,530	0.89%	848,254
Poltava	198,437	17.27%	4,391	0.38%	5,993	0.52%	64,460	5.61%	761,313	66.24%	18,105	1.58%	33,340	2.90%		0.00%	63,217	5.50%	1,149,256
Priamur	61,967	25.72%		0.00%	16,772	6.96%	43,534	18.07%		0.00%	17,799	7.39%	3,275	1.36%		0.00%	97,556	40.50%	240,903
Pskov	295,012	57.25%	4,059	0.79%	4,870	0.95%	173,631	33.69%		0.00%	25,961	5.04%	3,859	0.75%	3,209	0.62%	4,703	0.91%	515,304
Ryazan	427,364	56.64%	5,695	0.75%	5,039	0.67%	272,153	36.07%		0.00%	30,734	4.07%		0.00%	9,368	1.24%	4,216	0.56%	754,569
Samarkand	4,238	4.47%		0.00%	1,586	1.67%		0.00%		0.00%		0.00%	87,059	91.84%		0.00%	1,913	2.02%	94,796
Samara	690,341	57.16%	4,369	0.36%	6,125	0.51%	195,132	16.16%	51,212	4.24%	44,507	3.68%	192,861	15.97%	20,180	1.67%	3,083	0.26%	1,207,810
Saratov	612,094	56.28%	10,243	0.94%	15,152	1.39%	261,308	24.03%		0.00%	27,226	2.50%	103,470	9.51%	51,774	4.76%	6,379	0.59%	1,087,646
Semirechie		0.00%		0.00%		0.00%		0.00%	120,150	34.42%		0.00%	200,639	57.48%		0.00%	28,272	8.10%	349,061
Simbirsk	424,185	67.25%	7,953	1.26%	4,785	0.76%	90,388	14.33%		0.00%	18,303	2.90%	71,931	11.40%	11,130	1.76%	2,116	0.34%	630,791
Smolensk	250,134	38.00%	2,855	0.43%	7,901	1.20%	361,062	54.85%		0.00%	29,274	4.45%	1,708	0.26%	5,300	0.81%		0.00%	658,234
Stavropol	291,395	88.86%	670	0.20%	1,836	0.56%	17,430	5.32%		0.00%	10,898	3.32%		0.00%	3,078	0.94%	2,609	0.80%	327,916
Steppes	14,930	7.67%		0.00%	2,500	1.28%	18,901	9.71%	7,713	3.96%	7,886	4.05%	135,386	69.55%	1,469	0.75%	5,869	3.02%	194,654
Taurida	300,150	52.79%	4,544	0.80%	16,875	2.97%	31,154	5.48%	63,271	11.13%	38,108	6.70%	105,586	18.57%	8,022	1.41%	825	0.15%	568,535
Tambov	837,497	71.27%	7,412	0.63%	22,424	1.91%	240,652	20.48%	6,222	0.53%	47,548	4.05%		0.00%	12,494	1.06%	889	0.08%	1,175,138
Tver	245,997	34.40%	3,739	0.52%	18,752	2.62%	398,479	55.72%		0.00%	37,453	5.24%		0.00%	7,723	1.08%	2,974	0.42%	715,117
Ter-Dagestan	11,542	13.29%	443	0.51%	1,461	1.68%	29,889	34.41%	386	0.44%	11,330	13.04%	1,881	2.17%		0.00%	29,924	34.45%	86,856
Tobolsk	392,061	79.28%	50,780	10.27%	12,061	2.44%		0.00%		0.00%	13,793	2.79%	25,830	5.22%		0.00%		0.00%	494,525
Tomsk	541,153	85.16%	15,802	2.49%	5,769	0.91%	51,456	8.10%		0.00%	18,618	2.93%		0.00%		0.00%	2,686	0.42%	635,484
Tula	256,069	47.52%	1,991	0.37%	10,940	2.03%	237,558	44.09%		0.00%	22,782	4.23%		0.00%		0.00%	9,516	1.77%	538,856
Turgai	63,650	22.60%		0.00%	6,758	2.40%		0.00%		0.00%		0.00%	211,274	75.00%		0.00%		0.00%	281,682
Uralsk	5,076	1.37%		0.00%		0.00%		0.00%		0.00%		0.00%	278,014	75.01%		0.00%	87,535	23.62%	370,625
Ufa	322,166	33.69%	11,429	1.20%	2,614	0.27%	48,151	5.03%	304,844	31.87%	15,825	1.65%	224,817	23.51%	11,178	1.17%	15,372	1.61%	956,396
Fergana		0.00%		0.00%		0.00%		0.00%		0.00%		0.00%	770,284	100.00%		0.00%		0.00%	770,284
Kharkov	838,873	76.51%	11,852	1.08%	20,529	1.87%	114,743	10.46%	1,802	0.16%	61,302	5.59%	11,587	1.06%	24,335	2.22%	11,448	1.04%	1,096,451
Kherson	368,078	40.65%	6,177	0.68%	17,371	1.92%	107,975	11.92%	65,210	7.20%	57,699	6.37%	117,805	13.01%	21,609	2.39%	143,647	15.86%	905,571
Chernigov	105,565	10.84%	10,089	1.04%	10,813	1.11%	271,174	27.85%	486,964	50.01%	28,864	2.96%	28,308	2.91%	16,715	1.72%	15,154	1.56%	973,646
Estonia	3,200	1.07%	64,704	21.58%		0.00%	119,863	39.98%		0.00%		0.00%	68,085	22.71%		0.00%	17,022	5.68%	299,844
Yakutsk	1,208	33.72%		0.00%	247	6.90%		0.00%		0.00%	586	16.36%		0.00%		0.00%	1,541	43.02%	3,582
Yaroslavl	197,465	43.07%	5,637	1.23%	16,803	3.66%	176,035	38.39%		0.00%	53,730	11.72%		0.00%	4,427	0.97%	4,421	0.96%	458,518
Baltic Fleet	45,016	39.08%		0.00%		0.00%	66,810	58.00%		0.00%		0.00%		0.00%		0.00%	3,997	3.47%	115,193
Black Sea Fleet	22,251	42.28%		0.00%	1,943	3.69%	10,771	20.47%	12,895	24.50%		0.00%		0.00%		0.00%	4,769	9.06%	52,629
Northern Front	249,832	29.72%	5,868	0.70%	10,420	1.24%	471,828	56.13%	88,956	10.58%	13,687	1.63%		0.00%		0.00%		0.00%	840,591
Western Front	180,582	18.50%		0.00%	9,700	0.99%	653,430	66.95%	68,455	7.01%	16,750	1.72%		0.00%		0.00%	47,083	4.82%	976,000
South-Western Front	402,930	40.00%	1,125	0.11%	79,630	7.90%	300,112	29.79%	177,354	17.60%	13,724	1.36%	9,465	0.94%		0.00%	23,083	2.29%	1,007,423
Romanian Front	670,047	59.53%	4,004	0.36%	36,485	3.24%	173,728	15.43%	188,760	16.77%	20,956	1.86%	31,623	2.81%		0.00%		0.00%	1,125,603
Caucasian Front	229,705	69.40%		0.00%	20,574	6.22%	61,783	18.67%	10,285	3.11%	8,640	2.61%		0.00%		0.00%		0.00%	330,987
Total	19,110,074	39.48%	439,200	0.91%	1,522,577	3.15%	10,890,067	22.50%	7,030,897	14.53%	2,180,488	4.50%	4,670,189	9.65%	674,160	1.39%	1,885,050	3.89%	48,401,962

== District-wise results ==
The voting figures presented in the tables below are from Radkey (1989), unless stated otherwise. In various districts, Radkey was not able to present a full account of the vote. In many cases the sources available to Radkey did not include all the lists in a specific district, meaning that in the account as a whole smaller parties tend to get underrepresented in many of the district-wise accounts. In some districts Radkey uses different sources for different lists, creating partially incomplete listings.

The names of elected deputies originate from Protasov (2008). Party identity has been simplified. SR lists often included labels such as 'Socialist-Revolutionaries and Congress of Peasants Deputies' or 'Earth and Will', for example, but are here just presented as SR.

=== Metropolitan cities ===
==== Petrograd City ====
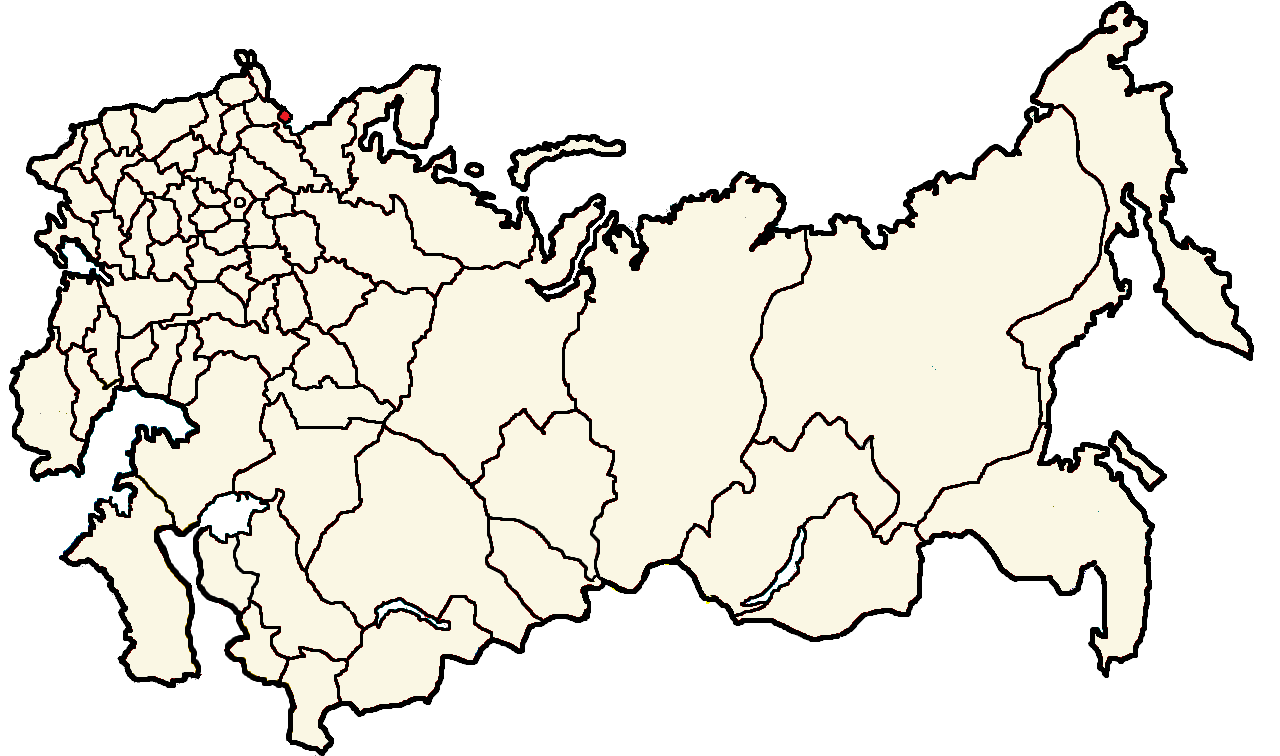
Petrograd Metropolis electoral district

Petrograd city constituted an electoral district of its own, separate from the rest of the Petrograd Governorate. Voter turnout in the capital was estimated at between 69.7% and 72%.

For the Petrograd Metropolitan district, Radkey assigns 861 votes as "unaccounted" for minor lists. Spirin presents lists 5, 10 and 13 with a total vote of 862. In the results tally below, Spirin's data is used for these 3 lists.

Petrograd City
Party	Vote	%	Seats	%
List 4 - Bolsheviks	424,027	45.00	6	50.00
List 2 - Kadets	246,506	26.16	4	33.33
List 9 - Socialist-Revolutionaries	152,230	16.15	2	16.67
List 12 - United Orthodox Parishes	24,139	2.56	0	0.00
List 1 - Popular Socialists	19,109	2.03	0	0.00
List 17 - Menshevik Defencists (Potresovites)	17,427	1.85	0	0.00
List 15 - International Unity of Christian Democrats (Roman Catholics)	14,382	1.53	0	0.00
List 16 - Mensheviks	11,740	1.25	0	0.00
List 19 - Council of the Union of Cossack Host	6,712	0.71	0	0.00
List 7 - All-Russian League for Women's Equality	5,310	0.56	0	0.00
List 14 - Independent Union of Workers, Soldiers and Peasants	4,942	0.52	0	0.00
List 8 - Petrograd Group of SR Defencists (Volya Naroda group)	4,696	0.50	0	0.00
List 6 - Petrograd organizations of the Ukrainian Soc.-Dem. Labour Party, Ukrainian SRs and United Jewish Socialist Labour Party (S.S. and E.S.)	4,219	0.45	0	0.00
List 3 - Christian Democratic Party	3,797	0.40	0	0.00
List 18 - All-Russian Soc.-Dem. Organization "Unity"	1,823	0.19	0	0.00
List 11 - Central Committee of the Russian Radical Democratic Party	413	0.04	0	0.00
List 10 - People's Development League	386	0.04	0	0.00
List 13 - Women's Union for Motherland	318	0.03	0	0.00
List 5 - Universal League of National Associations of Socialist-Universalists	158	0.02	0	0.00
Total:	942,334	100.00	12	100.00

Deputies Elected
Kutler	Kadet
Milyukov	Kadet
Rodichev	Kadet
Vinaver	Kadet
Cherepanov	Bolshevik
Evdokimov	Bolshevik
Kalinin	Bolshevik
Stalin	Bolshevik
Unszlicht	Bolshevik
Zinoviev	Bolshevik
Kamkov	SR
Shreider	SR

==== Moscow City ====
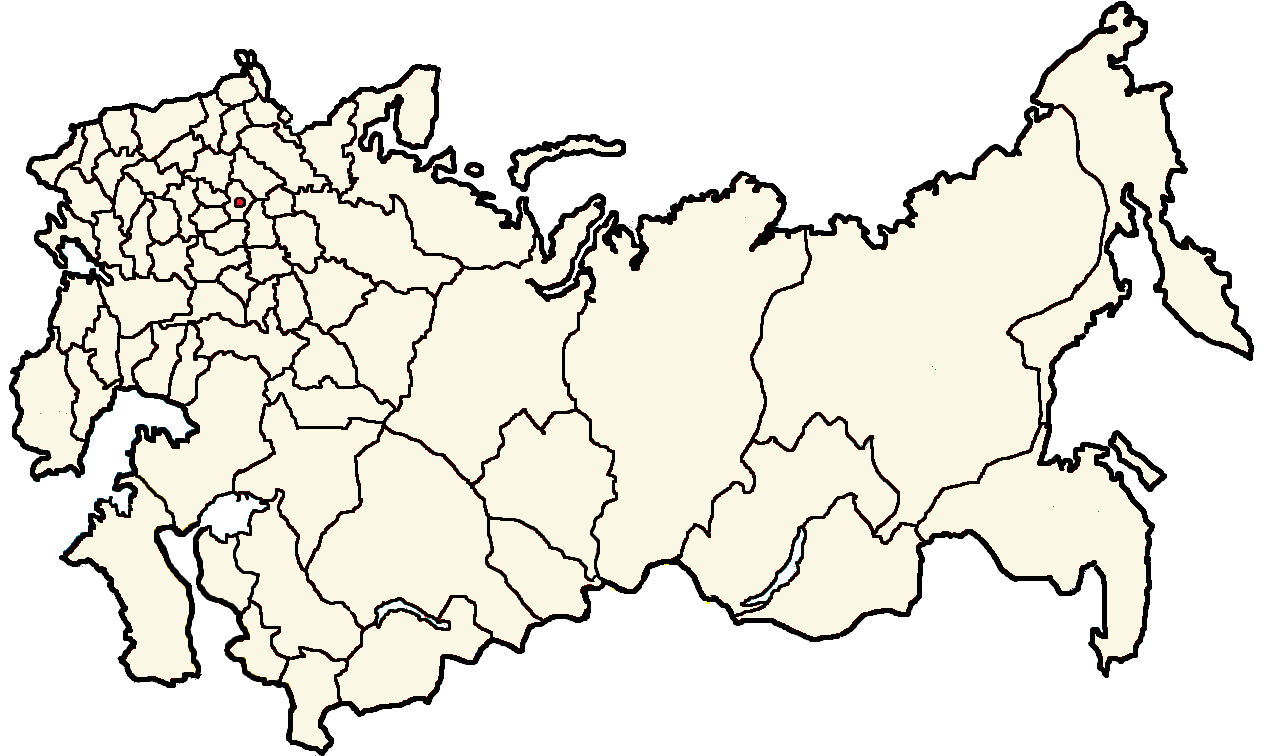
Moscow Metropolis electoral district

The electoral district covered the city of Moscow, separate from Moscow Governorate. Voter turnout in the city was estimated at between 65.4% and 69.7%.

Moscow City
Party	Vote	%	Seats	%
List 5 - Bolsheviks	366,148	47.88	6	54.55
List 1 - Kadets	263,859	34.50	4	36.36
List 3 - Socialist-Revolutionaries	62,260	8.14	1	9.09
List 8 - Democratic Socialist Bloc (incl. Cooperative, Unity)	35,305	4.62	0	0.00
List 4 - Mensheviks	19,690	2.57	0	0.00
List 9 - Labour Non-Party Group (Rightists, ex-Octobrists)	4,085	0.53	0	0.00
List 7 - Popular Socialists	2,508	0.33	0	0.00
List 2 - National-Socialist Bloc (Ukrainian Socialist Bloc and Nationalist Bloc)	2,346	0.31	0	0.00
List 12 - Commercial-Industrial Group	2,300	0.30	0	0.00
List 11 - All-Russian Peasants Union	2,279	0.30	0	0.00
List 6 - Commonwealth of Nations (mainly Germans)	2,076	0.27	0	0.00
List 10 - United Internationalists	1,907	0.25	0	0.00
Total:	764,763		11	

Deputies Elected
Astrov	Kadet
Kokoshkin	Kadet
Maklakov	Kadet
Novgorodtsev	Kadet
Minor	SR
Bukharin	Bolshevik
Ignatov	Bolshevik
Meshcheryakov	Bolshevik
Skvortsov-Stepanov	Bolshevik
Smidovich	Bolshevik
Yaroslavsky	Bolshevik

=== North ===
==== Arkhangelsk ====
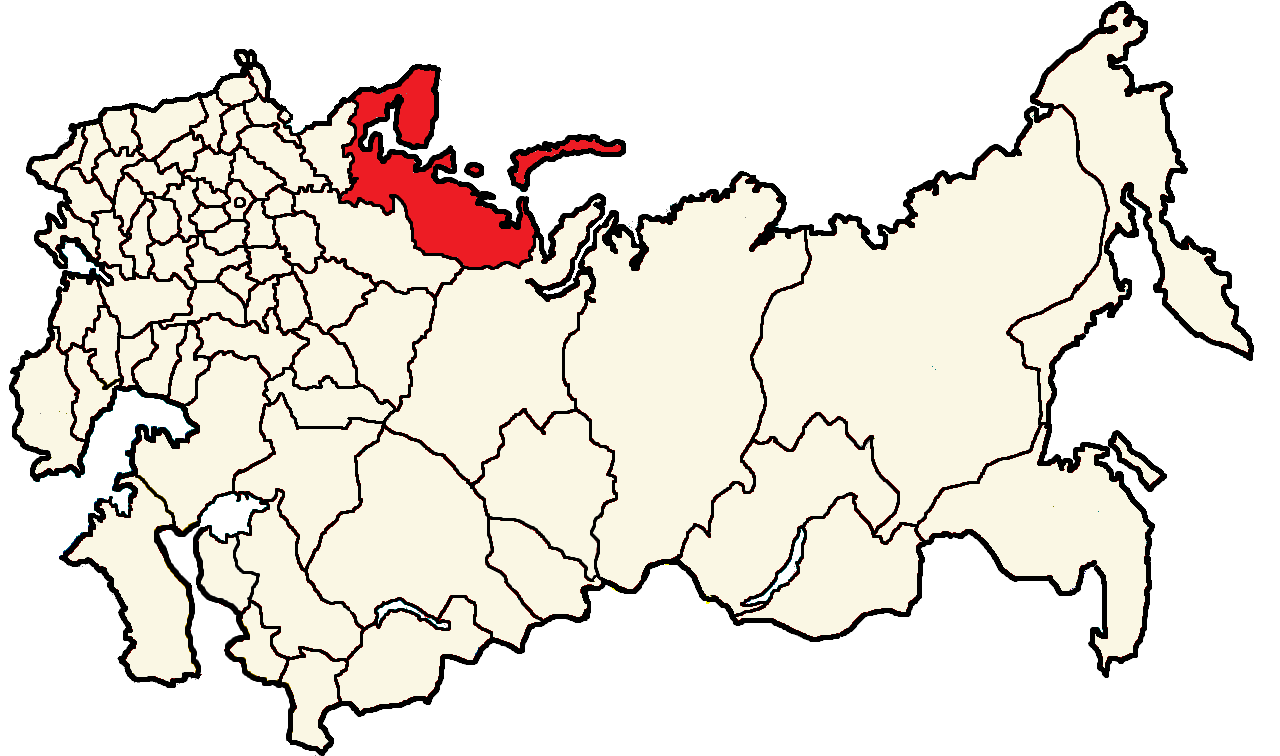

The electoral district covered the Arkhangelsk Governorate. Radkey's account is missing 4 uezds, representing some 25% of the electorate the Archangel electoral district.

Notably, Arkhangelsk had a different electoral system than the rest of the country, as voters voted for individual candidates rather than party lists. Five parties had fielded their candidates in the constituency; The Kadets fielded Aleksander Isupov and Viktor Bartenev, the Socialist-Revolutionaries (supported by the Peasants' Deputies Soviet) fielded Alexey Ivanov and Mikhail Kvyatkovsky, the Bolsheviks fielded Matvei Muranov and Georgy Oppokov and the Mensheviks fielded Anatoli Zhidkov and Vladimir Bustrem. Pavel Osipov was nominated by a group of citizens from Kurlev volost in Kholmogory uezd.

Arkhangelsk
Party	Vote	%	Seats	%
List 3 - Socialist-Revolutionaries and Soviet of Peasants' Deputies	85,272	66.81	2	100.00
List 5 - Bolsheviks	21,779	17.06		
List 1 - Kadets	12,086	9.47		
List 2 - Mensheviks	7,335	5.75		
List 3 - Citizens Group of Kurlev volost	1,160	0.91		
Total:	127,632		2	

Deputies Elected
Ivanov	SR
Kvyatkovskiy	SR

==== Olonets ====
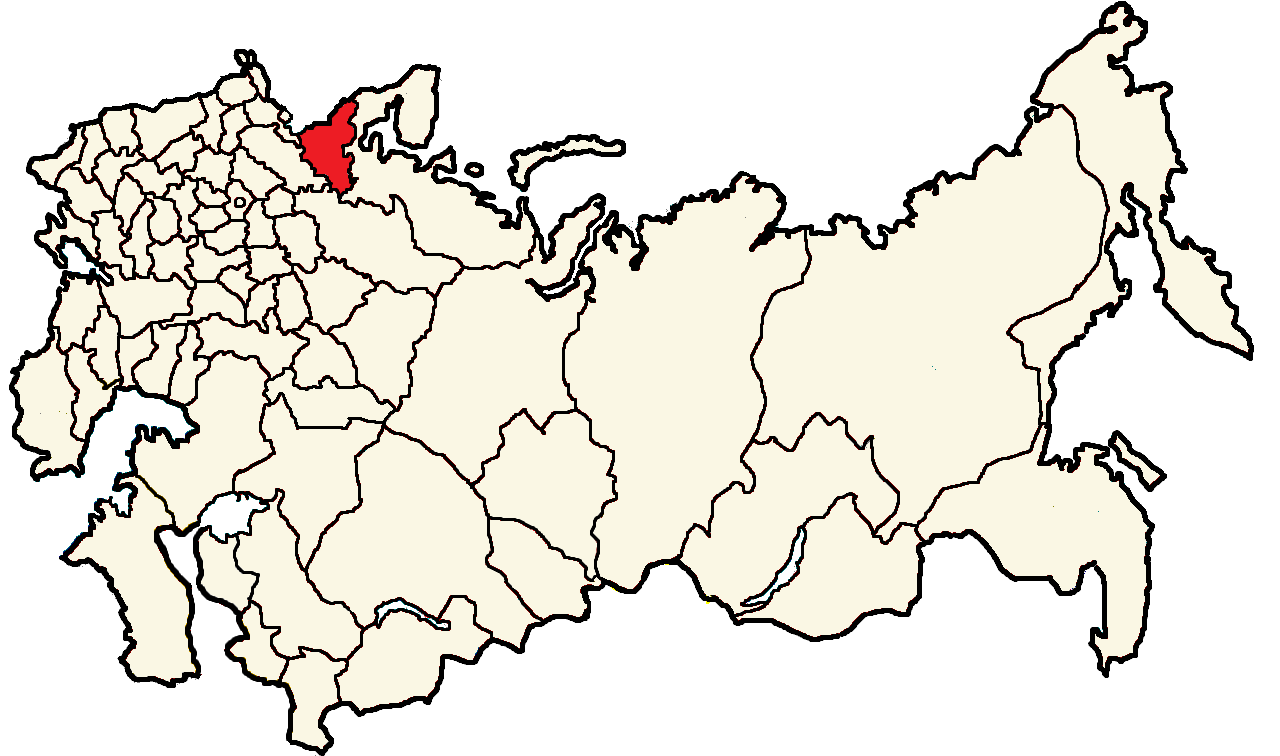

The electoral district covered the Olonets Governorate. Olonets had special electoral system, electing 2 deputies and with each voter having 2 votes.

Olonets
Uezd	Matveev (SR)	Shishkin (Menshevik)	Melekhov (Kadet)	Deyakonov (Kadet)	Mirokhin (Unity)
Petrozavodsk town	4,515	4,498	1,829	1,600	262
Petrozavodsk uezd	21,123	21,057	3,624	3,367	517
Olonets	12,057	11,918	3,159	3,069	480
Lodeynoye Pole	15,542	15,442	2,142	2,092	191
Povenets	10,864	10,846	1,621	1,553	144
Kargopol	35,129	35,382	3,394	3,290	536
Pudozh	10,806	10,783	2,414	2,186	446
Vytegra	17,084	16,901	2,095	1,994	237
Total:	127,120 (elected)	126,827 (elected)	20,278	19,151	2,813

Deputies Elected
Matveev	SR-Menshevik bloc
Shishkin	SR-Menshevik bloc

==== Vologda ====
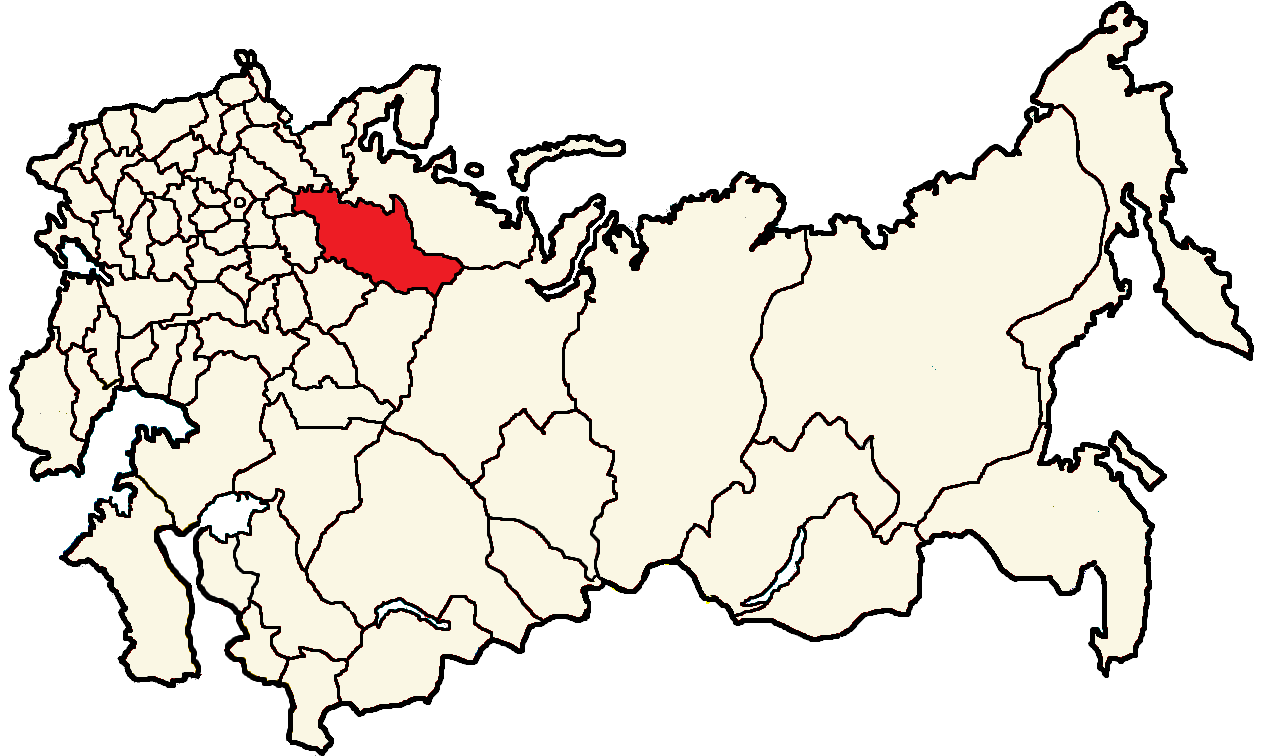

The electoral district covered the Vologda Governorate. Out of the 10 uezds in Vologda electoral district, the account of Rakdey has 1 uezds with a largely incomplete vote count and gaps in coverage in another 2 uezds.

In Vologda the Bolsheviks and Mensheviks had a common list. Soviet sources indicated that Social Democratic list was dominated by the Bolsheviks.

Vologda
Party	Vote	%	Seats	%
List 1 - Socialist-Revolutionaries and Soviet of Peasants' Deputies	320,528	75.79	6	85.71
List 2 - Social Democrats (Bolsheviks/Mensheviks)	67,650	16.00	1	14.29
List 4 - Kadets	22,912	5.42		
List 3 - Popular Socialists	8,071	1.91		
List 5 - Unity	3,742	0.88		
Total:	422,903		7	

Deputies Elected
Galkin	SR
Koryakin	SR
Maslov	SR
Raschesaev	SR
Sorokin	SR
Yuretsky	SR
Vetoshkin	Bolshevik

=== North-Western ===
==== Petrograd ====
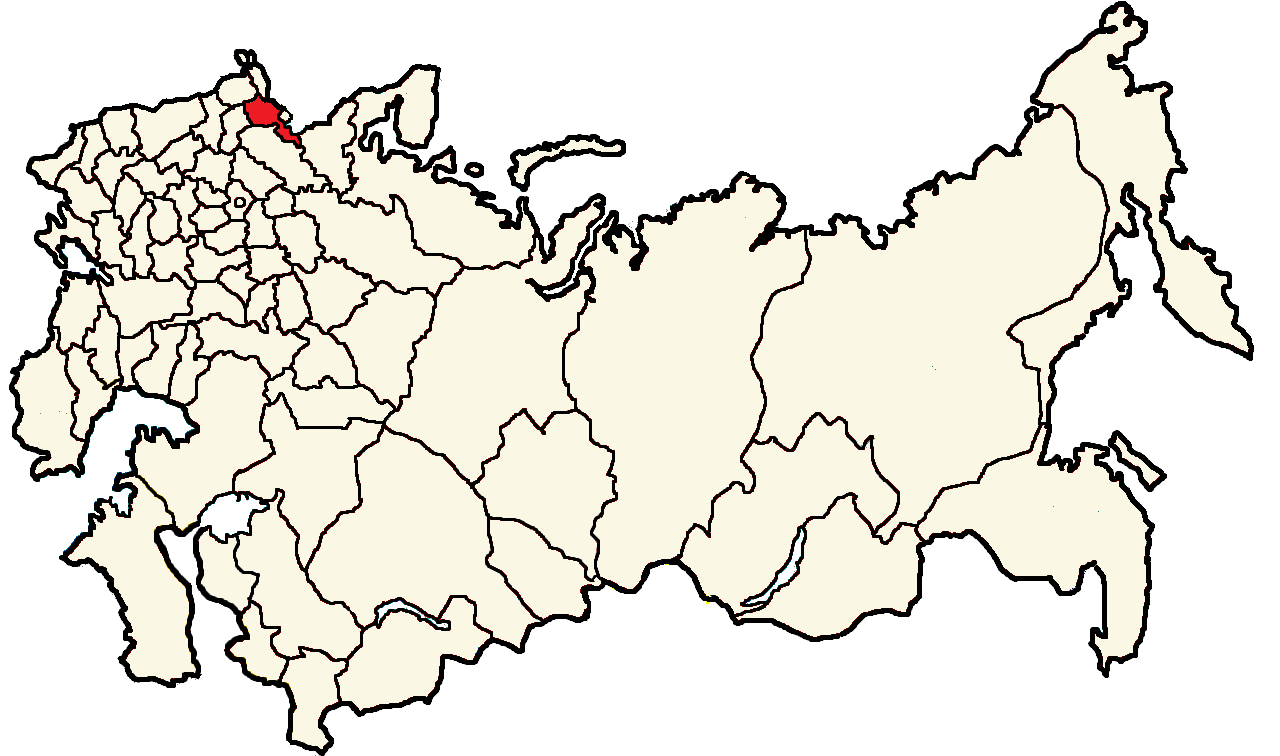

The electoral district covered the Petrograd Governorate, except for the capital city itself. According to Radkey his account of the result available was incomplete, as data was missing for 7 minor lists. Radkey's account totals 446,273 votes, including 451 unaccounted votes. Soviet historian Spirin has the same account for the three major lists, but adds another 25,462 votes for the smaller lists. Spirin's account is used for the results table below.

Petrograd
Party	Vote	%	Seats	%
List 2 - Bolsheviks	229,698	48.69	5	62.50
List 10 - Socialist-Revolutionaries	119,761	25.39	2	25.00
List 1 - Kadets	64,859	13.75	1	12.50
List 4 - Estonian List	15,963	3.38		
List 5 - Finnish Socialists	14,807	3.14		
List 8 - Popular Socialists	12,048	2.55		
List 3 - Mensheviks	6,100	1.29		
List 7 - Petrograd Governorate Union of Orthodox Parishes	5,661	1.20		
List 9 - Petrograd organizations of the Ukrainian Soc.-Dem. Labour Party, Ukrainian SRs and the United Jewish Socialist Labour Party (S.S. and E.S.)	1,997	0.42		
List 6 - Cooperative Group	841	0.18		
Total:	471,735		8	

Deputies Elected
Nabokov	Kadet
Vysotsky	SR
Zenzinov	SR
Nimvitsky	Bolshevik
Pozern	Bolshevik
Raskolnikov	Bolshevik
Shotman	Bolshevik
Voskov	Bolshevik

==== Pskov ====
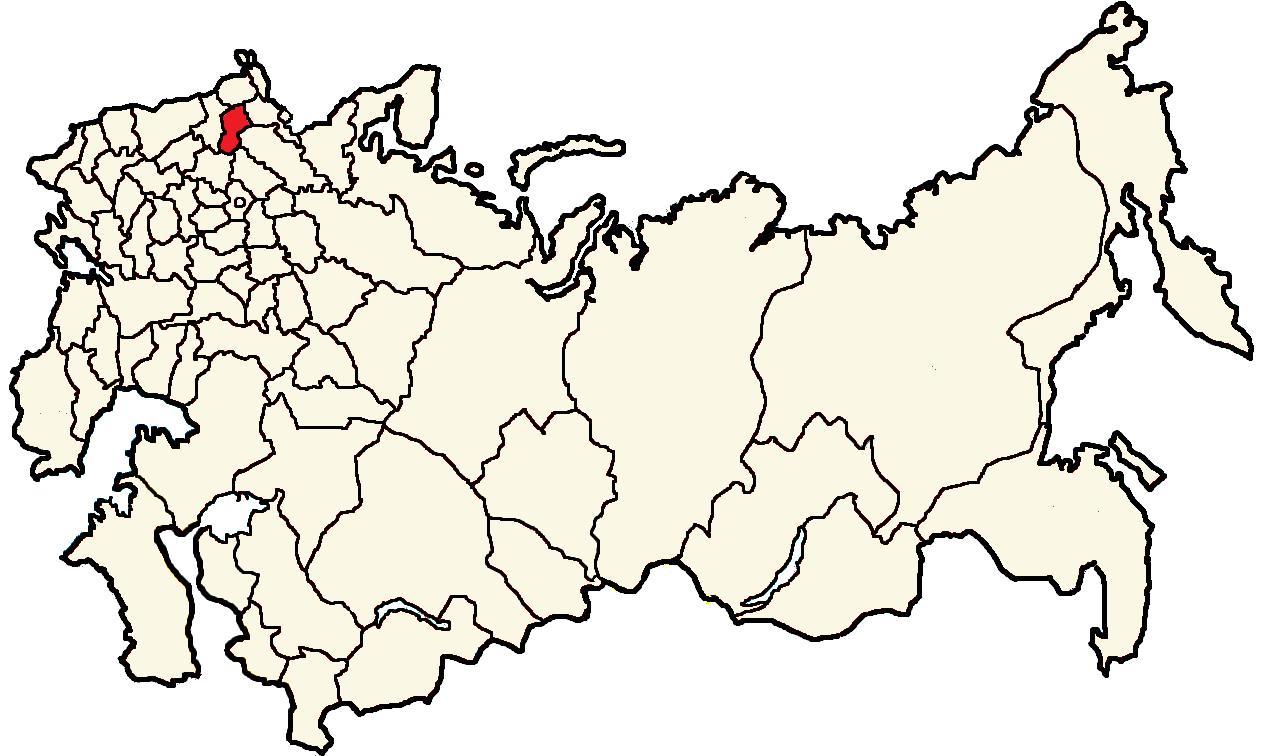

The electoral district covered the Pskov Governorate. There was a 60.3% voter turnout in the district.

Pskov
Party	Vote	%	Seats	%
List 3 - Socialist-Revolutionaries and Soviet of Peasants Deputies	295,012	57.25	5	62.50
List 6 - Bolsheviks	173,631	33.69	3	37.50
List 2 - Kadets	25,961	5.04		
List 4 - Mensheviks	4,870	0.95		
List 1 - Popular Socialists and Toiling Peasants	4,059	0.79		
List 8 - Lettish Peasant Union and Lettish Radical Democratic Party	3,859	0.75		
List 5 - Pskov Provincial Union of Landowners	3,209	0.62		
List 9 - All-Russian League for Women's Equality	2,366	0.46		
List 7 - Pskov United Democratic Groups of Townspeople, Peasants and Workers	2,337	0.45		
Total:	515,304		8	

Deputies Elected
Bekleshov	SR
Olkhin	SR
Pokrovsky	SR
Safonov	SR
Utkin	SR
Joffe	Bolshevik
Usharnov	Bolshevik
Yurov (Okhotin)	Bolshevik

==== Novgorod ====
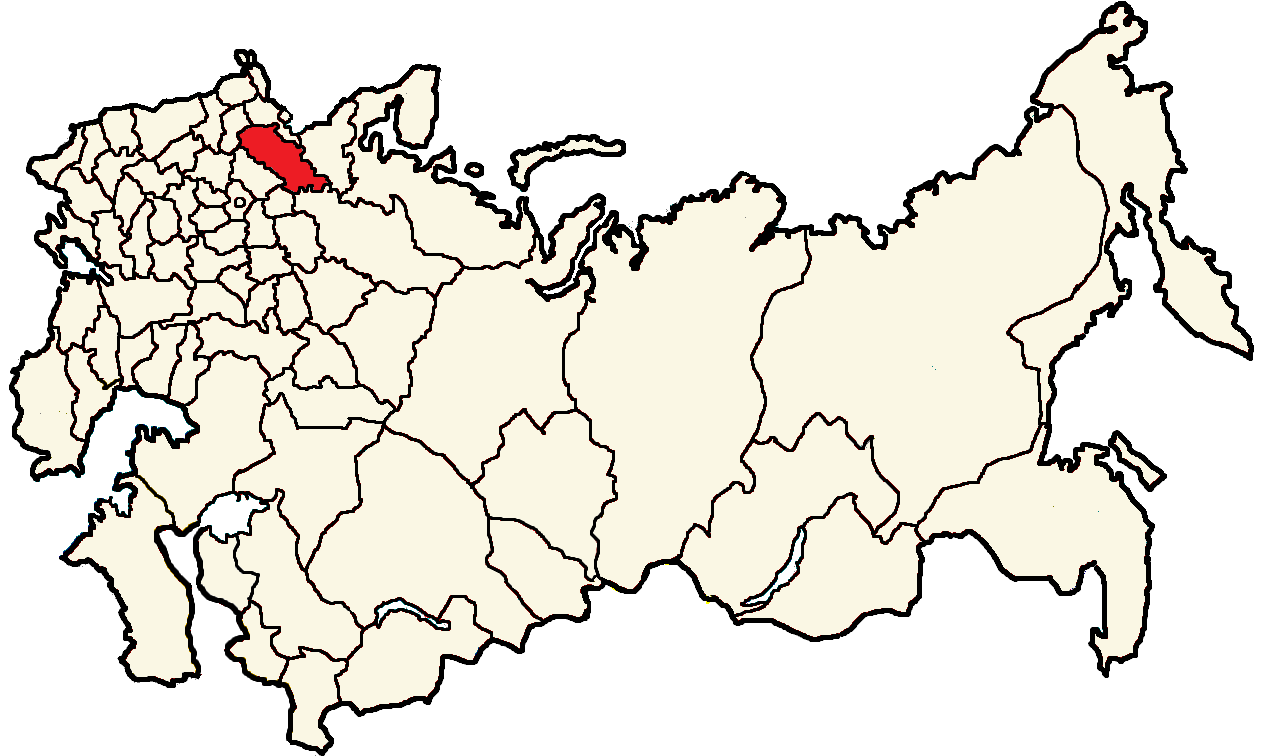

The electoral district covered the Novgorod Governorate. Whilst Novgorod was an agrarian province, the Bolsheviks obtained a good vote. This might have been due to the fact that many inhabitants were accustomed to perform seasonal work in nearby Petrograd. 4 local peasants lists did not qualify to run in the election.

Novgorod
Party	Vote	%	Seats	%
List 4 - Socialist-Revolutionaries	220,665	45.36	4	44.44
List 6 - Bolsheviks	203,658	41.87	5	55.56
List 3 - Kadets	31,484	6.47		
List 1 - Popular Socialists	10,314	2.12		
List 9 - Mensheviks	9,336	1.92		
List 7 - Union of Landowners	7,804	1.60		
List 2 - Homeowners and Landowners of Novgorod Governorate	1,178	0.24		
List 8 - Union of Cooperativists	1,123	0.23		
List 5 - Unity	860	0.18		
Total:	486,422		9	

Deputies Elected
Gukovsky	SR
Kobyakov	SR
Leontiev	SR
Sokolov	SR
Ermakov	Bolshevik
Pashin	Bolshevik
Trotsky	Bolshevik
Uritsky	Bolshevik
Valentinov	Bolshevik

=== Baltics ===
==== Estonia ====
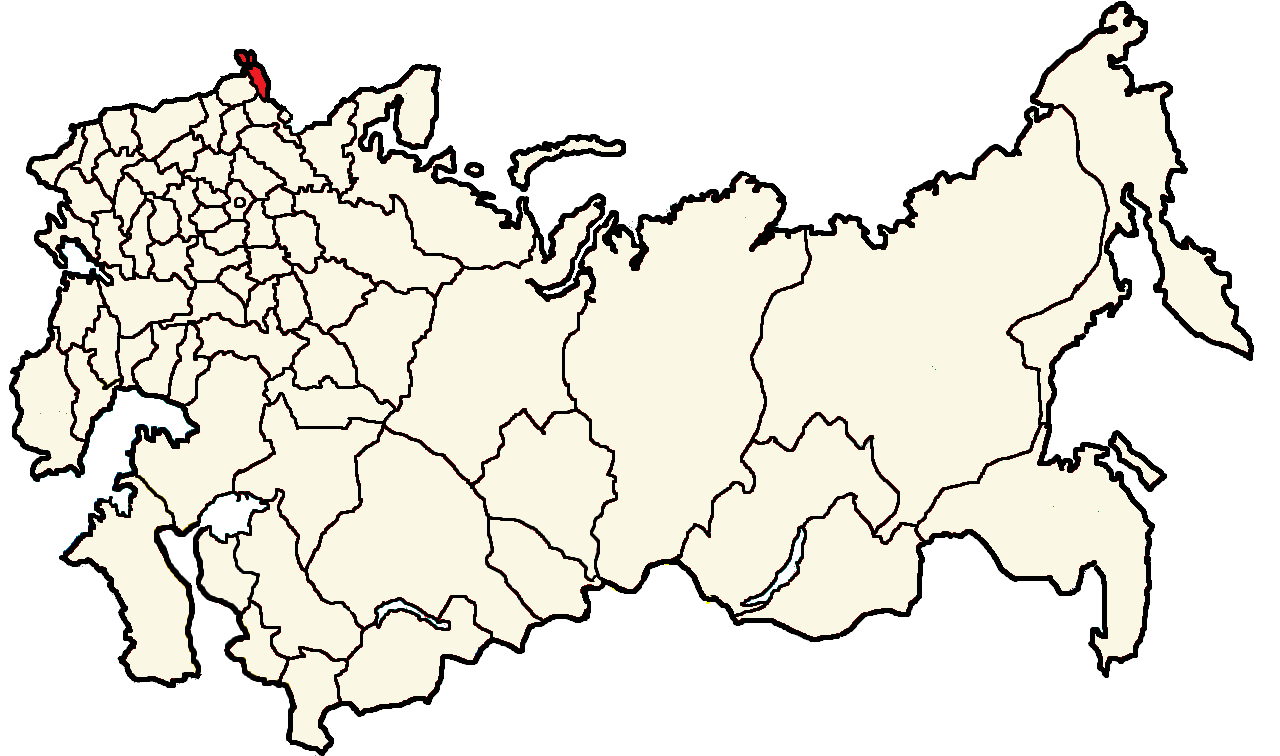

The electoral district covered the Autonomous Governorate of Estonia.

Voter turnout stood at 56.6% in the Estonia electoral district. The Bolsheviks and Estonian Labour Party had their strongest support in Reval and northern Estonia. Bolsheviks obtained 47.6% of the votes cast in Reval. The Democratic Bloc obtained 53.4% in Tartu, and did also get a good number of votes in southern Estonia. Notably, the Bolsheviks benefited from popular discontent with the failure of the Provisional Government to follow through on its promises of self-determination for Estonia.

Soldiers stationed at garrisons in Estonia didn't vote in the Estonian district, but in the Baltic Fleet constituency.

Estonia
Party	Vote	%	Seats	%
List 2 - Bolsheviks	119,863	39.98	4	50.00
List 7 - Estonian Democratic Bloc (Estonian Democratic Party and Estonian Land Union)	68,085	22.71	2	25.00
List 3 - Estonian Labour Party	64,704	21.58	2	25.00
List 1 - Estonian SRs	17,726	5.91		
List 6 - Estonian Radical Democratic Party and Peasants Union	17,022	5.68		
List 4 - Estonian SDs	9,244	3.08		
List 5 - Socialist-Revolutionaries	3,200	1.07		
Total:	299,844		8	

Deputies Elected
Anvelt	Bolshevik
Pöögelmann	Bolshevik
Rabchinsky	Bolshevik
Vakmann	Bolshevik
Seljamaa	Estonian Labour
Vilms	Estonian Labour
Poska	Estonian Democratic
Tõnisson	Estonian Democratic

==== Livonia ====
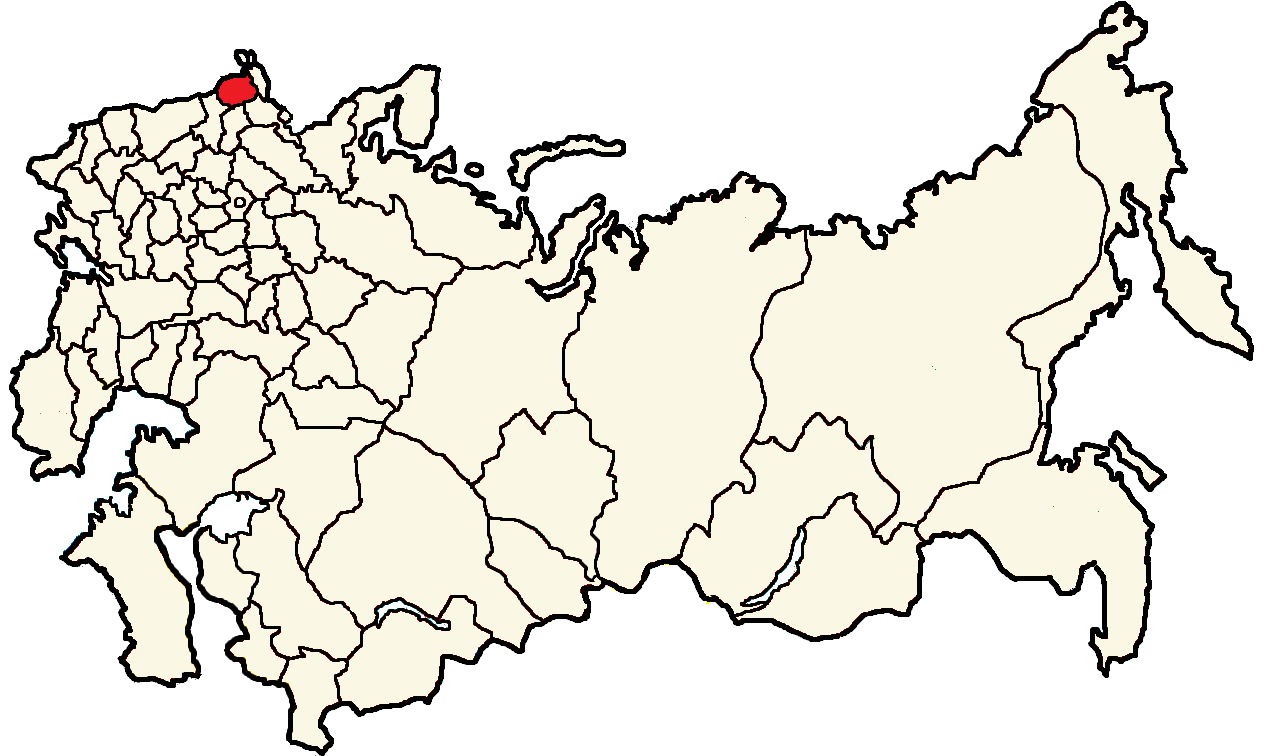

The electoral district covered the Livonia Governorate, as well as the parts of the Courland Governorate not under German occupation. However, at the time Riga was under German occupation so no vote took place there.

In Radkey's account some 9,000 votes are missing from 9 uezds.

Livonia
Party	Vote	%	Seats	%
Bolsheviks	97,781	71.86	3	75.00
Lettish Peasants Union	31,253	22.97	1	25.00
Mensheviks	7,046	5.18	0	0.00
Total:	136,080	100.00	4	100.00

Deputies Elected
Goldmanis	Lettish Peasant Union
Berzin	SD of Latvian Territory
Peterson	SD of Latvian Territory
Rozin	SD of Latvian Territory

=== White Russia ===
==== Vitebsk ====
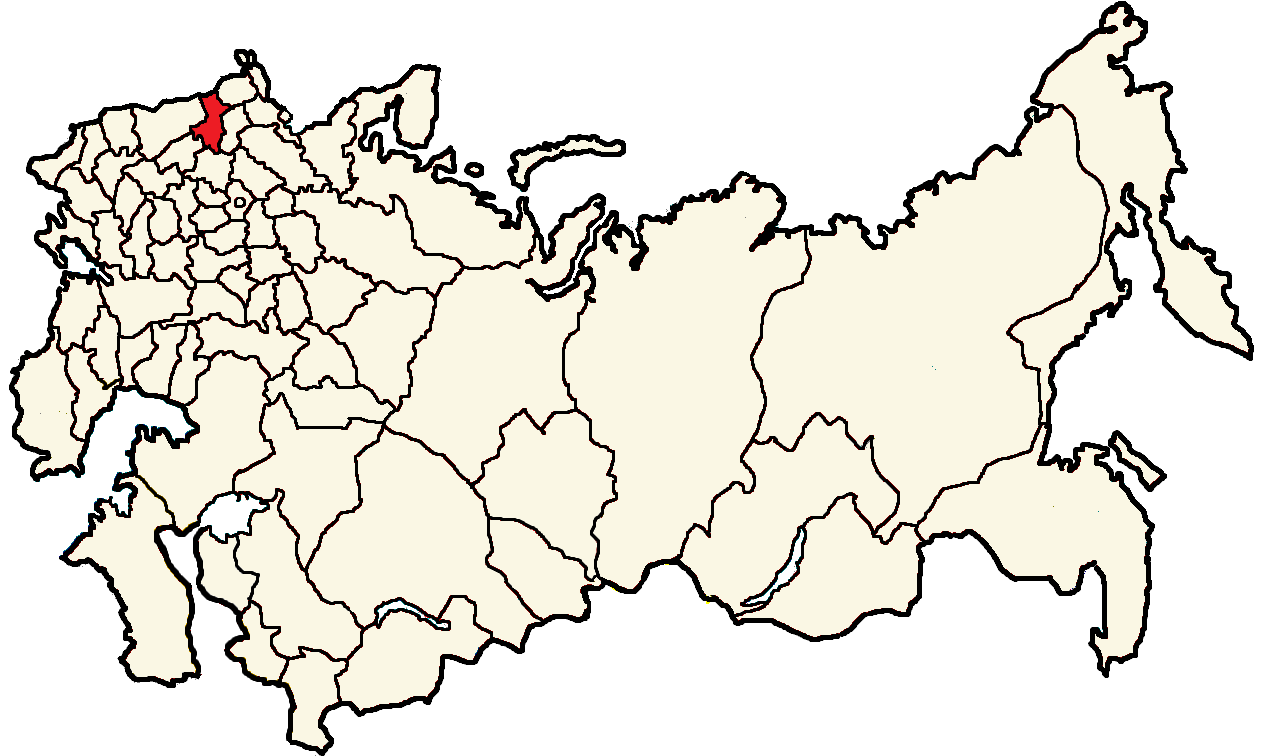

The electoral district covered the Vitebsk Governorate.

Vitebsk
Party	Vote	%	Seats
List 5 - Bolsheviks	287,101	51.22	6
List 1 - Socialist-Revolutionaries	150,279	26.81	3
List 11 - Socialist-Federalists and Peasants of Latgale	26,990	4.82	
List 7 - Jewish National Electoral Committee	24,790	4.42	
List 9 - Mensheviks-Bund	12,471	2.22	
List 10 - United Polish Organizations	10,556	1.88	
List 13 - Peasants of Vitebsk Governorate	9,752	1.74	
List 6 - Vitebsk Belarusian People’s Union and Orthodox Parishes of the Faith of the Polotsk Diocese	9,019	1.61	
List 3 - Kadets	8,132	1.45	
List 8 - Landowners and Old Believers	6,098	1.09	
List 12 - Lettish Democrats-Nationalists	5,881	1.05	
List 4 - Latgallian Popular Committee and Latgallian Socialist Party of Working People	5,118	0.91	
List 2 - Popular Socialists	3,599	0.64	
List 14 - Citizens of Boletskii Volost of Gorodsky Uezd	752	0.13	
Total:	560,538		9

Deputies Elected
Boldysh	SR
Bulota	SR
Gizetti	SR
Ceshejko-Sochacki	Bolshevik
Dzerzhinsky	Bolshevik
Kamenev	Bolshevik
Pinson	Bolshevik
Rivkin	Bolshevik
Sarkisyants	Bolshevik

==== Minsk ====
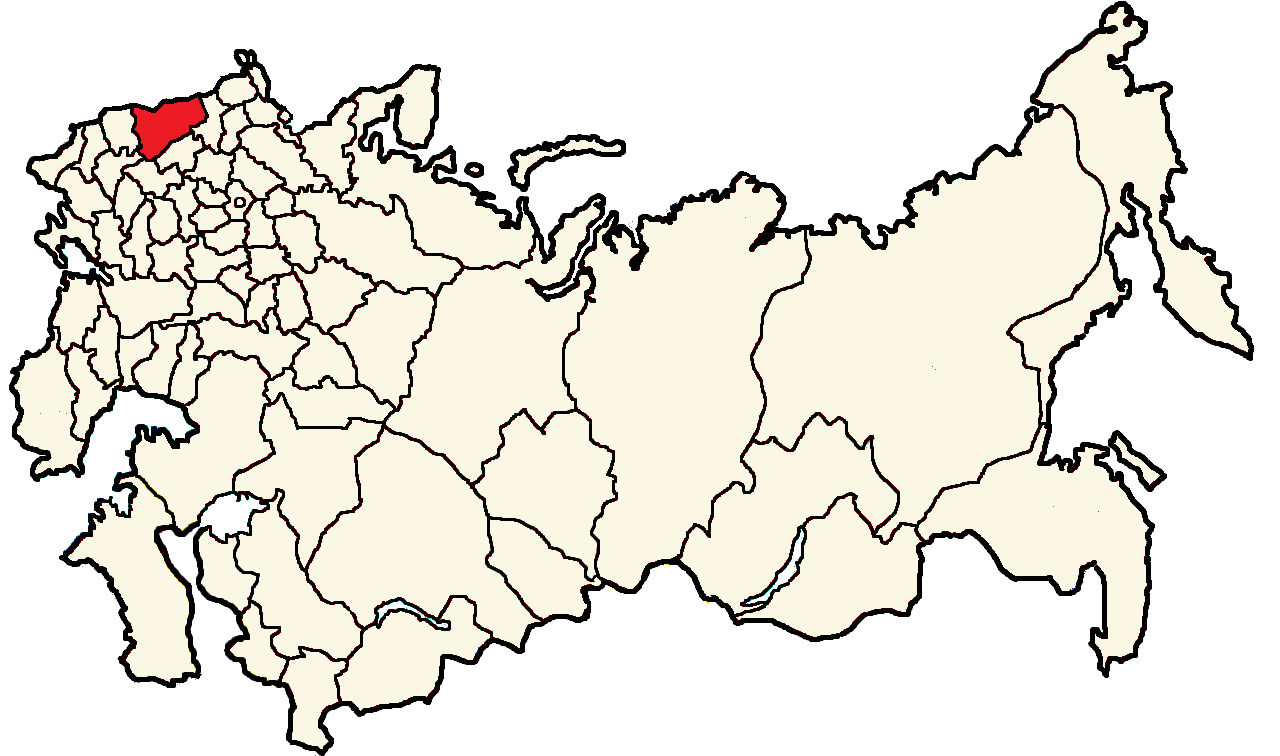

The electoral district consisted of the Minsk Governorate and the parts of the Vilna Governorate and the Kovno Governorate that were not under German occupation. Notably, the soldiers based in the garrison in Minsk voted in the Western Front electoral district rather than the Minsk electoral district. According to Radkey, his count of the result in Minsk is largely complete, only lacking 3 out of 25 volosts Mozyr uezd. These 3 volosts had 16,755 eligible voters.

Minsk
Party	Vote	%
List 9 - Bolsheviks	579,087	63.13
List 12 - Bloc of Socialist-Revolutionaries and the Soviet of Peasants Deputies	181,673	19.81
List 2 - Jewish National Electoral Committee	65,046	7.09
List 8 - Polish Electoral Committee	36,882	4.02
List 5 - Mensheviks-Bund	16,277	1.77
List 6 - Kadets	10,724	1.17
List 11 - Russian Democratic Party	10,040	1.09
List 10 - Jewish Soc.-Dem. Labour Party (Poalei Zion)	6,184	0.67
List 1 - United Socialist Jewish Labour Party (S.S. and E.S.)	4,880	0.53
List 3 - Union of Landowners	3,465	0.38
List 13 - Belarusian Socialist Assembly	2,998	0.33
Total:	917,256	

Deputies Elected
Balay	SR
Drizo	SR
Gamzagurdi	SR
Nesterov	SR
Brutzkus	Jewish National Electoral Committee
Alibekov	Bolshevik
Freiman	Bolshevik
Gromashevsky	Bolshevik
Kozhuro	Bolshevik
Krivoshein	Bolshevik
Lander	Bolshevik
Schlegel	Bolshevik
Seleznev	Bolshevik
Taganov	Bolshevik

==== Mogilev ====
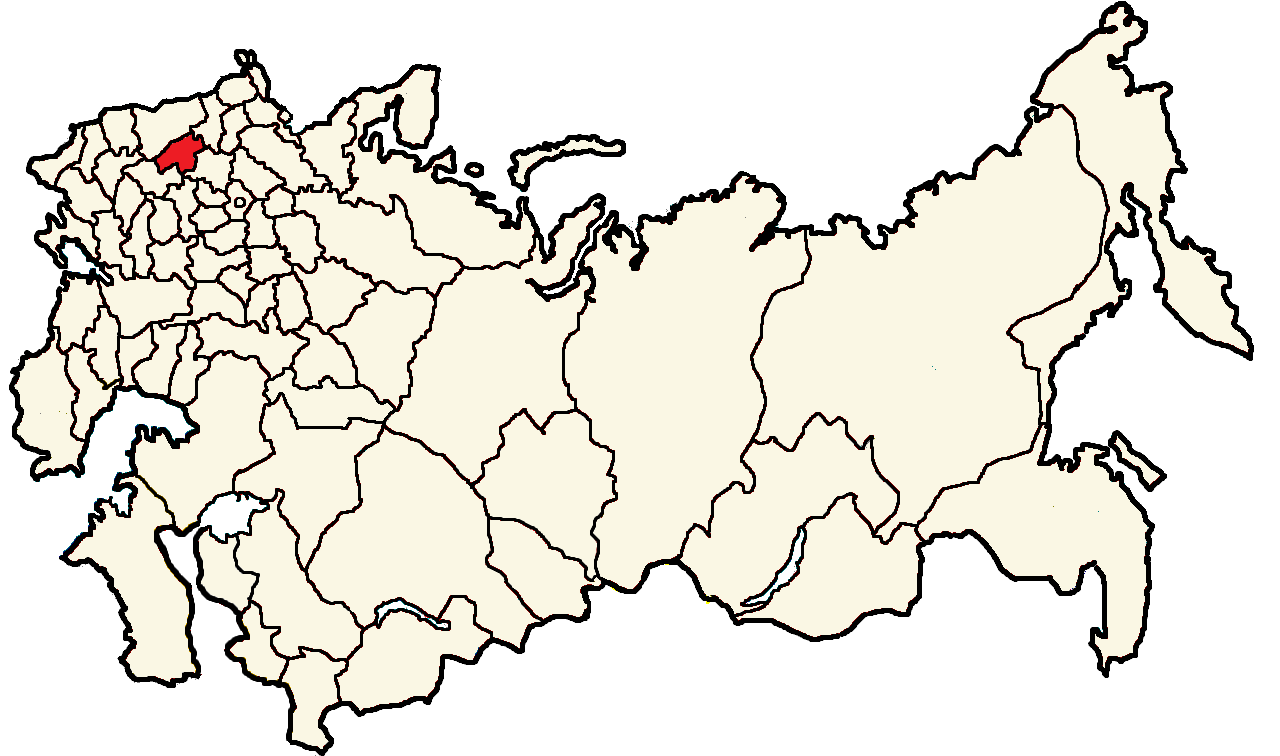

The electoral district covered the Mogilev Governorate.

According to Radkey the vote count in Mogilev is largely incomplete. He claims to have the data for Gomel (with the votes for all 11 lists), Mogilev (with votes for the 7 most voted lists) and Orsha (with votes for the 6 most votes lists) towns as well as 80 precincts in Gomel uezd (but in these precincts, only the vote for SR and Bolshevik lists). The account of Soviet historian L. M. Spirin, shown to the right in the table and which Radkey did not consider reliable, includes a much greater number of votes accounted for the Mogilev electoral district.

Mogilev
Party	Vote (Radkey)	% (Radkey)	Vote (Spirin)	% (Spirin)
List 1 - Socialist-Revolutionaries and Soviet of Peasants Deputies	50,684	37.55	511,998	70.62
List 11 - Bolsheviks	28,446	21.07	93,060	12.83
List 6 - Kadets	14,494	10.74	19,316	2.66
List 9 - Jewish National Electoral Committee	14,101	10.45	42,037	5.80
List 2 - Mensheviks-Bund	10,549	7.81	21,664	2.99
List 4 - Jewish Soc.-Dem. Labour Party (Poalei Zion)	7,900	5.85	2,596	0.36
List 10 - Mogilev Governorate Polish Council	4,635	3.43	15,981	2.20
List 3 - United Jewish Socialist Labour Party (S.S. and E.S.)	1,583	1.17	4,004	0.55
List 8 - White Russian Organizations	1,385	1.03	2,523	0.35
List 5 - Union of Landowners	293	0.22	10,136	1.40
List 7 - Yidishe Folkspartei and Non-Party Democratic Committee			1,737	0.24
Unaccounted	924	0.68		
Total:	134,994		725,052	

Deputies Elected
Buslov	SR
Khrisanenkov	SR
Kovarsky	SR
Maleev	SR
Malyshitsky	SR
Rappoport	SR
Shishaev	SR
Tsvetaev	SR
Vasilevsky	SR
Voronov	SR
Zakrevsky	SR
Zasorin	SR
Kaganovich	Bolshevik
Leplevsky	Bolshevik
Friedman	Jewish National Committee
Mazeh	Jewish National Committee

==== Smolensk ====
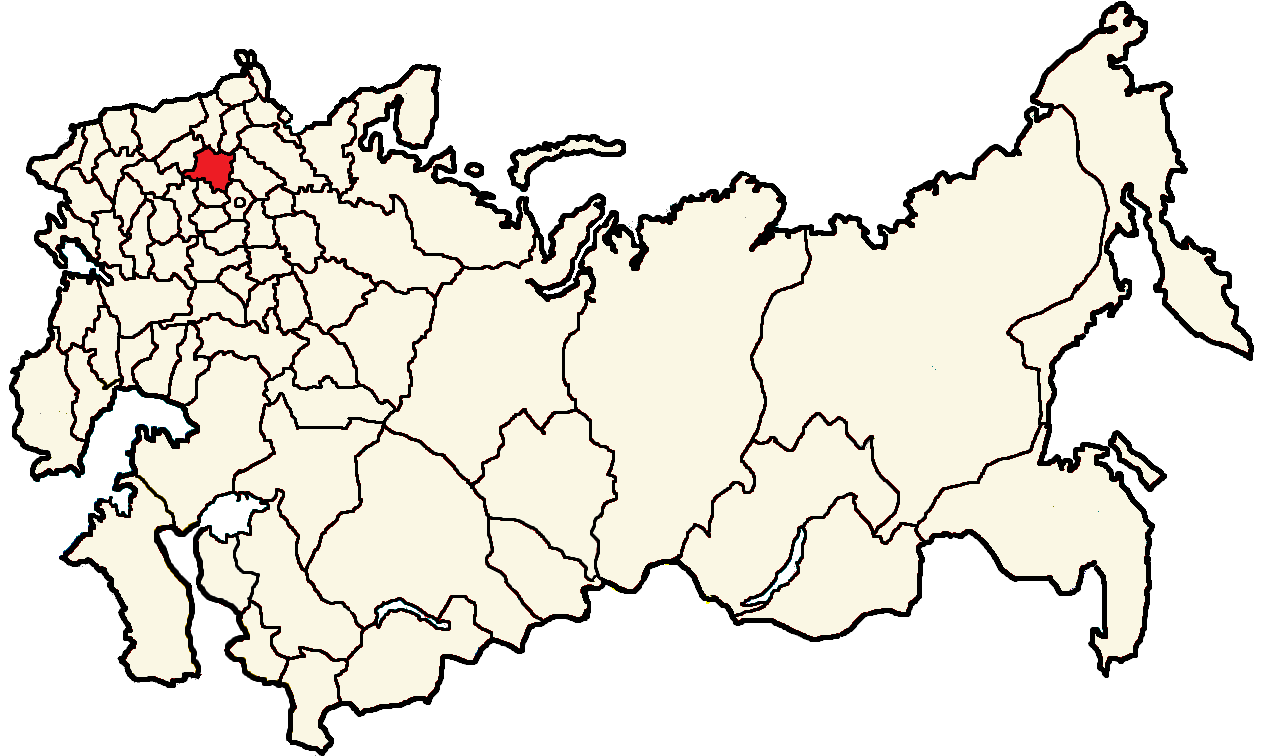

The electoral district covered the Smolensk Governorate. 2 volost-level lists were barred from participating in the election. List no. 3, endorsed by Smolensk Provincial Council of SR Party and the Smolensk Provincial Congress of Peasants Deputies, was headed by E.K. Breshko-Breshkovskaia and Andrei Argunov. The Socialist-Revolutionary and Menshevik lists formed an electoral bloc. Likewise Lists 2 and 4 formed an electoral bloc.

The Bolsheviks won some 75% of the vote in the rural Sychevka uezd, obtaining 23,984 out of 32,007 votes cast in the uezd.

Smolensk
Party	Vote	%	Seats
List 7 - Bolsheviks	361,062	54.85	6
List 3 - Socialist-Revolutionaries and Soviet of Peasants Deputies	250,134	38.00	4
List 1 - Kadets	29,274	4.45	
List 6 - Mensheviks	7,901	1.20	
List 8 - [Orthodox] Parish Non-Party Group	5,300	0.81	
List 4 - Popular Socialists	2,210	0.34	
List 5 - Nationalist Bloc	1,708	0.26	
List 2 - Group Allied with Socialist Parties	645	0.10	
Total:	658,234		10

Deputies Elected
Argunov	SR
Egorov	SR
Kutuzov	SR
Podvitsky	SR
Bobiński	Bolshevik
Ivanov	Bolshevik
Leszczyński	Bolshevik
Lunacharsky	Bolshevik
Pokrovsky	Bolshevik
Remizov	Bolshevik

=== Central Industrial Region ===
==== Moscow ====
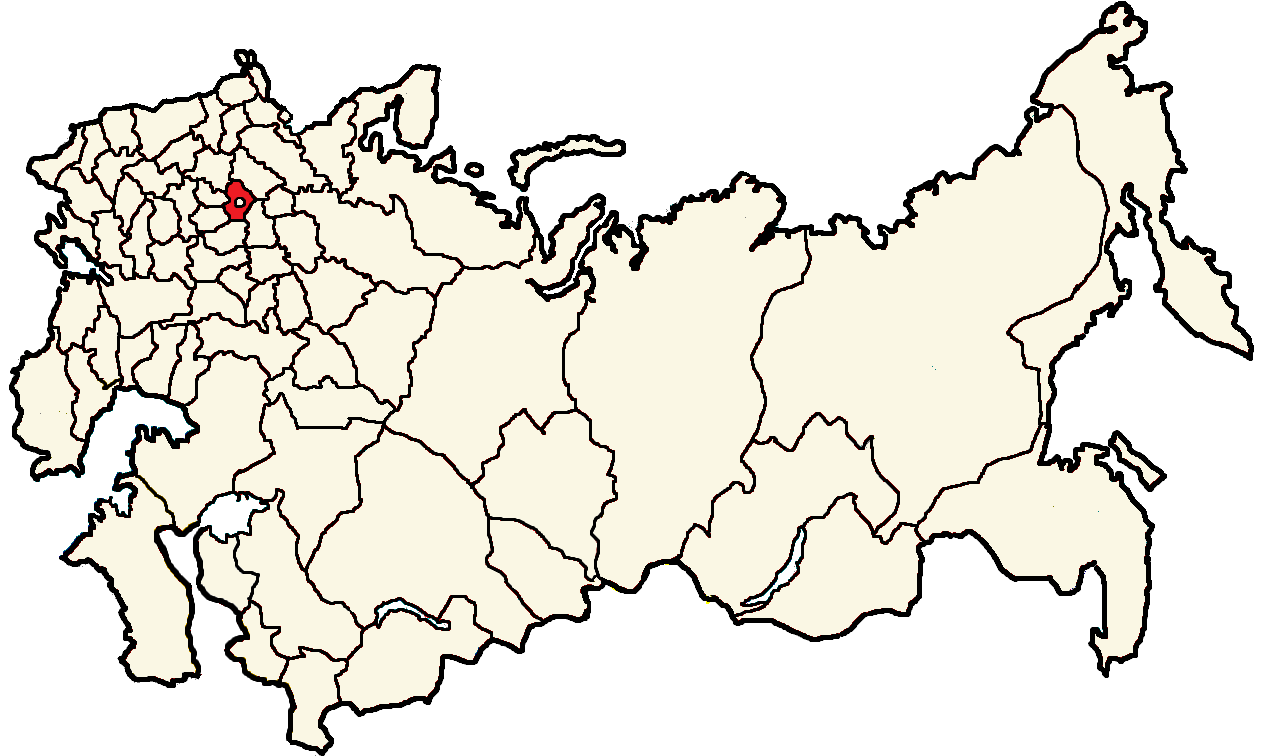

The electoral district covered the Moscow Governorate, except for the city of Moscow. According to Radkey's account, only few votes are missing from the summary (one military voting box in Moscow uezd, the votes from a single volost in Bronnitsy uezd and the votes for smaller parties in Serpukhov uezd).

Moscow Province
Party	Vote	%
List 5 - Bolsheviks- Menshevik-Internationalists	351,853	56.43
List 3 - Socialist-Revolutionaries	159,630	25.60
List 1 - Kadets	43,295	6.94
List 4 - Mensheviks	27,108	4.35
List 6 - All-Russian Peasants Union	12,967	2.08
List 10 - Group of Public Figures (rightists)	8,443	1.35
List 9 - Old Believers	7,467	1.20
List 2 - Popular Socialists	6,058	0.97
List 7 - Democratic Non-partisan Group of Members of District Committees of Sergiev Posad	4,497	0.72
List 8 - Landowners	2,189	0.35
Total:	623,507	

Deputies Elected
Dolgorukov	Kadet
Bykov	SR
Pavlov	SR
Baryshnikov	Bolshevik
Kokushkin	Bolshevik
Nogin	Bolshevik
Sapronov	Bolshevik
Smirnov	Bolshevik

==== Tver ====
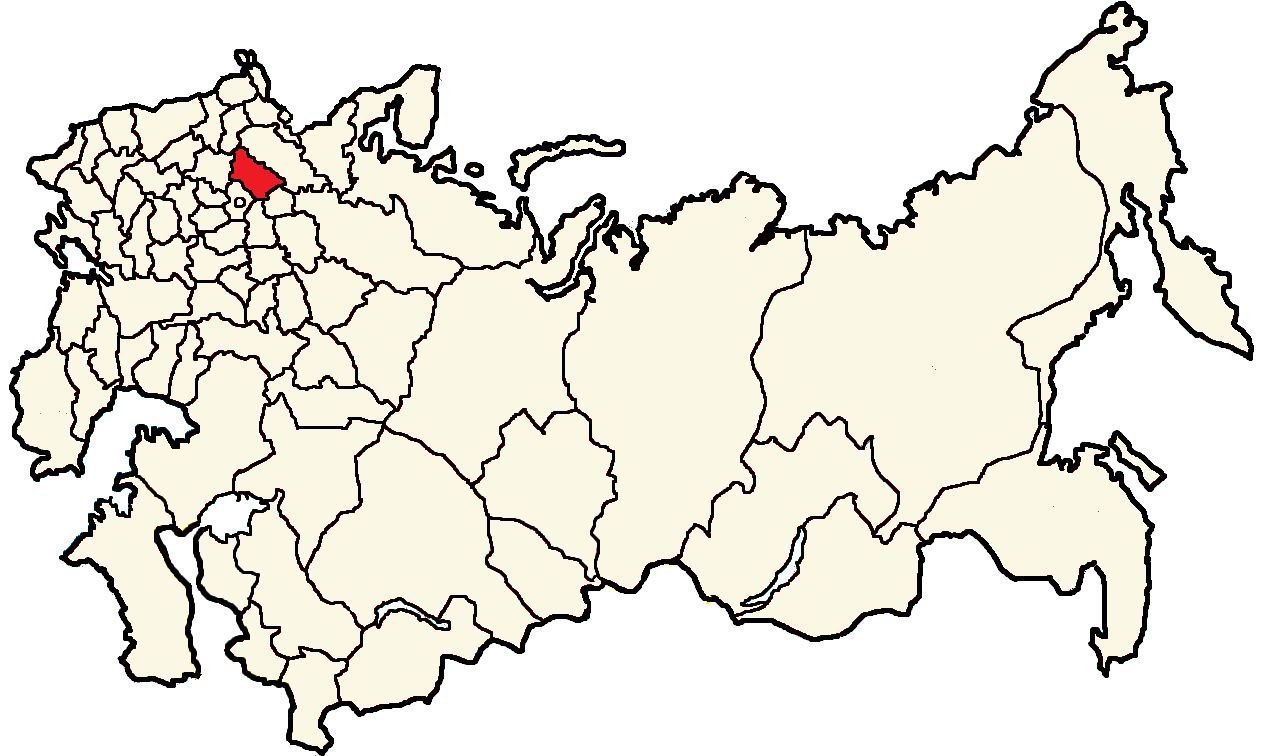

The electoral district covered the Tver Governorate. Radkey lists the Tver result as 'somewhat incomplete'.

Tver
Party	Vote	%	Seats
List 6 - Bolsheviks	362,687	59.27	6
List 3 - Socialist-Revolutionaries and Soviet of Peasants Deputies	186,030	30.40	3
List 1 - Kadets	32,830	5.37	
List 5 - Mensheviks	22,552	3.69	
List 2 - Union of Landowners	3,677	0.60	
List 7 - Popular Socialists	2,338	0.38	
List 4 - Unity and Union of Credit and Savings Associations	975	0.16	
List 8 - Commercial-Industrial Union	812	0.13	
Total:	611,901		9

Deputies Elected
Tikhomirov	SR
Tolmachevsky	SR
Volsky	SR
Arosev	Bolshevik
Bulatov	Bolsheviks
Medov	Bolshevik
Schmidt	Bolshevik
Sokolnikov	Bolshevik
Vagzhanov	Bolshevik

==== Yaroslavl ====
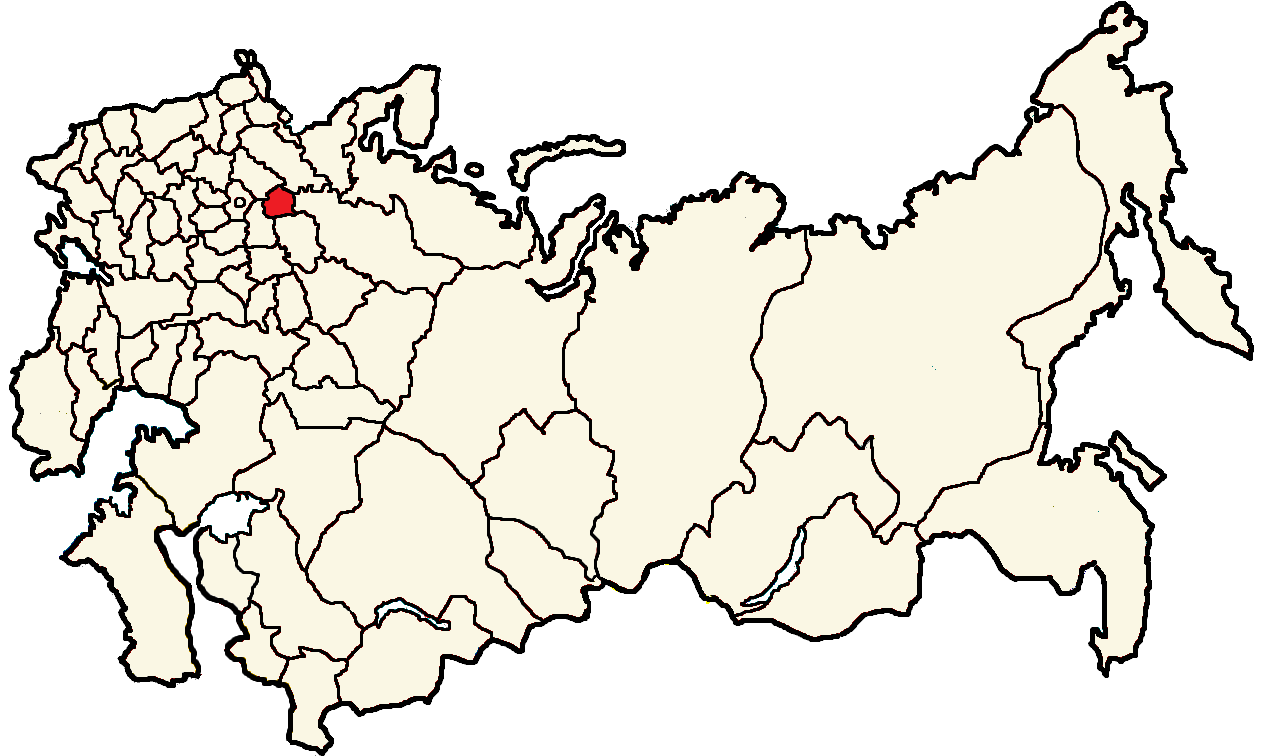

The electoral district covered the Yaroslavl Governorate.

Yaroslavl
Party	Vote	%	Seats
List 3 - Socialist-Revolutionaries and Governorate Soviet of Peasants Deputies	197,465	43.06	3
List 7 - Bolsheviks	176,035	38.39	2
List 2 - Kadets	53,730	11.72	1
List 4 - Mensheviks	16,809	3.67	
List 1 - Popular Socialists	5,637	1.23	
List 5 - Union of Landowners	4,497	0.98	
List 6 - Bloc of Traders, Industrialists, Artisans and Homeowners	4,421	0.96	
List 8 - ?	?	?	
Total:	458,594		6

Deputies elected
Konovalov	Kadet
Vishniak	SR
Kollontai	Bolshevik
Rykov	Bolshevik
Bolshakov	SR
Kilchevsky	SR

==== Kostroma ====
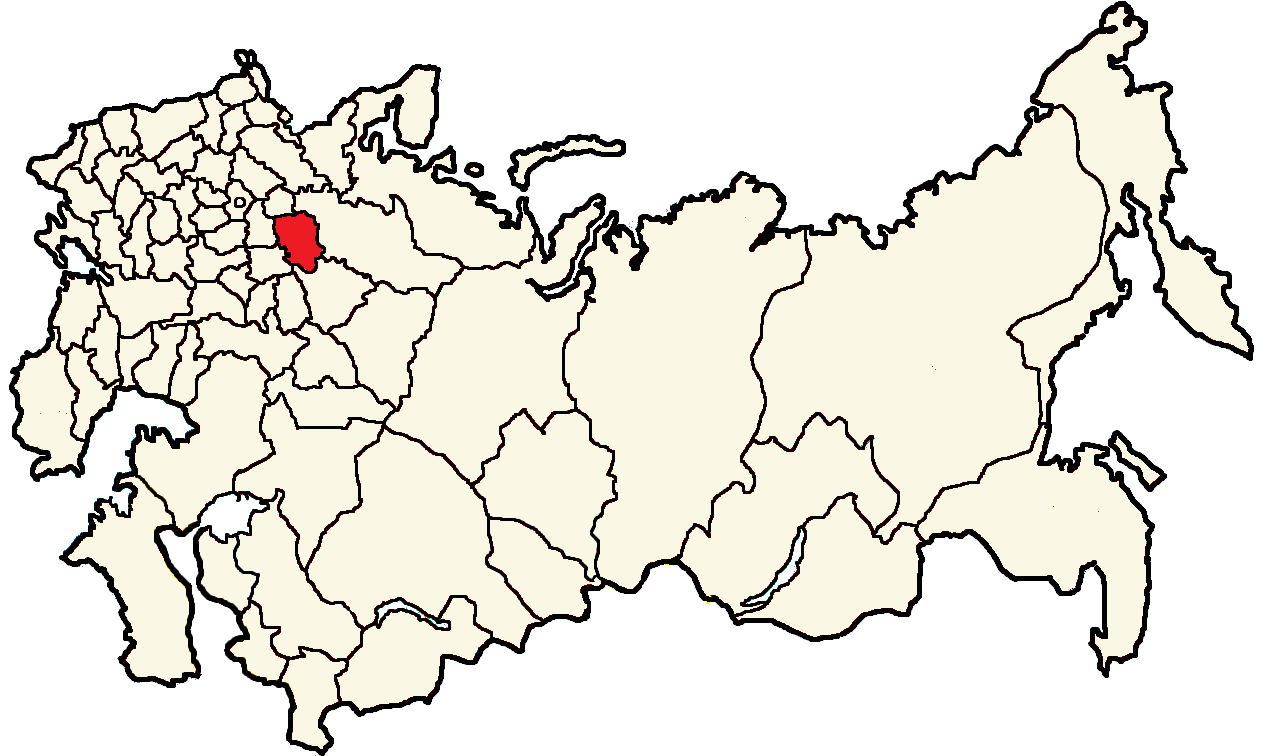

The electoral district covered the Kostroma Governorate.

Kostroma
Party	Vote	%	Seats
List 1 - Socialist-Revolutionaries and Soviet of Peasants Deputies	249,838	44.97	4
List 4 - Bolsheviks	226,905	40.84	4
List 2 - Kadets	41,448	7.46	
List 3 - Mensheviks	19,488	3.51	
List 5 - Orthodox Clergy and Laymen	17,901	3.22	
Total:	555,580		8

Deputies Elected
Kondratiev	SR
Kozlov	SR
Lotoshnikov	SR
Maltsev	SR
Danilov	Bolshevik
Larin-Lurie	Bolshevik
Malyutin	Bolshevik
Rostopchin	Bolshevik

==== Vladimir ====
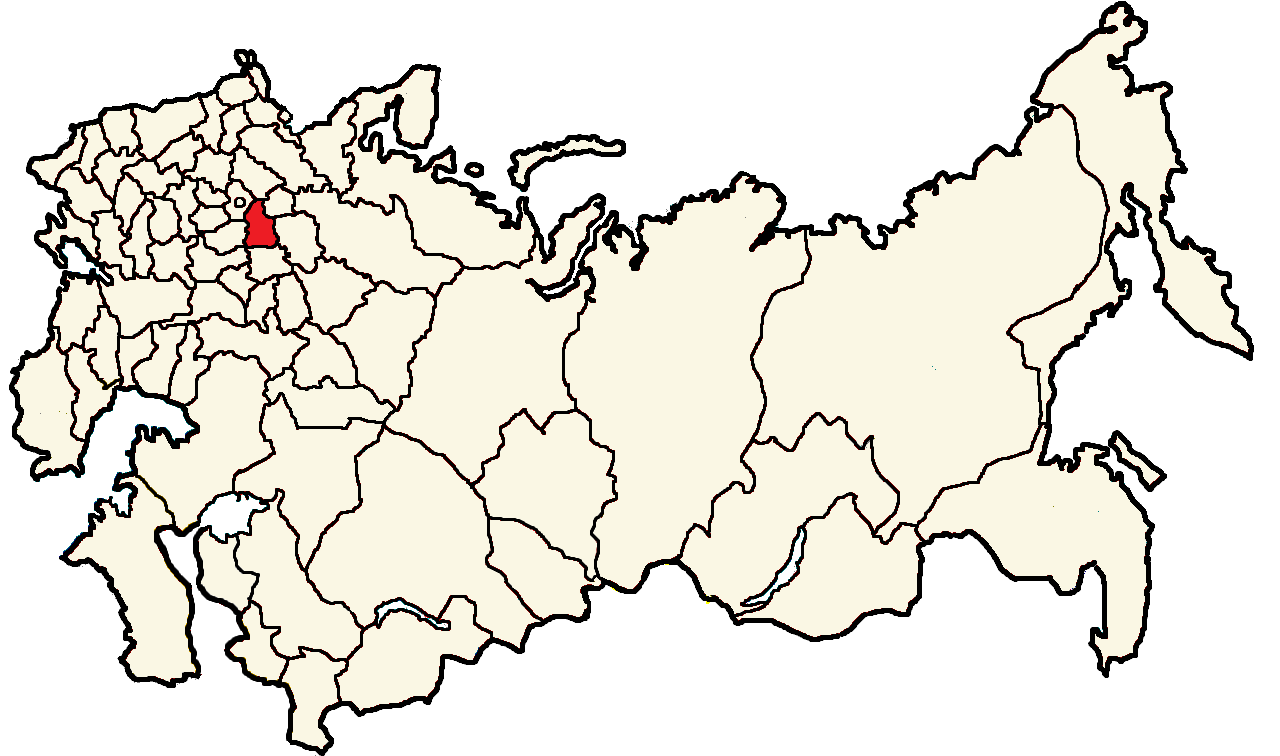

The electoral district covered the Vladimir Governorate. Vladimir was heavily industrialized, second only to Moscow itself. There were many textile mills in Ivanovo-Voznesensky, Out of 13 uezd, SR won in 2; Viazniki (east of industrial belt), an area with hemp and linen production where SRs scored 42,4%, and further east in Gorokhovets uezd, an area with no factories where SRs scored 57.4%.

Vladimir
Party	Vote	%	Seats
List 6 - Bolsheviks	337,941	55.95	6
List 3 - Socialist-Revolutionaries and Congress of Peasants Deputies	197,311	32.67	3
List 1 - Kadets	38,035	6.30	
List 4 - Mensheviks	13,074	2.16	
List 2 - Revival of Free Russia (rightists)	9,209	1.52	
List 5 - Popular Socialists	6,908	1.14	
List 7 - Cooperative	1,482	0.25	
Total:	603,960		9

Deputies Elected
Makeev	SR
Sokolov	SR
Spiridonova	SR
Frunze	Bolshevik
Kiselyov	Bolshevik
Lomov-Oppokov	Bolshevik
Lyubimov	Bolshevik
Naumov	Bolshevik
Zhidelev	Bolshevik

==== Kaluga ====
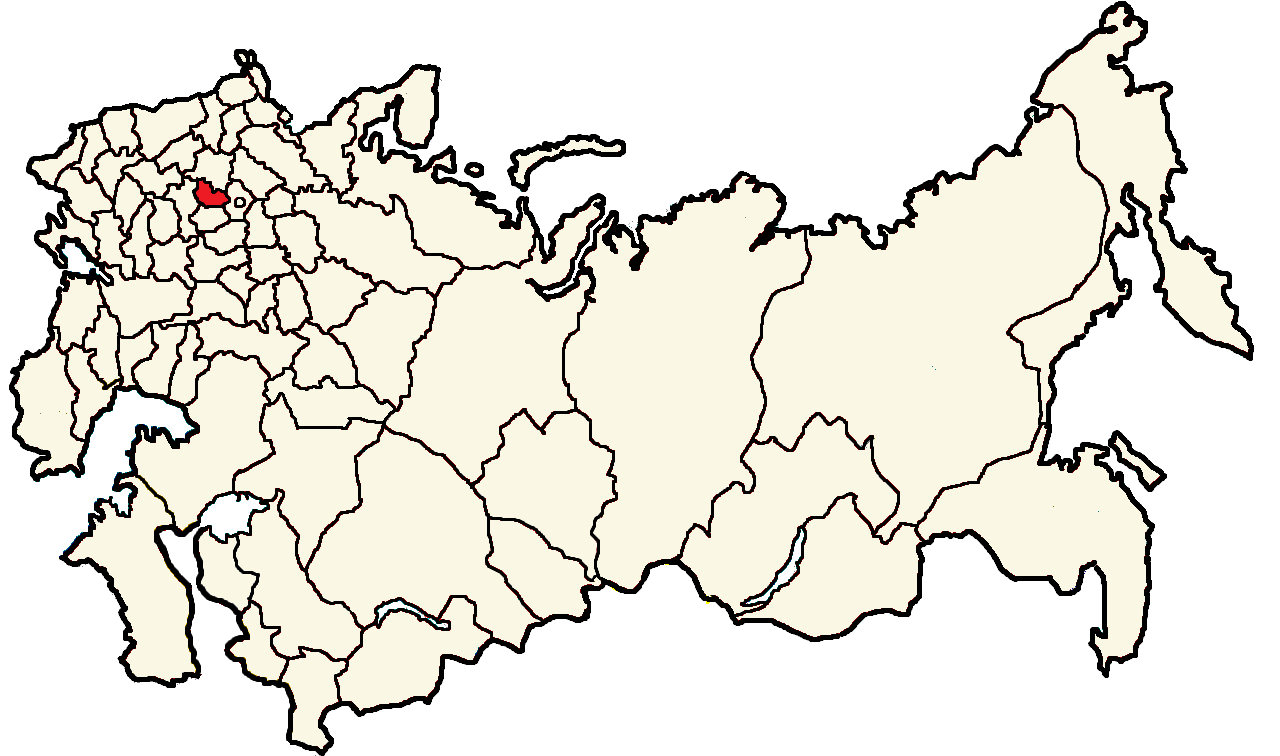

The electoral district covered the Kaluga Governorate.

Kaluga
Party	Vote	%	Seats
List 7 - Bolsheviks	225,378	57.81	5
List 2 - Socialist-Revolutionaries	127,313	32.65	3
List 3 - Kadets	24,125	6.19	
List 5 - Mensheviks	6,996	1.79	
List 4 - Old Believers	4,409	1.13	
List 6 - Belorussian Socialist Gromada	1,067	0.27	
List 1 - Popular Socialists	601	0.15	
Total:	389,889		8

Deputies Elected
Borodachov	SR
Eliseev	SR
Parol	SR
Ginzburg	Bolshevik
Glebov-Avilov	Bolshevik
Logachev	Bolshevik
Stukov	Bolshevik
Zakharov	Bolshevik

==== Tula ====
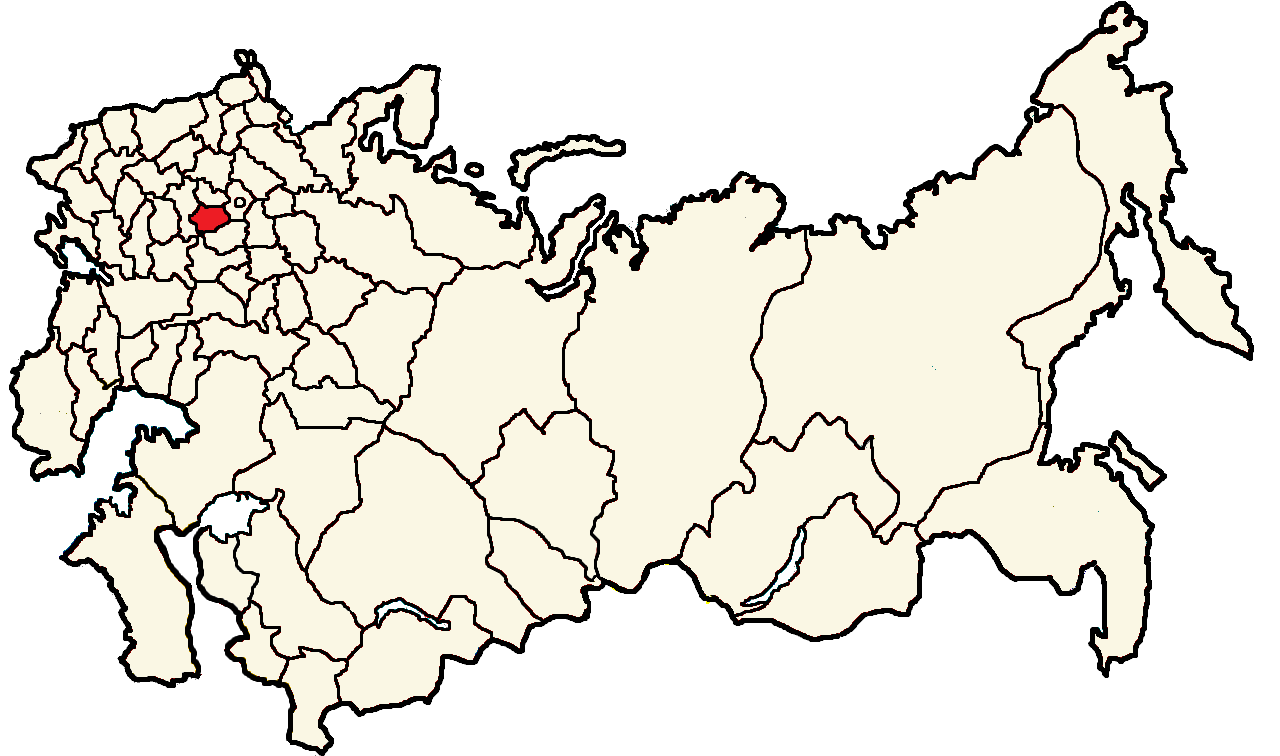

The electoral district covered the Tula Governorate. The votes from the city of Tula and 10 out 12 uezds are complete, according to Radkey. The votes from Yefremov uezd and one of the volosts of Odoyev uezd are not covered in Radkey's account.

Tula
Party	Vote	%	Seats
List 5 - Bolsheviks	219,337	45.93	4
List 1 - Socialist-Revolutionaries	216,267	45.28	4
List 2 - Kadets	21,298	4.46	
List 4 - Mensheviks	9,605	2.01	
List 7 - Commercial-Industrial	6,624	1.39	
List 6 - Popular Socialists	1,832	0.38	
List 9 - Cooperative	1,294	0.27	
List 3 - Peasants of Basavsk volost	770	0.16	
List 8 - Menshevik-Internationalists	550	0.12	
Total:	477,577		8

Deputies Elected
Arvatov	SR
Gurevich	SR
Medvedev	SR
Nearonov	SR
Kaminsky	Bolshevik
Kaul	Bolshevik
Kolesnikov	Bolshevik
Yakovleva	Bolshevik

=== Central Black Earth Region ===
==== Ryazan ====
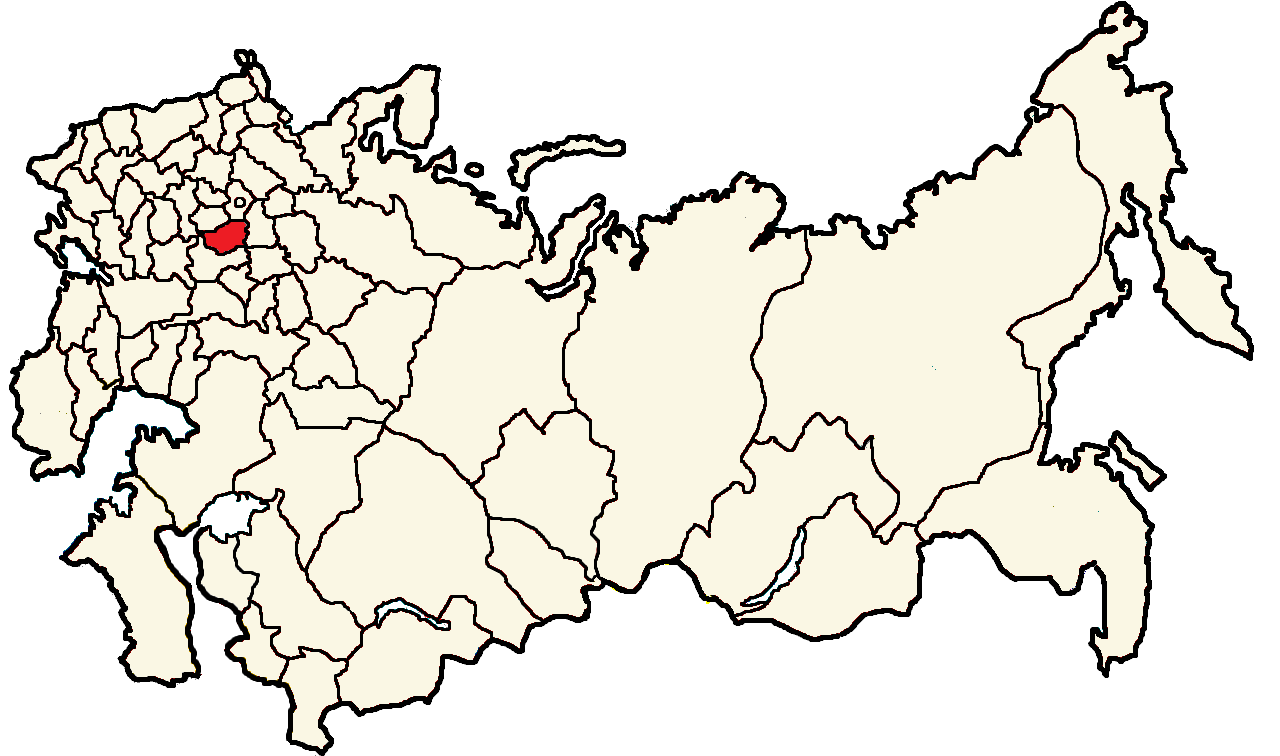

The electoral district covered the Ryazan Governorate. Radkey's account is missing the vote from Egoriev uezd, 1 out of 12 uezds in the electoral district.

Ryazan
Party	Vote	%	Seats
List 3 - Socialist-Revolutionaries and Soviet of Peasants Deputies	397,229	57.14	6
List 5 - Bolsheviks	251,815	36.22	4
List 1 - Kadets	27,808	4.00	
List 4 - Popular Socialists	5,216	0.75	
List 2 - Mensheviks	4,389	0.63	
List 7 - Bloc of Landowners and Old Believers	1,041	0.15	
List 6 - Group of Non-Party Voters	?	?	
Unaccounted	7,732	1.11	
Total:	695,230		10

Deputies Elected
Barinov	SR
Gendelman	SR
Govorov	SR
Pavlov	SR
Sorokin	SR
Sukharev	SR
Gorshkov	Bolshevik
Osinsky	Bolshevik
Sereda	Bolshevik
Voronkov	Bolshevik

==== Oryol ====
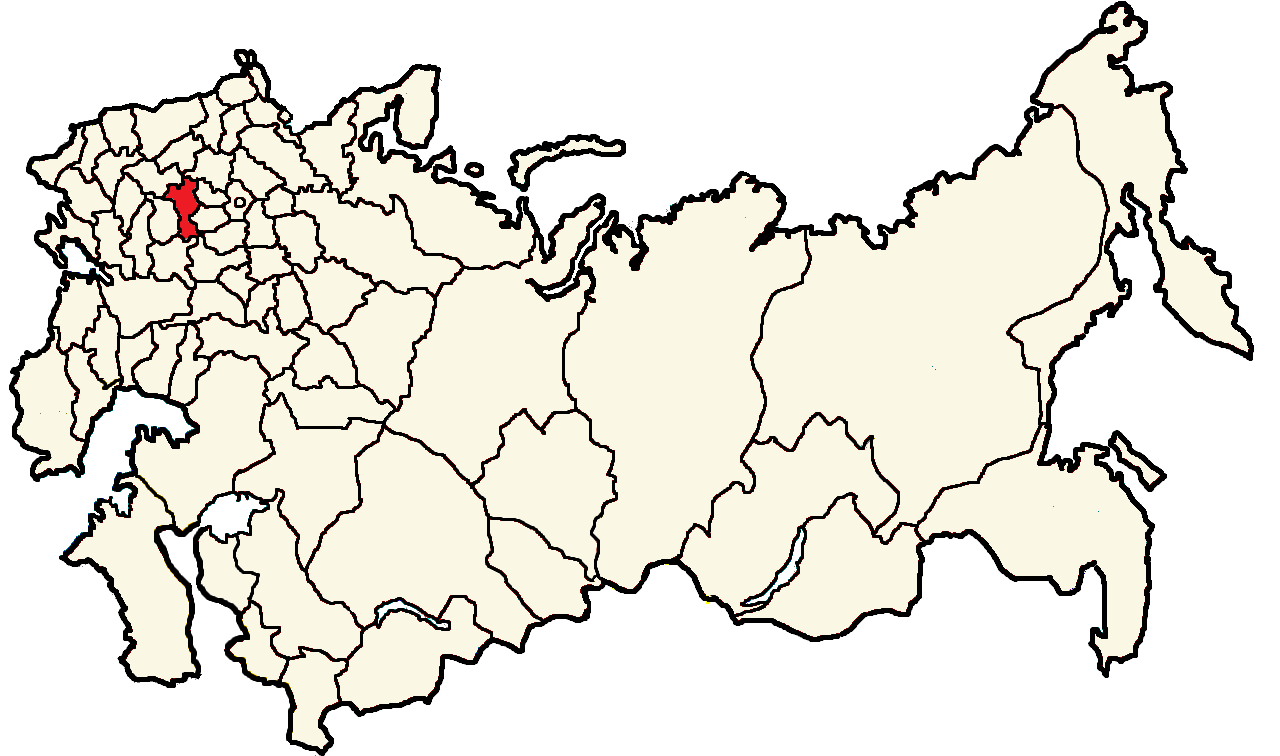

The electoral district covered the Oryol Governorate.

Oryol
Party	Vote	%	Seats
List 3 - Socialist-Revolutionaries and Soviet of Peasants Deputies	511,049	62.70	8
List 8 - Bolsheviks	241,786	29.66	4
List 2 - Kadets	18,345	2.25	
List 5 - Mensheviks	16,301	2.00	
List 6 - Union of Landowners	12,911	1.58	
List 4 - Commercial-Industrial Union	4,462	0.55	
List 7 - Unity, Cooperators and Popular Socialists	1,384	0.17	
List 1 - Union of Homeowners	438	0.05	
Unaccounted	8,453	1.04	
Total:	815,129		12

Deputies Elected
Bukin	SR
Goncharov	SR
Khodotov	SR
Maslov	SR
Matveevskaya	SR
Vladykin	SR
Volnov	SR
Volodin	SR
Andreev	Bolshevik
Fokin	Bolshevik
Ivanov	Bolshevik
Kuznetsov	Bolshevik

==== Kursk ====
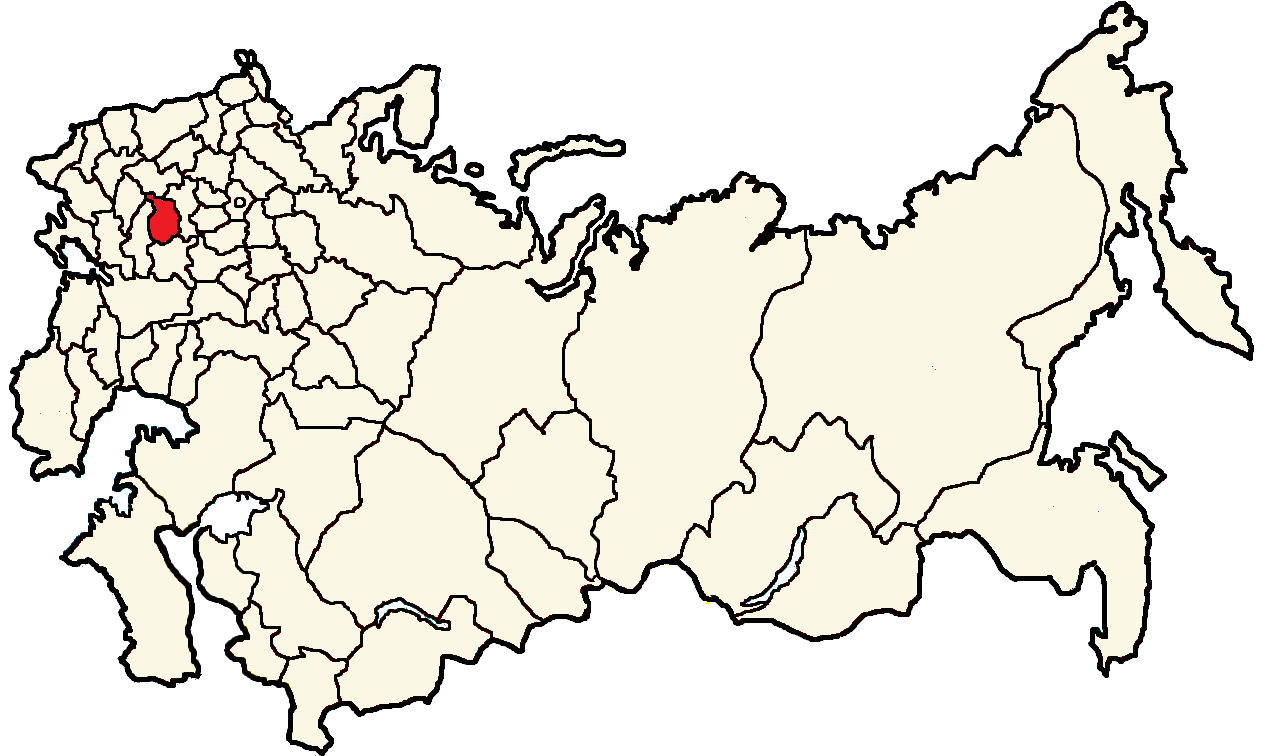

The electoral district covered the Kursk Governorate. Kursk was an agrarian, Black Earth province with no industries. The Bolshevik vote was attributed to soldiers returning home from the front.

Kursk
Party	Vote	%	Seats
List 1 - Socialist-Revolutionaries	868,743	82.08	12
List 4 - Bolsheviks	119,127	11.26	1
List 2 - Kadets	47,199	4.46	
List 5 - Union of Landowners	8,656	0.82	
List 3 - Popular Socialists	8,594	0.81	
List 6 - Mensheviks	6,037	0.57	
Total:	1,058,356		13

Deputies Elected
Baryshnikov	SR
Belosov	SR
Doroshev	SR
Kholodov	SR
Kutepov	SR
Merkulov	SR
Neruchev	SR
Pakhomov	SR
Piyanich	SR
Romanenko	SR
Rusanov	SR
Vlasov	SR
Ozemblovsky	Bolshevik

==== Voronezh ====
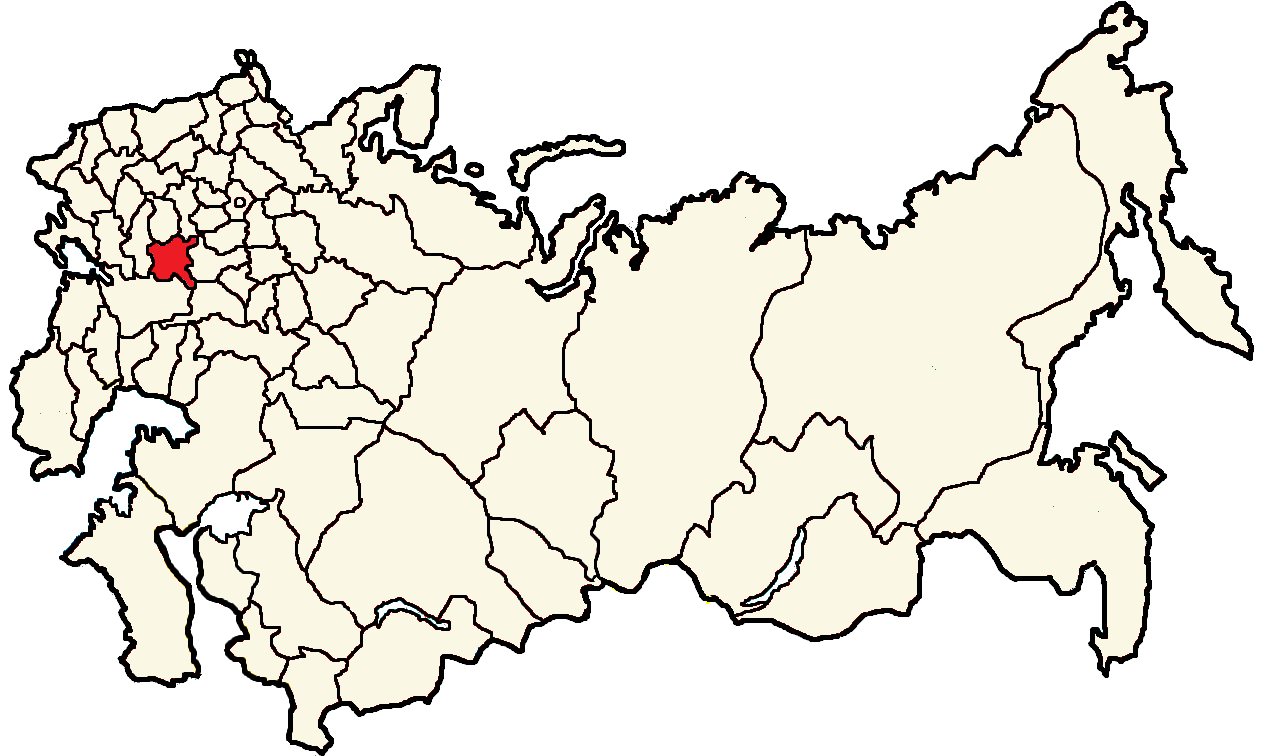

The electoral district covered the Voronezh Governorate.

Voronezh
Party	Vote	%
List 3 - Socialist-Revolutionaries	875,300	79.72
List 2 - Bolsheviks	151,517	13.80
List 1 - Kadets	36,488	3.32
List 5 - Left SRs-Ukrainian SRs- Polish Socialist Party alliance	11,871	1.08
List 4 - Mensheviks	8,658	0.79
List 8 - Union of Landowners	7,231	0.66
List 6 - Popular Socialists	6,116	0.56
List 7 - Mazury Society of Novokhopersky Uezd	796	0.07
Total:	1,097,977	

Deputies Elected
Kardashov	Bolshevik
Nevsky	Bolshevik
Antipin	SR
Bliznyuk	SR
Burevoy-Soplyakov	SR
Gladkikh	SR
Khrenovsky	SR
Kogan-Bernstein	SR
Mamkin	SR
Nikitin	SR
Oganovsky	SR
Perveeva	SR
Postnikov	SR
Smirnov	SR
Zinin	SR

==== Tambov ====
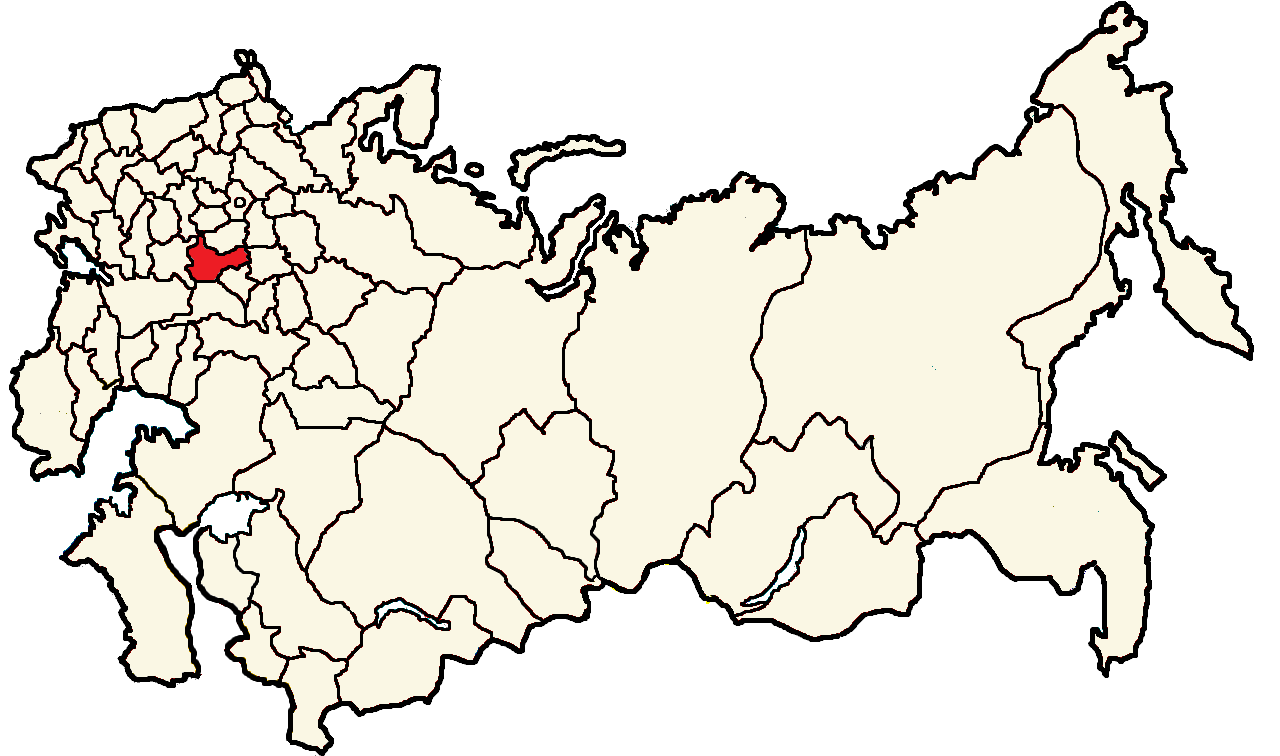

The electoral district covered the Tambov Governorate. 73% electoral participation was reported, as the SRs had a good mobilization capacity among the peasantry. In the Spassko-Kashminskaia canton, Morshansk uezd the SR local government banned the Bolshevik election campaign, alleging that the Bolsheviks were German spies.

Tambov
Party	Vote	%
List 1 - Socialist-Revolutionaries and Governorate Soviet of Peasants Deputies	835,556	71.22
List 7 - Bolsheviks	240,652	20.51
List 5 - Kadets	47,548	4.05
List 3 - Mensheviks	22,425	1.91
List 2 - Union of Landowners	12,493	1.06
List 4 - Popular Socialists and Congress of Cooperative Organizations	7,408	0.63
List 8 - Party of the Muslim Socialist-Democratic Bloc	6,222	0.53
List 6 - Uezd Peasants List	887	0.08
Total:	1,173,191	

Deputies Elected
Batmanov	SR
Bobynin	SR
Chernov	SR
Chernyshov	SR
Ilyin	SR
Kiselev	SR
Kondratenkov	SR
Merkulov	SR
Nabatov	SR
Nemtinov	SR
Odintsov	SR
Ryabov	SR
Sletova-Chernova	SR
Volsky	SR
Moiseev	Bolshevik
Olminsky	Bolshevik
Schlichter	Bolshevik

==== Penza ====
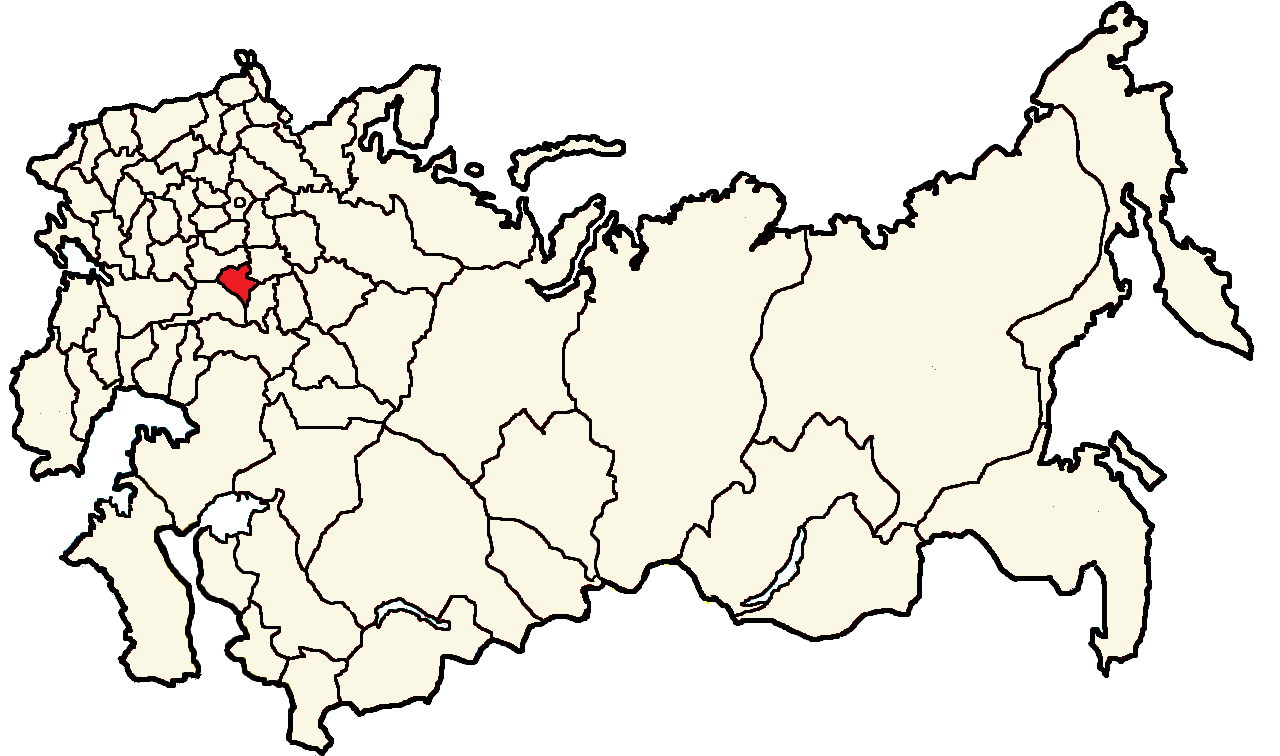

The electoral district covered the Penza Governorate. In Penza town there were 49,741 eligible voters, out of whom 17,583 voted (35%).

Penza
Party	Vote	%
List 4 - Socialist-Revolutionaries	517,226	81.29
List 5 - Bolsheviks- Menshevik-Internationalists	54,731	8.60
List 3 - National Bloc (Ukrainians, Muslims, Poles and Lithuanians)	29,821	4.69
List 1 - Kadets	25,407	3.99
List 2 - Mensheviks-Bund	4,726	0.74
List 6 - Popular Socialists	4,336	0.68
Total:	636,247	

Deputies Elected
Avksentiev	SR
Boldov	SR
Fedorovich	SR
Gots	SR
Konogov	SR
Kostin	SR
Leutnov	SR
Prokhorov	SR
Tsyngovatov	SR

=== Volga ===
==== Nizhny Novgorod ====
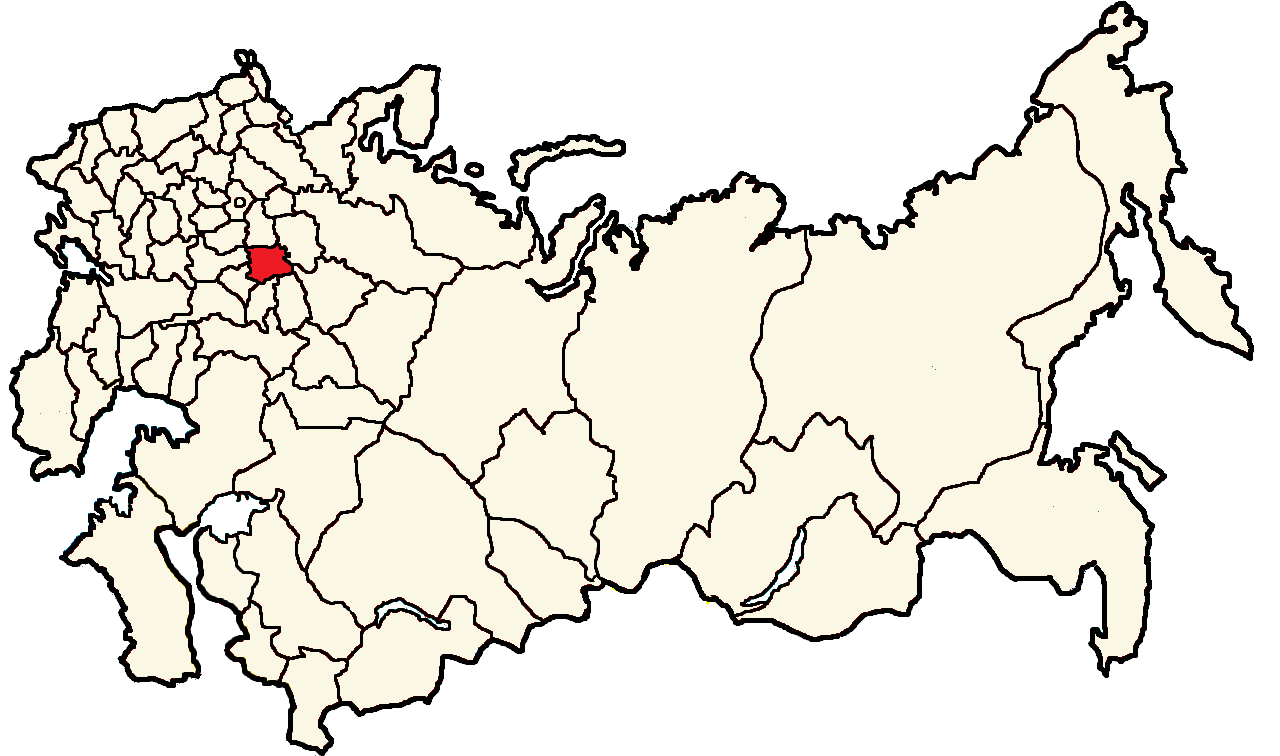

The electoral district covered the Nizhny Novgorod Governorate. Only in the Nizhny Novgorod constituency could the combined forces of clergy and far right make an electoral impact. The Christian Union for Faith and Fatherland had a relative success.

Nizhny Novgorod
Party	Vote	%	Seats
List 3 - Socialist-Revolutionaries and the Soviet of Peasants Deputies	314,004	54.15	6
List 7 - Bolsheviks	133,950	23.10	2
List 11 - Christian Union for Faith and Fatherland	48,428	8.35	1
List 12 - Kadets	34,726	5.99	
List 8 - All Muslim Socialist Bloc	19,935	3.44	
List 5 - Union of Old Believer Accord	16,230	2.80	
List 2 - Mensheviks	7,634	1.32	
List 10 - Popular Socialists	2,666	0.46	
List 6 - Ukrainian Group	126	0.02	
Unaccounted	2,198	0.38	
Total:	579,897		9

Deputies Elected
Sergius	Christian Unity
Fokeev	SR
Kutuzov	SR
Lukyanov	SR
Rakov	SR
Sumgin	SR
Tyurikov	SR
Danilov	Bolshevik
Romanov	Bolshevik

==== Simbirsk ====
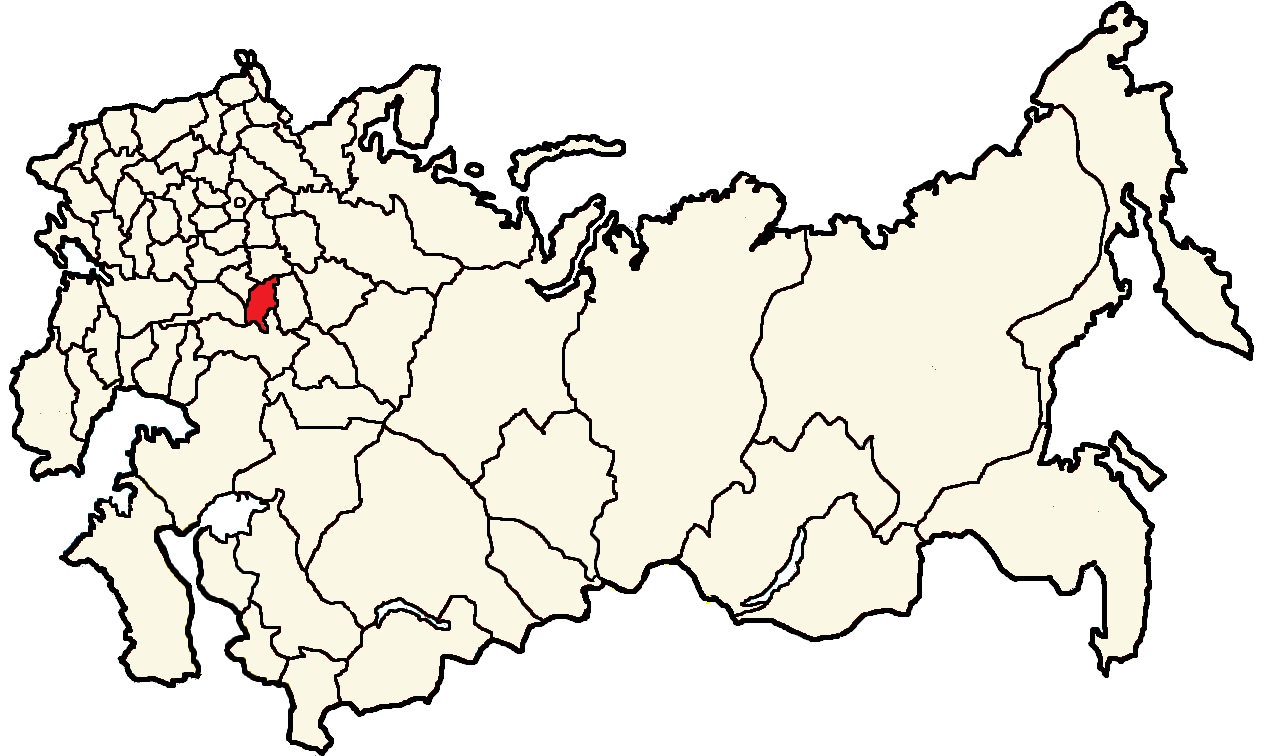

The electoral district covered the Simbirsk Governorate. Electoral participation was reported at around 58%.

Simbirsk
Party	Vote	%
List 2 - Socialist-Revolutionaries and Congress of Peasants	363,847	57.68
List 10 - Bolsheviks	93,000	14.74
List 8 - Muslim Shuro Islamia	57,000	9.04
List 4 -SR Defencists	29,446	4.67
List 5 - Kadets	16,718	2.65
List 6 - Mensheviks	3,681	0.58
List 12 - All Chuvash National Congress and Chuvash Organizations	55	0.01
List 9 - Popular Socialists	?	
List 3 - Cooperative	?	
List 13 - Union of Farmers and Landowners	?	
List 11 - Orthodox Parishes	?	
List 7 - Union of Traders, Industrialists, Artisans and Homeowners	?	
List 1 - Workers Committee of Protopov Factory	?	
Unaccounted	67,043	10.63
Total:	630,790	

Deputies Elected
Sverdlov	Bolshevik
Almazov	SR
Gavronsky	SR
Moshkin	SR
Petrov	SR
Pochekuev	SR
Titov	SR
Vorobiev	SR
Tsalikov	Muslim Shuro

==== Kazan ====
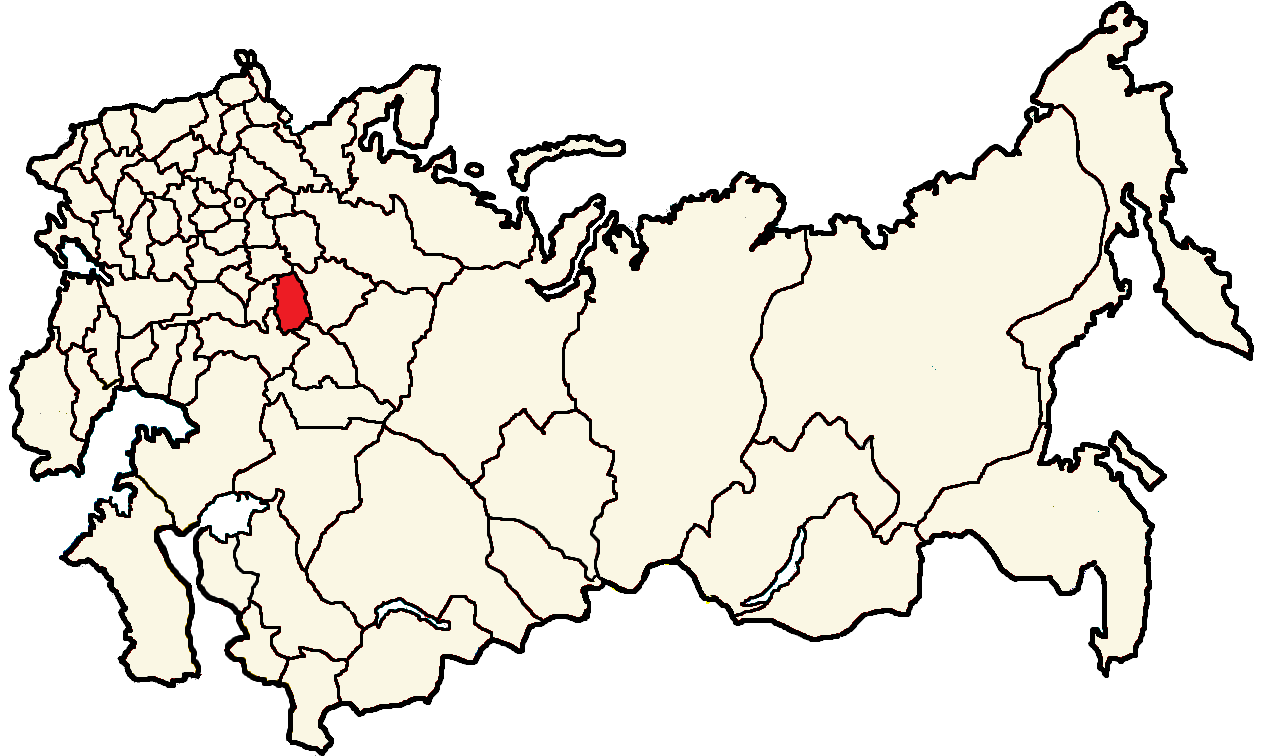

The electoral district covered the Kazan Governorate. 66% turnout was reported. The Chuvash largely voted for the SRs, and the local SR party branch was dominated by leftist elements. The Tatars voters were split between leftist and rightist lists.

Kazan
Party	Vote	%
List 11 - The Kazan Governorate Organization of the Socialist-Revolutionaries and the Soviet of Peasants Deputies	264,158	30.77
List 1 - The All Chuvash National Congress, the Chuvash Military Committees and the Chuvash Organization of the Socialist Revolutionary Party	226,496	26.38
List 10 - Muslim Socialist Committee	153,151	17.84
List 4 - Kazan Governorate Muslim Assembly	99,080	11.54
List 7 - Bolsheviks	51,936	6.05
List 2 - Kadets	31,728	3.70
List 6 - Orthodox Clergy and Laymen of the Kazan Governorate	12,322	1.44
List 9 - Right-wing Socialist-Revolutionaries	9,820	1.14
List 5 - Mensheviks	4,906	0.57
List 3 - Cooperatives and Independent Socialists	2,993	0.35
List 8 - Agricultural-Artisan-Commercial-Industrial group	2,001	0.23
Total:	858,591	

Deputies Elected
Alyunov	Chuvash
Nikolaev	Chuvash
Vasiliev	Chuvash
Alkin	Muslim Socialist
Waxitov	Muslim Socialist
Kolegaev	SR
Martyushin	SR
Mayorov	SR
Mokhov	SR
Sukhanov	SR
Khalfin	Muslim Assembly
Salekhov	Muslim Assembly

==== Samara ====
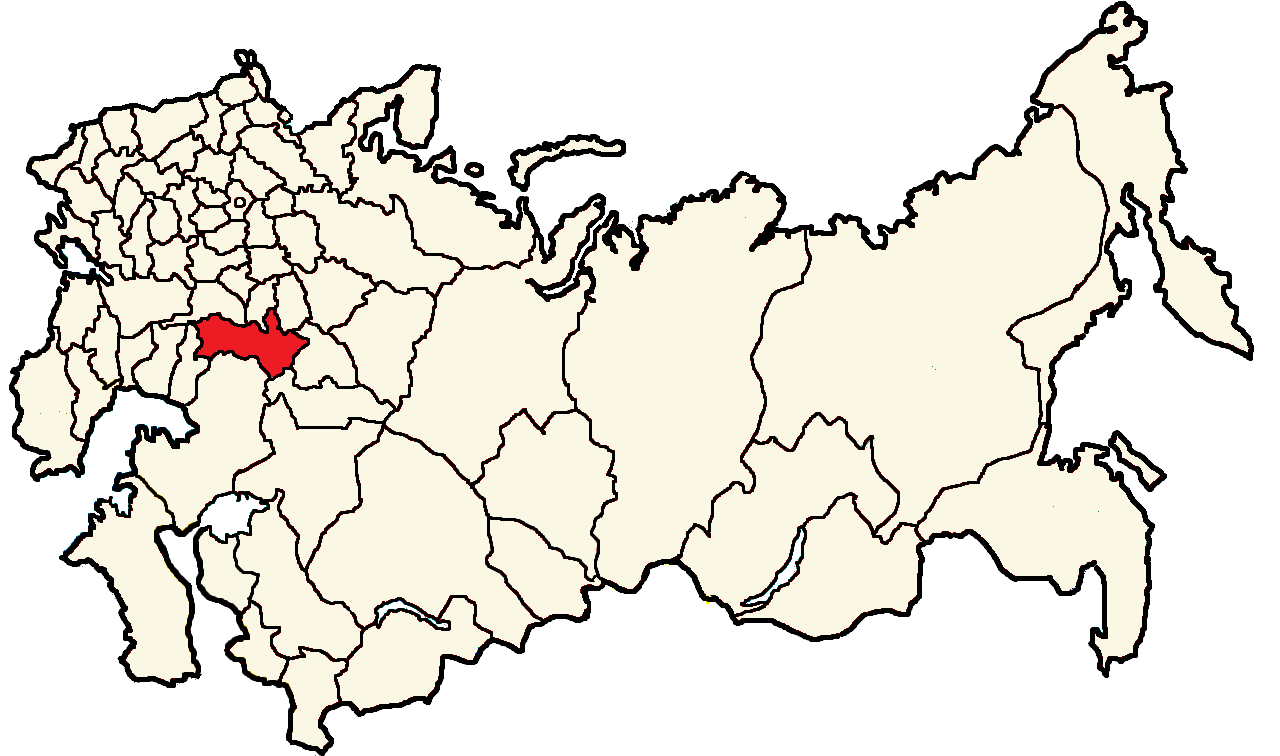

The electoral district covered the Samara Governorate. Electoral turnout was at 54.86%. Out of 95 different lists submitted, 79 were turned down (out of which approximately 42 lists were denied due to late submission).

Samara
Party	Vote	%	Seats
List 3 - Soviet of Peasants Deputies and Socialist-Revolutionaries	702,924	58.47	12
List 2 - Bolsheviks	179,533	14.93	3
List 13 - Muslim Shuro-Islamia	126,558	10.53	2
List 16 - Union of Russian Citizens of German Nationality in the Central Volga Region	47,705	3.97	
List 6 - Kadets	44,466	3.70	
List 1 - Union of Socialists of the Volga German Region	42,148	3.51	
List 15 - Orthodox Followers	13,133	1.09	
List 4 - Bashkir Federalists	12,397	1.03	
List 8 - Chuvash National Congress of Socialist-Revolutionaries	9,036	0.75	
List 7 - Old Believer Joint Committee	6,508	0.54	
List 10 - Ukrainians	4,378	0.36	
List 5 - Popular Socialists	4,364	0.36	
List 6 - Mensheviks	4,166	0.35	
List 12 - Non-Party Peasants-Farmers	3,030	0.25	
List 11 - Unity	937	0.08	
List 14 - Menshevik-Internationalists	936	0.08	
Total:	1,202,219		17

Deputies Elected
Mukhamediyarov	Muslim Shuro
Tuktarov	Muslim Shuro
Ermoshchenko	Bolshevik
Kuybyshev	Bolshevik
Maslennikov	Bolshevik
Arkangelsky	SR
Bashkirov	SR
Belozerov	SR
Brushvit	SR
Chupakhin	SR
Dedusenko	SR
Elyashevich	SR
Fortunatov	SR
Klimushkin	SR
Lazarev	SR
Maslov	SR
Bogoslovov	SR

==== Saratov ====
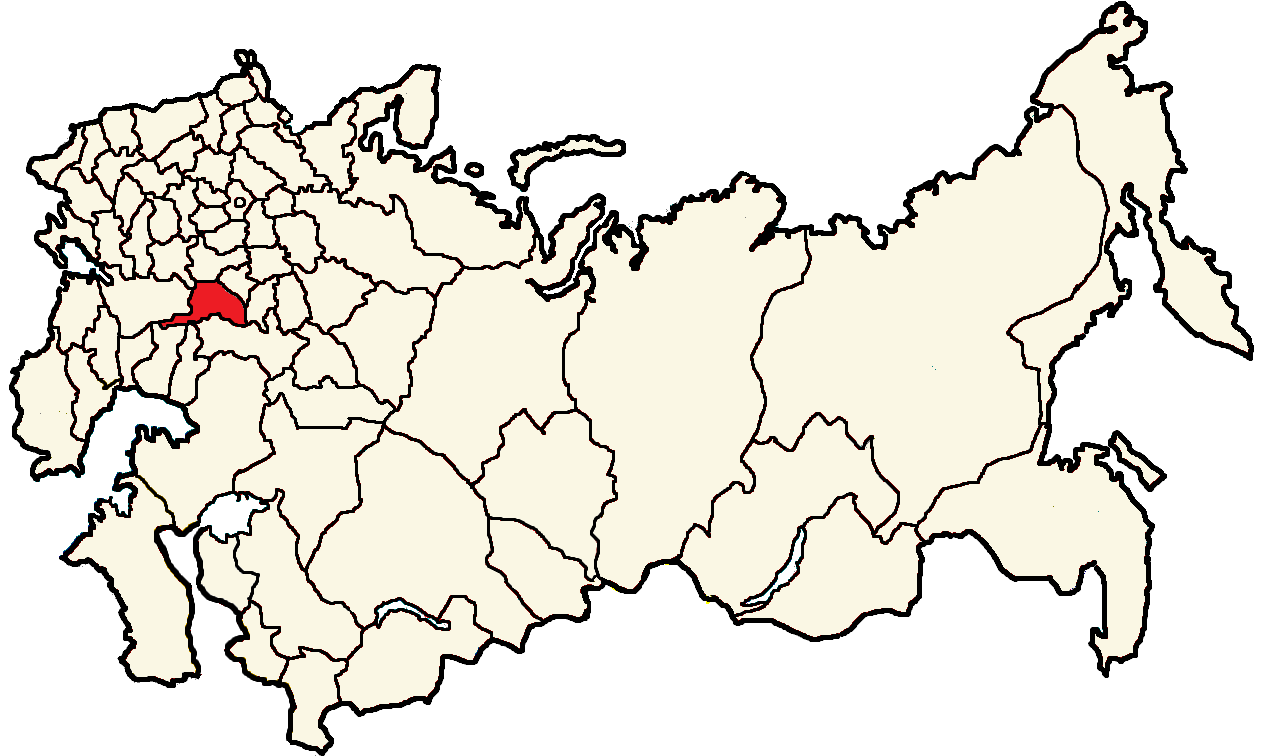

The electoral district covered the Saratov Governorate. Saratov had been one of the early strongholds of the SRs. Kerensky was one of the SR candidates, but many voters scratched his name from the list (and thus made their votes invalid). It was politically turbulent, also during the election. In Saratov Bolshevik campaigners were frequently attacked by rich farmers. Whilst the SR won in the largely agrarian district, the Bolsheviks had a strong showing, with strong support from soldiers and from the industrial city of Tsaritsyn.

Saratov
Party	Vote	%	Seats
List 12 - Socialist-Revolutionaries and the Soviet of Peasants Deputies	612,094	56.28	11
List 10 - Bolsheviks	261,308	24.03	4
List 3 - Union of Ukrainian Peasants, Ukrainian Refugees and the Organization of Tatar Socialist Revolutionaries	53,445	4.91	
List 7 - Volga Germans	50,025	4.60	
List 1 - Kadets	27,226	2.50	
List 5 - Orthodox People's Party	17,414	1.60	
List 2 - Mensheviks	15,152	1.39	
List 4 - Russian People's Party of Christians-Old Believers	13,956	1.28	
List 6 - Union of Landowners	13,804	1.27	
List 8 - Popular Socialists	10,243	0.94	
List 9 - Society for Faith and Order	6,600	0.61	
List 11 - Peasants of Petrovsk uezd and Mordva Population	6,379	0.59	
Total:	1,087,646		15

Deputies Elected
Antonov	Bolshevik
Milutin	Bolshevik
Minin	Bolshevik
Vasiliev	Bolshevik
Bykhovsky	SR
Chernavin	SR
Chernenkov	SR
Kerensky	SR
Kotov	SR
Minin	SR
Panchurin	SR
Rakitnikov	SR
Ulyanov	SR
Ustinov	SR
Zatonsky	SR

==== Astrakhan ====
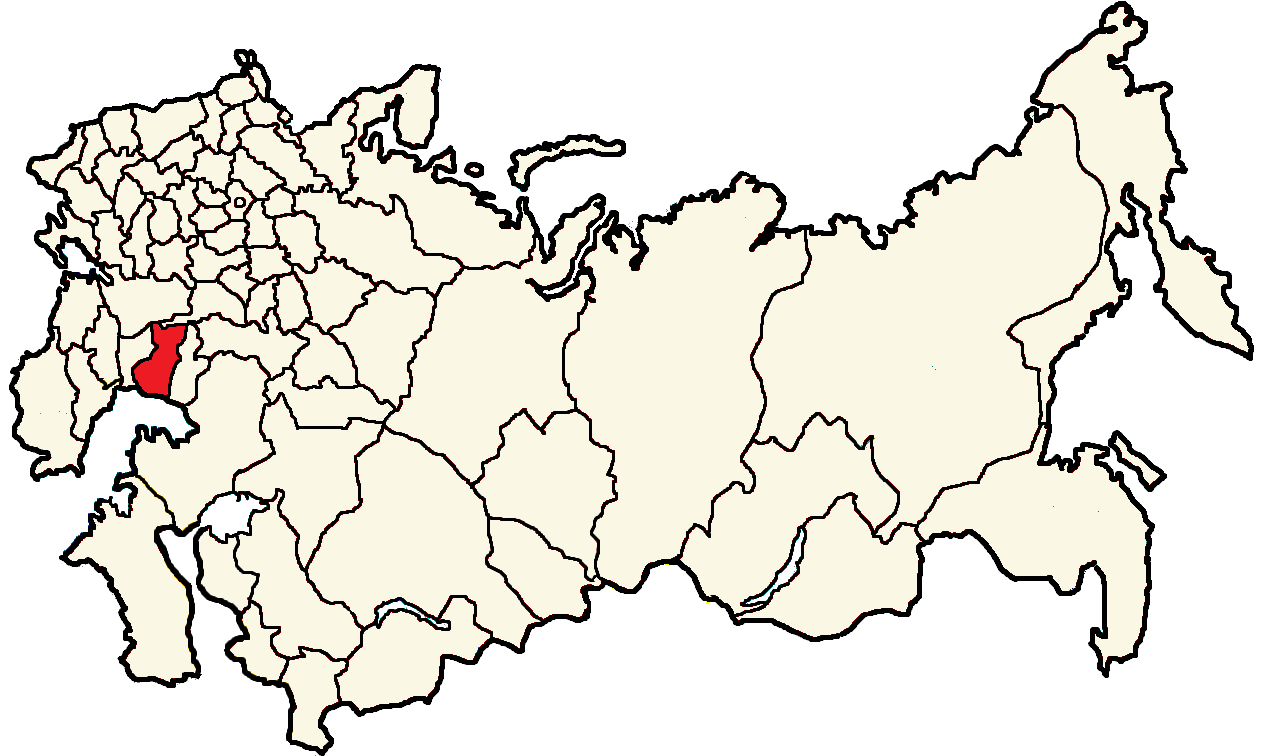

The electoral district covered parts of the Astrakhan Governorate, excluding the areas of the Bukey Horde and the Kalmyk Steppe. Radkey's account is incomplete, with some votes missing.

Astrakhan
Party	Vote	%
List 6 - Socialist-Revolutionaries	100,482	51.77
List 4 - Bolsheviks	36,023	18.56
List 2 - Muslim Group	25,023	12.89
List 3 - Cossack Group	16,400	8.45
List 1 - Kadets	13,017	6.71
List 5 - Mensheviks	2,256	1.16
List 7 - Popular Socialist Group of Tsarevsky Uezd	906	0.47
Total:	194,107	

Deputies Elected
Usmanov	Muslim
Tereshchenko	SR
Trusov	Bolshevik
Figner	SR
Nezhintsev	SR

=== Kama-Ural ===
==== Vyatka ====
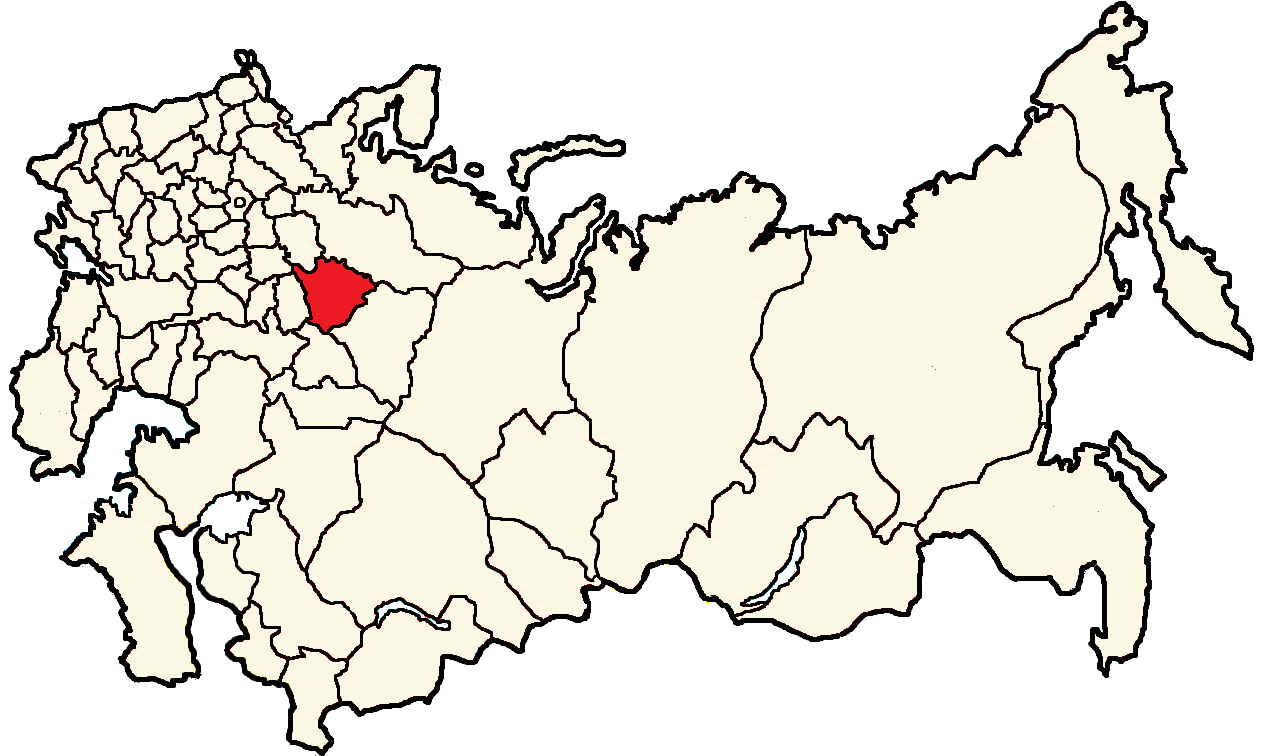

The electoral district covered the Vyatka Governorate. Radkey's account only includes full result for 3 lists (Bolsheviks, Mensheviks, Orthodox), albeit the number of votes for the Orthodox list has been rounded off. The real vote of the other nine lists, according to Radkey, would have been more than double that what is accounted for.

Vyatka
Party	Vote	%
List 3 – Vyatka Governorate Congress of Peasants Deputies and the Party of Socialist-Revolutionaries	300,503	46.91
List 11 – Bolsheviks	222,272	34.70
List 4 – Muslim Union of Vyatka Governorate	37,781	5.90
List 5 – Popular Socialists and Cheremi National Union	25,311	3.95
List 9 – Kadets	22,404	3.50
List 6 – Mensheviks	18,964	2.96
List 10 – Orthodox Parish Democratic Union	9,000	1.40
List 2 – Vyatka Governorate Commercial and Industrial Union	3,424	0.53
List 12 – Glazovski Uezd Congress of Workers, Soldiers and Peasants Soviets (Left Socialist-Revolutionaries)	942	0.15
List 1 – Kotelnichesky Uezd Soviet of Peasant Deputies	?	
List 7 – Petropavlovsk Division of the Russian Peasant Union	?	
List 8 – Group of Citizens of Yaraisky and Pachinsky Volosts	?	
Total:	640,601	

Deputies Elected
Pastukhov	Bolshevik
Popov	Bolshevik
Shvetsov	Bolshevik
Sponde	Bolshevik
Biryukov	SR
Buzanov	SR
Efremov	SR
Evseev	SR
Golovizin	SR
Kropotov	SR
Kuznetsov	SR
Salamatov	SR
Shulakov	SR
Zbarsky	SR
Tchaikovsky	Popular Socialists-Cheremi National Union alliance
Vikhlyaev	SR

==== Perm ====
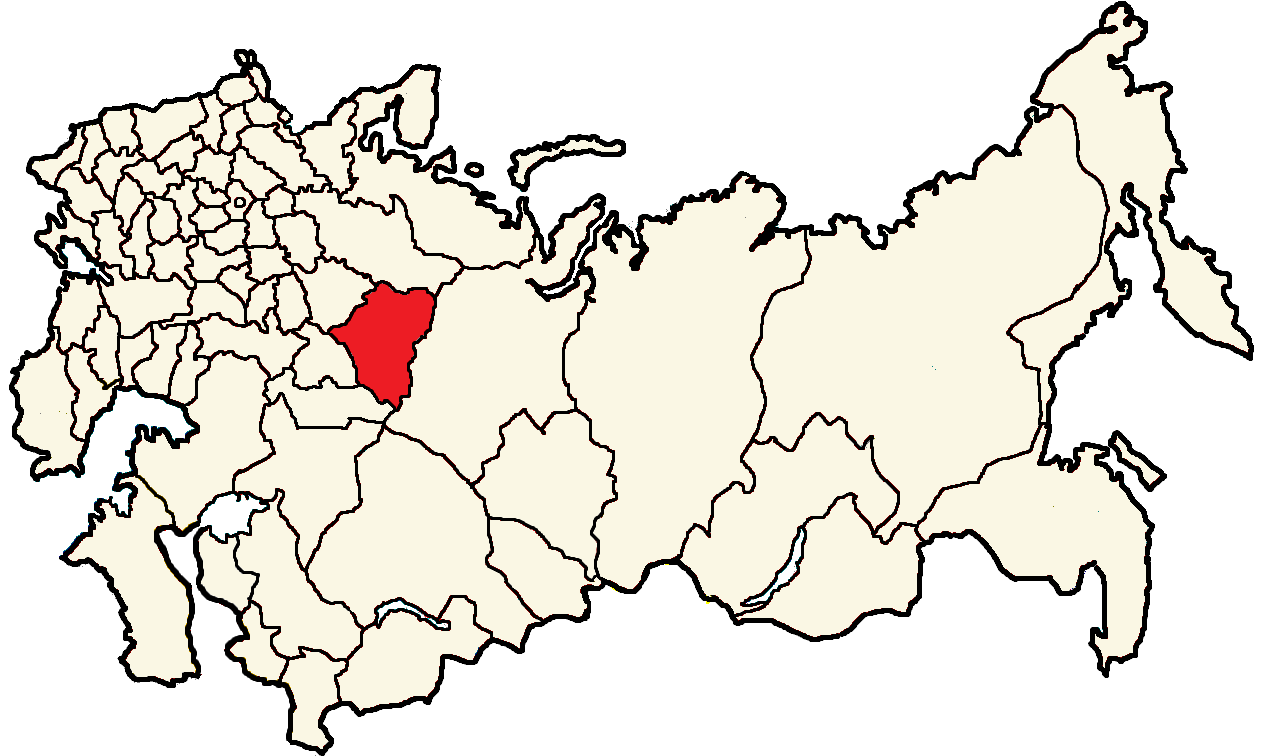

The electoral district covered the Perm Governorate.

Perm
Party	Vote	%
List 2 - Socialist-Revolutionaries	665,118	52.05
List 6 - Bolsheviks	268,292	20.99
List 5 - Kadets	111,241	8.71
List 10 - [Orthodox] Clerical People's Party	47,881	3.75
List 9 - Muslims-Bashkirs	47,578	3.72
List 4 - Old Believers	35,853	2.81
List 3 - Muslims	29,683	2.32
List 11 - Bloc of Rightist SRs and Unity	29,112	2.28
List 7 - Mensheviks	28,002	2.19
List 1 - Krasnoufimsky Non-Partisan Credit Union	13,748	1.08
List 8 - Radical Democrats	1,381	0.11
Total:	1,277,889	

Deputies Elected
Alekseev	SR
Bondarev	SR
Gerstein	SR
Kabakov	SR
Kuznetsov	SR
Sigov	SR
Tarabukin	SR
Varushkin	SR
Zateeyshchikov	SR
Zdobnov	SR
Zisman	SR
Krol	Kadet
Sumarokov	Kadet
Andronnikov	Bolshevik
Beloborodov	Bolshevik
Krestinsky	Bolshevik
Sosnovsky	Bolshevik
Tukhvatullin	Bashkir-Tatar group

==== Ufa ====
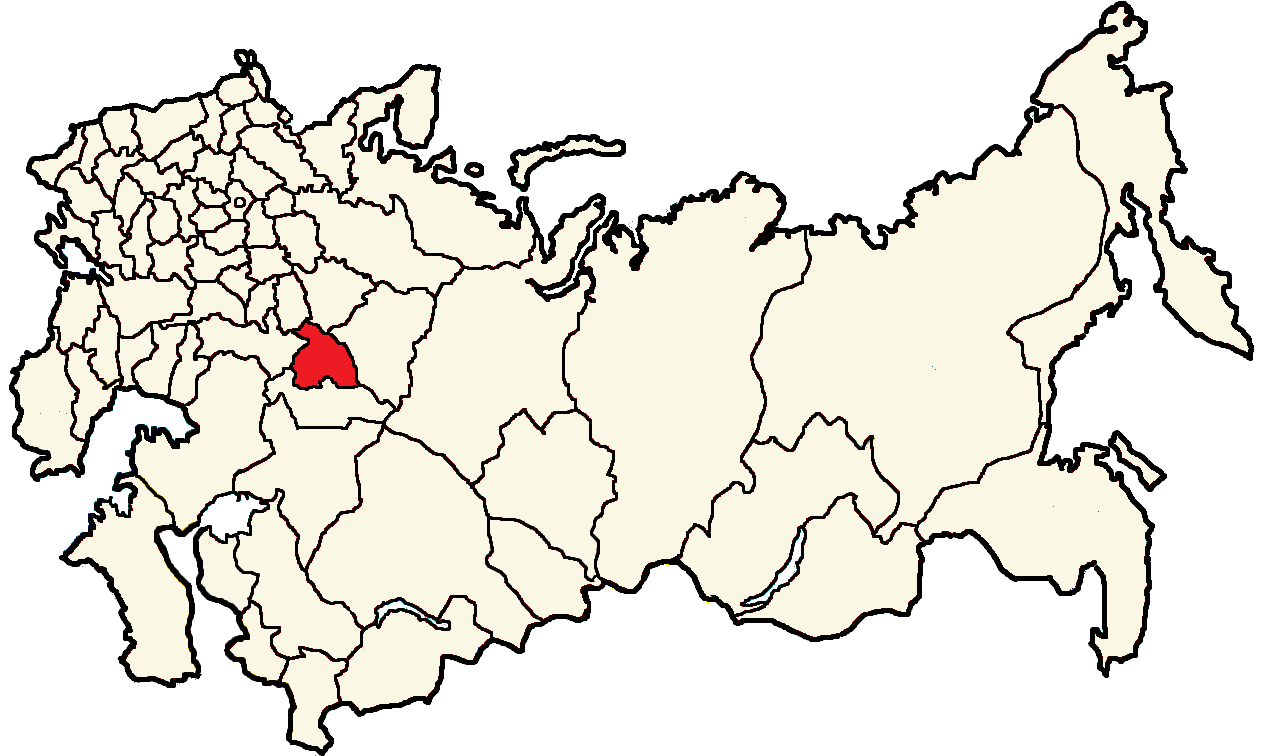

The electoral district covered the Ufa Governorate.

Ufa
Party	Vote	%	Seats
List 9 - Socialist-Revolutionaries	322,166	33.68	5
List 3 - Muslims (Social-Revolutionaries)	304,864	31.88	5
List 11 - Bashkir Federalists	135,977	14.22	2
List 1 - Muslim National Council	88,850	9.29	1
List 10 - Bolsheviks	48,151	5.03	
List 12 - Kadets	15,825	1.65	
List 6 - Orthodox Parishes	11,178	1.17	
List 8 - Popular Socialists	11,429	1.19	
List 2 - Landowners	7,358	0.77	
List 4 - Cooperative	4,941	0.52	
List 7 - Unity	3,078	0.32	
List 5 - Mensheviks	2,614	0.27	
Total:	956,431		13

Deputies Elected
Teregulov	Muslim National Council
Kuvatov	Bashkir Federalist
Validov	Bashkir Federalist
Akhmerov	Council of Peasants' Deputies
Ibragimov	Council of Peasants' Deputies
Ilyasov	Council of Peasants' Deputies
Mukhametdinov	Council of Peasants' Deputies
Syuncheley	Council of Peasants' Deputies
Brillantov	SR
Filatov	SR
Osintsev	SR
Steinberg	SR
Trutovsky	SR

==== Orenburg ====
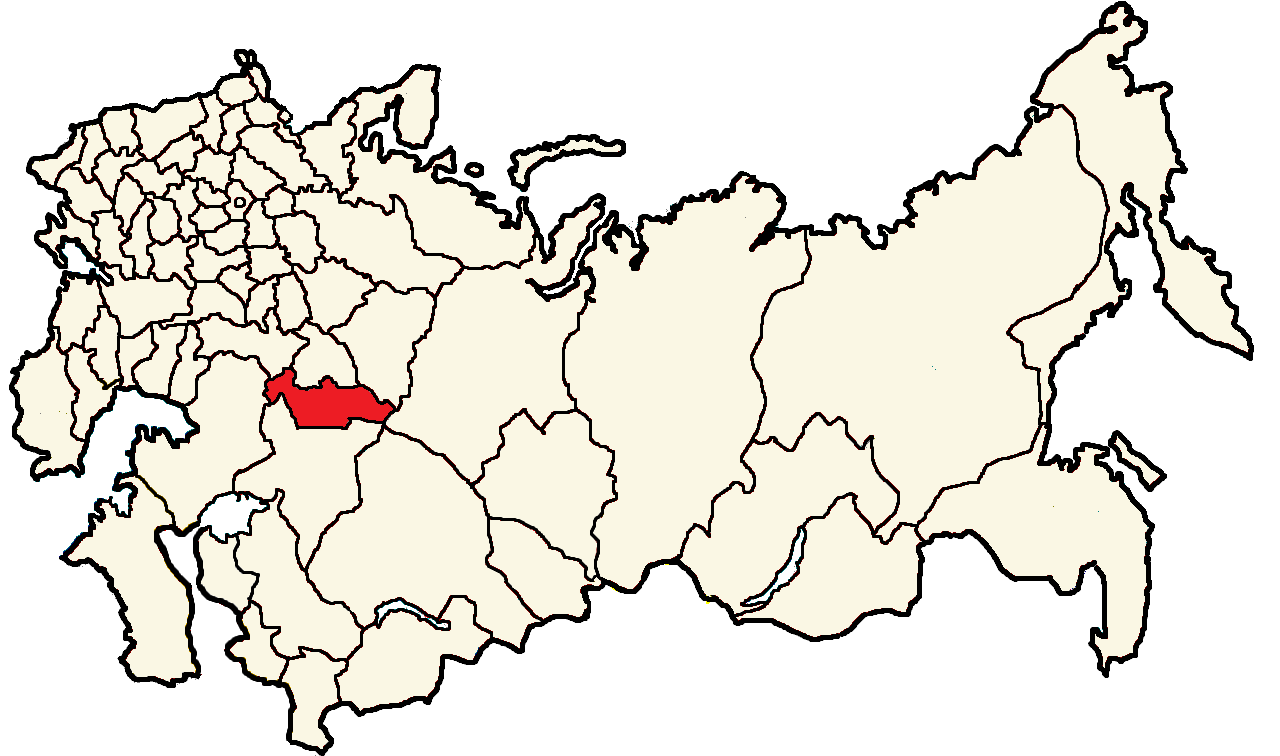

The electoral district covered the Orenburg Governorate. According to Radkey, his account of the Bashkir Federalist vote is underestimated, believing that the real figure would land at around 100,000.

Orenburg
Party	Vote	%
List 8 - Bolsheviks	163,425	24.14
List 2 - Orenburg Cossack Host	144,039	21.28
List 3 - Socialist-Revolutionaries	110,172	16.28
List 9 - Bashkir Federalists	51,787	7.65
List 1 - Kadets	24,757	3.66
List 5 - Muslim Association	16,652	2.46
List 4 - Mensheviks	7,544	1.11
List 6 - Cooperative	7,296	1.08
List 7 - Popular Socialists	5,681	0.84
Unaccounted	145,512	21.50
Total:	676,865	

Deputies Elected
Dutov	Cossack
Krivoschekov	Cossack
Matushkin	Cossack
Myakutin	Cossack
Bogdanov	Cossack
Polyakov	SR
Sorokin	SR
Chutskaya	Bolshevik
Korostelev	Bolshevik
Zwilling	Bolshevik
Bikbov	Bashkir Federalist
Fakhretdinov	Bashkir Federalist
Manatov	Bashkir Federalist

=== Ukraine ===
==== Kiev ====
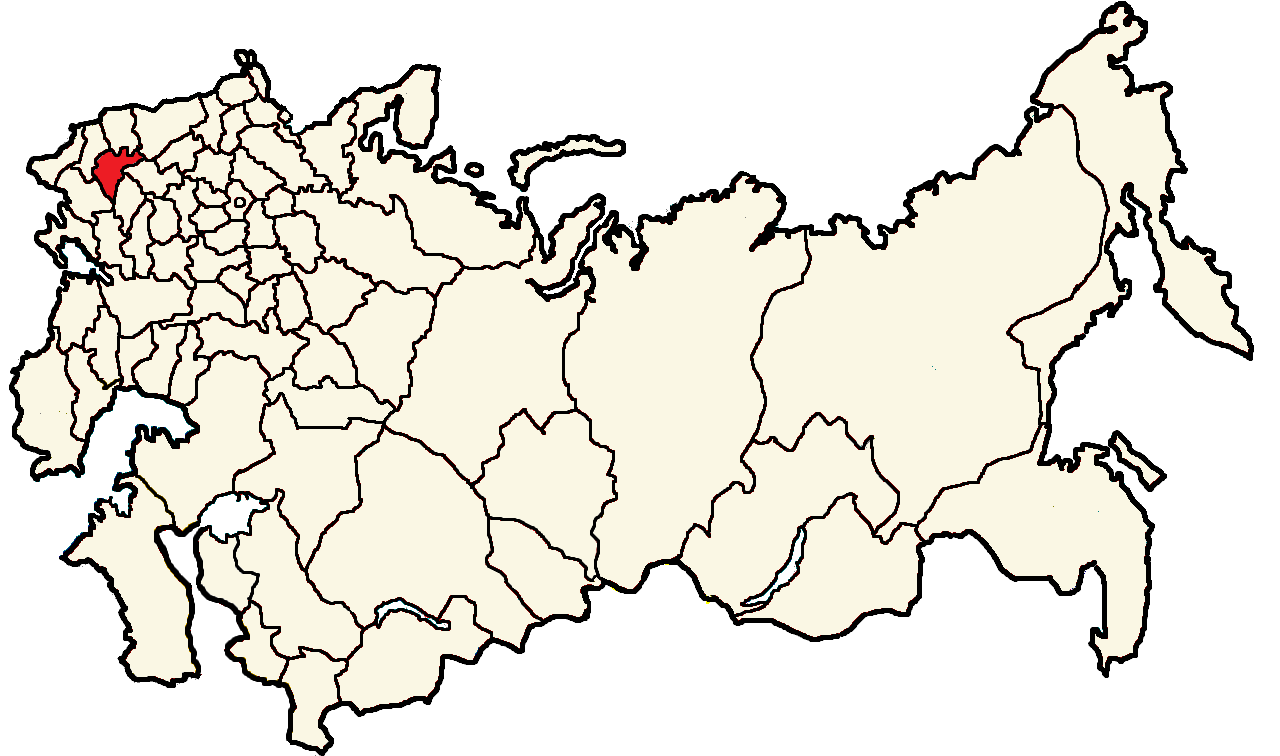

The electoral district covered the Kiev Governorate. Kiev was a historical Black Hundred stronghold, and monarchists got some 3% of the votes in the district.

Kiev
Party	Vote	%
List 1 - Ukrainian Socialist Bloc	1,161,033	77.26
List 2 - Jewish National Bloc	90,829	6.04
List 12 - Bolsheviks	60,693	4.04
List 8 - Russian Rightists	48,758	3.24
List 11 - Polish	42,943	2.86
List 6 - Kadets	21,667	1.44
List 9 - Bund	20,144	1.34
List 14 - Socialist-Revolutionaries	19,220	1.28
List 3 - Jewish Socialists	14,115	0.94
List 5 - Mensheviks	11,613	0.77
List 4 - Poalei Zion	4,086	0.27
List 13 - Ukrainian Socialists-Federalists and Popular Socialists	3,072	0.20
List 16 - Commercial-Industrial	2,508	0.17
List 17 - Unity	928	0.06
List 10 - Villagers' Group	655	0.04
List 7 - Military Revolutionary Union	258	0.02
List 15 - Zaustsinsky	203	0.01
Total:	1,502,725	

Deputies Elected
Chechel	Ukrainian Bloc
Darchuk	Ukrainian Bloc
Donchenko	Ukrainian Bloc
Dragomiretsky	Ukrainian Bloc
Hrushevsky	Ukrainian Bloc
Ilchenko	Ukrainian Bloc
Khimerik	Ukrainian Bloc
Khomutovsky	Ukrainian Bloc
Kotik	Ukrainian Bloc
Mandryka	Ukrainian Bloc
Porsh	Ukrainian Bloc
Prisyazhnyuk	Ukrainian Bloc
Pyrkovka	Ukrainian Bloc
Rohmanyuk	Ukrainian Bloc
Sevryuk	Ukrainian Bloc
Shvets	Ukrainian Bloc
Stasyuk	Ukrainian Bloc
Tkachenko	Ukrainian Bloc
Vynnychenko	Ukrainian Bloc
Fyalek	Bolshevik
Syrkin	Jewish National Bloc

==== Volhynia ====
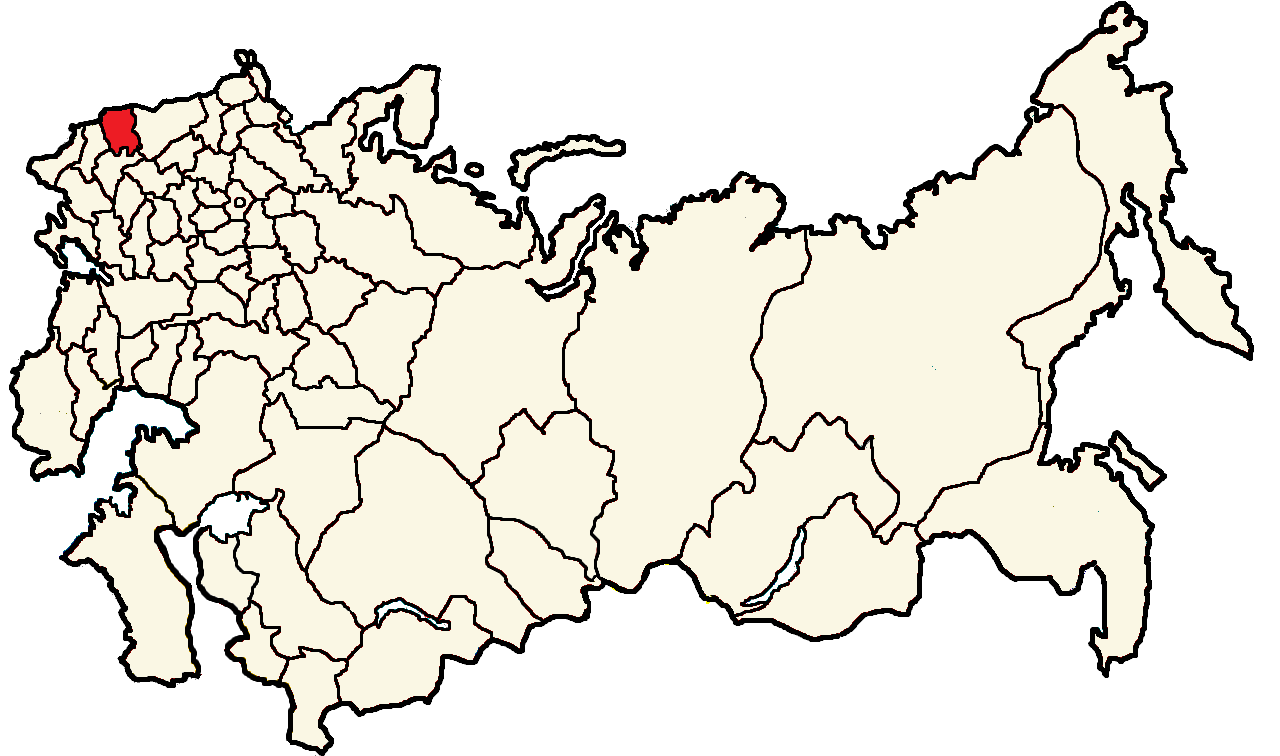

The electoral district covered the Volhynian Governorate. The western parts of the electoral district were under German or Austrian occupation. Radkey expresses concern that the votes account from Volynia (exclusively brought from the 1918 study by Sviatitski) may have been largely incomplete, possibly an effect of the proximity to the battle lines.

Volhynia
Party	Vote	%	Seats
List 11 - Ukrainian Socialist-Revolutionaries and Council of Peasant Deputies	569,044	70.76	9
List 4 - Polish	57,998	7.21	1
Jewish national lists; List 2 - Jewish National Electoral Committee; List 3 - Jewish National Party; List 8 - Jewish Community Personalities	55,967	6.96	
List 12 - Bolsheviks	35,612	4.43	
List 6 - Socialist-Revolutionaries	27,575	3.43	
List 5 - Kadets and Non-Party Farmers	22,337	2.78	
List 1 - Mensheviks-Bund	16,947	2.11	
List 13 - Rightists and coreligionists	1,438	0.18	
List 10 - United Jewish Socialist Labour Party (S.S. and E.S.)	?		
List 9 - Poalei Zion	?		
List 7 - Ukrainian Socialist-Federalists	?		
Unaccounted	17,290	2.15	
Total:	804,208		10

==== Podolia ====
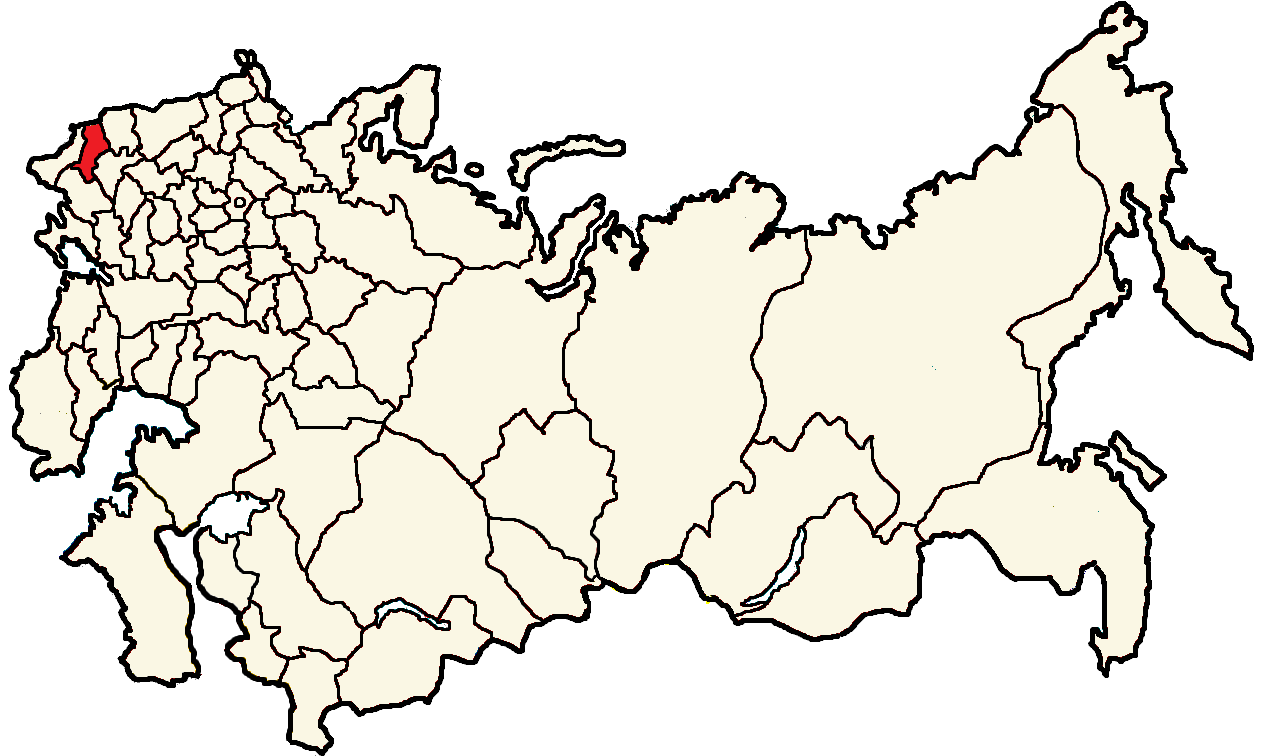

The electoral district covered the Podolian Governorate. Podolia was close to the frontline. Radkey cites that the Ukrainian Social Democratic Labour Party organ Robitchna Gazeta reported that elections were held in Podolia between Dec 3–7, and presented results from 9 out of 12 uezds, but Robitchna Gazeta's party tally greater than the vote cast in the 9 uezds, possibly pointing to results included from the remaining 3 uezds.

Podolia
Party	Vote	%
List 1 - Ukrainian SRs, Selyanska Spilka and Ukrainian Soc.-Dem. Labour Party	652,306	78.57
List 2 - Jewish National Electoral Committee	62,544	7.53
List 8 - Regional Polish List	46,500	5.60
List 15 - Bolsheviks	27,550	3.32
List 10 - Socialist-Revolutionaries,Soviet of Peasants and Soviet of Soldiers of the South-Western Front	10,170	1.22
List 5 - Bund	7,959	0.96
List 4 - Kadets	7,951	0.96
List 14 - Mensheviks	4,028	0.49
List 12 - Ukrainian Toilers List	3,810	0.46
List 3 - United Jewish Socialist Labour Party (S.S. and E.S.)	3,415	0.41
List 7 - Poalei Zion	2,164	0.26
List 9 - Popular Socialists	852	0.10
List 16 - United Polish	412	0.05
List 6 - Jewish List	322	0.04
List 13 - Ushitsky Uezd List	284	0.03
List 11 - Zionists	-	
Total:	830,267	

Deputies Elected
Antonovych	Ukrainian Bloc
Blonski	Ukrainian Bloc
Dudich	Ukrainian Bloc
Dyachuk	Ukrainian Bloc
Gerasimenko	Ukrainian Bloc
Golovchuk	Ukrainian Bloc
Grigoriev	Ukrainian Bloc
Isaevich	Ukrainian Bloc
Litvitsky	Ukrainian Bloc
Liubynsky	Ukrainian Bloc
Machushenko	Ukrainian Bloc
Nikolaychuk	Ukrainian Bloc
Shevchenko	Ukrainian Bloc
Shimanovich	Ukrainian Bloc
Tkach	Ukrainian Bloc
Verkhola	Ukrainian Bloc
Widybida-Rudenko	Ukrainian Bloc
Bartoszewicz	Polish List

==== Chernigov ====
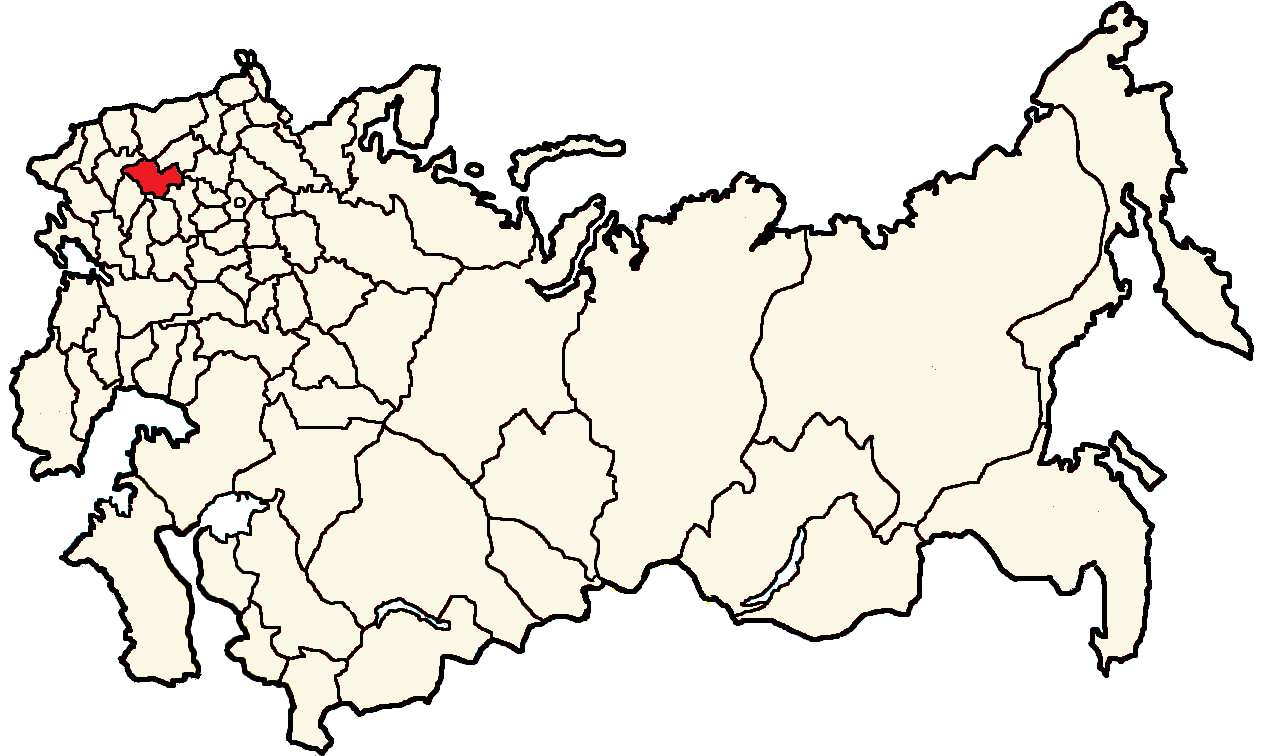

The electoral district covered the Chernigov Governorate. Chernigov was an agrarian province. The Bolshevik Party was absent in most uezds and weak in others. But returning soldiers, about a quarter of the electorate, boosted the Bolshevik vote.

Spirin is the source for the results tally from Chernigov. There is a difference of just 16 votes in the total tallies of Spirin and Radkey, but Spirin is more precise on the identities of the candidate lists in the fray.

Chernigov
Party	Vote	%	Seats
List 10 - Ukrainian Socialist-Revolutionaries	484,156	49.73	9
List 9 - Bolsheviks	271,174	27.85	4
List 1 - Socialist-Revolutionaries	105,565	10.84	1
List 7 - Kadets	28,864	2.96	
List 4 - Jewish National Committee	28,308	2.91	
List 15 - Non-Partisan Public Figures	12,050	1.24	
List 14 - Landowners	11,857	1.22	
List 2 - Mensheviks	10,813	1.11	
List 3 - Bloc of Ukrainian Socialist-Federalists and Popular Socialists	10,089	1.04	
List 5 - Old Believers	4,858	0.50	
List 11 - Poalei Zion	2,808	0.29	
List 8 - Toiling Peasants	1,020	0.10	
List 13 - Employees of Government Agencies	1,005	0.10	
List 6 - Peasants of Mglin Uezd	538	0.06	
List 12 - Commercial-Industrial	525	0.05	
Total:	973,630		14

Deputies Elected
Breshko-Breshkovskaya	SR
Kostenetsky	Ukrainian SR
Kovalevsky	Ukrainian SR
Kovbasa	Ukrainian SR
Kuzmenko	Ukrainian SR
Lashkevich	Ukrainian SR
Odinets	Ukrainian SR
Sayenko	Ukrainian SR
Shapoval	Ukrainian SR
Shrag	Ukrainian SR
Bosch	Bolshevik
Motorra	Bolshevik
Pyatakov	Bolshevik
Ryndich	Bolshevik

==== Poltava ====
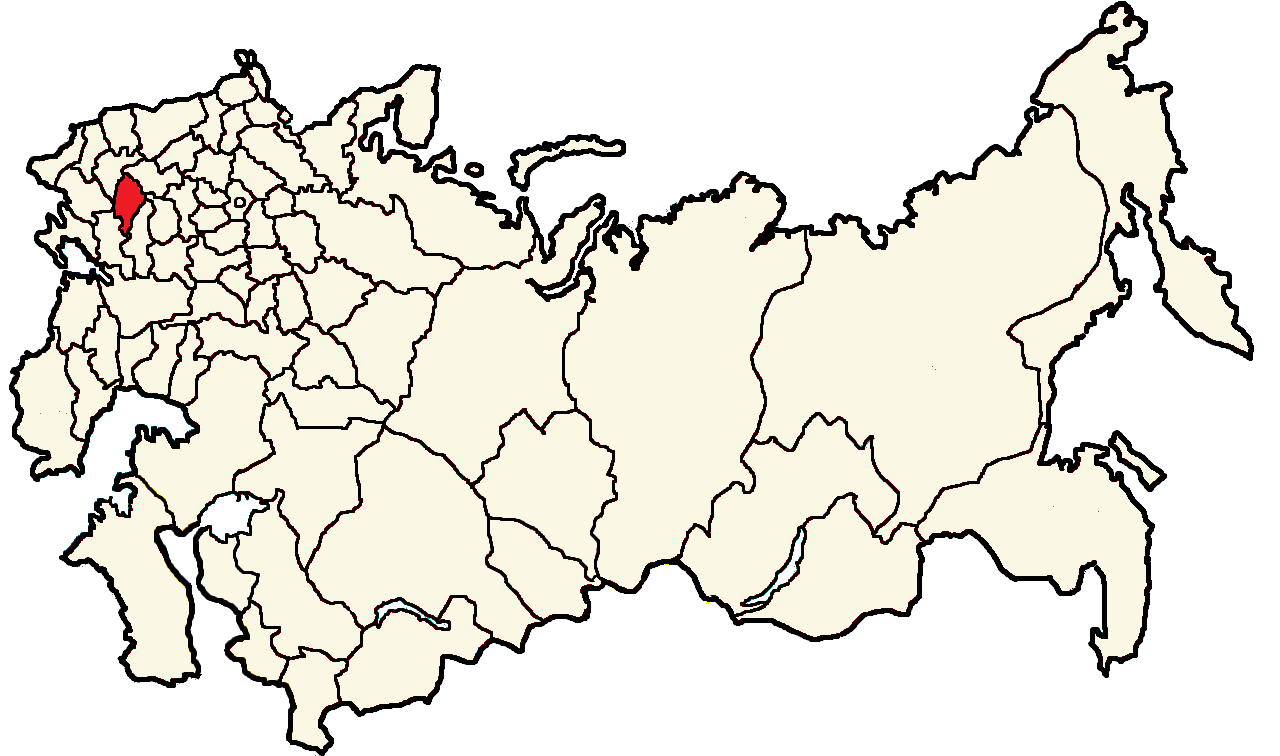

The electoral district covered the Poltava Governorate. Poltava was an agrarian province. Voter turnout was reported at 74%.

The Russian SRs (dominated by the left) ran a joint list with the Ukrainian SRs (also dominated by its leftist faction). The Selianska Spilka ('Village Union'), the agrarian wing of the Ukrainian SRs, confronted the Farmers (Landowners) Party, excluding Landowners from local election commissions. The campaign against the Landowners Party occasionally took a violent shape.

The lists of the Folkspartey and the Jewish National Electoral Committee formed an electoral bloc, likewise the Poalei Zion and the United Socialist Jewish Workers Party lists formed an electoral bloc. Three minor Ukrainian lists formed an electoral bloc: the Ukrainian Social Democrats and the Ukrainian Socialist-Federalists and the Ukrainian National Republican Group.

Poltava
Party	Vote	%
List 8 - Ukrainian Socialist-Revolutionaries and Selianska Spilka	727,247	63.28
List 17 - Socialist-Revolutionaries and Ukrainian Socialist-Revolutionaries	198,437	17.27
List 12 - Bolsheviks	64,460	5.61
List 2 - Farmer-Owners	61,115	5.32
List 15 - Ukrainian Social Democrats	22,613	1.97
List 3 - Kadets	18,105	1.58
List 6 - Jewish National Electoral Committee	13,722	1.19
List 9 - Jewish List	12,100	1.05
List 13 - Ukrainian Socialist-Federalists	9,092	0.79
List 1 - Folkspartey	6,448	0.56
List 10 - Mensheviks, Bund, Polish Unity	5,993	0.52
List 14 - Popular Socialists and Cooperativists	4,391	0.38
List 5 - List without title	1,657	0.14
List 7 - United Jewish Socialist Labour Party (S.S. and E.S.)	1,482	0.13
List 11 - Ukrainian National Republican Group	1,070	0.09
List 4 - Poalei Zion	879	0.08
List 16 - Soviet of Peasants Deputies of Smenoi Rovno Village	445	0.04
Total:	1,149,256	

Deputies Elected
Kovalyov	Ukrainian SR-SR alliance
Poloz	Ukrainian SR-SR alliance
Terletsky	Ukrainian SR-SR alliance
Galagan	Ukrainian SR
Ivchenko	Ukrainian SR
Kovalenko	Ukrainian SR
Kovalevsky	Ukrainian SR
Kulichenko	Ukrainian SR
Petrenko	Ukrainian SR
Polotsky	Ukrainian SR
Semenyaga	Ukrainian SR
Sten'ka	Ukrainian SR
Stepanenko	Ukrainian SR
Yanko	Ukrainian SR

==== Kharkov ====
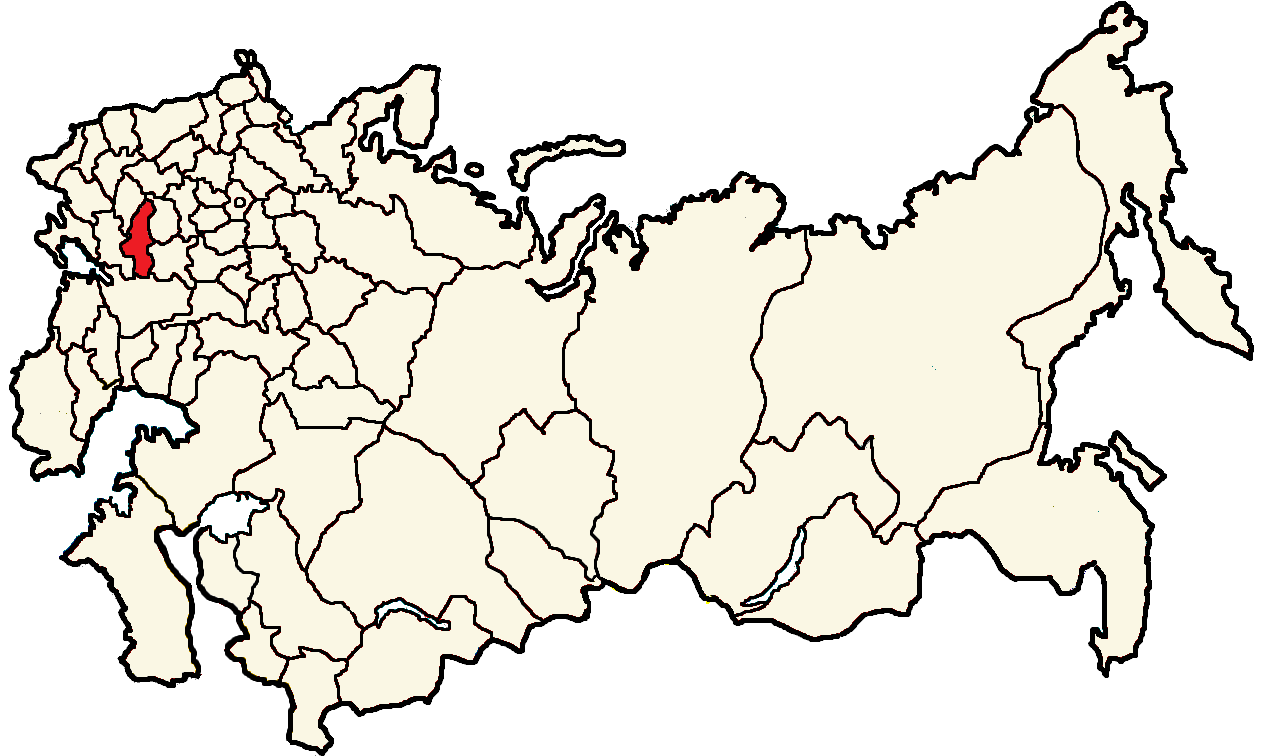

The electoral district covered the Kharkov Governorate. The SR list in Kharkov was dominated by the left-wing, contesting jointly with the Ukrainian SRs. The rightwing pro-war SR faction had its own list, headed by E.K. Breshko-Breshkovskaia. Whilst trailing far behind the SRs across the country-side, the Bolsheviks won the election in Kharkov city.

Spirin is the source for the result from Kharkov. There is a difference of just 873 votes between Radkey and Spirin in the total tally for Kharkov electoral district, but Spirin is more precise on the identities of the lists in the fray.

Kharkov
Party	Vote	%
List 5 -Socialist-Revolutionaries and Ukrainian SRs	795,558	72.82
List 3 - Bolsheviks	114,743	10.50
List 6 - Kadets	58,302	5.34
List 15 - SR Defencists	42,331	3.87
List 2 - Landowners	13,847	1.27
List 4 - Menshevik-Internationalists	12,192	1.12
List 11 - Popular Socialists	11,852	1.08
List 1 - [Orthodox] Parishes	10,478	0.96
List 12 - Commercial-Industrial	6,543	0.60
List 10 - Jewish National Bloc	6,366	0.58
List 9 - Menshevik Defencists	6,024	0.55
List 16 - Germans	5,221	0.48
List 7 - E. Abramov	3,776	0.35
List 14 - Unity	2,293	0.21
List 13 - Serp	917	0.08
List 8 - Poalei Zion	875	0.08
List 19 - Cooperators and Unity	590	0.05
List 18 - Peasants of Zmiyevsky Uezd	311	0.03
List 17 - Peasants of Sumy Uezd	229	0.02
Total:	1,092,448	

Deputies Elected
Muranov	Bolshevik
Sergeyev	Bolshevik
Alekseev	SR
Dyakonov	SR
Kachinsky-Oreshin	SR
Karelin	SR
Kravchenko	SR
Mikhailichenko	SR
Ovcharenko	SR
Popov	SR
Severov-Odoyevsky	SR
Shkorbatov	SR
Streltsov	SR
Svyatitsky	SR

==== Yekaterinoslav ====
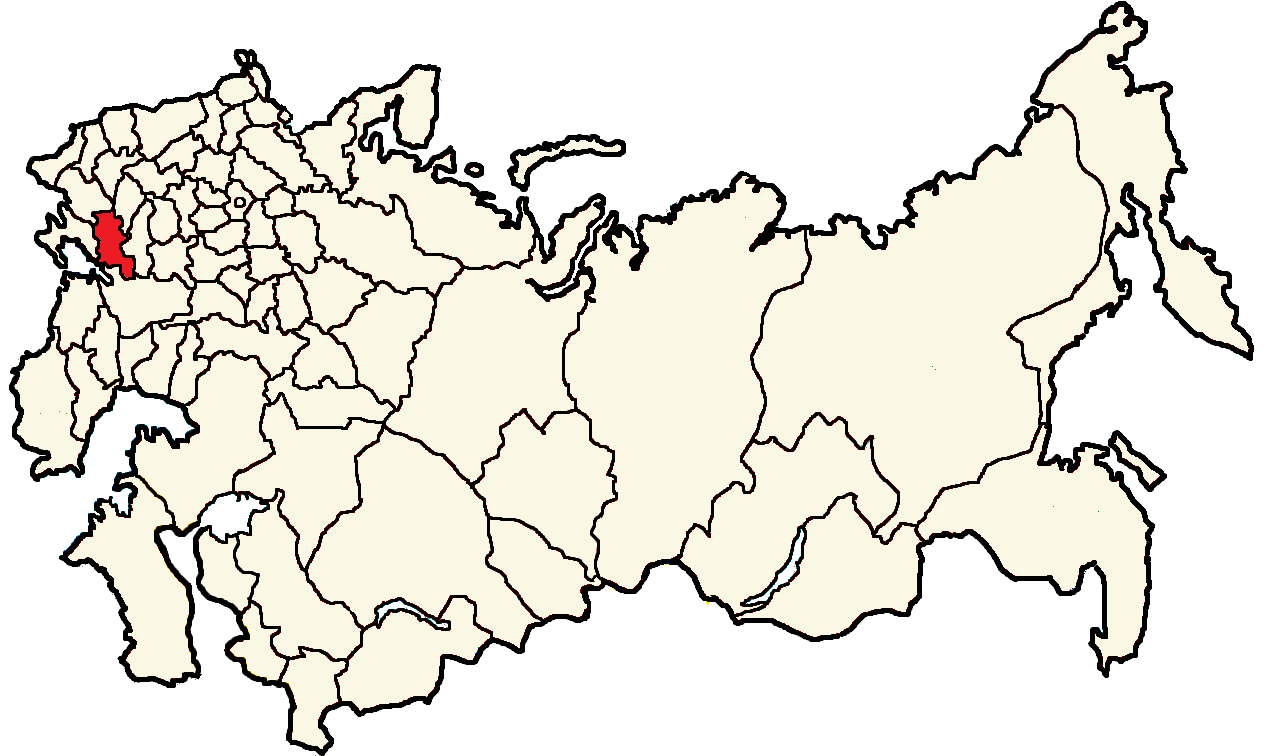

The electoral district covered the Yekaterinoslav Governorate. Yekaterinoslav was a large province; ethnically and economically diverse. The Yekaterinoslav electoral district recorded the highest vote for a landowners list in the country. List 1 Landowners and Nonpartisan Progressives gathered 26,597 votes (2.2%), and was headed by Mikhail Rodzianko (an Octobrist leader, having served as the presiding officer in the 3rd and 4th Dumas, elected on the Stolypin franchise).

Ekaterinoslav
Party	Vote	%	Seats
List 5 - Bloc of Ukrainian Socialist-Revolutionaries, Selyanska Spilka, Soviet of Peasant Deputies, Ukrainian Soc.-Dem. Labour Party	556,012	46.60	10
List 3 - Socialist-Revolutionaries	231,717	19.42	4
List 9 - Bolsheviks, Bakhmut Soviet of Peasants Deputies	213,163	17.87	4
List 10 - Jewish National Electoral Committee	37,032	3.10	
List 7 - Kadets	27,551	2.31	
List 12 - Mensheviks	26,909	2.26	
List 1 - Landowners and Nonpartisan Progressives	26,597	2.23	
List 14 - Russian Citizens of German Nationality	25,977	2.18	
List 4 - Popular Socialists-Cooperative alliance	9,496	0.80	
List 13 - Greek Settlement of Mariupol uezd	9,143	0.77	
List 6 - Orthodox-Farmers alliance	8,068	0.68	
List 15 - Unity	7,363	0.62	
List 2 - United Jewish Socialist Labour Party (S.S. and E.S.)	5,831	0.49	
List 11 - Bund	4,883	0.41	
List 8 - Poalei Zion	3,307	0.28	
Total:	1,193,049		18

Deputies Elected
Gvozdikovsky	SR
Popov	SR
Rosenblum	SR
Socheva	SR
Bachinsky	Ukrainian SR
Karpenko	Ukrainian SR
Korzh	Ukrainian SR
Mitsyuk	Ukrainian SR
Radomsky	Ukrainian SR
Romanenko	Ukrainian SR
Rosin	Ukrainian SR
Storubel	Ukrainian SR
Stromenko	Ukrainian SR
Surgae	Ukrainian SR
Averin	Bolshevik
Lutovinov	Bolshevik
Petrovsky	Bolshevik
Voroshilov	Bolshevik

==== Kherson ====
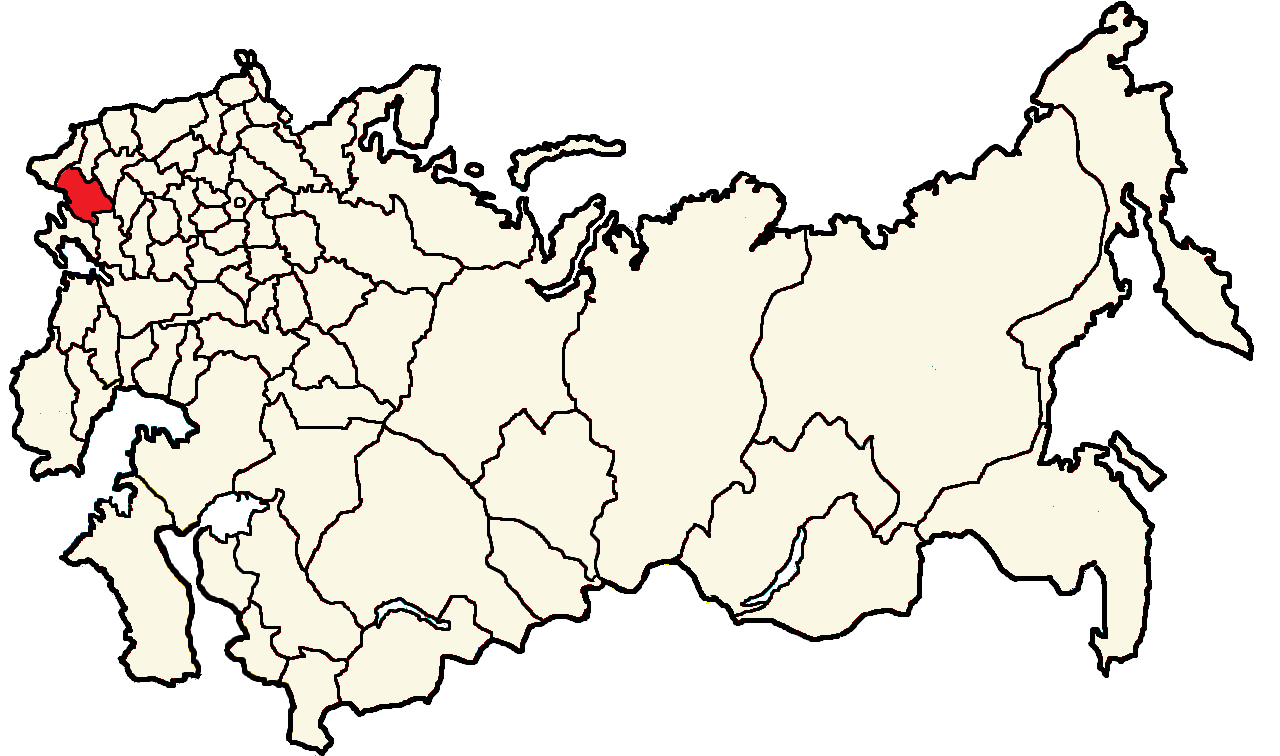

The electoral district covered the Kherson Governorate. According to Radkey, the Odessa city results appeared complete, the Odessa uezd possibly incomplete, the Kherson uezd having results from 195 out of 223 voting centers, no indication about whether 2 other uezds' results were complete or not. From the remaining 2 uezds the results were missing altogether.

Kherson
Party	Vote	%
List 4 - Ukrainian SRs, SRs and the United Jewish Socialist Labour Party (S.S. and E.S.)	266,771	42.98
List 10 - Jewish Bloc	86,190	13.89
List 9 - Bolsheviks	81,826	13.18
List 8 - Ukrainian Soc.-Dem. Labour Party	63,159	10.18
List 5 - Kadets	53,770	8.66
List 3 - Russian Citizens of German Nationality	27,879	4.49
List 7 - Mensheviks-Bund	14,369	2.31
List 1 - [Orthodox] Clergy and Laymen	13,038	2.10
List 11 - Popular Socialists	5,626	0.91
List 2 - Russian Popular State Union (Rightists)	4,217	0.68
List 12 - Old Believers	2,188	0.35
List 6 - Poalei Zion	1,687	0.27
Total:	620,720	

Deputies Elected
Gruzenberg	Jewish National Bloc
Tyomkin	Jewish National Bloc
Meiendorf	German
Asmolov	SR
Bontzarevich	SR
Eremenchuk	SR
Feofilaktov	SR
Gavrilyuk	SR
Glevenko	SR
Holubovych	SR
Gordievsky	SR
Lvovich	SR
Richter	SR
Trichevsky	SR
Troichuk	SR
Vekhtev	SR
Yuritsin	SR
Velikhov	Kadet
Chekhivsky	Ukrainian SD
Sklyar	Bolshevik

=== South ===
==== Bessarabia ====
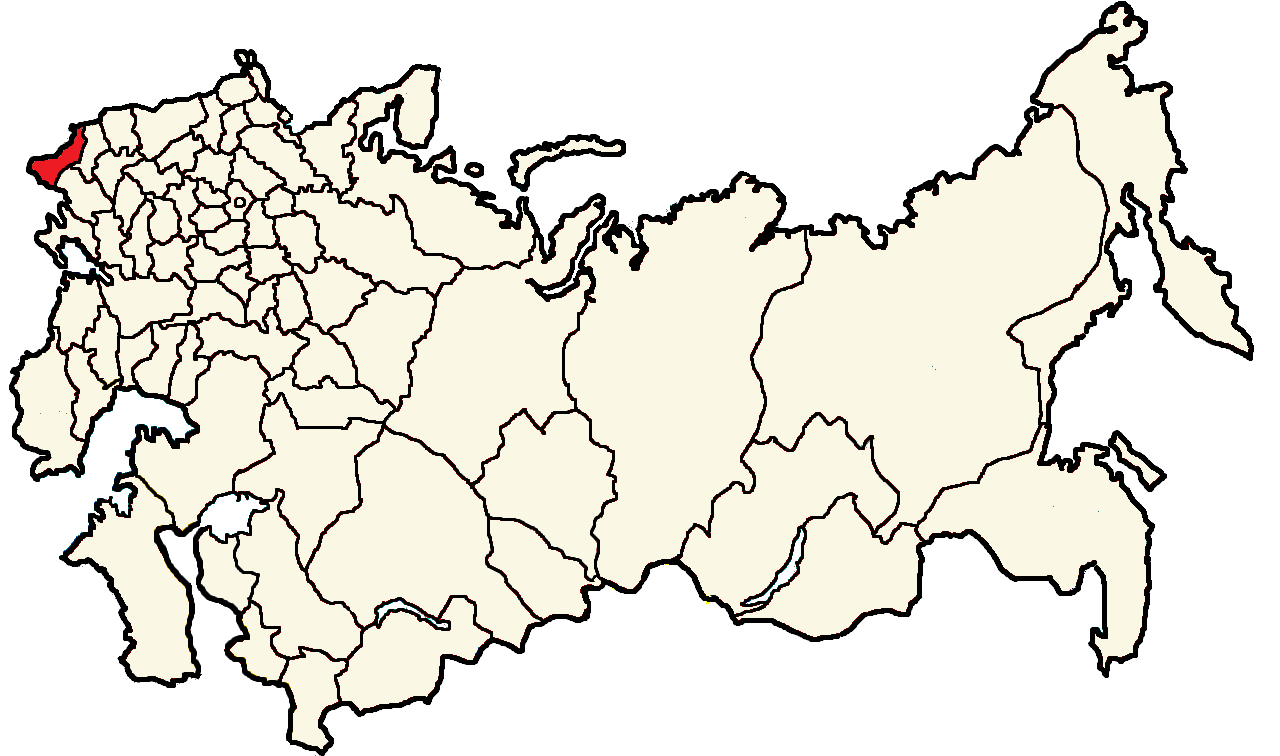

Radkey's account is substantially incomplete. According to Radkey, only the results from Kishinev and 3 out of 8 uezds could be gathered by scholars. The 5 uezds left out of the count were more populous. Two other sets have been published: one by Moldovan historian Gheorghe Cojocaru, providing a detailed account of the civilian votes, covering almost two thirds of the ones cast in Bessarabia, and a reportedly complete set provided by Soviet author G. Ustinov. 17 lists were in the fray in Bessarabia. The demographics of the district were divided between Romanians (48%), Ukrainians (20%) and Russians (8%). Among the elected deputies, SR deputies were Jewish or Russian, whilst the peasant soviet deputies were Romanian.

As per Serge, some 600,000 people took part in the vote, with the Peasant soviet obtaining some 200,000 votes, SRs 200,000 votes, Jewish national list 60,000, Kadets 40,000 and the Moldavian National Party 14,000.

Bessarabia
Party	Vote (Radkey)	% (Radkey)	% (Rus)
List 2 - Socialist-Revolutionaries	85,349	33.63	31.6
List 1 - Soviet of Peasants' Deputies	69,085	27.22	35.3
List 9 - Jewish National Electoral Committee	28,785	11.34	10.2
List 8 - Bolsheviks- Menshevik-Internationalists	25,569	10.07	8.2
List 5 - Kadets	16,545	6.52	n/a
List 6 - Moldovan National Party and the Bessarabian Union of Credit and Savings Associations	6,643	2.62	2.1
List 3 - Union of Landowners	5,246	2.07	n/a
List 11- Ukrainian Socialist Organizations	4,241	1.67	4.1
List 4 - Bund-Mensheviks	1,438	0.57	n/a
List 10 - Bessarabian Popular Socialist Labour Party	376	0.15	n/a
List 7 - Socialist Party of the Workers of the South-East Railway	?		n/a
List 12 - Union of Citizens of German Nationality	?		n/a
List 13 - Cooperative Group	?		n/a
List 14 - 3rd section of the Telitsky volost of Bendery uezd	?		n/a
List 15 - Inhabitants of Telitsky volost	?		n/a
List 16 - 4th section of the Telitsky volost	?		n/a
List 17 - Poalei Zion	?		n/a
Unaccounted	10,536	4.15	n/a
Total:	253,813		n/a

Deputies Elected
Cojocari	Peasants Soviets
Erhan	Peasants Soviets
Inculet	Peasants Soviets
Katoros	Peasants Soviets
Rudev	Peasants Soviets
Aleksandrov	SR
Imas	SR
Slonim	SR
Sukhovikh	SR
Sukhovikh	SR
Avilov	Bolsheviks/Menshevik-Internationalists
Urusov	Kadet

==== Taurida ====
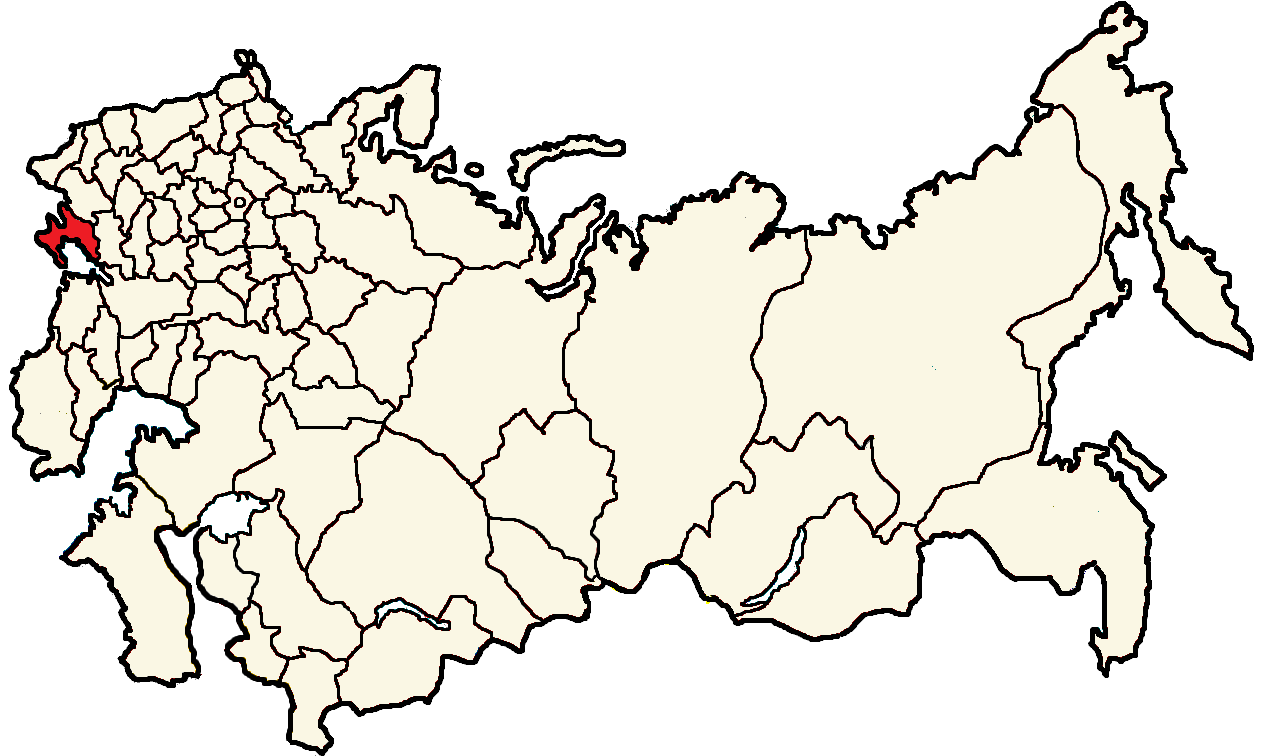

The electoral district covered the Taurida Governorate. Taurida had a 54.74% voter turnout. Radkey's account is missing Berdiansk uezd with some 3,400 electors and Vodiansk volost of Melitopol uezd. All in all there were 753 precincts in the Taurida electoral district.

Taurida
Party	Vote	%
List 5 - Socialist-Revolutionaries	300,100	52.22
List 9 - Muslims	68,581	11.93
List 3 - Ukrainian Socialist-Revolutionaries	61,541	10.71
List 1 - Kadets	38,794	6.75
List 3 - Bolsheviks	31,612	5.50
List 10 - Germans	27,681	4.82
List 6 - Mensheviks	15,176	2.64
List 11 - Jewish Nationalists	13,986	2.43
List 12 - Landowner	7,715	1.34
List 2 - Popular Socialists	4,643	0.81
List 7 - Unity	2,273	0.40
List 8 - Poalei Zion	1,745	0.30
Molokan	885	0.15
Total:	574,732	

Deputies Elected
Bogdanov	Kadet
Saltan	Ukrainian SR
Alyasov	SR
Bakuta	SR
Bondar	SR
Nikonov	SR
Popov	SR
Tolstov	SR
Zak	SR
Seidamet	Provisional Crimean; Muslim Executive Committee

=== South-East ===
==== Don Cossack Region ====
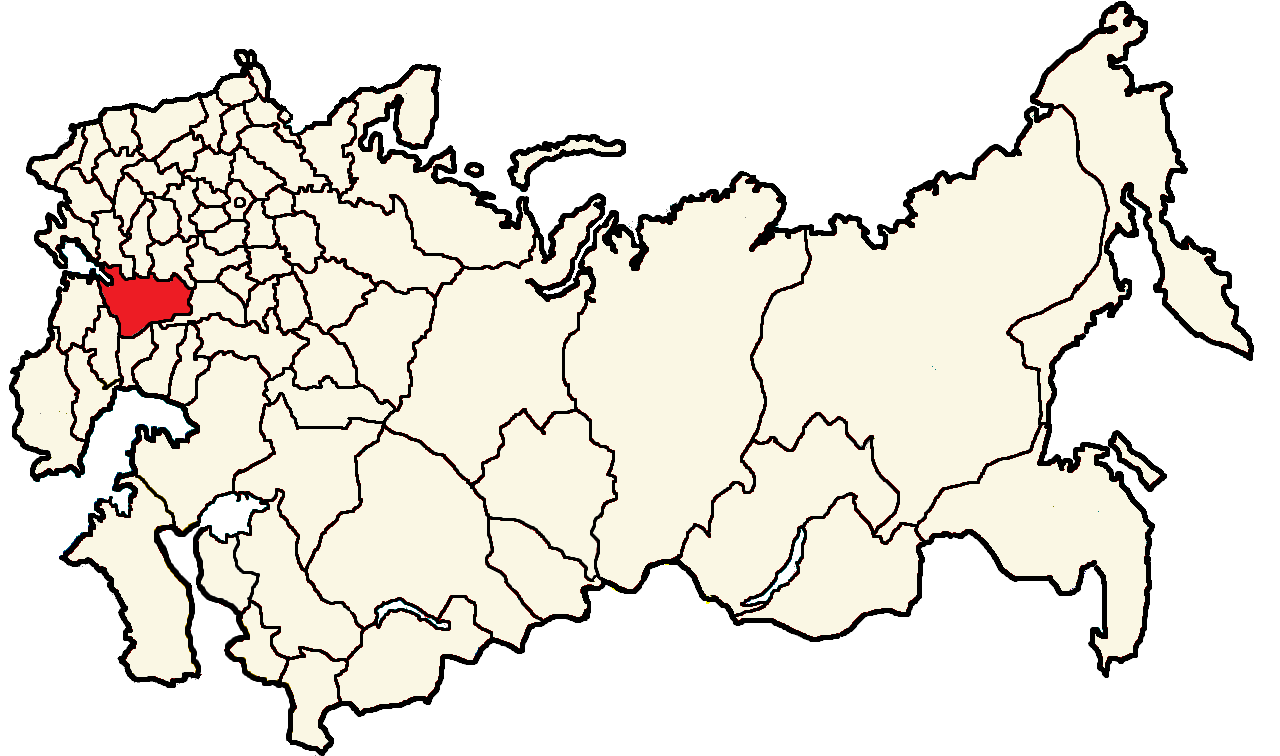

The electoral district covered the Don Host Oblast.

Don Cossack Region
Party	Vote	%	Seats
List 4 - Cossack	636,966	45.28	9
List 2 - Socialist-Revolutionaries	478,901	34.05	7
List 5 - Bolsheviks	205,497	14.61	3
List 6 - Kadets	43,345	3.08	
List 8 - Mensheviks	17,504	1.24	
List 3 - Old Believer	8,183	0.58	
List 1 - Bloc of Socialists (right-wing socialists, incl. Unity)	5,718	0.41	
List 9 - Landowners	5,457	0.39	
List 7 - Popular Socialists-Cooperative alliance	5,049	0.36	
Total:	1,406,620		19

Deputies Elected
Babin	SR
Kolesnikov	SR
Kurilov	SR
Mamonov	SR
Nikolaev	SR
Nikolsky	SR
Shvetsov	SR
Ageyev	Cossack
Arakantsev	Cossack
Bogaevsky	Cossack
Kaledin	Cossack
Kharlamov	Cossack
Melnikov	Cossack
Popov	Cossack
Ulanov	Cossack
Voronkov	Cossack
Lozovsky	Bolshevik
Syrtsov	Bolshevik
Vasilchenko	Bolshevik

==== Stavropol ====
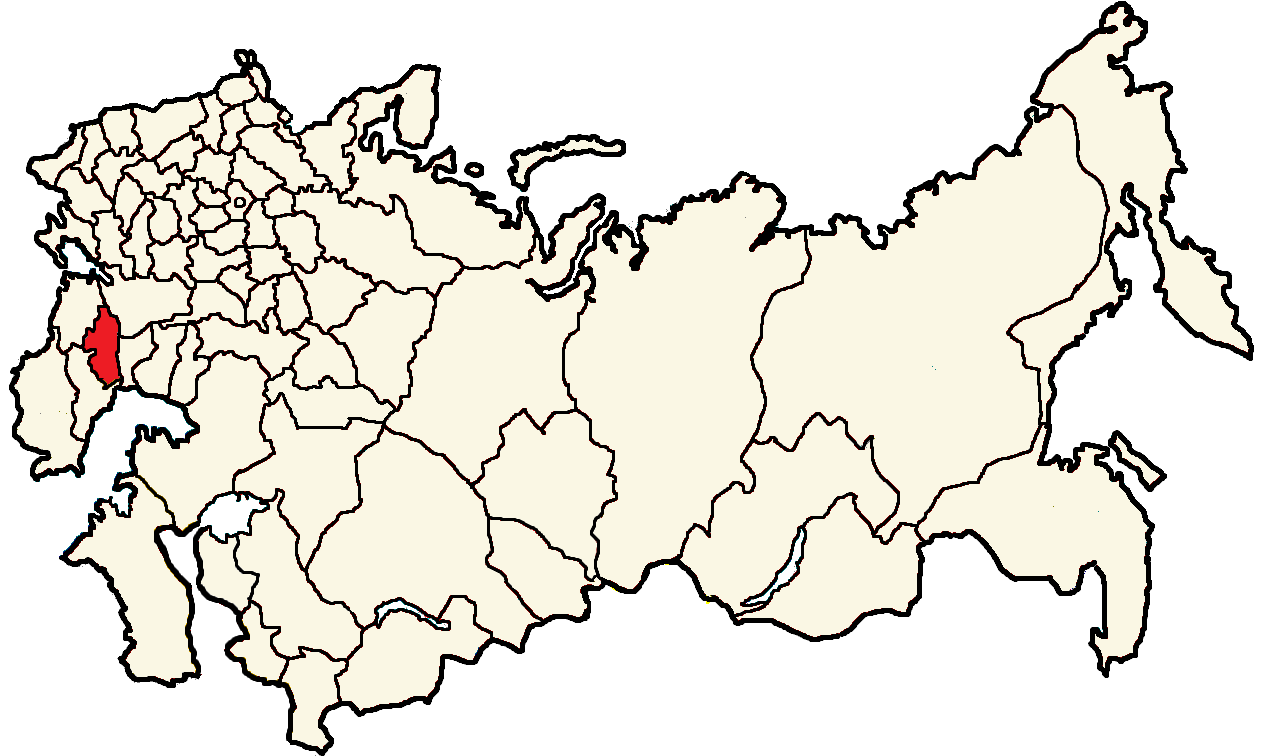

The electoral district covered the Stavropol Governorate, as well as the Karanogai precinct (which was part of the Terek Oblast). In Stavropol town the Bolsheviks won 47.6% of the vote. Likewise, in Pyatigorsk the Bolsheviks won some 8,000 votes, half of the votes from the town.

Stavropol
Party	Vote	%	Seats
List 1 - Socialist-Revolutionaries and Soviet of Peasants Deputies	291,395	88.69	6
List 2 - Bolsheviks	17,430	5.31	
List 5 - Kadets	10,938	3.33	
List 3 - Farmers	3,205	0.98	
List 4 - [Orthodox] Clergy and Worshippers	3,078	0.94	
List 7 - Mensheviks	1,836	0.56	
List 6 - Popular Socialists- and Cooperativists	670	0.20	
Total:	328,552		6

Deputies Elected
Bocharnikov	SR
Dementiev	SR
Emelyanov	SR
Garnitsky	SR
Gutorov	SR
Onipko	SR

==== Kuban-Black Sea ====
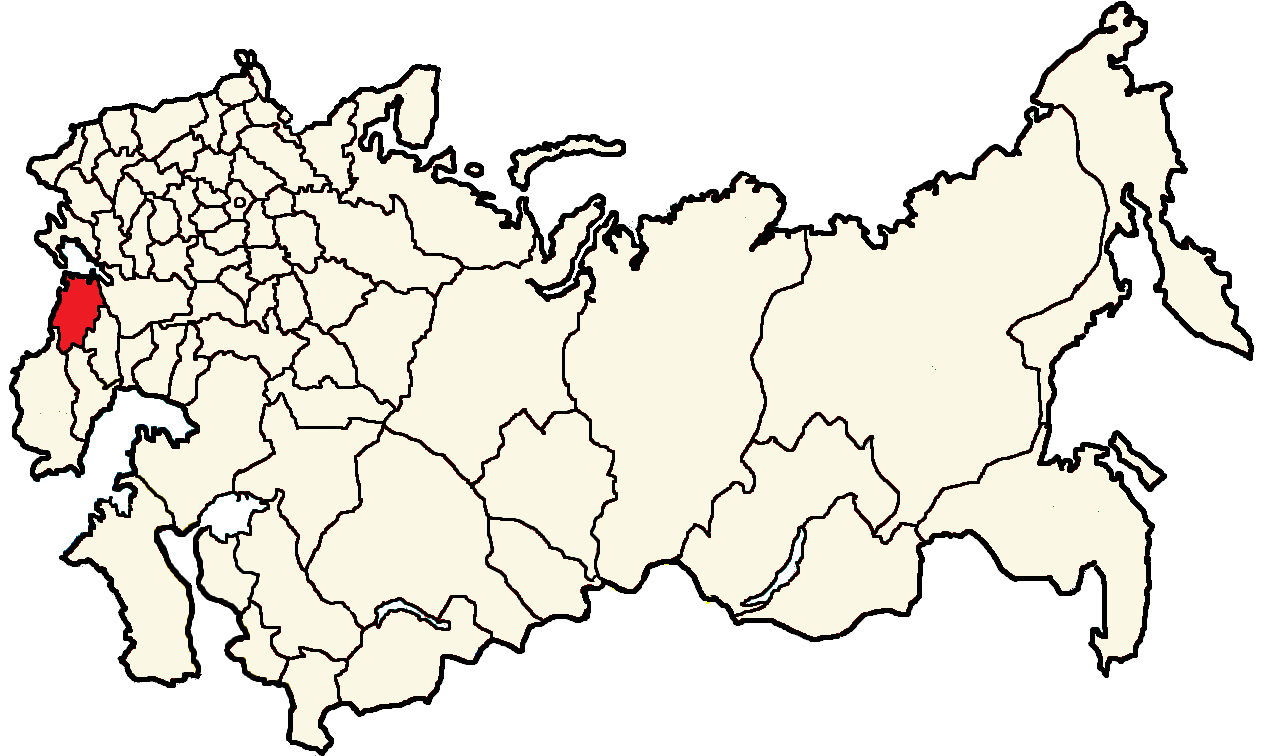

The electoral district covered the Kuban Oblast and the Black Sea Governorate. Kuban was fully engulfed by civil war by the time of the vote. 16 seats had been allotted to the Kuban-Black Sea electoral district, but the election was only held in Ekaterinodar and some surrounding villages were the Kuban Territorial Council was in control. Spirin gives the following result for Ekaterinodar;

Ekaterinodar
Party	Vote	%
List 2 - Bolsheviks	8,744	46.0
List 3 - Highlanders and Cossacks	3,544	18.6
List 1 - Kadets	3,206	16.9
List 4 - Socialist-Revolutionaries	2,268	11.9
List 8 - Mensheviks	786	4.1
List 1 - Leftist SRs	357	1.9
Ukrainians (Lists 5 and 9)	98	0.6

=== Caucasus ===
==== Ter-Dagestan ====
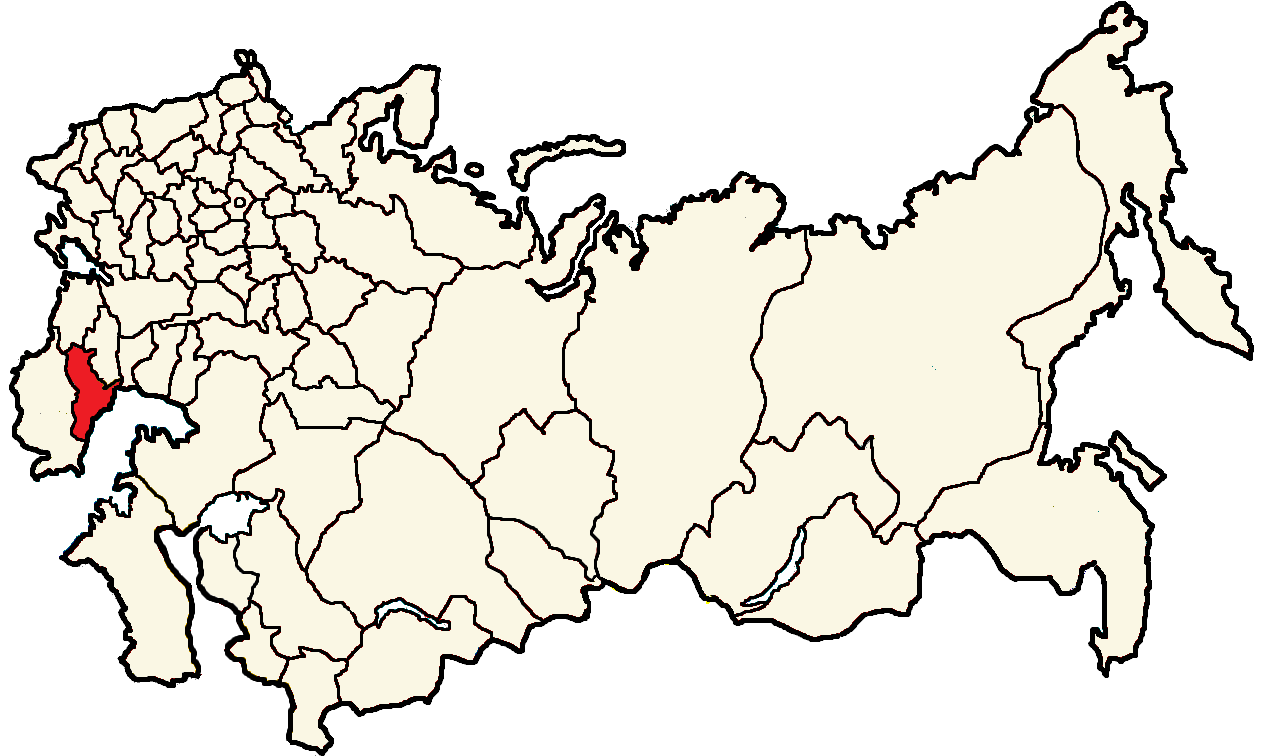

The electoral district covered the Terek Oblast (except the Karanogai precinct and the aimak of the Kalmyks) and the Dagestan Oblast. Voting was delayed in Ter-Dagestan and was held between November 26 and December 5. In some areas the votes were counted but not reported, in other areas votes were left uncounted. In Radkey's account a complete result was only available for Vladikavkaz city. He includes sporadic results of the major parties in some towns and garrisons. Radkey's account contains no results from rural areas.

Bolsheviks obtained 44% of the vote in Vladikavkaz. This situation could be compared to that by March 1917 the Bolshevik Party had been so weak in the city that it had been decided to form a joint Bolshevik-Menshevik Party Committee in the city.

Terek-Dagestan
Party	Vote	%
List 7 - Bolsheviks	21,495	55.95
List 5 - Kadets	7,725	20.11
List 8 - Socialist-Revolutionaries	4,292	11.17
List 1 - Cossack	3,062	7.97
List 4 - Mensheviks	958	2.49
List 9 - Chechen-Ingush Peoples	332	0.86
List 10 - Ukrainians	209	0.54
List 2 - Popular Socialists	53	0.14
List 3 - Muslim National Committee	?	
List 6 - Kabardian and Balkarian people and the Russian population of the Nalchik district	?	
List 11 - Dagestan Socialist Group	?	
Unaccounted	291	0.76
Total:	38,417	

==== Pricaspian ====
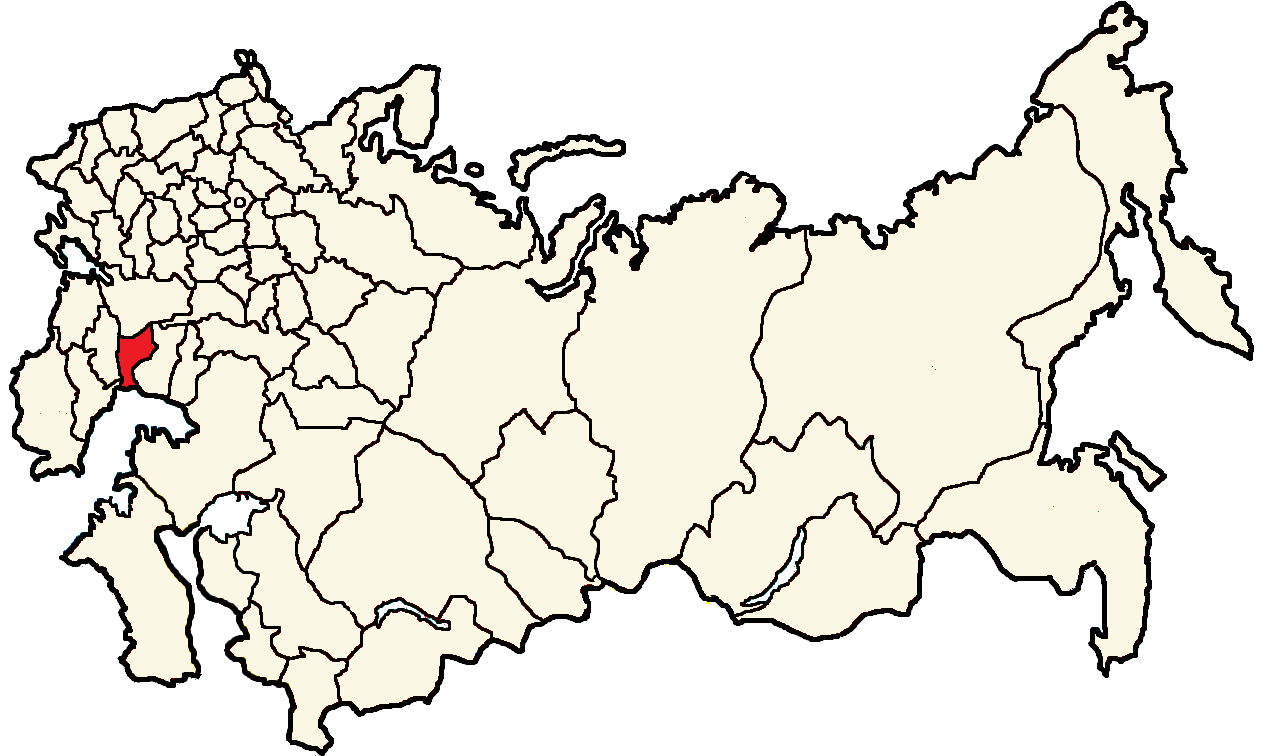

The Pricaspian electoral district, which included areas of the Kalmyk steppe of the Astrakhan Governorate, was thinly populated. One seat was assigned to the constituency. A list was submitted, signed by 137 electors, with the 33-year old lawyer Sandzhi Bayanovich Bayanov as its candidate. Due to late arrival of electoral material, the vote was postponed to November 26–28, 1917. The vote was reportedly held on these dates, in some places with very low turnout. Bayanov received a majority of votes.

Deputies Elected
Bayanov	?

==== Transcaucasus ====
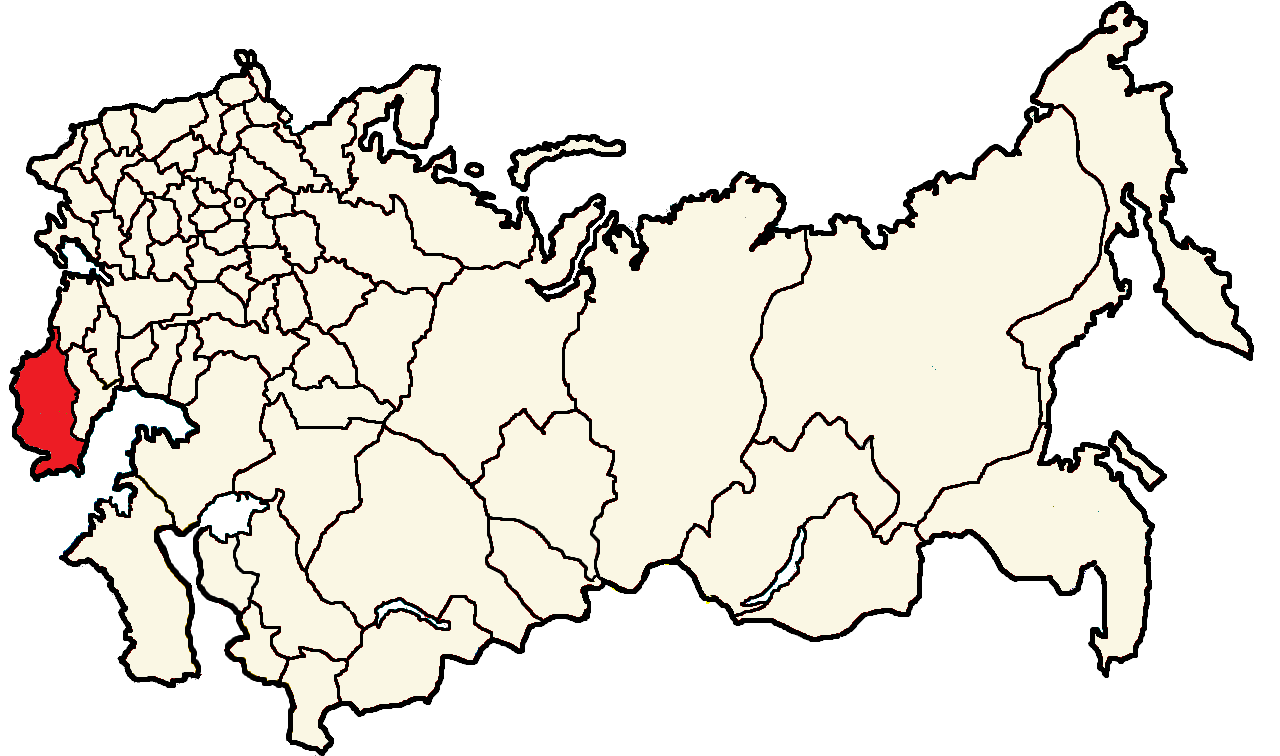

The electoral district covered the Baku Governorate, the Elizavetpol Governorate, the Erivan Governorate, the Kutais Governorate, the Tiflis Governorate, the Batum Oblast, the Kars Oblast, the Sukhum Okrug and the Zakatal Okrug.

The three largest parties in Transcaucasus were the Mensheviks, the Musavat Party and the Armenian Revolutionary Federation (Dashnaksiun). Whilst the Mensheviks were the most voted party, here Menshevism had become intertwined with Georgian nationalism. Soon after the election, the Georgian Mensheviks would become openly nationalistic. Bolsheviks won the election Baku city (followed closely by Musavat and Dashnaksiun), Ittihad won the elections in the rural areas of Baku uezd, in the villages of the Absheron Peninsula. Musavat won most of the Azerbaijani vote in Baku guberniia, followed by Ittehad. In Tiflis the Bolsheviks quadrupled their vote compared to the July 1917 city duma election.

The numbers in the column to the left originate from Hovannisian (1967) and Vestnik Evrazii (2004) The source for Vestnik Evrazii for the results stems from the State Archive of the Russian Federation.

These two references present a more complete account than that of Radkey. Radkey's account lists a total of 1,887,453 votes, including 215,121 unspecified 'residue' votes. Radkey's effort to map the votes in Transcaucasus was frustrated by the insistence of Soviet sources to lump parties like Musavat and Dashnaksiun into a single bloc.

Between Hovannisian and Vestnik Evrazii, the votes for the Mensheviks, Kadets, SRs and Bolsheviks are identical. Vestnik Evrazii presents the vote for the Popular Socialist list, which is not detailed in Hovannasian. Vestnik Evrazii groups the Dashnaks, the Muslim Socialist Bloc and Hummet together (825,672 votes) and 728,206 for Bourgeois parties (presumably including Musavat). In the case of Musavat, Hummet, Ittihad and Dashnaks, the figures from Hovannisian are used. Hovannisian does not present a total of votes, so the total from Vestnik Evrazii is utilized instead.

Comparing the account from Hovannisian with that of Swietochowski (2004) the numbers for the Mensheviks, Musavat, the Muslim Socialist Bloc, SRs, Hummet and Ittihad are identical. The minor discrepancies between Hovannisian and Swietochowski are different vote for Bolshevik list (93,581 in Hovannisian and Vestnik Evrazii, 95,581 in Switeochowski), the Dashnaks got 40 votes more in Swietochowski's account and Swietochowski lists a total of 2,455,274 (plus 2,172 compared to Vestnik Evrazii). Maḣmudov (2004) and Balaev (1998) carries the same numbers as Swietochowski.

The results in the column to the right is from the account of Soviet historian L. M. Spirin. Spirin's total is missing about half a million votes compared to the other accounts.

Transcaucasus
Party	Vote	%
List 1 - Mensheviks	661,934	26.96
List 10 - Musavat Party	615,816	25.08
List 4 - Armenian Revolutionary Federation	558,440	22.74
List 12 - Muslim Socialist Bloc	159,770	6.51
List 3 - Socialist-Revolutionaries	117,522	4.79
List 5 - Bolsheviks	93,581	3.81
List 11 - Hummet	84,743	3.45
List 14 - Ittihad	66,505	2.71
List 8 - Georgian National Democrats	25,733	1.05
List 2 - Kadets	25,637	1.04
List 6 - Georgian Socialist-Federalists	22,754	0.93
List 7 - Armenian Populist Party	15,180	0.62
List 15 - Zionists	7,018	0.29
List 9 - Popular Socialists	570	0.02
List 13 - Transcaucasian Muslims	71	0.00
Total:	2,455,274	

Transcaucasus per Spirin (1987)
Party	Vote	%
List 1 - Mensheviks	569,362	28.89
List 10 - Musavat Party	444,150	22.54
List 4 - Armenian Revolutionary Federation	436,333	22.14
List 12 - Muslim Socialist Bloc	140,143	7.11
List 3 - Socialist-Revolutionaries	105,553	5.36
List 5 - Bolsheviks	87,610	4.45
List 14 - Ittihad	66,162	3.36
List 11 - Hummet	34,463	1.75
List 2 - Kadets	24,612	1.25
List 8 - Georgian National Democrats	22,499	1.14
List 6 - Georgian Socialist-Federalists	19,042	0.97
List 7 - Armenian Populist Party	13,099	0.66
List 15 - Zionists	6,983	0.35
List 9 - Popular Socialists	514	0.03
List 13 - Western Transcaucasus Muslims	71	0.00
Total:	1,970,596	

Deputies Elected
Bekzadyan	Menshevik
Chkheidze	Menshevik
Chkhenkeli	Menshevik
Djibladze	Menshevik
Gegechkori	Menshevik
Georgadze	Menshevik
Lomtatidze	Menshevik
Ramishvili, I. V.	Menshevik
Ramishvili, N. V.	Menshevik
Skobelev	Menshevik
Smirnov	Menshevik
Tsereteli	Menshevik
Zhordania	Menshevik
Zurabov	Menshevik
Aghayev	Musavat
Jafarov	Musavat
Mamedbekov	Musavat
Rasulzadeh	Musavat
Sultanov	Musavat
Topchubashov	Musavat
Yusifbeyli	Musavat
Akhundov	Hummet
Gaidarov	Muslim Socialist Bloc
Kantemirov	Muslim Socialist Bloc
Safikurdski	Muslim Socialist Bloc
Ganiev	Ittihad
Atabekyan	SR
Lunkevich	SR
Ambartsumyan	Dashnak
Gazazyan	Dashnak
Hovhannisyan-Varandyan	Dashnak
Ohanjanyan	Dashnak
Shahatunyan	Dashnak
Shahnazaryan-Araratyan	Dashnak
Zavriev	Dashnak
Ter-Ovanesyan (Kachaznuni)	Dashnak
Tigranyan	Dashnak
Zoryan-Rostom	Dashnak
Shaumian	Bolshevik

=== Siberia ===
==== Tobolsk ====
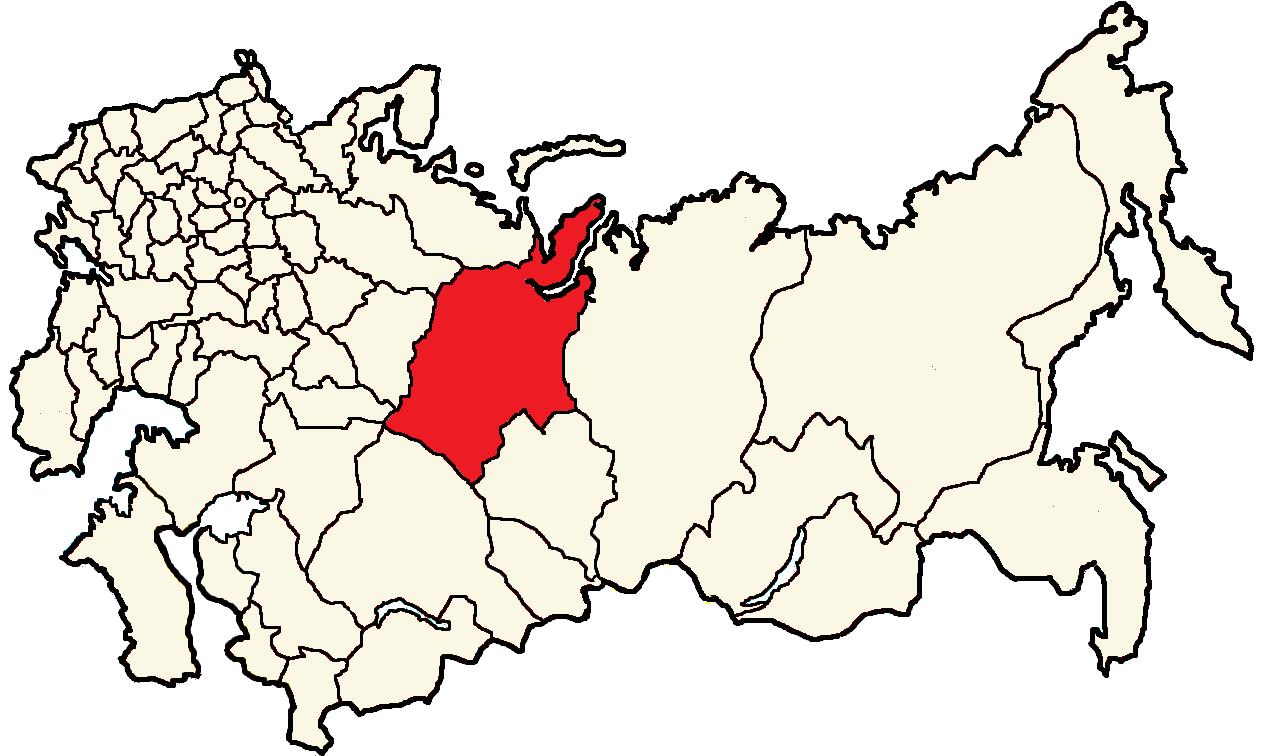

The electoral district covered the Tobolsk Governorate. Tobolsk hosted one of only 2 undivided Social Democratic lists in the fray across the country. Soviet sources indicated that the Social Democratic list was Menshevik-dominated.

Soviet sources reported voter turnout at a mere 33.5%.

Tobolsk
Party	Vote	%
List 5 - Socialist-Revolutionaries (Southern Group)	388,328	78.53
List 3 - Peasants Union-Popular Socialists alliance	50,780	10.27
List 4 - Muslims	25,830	5.22
List 1 - Kadets	13,793	2.79
List 2 - Menshevik-Bolshevik alliance	12,061	2.44
List 6 - Socialist-Revolutionaries (Northern Group), leftists	3,733	0.75
Total:	494,525	

Deputies Elected
Sukhanov, A. S.	Peasants Union- Popular Socialists alliance
Barantsev	SR
Evdokimov	SR
Gul'tyaev	SR
Ivanitsky-Vasilenko	SR
Kotelnikov	SR
Krasnousov	SR
Mikhailov	SR
Mukhin	SR
Sukhanov, P. S.	SR

==== Steppes ====
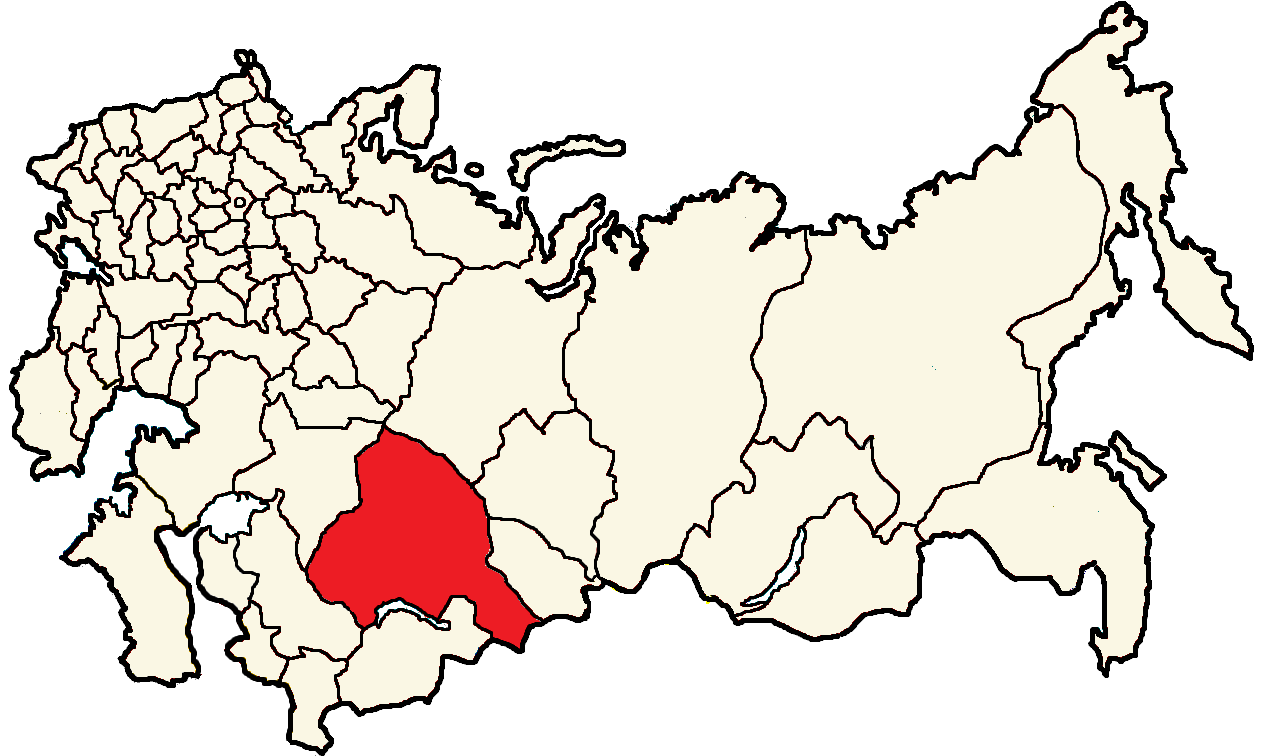

The electoral district covered the Akmolinsk Oblast and the Semipalatinsk Oblast. According to Wade (2004), it is unclear whether the election was carried through to completion in the electoral district.

Radkey's account only includes votes from Omsk and surroundings;

Steppe (only Omsk and surroundings)
Party	Vote	%
List 3 - Bolsheviks	11,681	37.71
List 6 - Kadets	4,925	15.90
List 10 - United Socialists (Mensheviks-Rightwing Socialist Bloc)	4,712	15.21
List 8 - Socialist-Revolutionaries	4,018	12.97
List 11 - Kirghiz Socialists	1,841	5.94
List 4 - Menshevik-Internationalists	1,660	5.36
List 1 - Cossack	1,069	3.45
List 2 - [Orthodox] Clergy and Laymen	555	1.79
List 5 - Alash	181	0.58
List 7 - Tatars	?	
List 9 - Cossacks-Socialists	?	
List 12 - Germans	?	
List 13 - Muslim-Democrats	?	
List 14 - [Orthodox] Clergy and Laymen of Petropavlovsk	?	
Unaccounted	332	1.07
Total:	30,974	

This account of the vote in Semipalatinsk uezd comes from the work of Spirin;

Steppe (only Semipalatinsk uezd)
Party	Vote	%
List 5 - Alash	58,331	85.63
List 8 - Socialist-Revolutionaries	3,375	4.95
List 1 - Cossack	3,136	4.60
List 3 - Bolsheviks	1,910	2.80
List 9 - Cossacks-Socialists	475	0.70
List 7 - Tatars	468	0.69
List 2 - [Orthodox] Clergy and Laymen	150	0.22
List 4 - Menshevik-Internationalists	115	0.17
List 6 - Kadets	106	0.16
List 10 - United Socialists (Mensheviks-Rightwing Socialist Bloc)	19	0.03
List 13 - Muslim-Democrats	14	0.02
List 12 - Germans	11	0.02
List 14 - [Orthodox] Clergy and Laymen of Petropavlovsk	5	0.01
List 11 - Kirghiz Socialists	2	0.00
Total:	68,117	

==== Tomsk ====
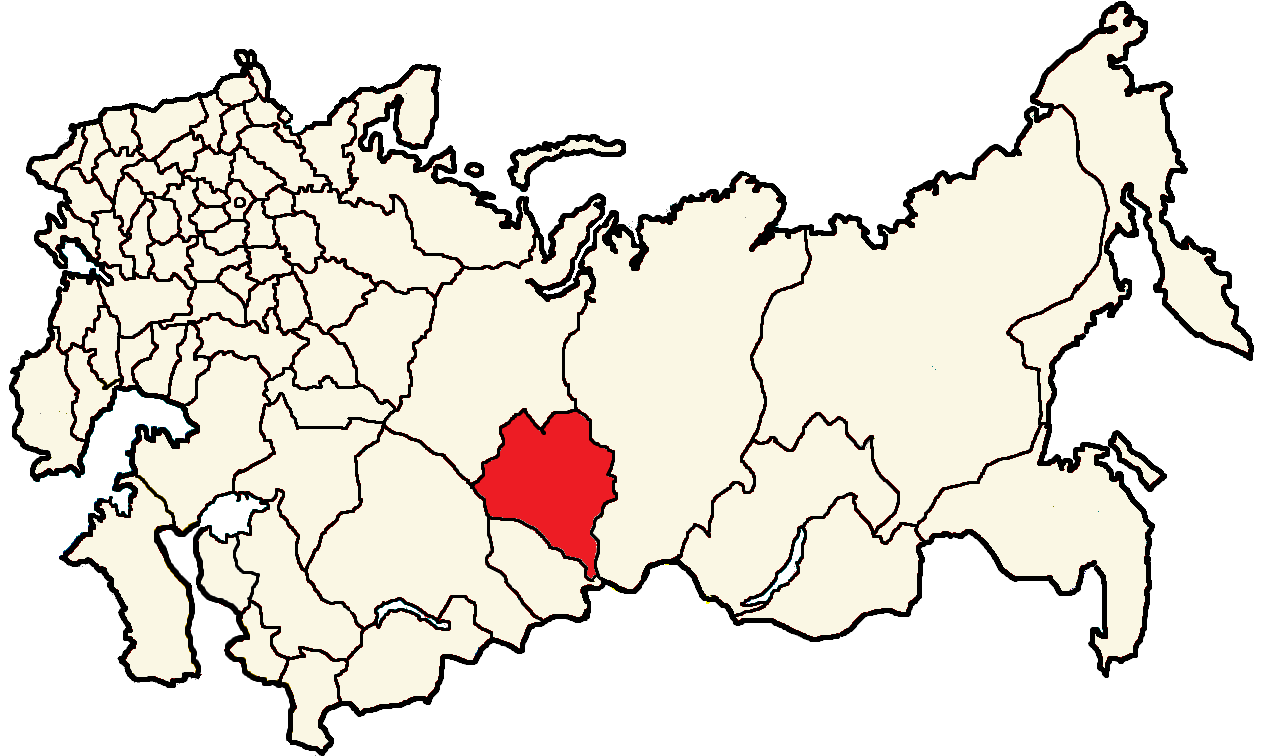

The electoral district covered the Tomsk Governorate. The SR list won a landslide victory, drawing the support from the rural areas. In the Novonikolayevsk uyezd the SRs obtained 95.3% of the votes cast, followed by Kainsk uyezd (91%), Kuznetsk uyezd (90.8%), Mariinsk uyezd (88.6%), Tomsk uyezd (73.6%) and Togur uyezd (64.6%). The Bolsheviks fared better in industrial centers; obtaining some 36% of the vote at the Kemerovo mine and chemical plant, some 32% of the votes were cast at the Anzhersky mines and 25.8% of the votes at the Sudzhensk mines (both in present-day Anzhero-Sudzhensk).

Tomsk
Party	Vote	%
List 2 - Socialist-Revolutionaries	541,153	85.16
List 3 - Bolsheviks	51,456	8.10
List 1 - Kadets	18,618	2.93
List 4 - Popular Socialists	15,802	2.49
List 5 - Mensheviks	5,769	0.91
List 6 - Cooperative Organizations of Tomsk Governorate	2,686	0.42
Total:	635,484	

Deputies Elected
Smirnov	Bolshevik
Grigoriev	SR
Lindberg	SR
Markov	SR
Markov	SR
Mikhailov	SR
Omelkov	SR
Semenov	SR
Shisharin	SR
Sukhomlin	SR

==== Altai ====
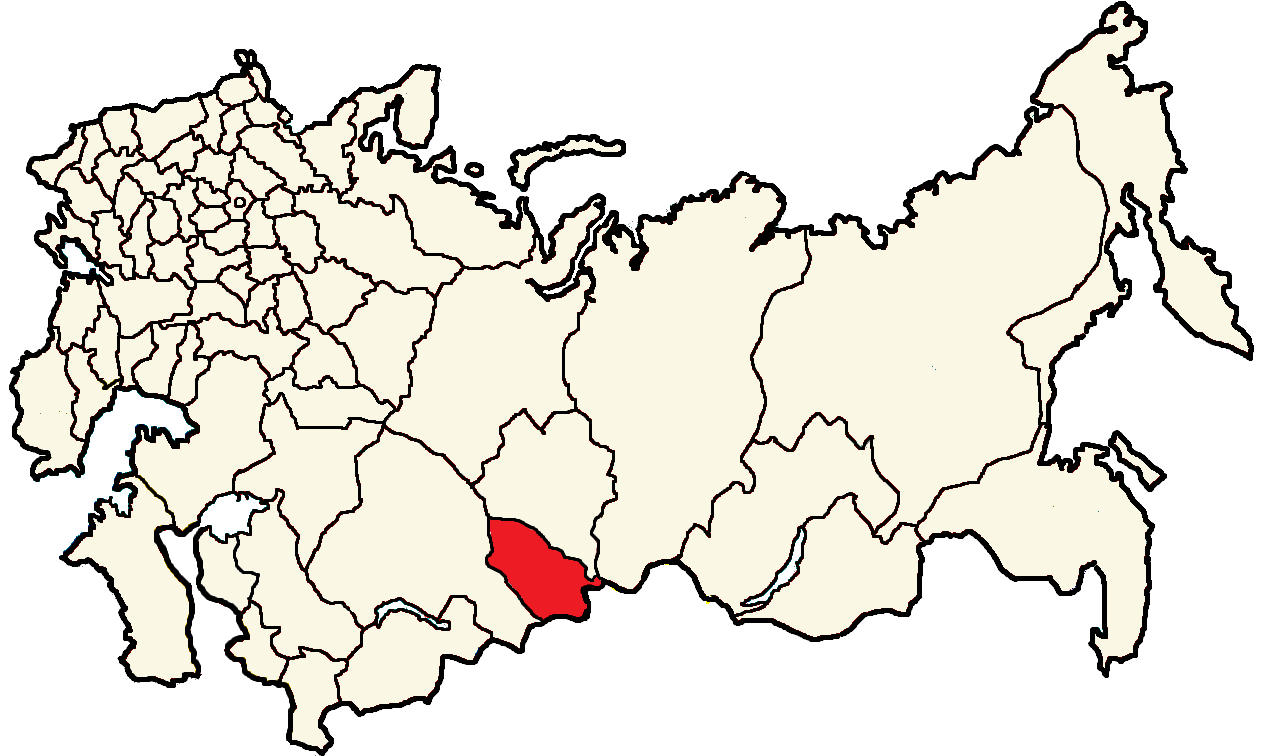

The electoral district covered the Altai Governorate.

Altai
Party	Vote	%	Seats
List 2 - Socialist-Revolutionaries	621,377	87.03	13
List 7 - Bolsheviks- Menshevik-Internationalists	45,268	6.34	
List 1 - Old Believers	17,292	2.42	
List 5 - Kadets	12,108	1.70	
List 6 - Russian Germans	8,048	1.13	
List 3 - Popular Socialists	6,068	0.85	
List 4 - Mensheviks	3,785	0.53	
Total:	713,946		13

Deputies Elected
Devisorov	SR
Krivorotov	SR
Levin	SR
Lomshakov	SR
Lyubimov	SR
Ramazanov	SR
Rogovsky	SR
Rudnev	SR
Sotnin	SR
Shaposhnikov	SR
Shnyrev	SR
Kosorotov	SR
Shatilov	SR

==== Yenisei ====
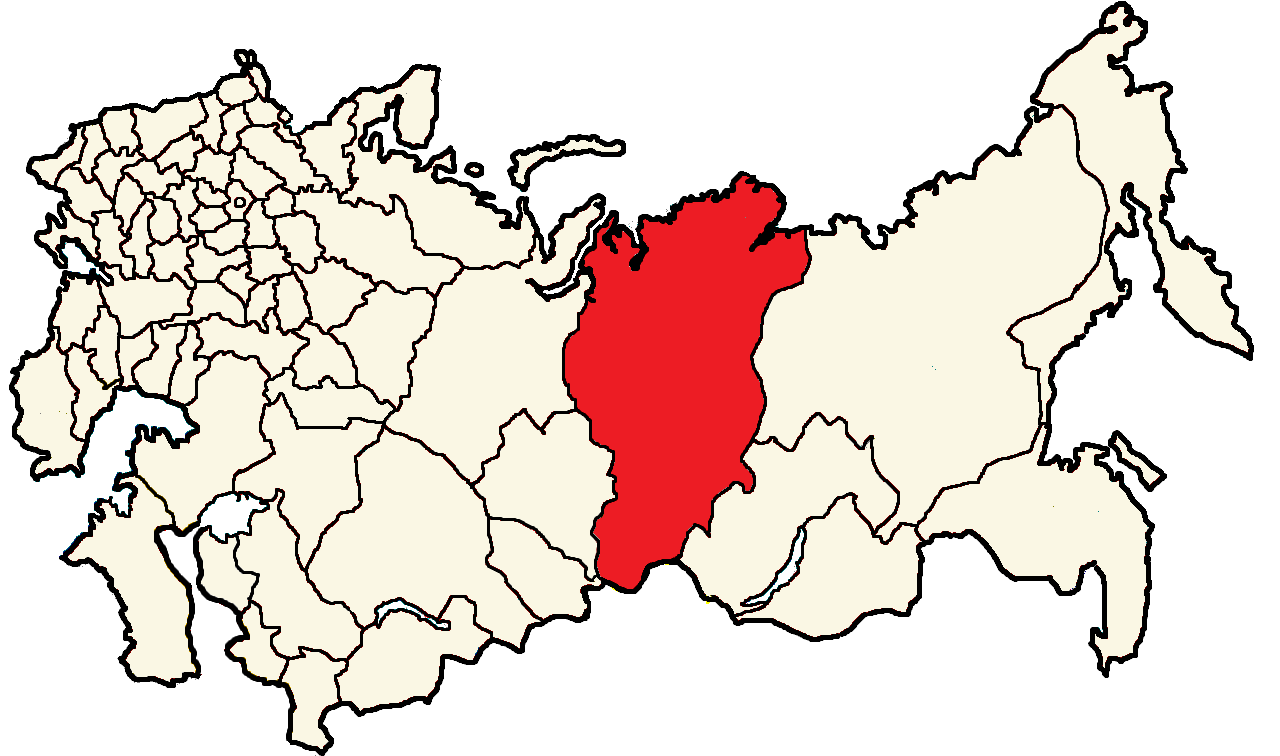

The electoral district covered the Yenisei Governorate. Moreover, the Russian citizens living in the Uryankhay Kray formed part of the constituency.

The SRs and Menshevik lists formed an electoral bloc, whilst the Bolsheviks and the leftist dissident SR list formed a second electoral bloc.

According to Radkey the results from Krasnoyarsk city and 5 out of 6 uezds appeared complete, with the thinly populated Turukhansk uezd missing.

Yenisei
Party	Vote	%	Seats
List 3 - Socialist-Revolutionaries	229,723	64.48	4
List 2 - Bolsheviks	95,307	26.75	2
List 1 - Kadets	12,017	3.37	
List 6 - Popular Socialists	8,703	2.44	
List 4 - Mensheviks	4,531	1.27	
List 5 - Internationalists (leftist SRs)	3,668	1.03	
List 7 - Siberian Autonomist	2,299	0.65	
Total:	356,248		6

Deputies Elected
Okulov	Bolshevik
Rogov	Bolshevik
Eideman	SR
Fomin	SR
Gurov	SR
Kolosov	SR

==== Irkutsk ====
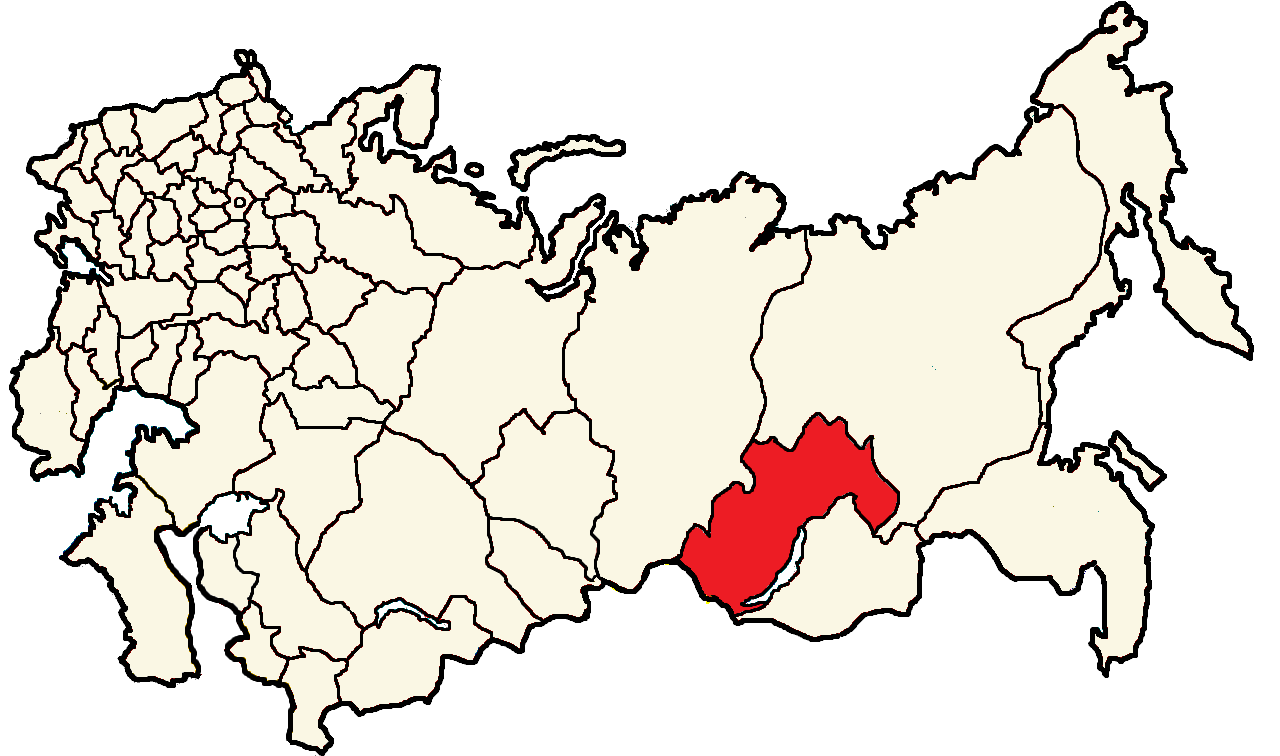

The electoral district covered the Irkutsk Governorate.

Irkutsk
Party	Vote	%	Seats
List 1 - Socialist-Revolutionaries and Peasants Union	113,378	54.47	3
List 5 - Buryat National Committee, SRs	39,248	18.85	1
List 7 - Bolsheviks and Menshevik-Internationalists	31,587	15.17	1
List 4 - Kadets	8,834	4.24	
List 3 - Siberian Autonomist and Popular Socialists	6,925	3.33	
List 2 - Mensheviks	5,534	2.66	
List 6 - Orthodox parishes	2,653	1.27	
Total:	208,159		5

Deputies Elected
Korshunov	SR
Krol	SR
Timofeev	SR
Vampiloon	Buryat
Gavrilov	Bolshevik

==== Transbaikal ====
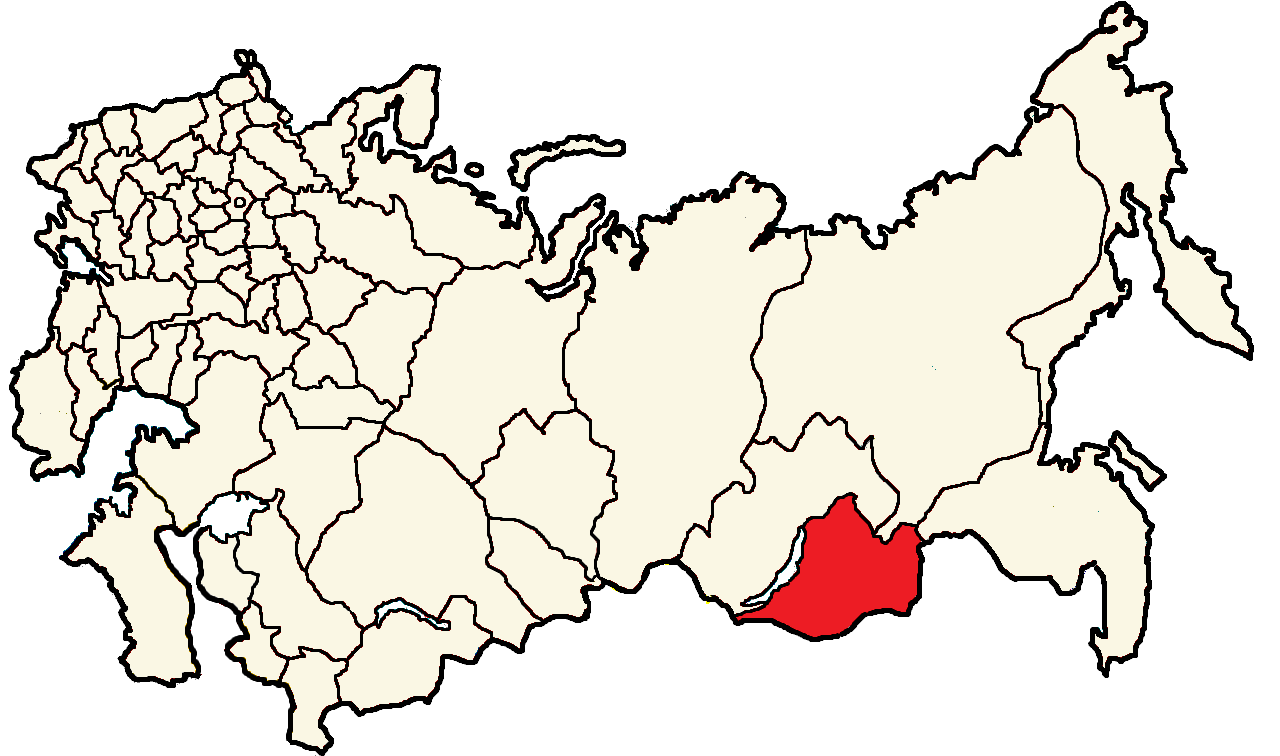

The electoral district covered the Transbaikal Oblast.

Transbaikal
Party	Vote	%
List 4 - Socialist-Revolutionaries	49,363	50.26
List 2 - Buryat National Committee	17,083	17.39
List 5 - Transbaikal Cossacks	12,854	13.09
List 1 - Bolsheviks- Menshevik-Internationalists	8,560	8.71
List 6 - Kadets	4,111	4.19
Popular Socialists: List 7 - Popular Socialists and Citizens of Barguzin Uezd; List 8 - Transbaikal Division of the Popular Socialists	2,682	2.73
List 3 - Mensheviks	2,154	2.19
List 9 - Union of Transbaikal Old Believers	1,418	1.44
Total:	98,225	

Deputies Elected
Bogdanov	Buryat National Committee
Dobromyslov	SR
Flegontov	SR
Kruglikov	SR
Pumpyanskiy	SR
Simakov	SR
Taskin	Transbaikal Cossacks

==== Priamur ====
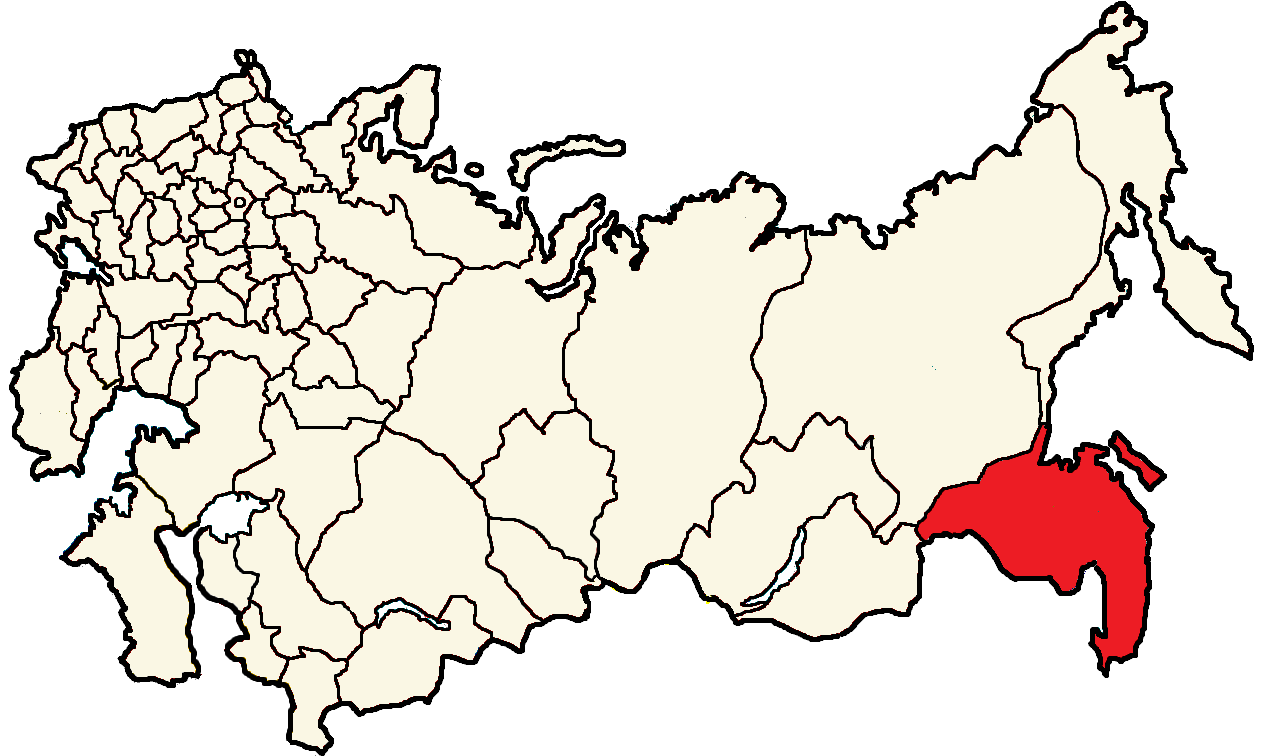

The Priamur electoral district consisted of the Amur Oblast, the Maritime Province and the Sakhalin Oblast. The election was held on time in the constituency. From the Maritime Province the results were, according to Radkey, seemingly complete. In areas north of the Amur river some problems in voting occurred, with 312 polling stations reporting and 77 did not (another reference stated that no election had been held in some 50 polling stations).

The SRs had suffered a four-way split in the constituency, with the branches in Amur and Maritime contesting separately. Ahead of the election the Maritime Province Peasants Soviets threw out the SR party representatives and fielded a separate list (in Amur, however, the peasants soviets stayed loyal to the SR party). There was also a left SR list, distinctively urban.

Amur-Maritime
Party	Vote	%
List 2 - Maritime Province Soviet of Peasants Deputies	56,718	27.08
List 7 - Amur Oblast Organization of Socialist-Revolutionaries	41,152	19.65
List 5 - Bolsheviks	40,850	19.50
List 3 - Amur and Ussuri Cossacks	22,612	10.80
List 9 - Kadets	17,233	8.23
List 4 - Mensheviks	15,458	7.38
List 1 - Maritime Province Socialist-Revolutionaries	6,513	3.11
List 8 - SRs of Vladivostok, Nikolayevsk-on-Amur and Spassk (leftist Socialist-Revolutionaries)	5,805	2.77
List 6 - Amur Oblast Ukrainian Council	3,125	1.49
Total:	209,466	

Deputies Elected
Mandrikov	Maritime Peasants Soviet
Petrov	Maritime Peasants Soviet
Sorokin	Maritime Peasants Soviet
Vykhristov	Maritime Peasants Soviet
Kozhevnikov	Amur and Ussuri Cossacks
Neibut	Bolshevik
Alekseevsky	Amur SR

==== Chinese Eastern Railroad ====
The Chinese Eastern Railroad electoral district was located outside the borders of Russia. Four candidates were nominated for the Chinese Eastern Railroad seat; Lieutenant General Dmitri Horvath (the Chinese Eastern Railroad Zone administrator since 1902) ran as the Kadet candidate, representing the pre-revolutionary status quo. Nikolai Strelkov of the Railwaymens' Union contested as the Menshevik candidate, the Jewish businessman and Chair of the Chinese Eastern Railroad Executive Committee Faytel Volfovich was the SR candidate and the ensign and Harbin Soviet chairman Ryutin the Bolshevik candidate.

The vote was held for the Chinese Eastern Railroad seat on November 29, 1917. The voter turnout stood at around 60%.

According to a contemporary account published in the organ of the Nikolsk-Ussuriysky Soviet (whose totals differ somewhat from the figures of Radkey), the vote in Harbin was won by Strelkov (4,874 votes, 31.74%), followed by Horvath (4,450 votes, 28.98%), Ryutin (4,412 votes, 28.73%) and Volfovich (1,620 votes, 10.55%). In the 26 precincts of the western line, Ryutin was the most vote candidate (5,991 votes, 38.25%), followed by Strelkov (5,845 votes, 37.32%), Volfovich (2,519 votes, 16.08%) and Horvath (1,307 votes, 8.35%). In the four precincts of the eastern line, Ryutin emerged as the winner with 1,461 votes (39.84%), followed by Strelkov (1,187 votes, 32.37%), Volfovich (831 votes, 22.66%) and Horvath (188 votes, 5.13%).

Chinese Eastern Railroad
Party	Vote	%	Seats
List 2 - Mensheviks	13,139	37.37	1
List 3 - Bolsheviks	10,612	30.18	
List 4 - Kadets	6,327	18.00	
List 1 - Socialist-Revolutionaries	5,081	14.45	
Total:'	35,159		1

Deputies Elected
Strelkov	Menshevik

==== Yakutsk ====
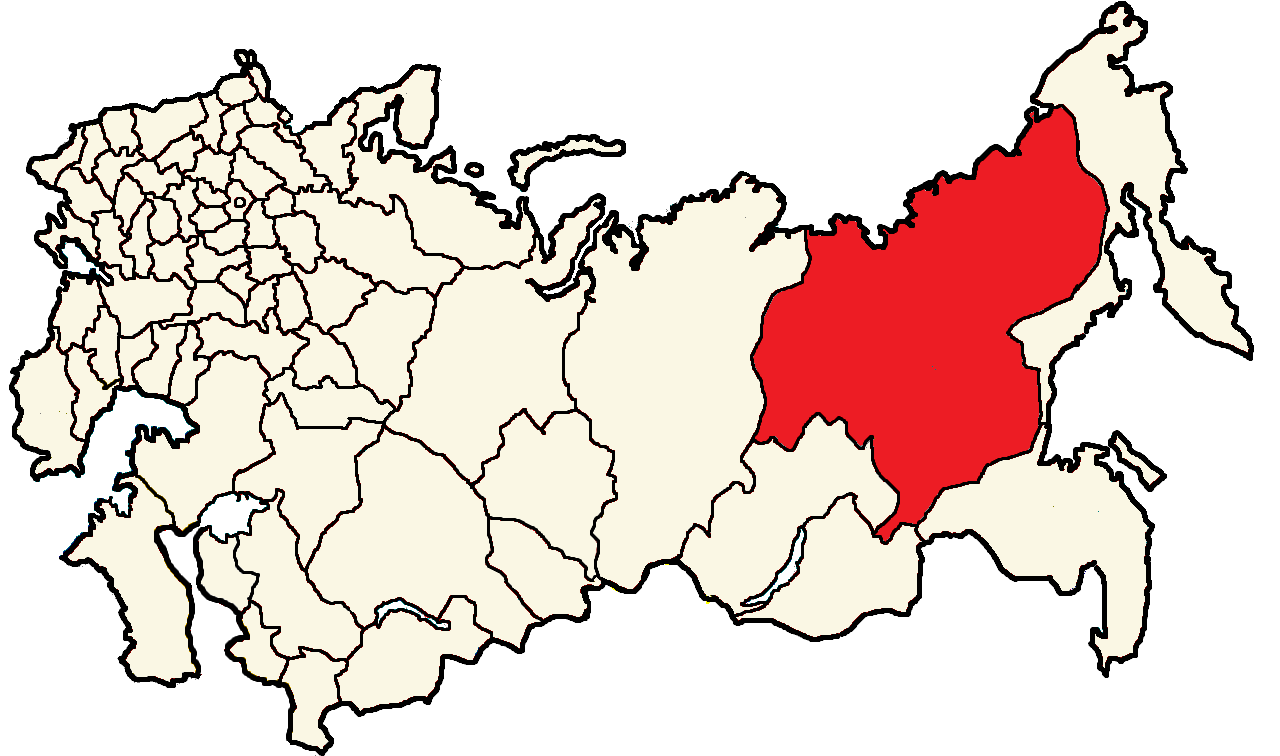

The electoral district covered the Yakutsk Oblast. An election was held and deputies elected, but Radkey was unable to trace the any voting figures.

Yakutsk
Party	Vote	%	Seats
List 1 - Yakutian Labour Union of Federalists	1,541	43.02	1
List 2 - Socialist-Revolutionaries	1,208	33.72	1
List 4 - Kadets	586	16.36	
List 3 - Mensheviks	247	6.90	
Total:	3,582		2

Deputies Elected
Xenophonov	Federal Labour Union
Pankratov	SR

==== Kamchatka ====
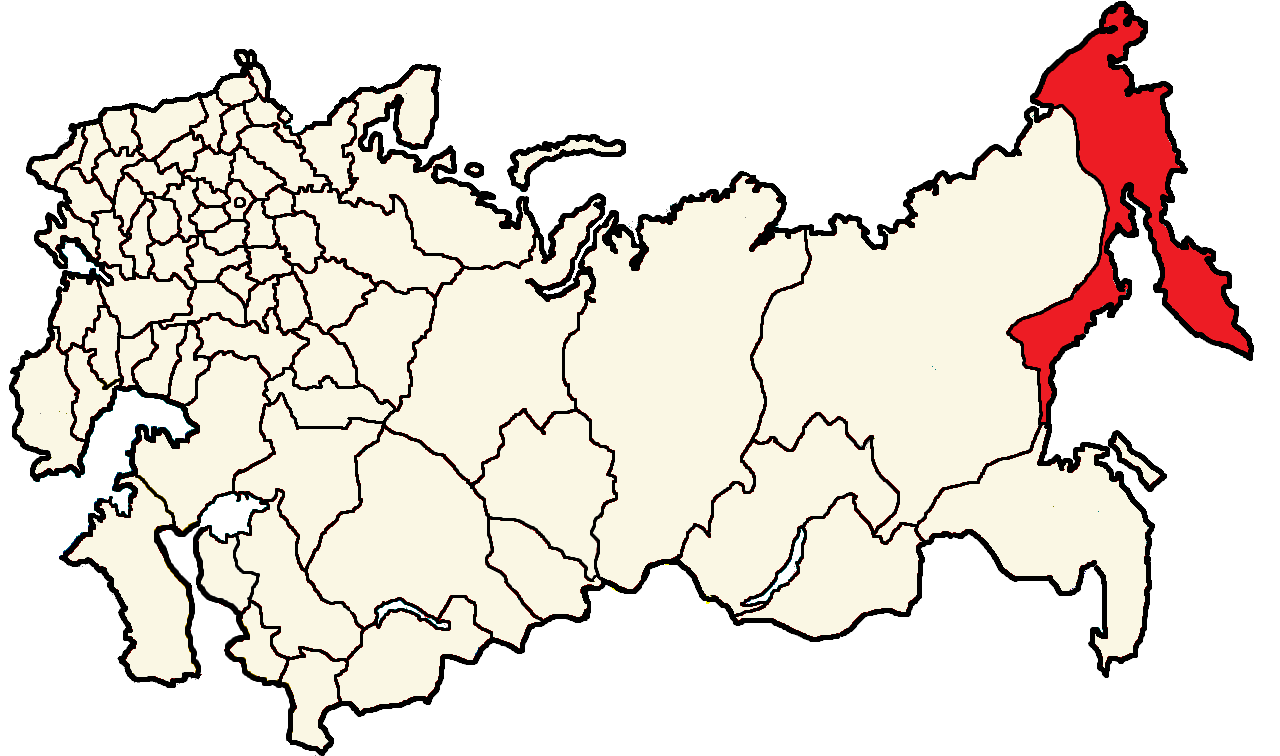

The electoral district covered the Kamchatka Oblast. The vote was held in the Kamchatka electoral on October 29, 1917, well ahead of the rest of the country, in order to allow its sole deputy to be able to catch the last steamship to Petrograd to attend the opening of the Constituent Assembly. Radkey claims to only have been able to trace results from the town of Zavoyko, but the Zavoyko poll was disqualified as the vote had been held one day in advance. 275 people had voted in Zavoyko, 258 of them for SR, 9 for Social Democrats and 8 for others.

Deputies Elected
Lavrov	SR

=== Turkestan ===
==== Horde ====
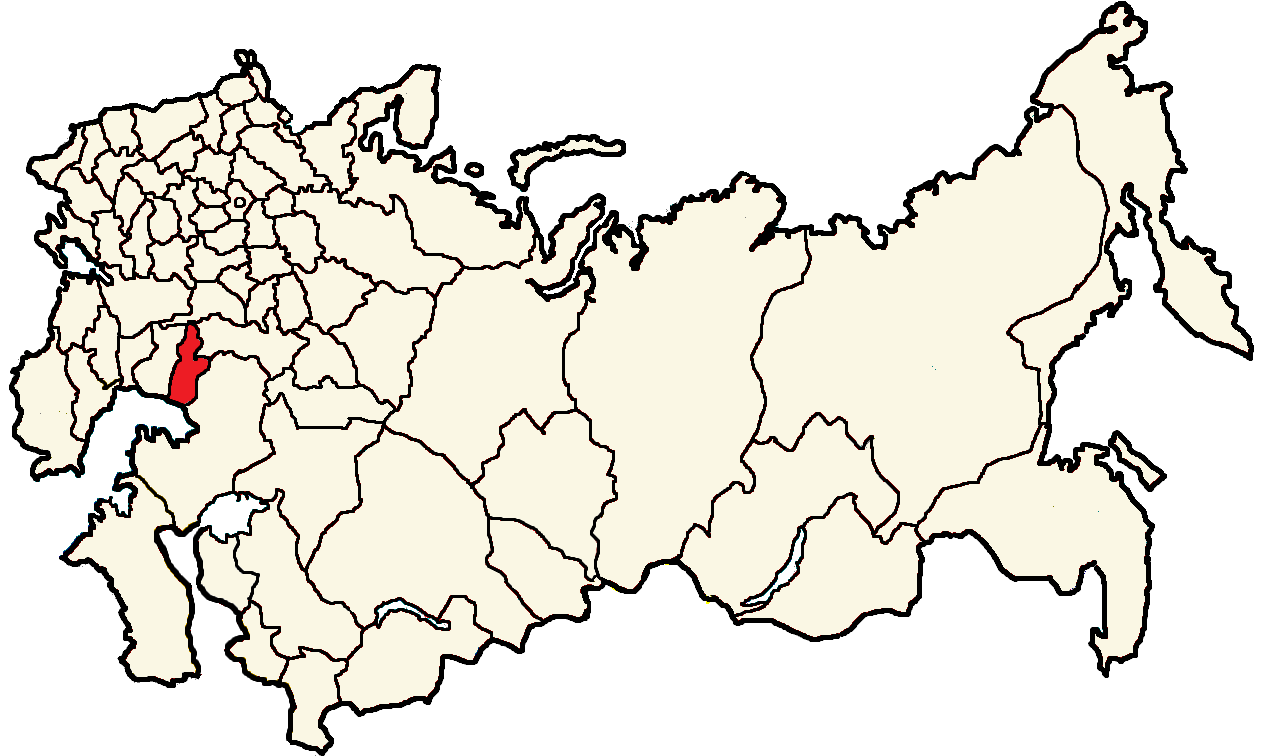

The Horde (or 'Orda') electoral district covered the areas of the Bukey Horde in the Transvolga. Khanskaya Stavka was the administrative center of the electoral district. According to Radkey, two lists had registered in the Horde electoral district. As per Radkey's account, there was no information on whether election had been held. As per Wade (2004), members of the local revolutionary committee began arresting the District Election Commission officials as the vote tallying was ongoing.

Deputies Elected
Kulmanov	Alash
Tanachev	Alash

==== Uralsk ====
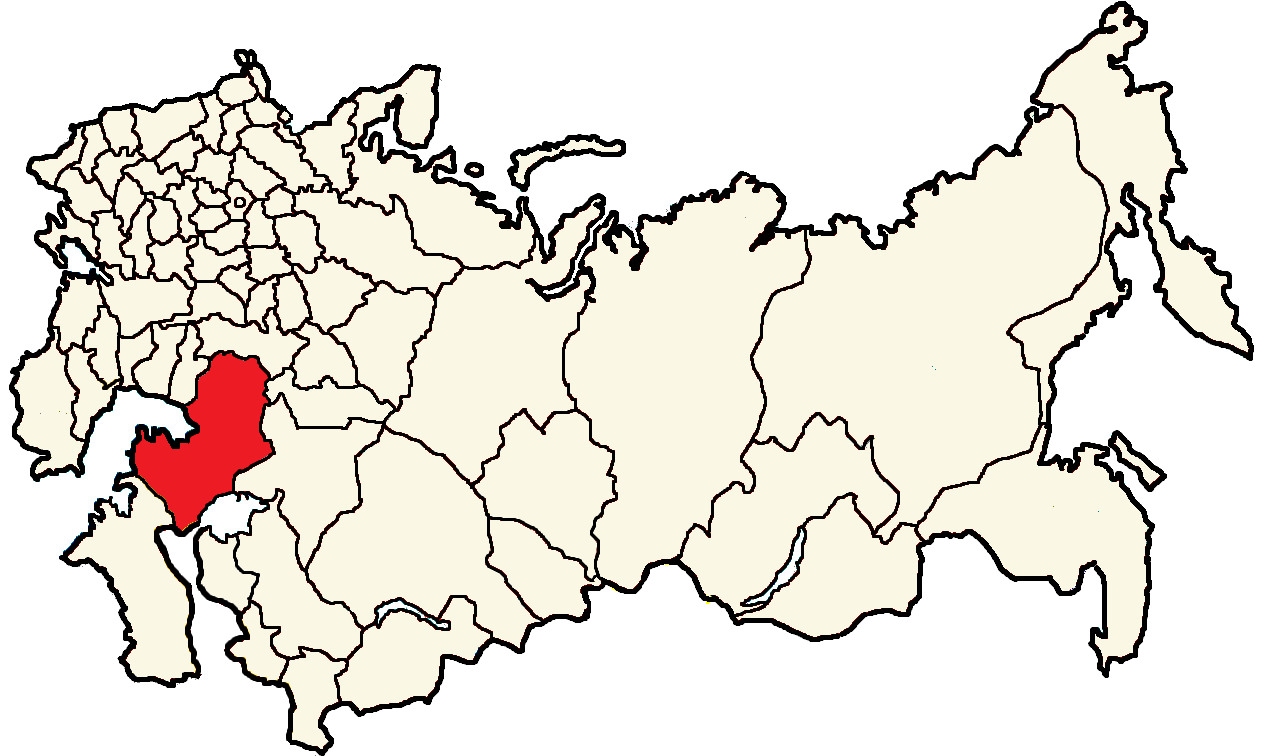

The electoral district covered the Ural Oblast as well as the Mangyshlak uezd of the Transcaspian Oblast (except for areas inhabited by Turkmens).

Uralsk
Party	Vote	%
List 1 - Ural Regional Kirghiz Committee	278,014	75.01
List 3 - Military Committee of the Ural Cossack Host	61,476	16.59
List 4 - Soviet of Peasants and Non-Resident Deputies	26,059	7.03
List 2 - Socialist-Revolutionaries	5,076	1.37
Total:	370,625	

Deputies Elected
Alibekov	Ural Regional Kirghiz Committee
Dosmukhamedov, J. D.	Ural Regional Kirghiz Committee
Dosmukhamedov, K. D.	Ural Regional Kirghiz Committee
Ipmagambetov	Ural Regional Kirghiz Committee
Karatlev	Ural Regional Kirghiz Committee
Borodin	Cossack

==== Turgai ====
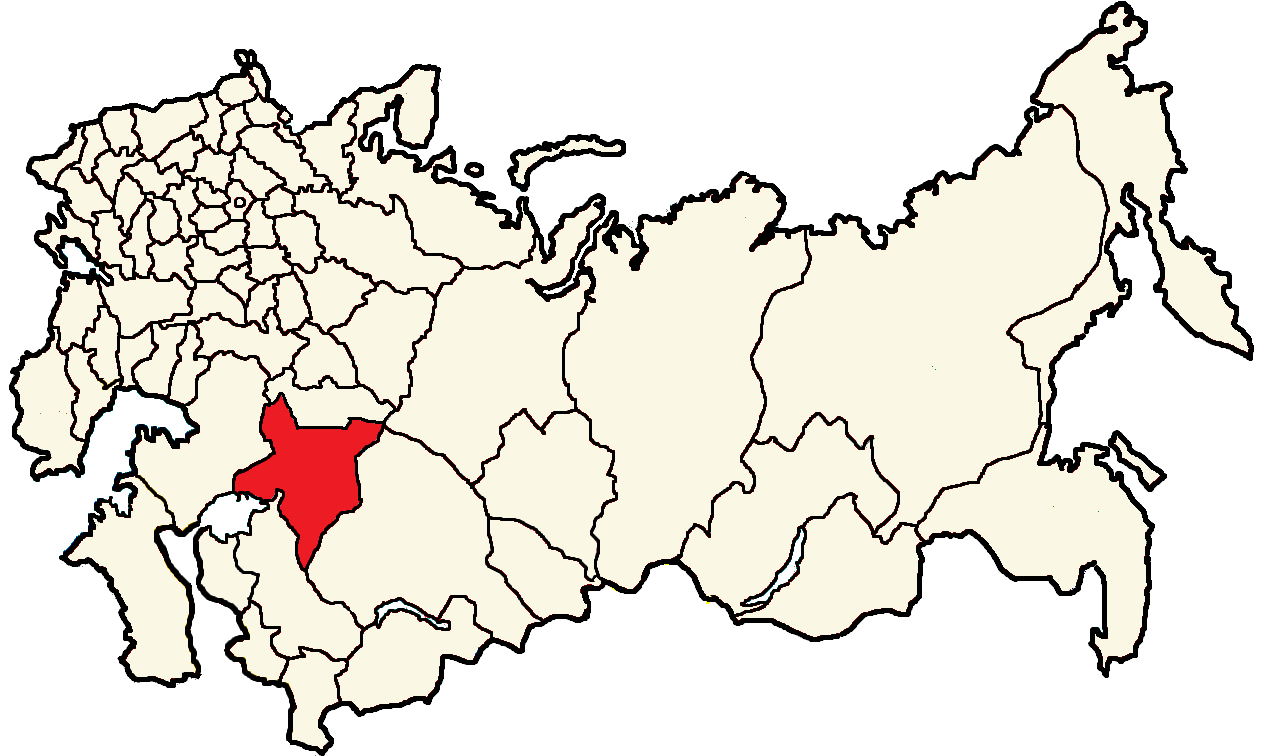

The electoral district covered the Turgai Oblast. According to Radkey the vote was held in one uezd, but that the result was not known. Nevertheless, Soviet sources indicate voting took place across the district. Soviet historian L. M. Spirin (whose data is used for the results table below) lists 281,782 votes cast for three different candidate lists. Notably, Radkey rejects these results as unreliable.

Deputies Elected
Baitursynov	Alash
Berimzhanov	Alash
Doshchanov	Alash
Temirov	Alash
Pakhomov	SR

Turgai
Party	Vote	%
List 1 - Kirghiz Alash Party	211,274	74.98
List 2 - Socialist-Revolutionaries and Congress of Peasants, Soldiers and Workers Deputies	63,750	22.62
List 3 - Mensheviks	6,758	2.40
Total:	281,782	

==== Transcaspian ====
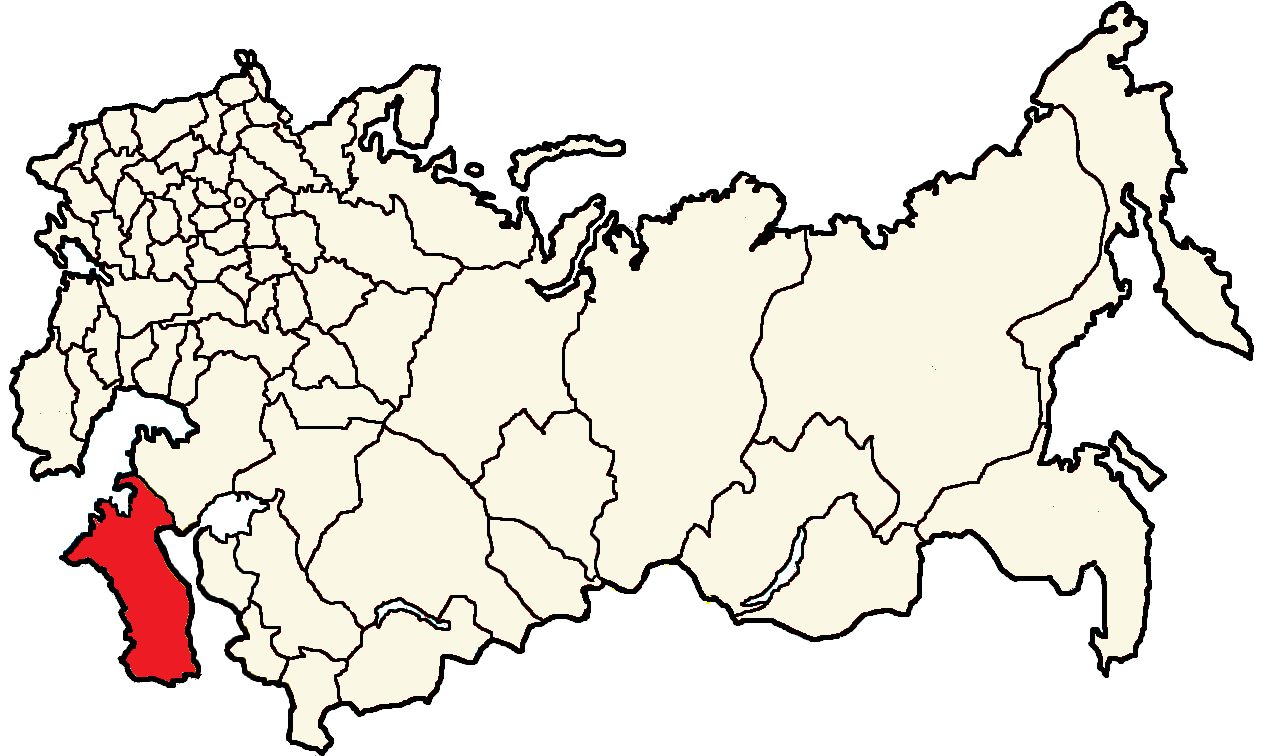

The electoral district covered the Transcaspian Oblast, except for most of the Mangyshlak uezd (only the volosts inhabited by Turkmens remained part of the Transcaspian electoral district). The Transcaspian electoral district was assigned 2 seats in the Constituent Assembly. According to Radkey, an election was held but results not known. Per Wade (2004), it is certain that no election took place in the Transcaspian electoral district.

==== Samarkand ====
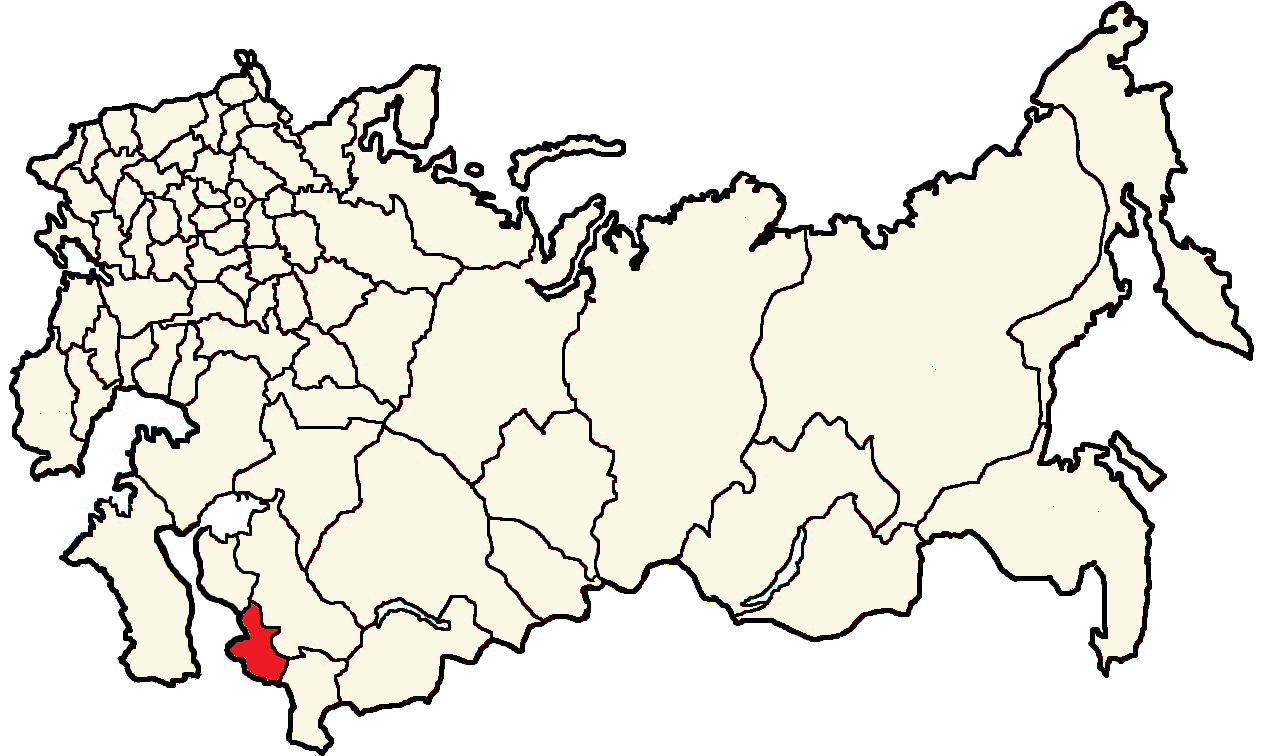

The electoral district covered the Samarkand Oblast. Samarkand was assigned 5 seats. According to Radkey, an election was held but results were not known to him.

Deputies Elected
Abdukhalilov	Muslim organizations of the Samarkand region
Behbudiy	Muslim organizations of the Samarkand region
Farhatov	Muslim organizations of the Samarkand region
Maksudi	Muslim organizations of the Samarkand region

Samarkand
Party	Vote	%
List 2 - Muslim Organizations of Samarkand Oblast	87,059	91.84
List 1 - Socialist-Revolutionaries	4,238	4.47
List 4 - United Oblast Progressive Bloc	1,913	2.02
List 3 - Mensheviks	1,586	1.67
Total:	94,796	

==== Amu Darya ====
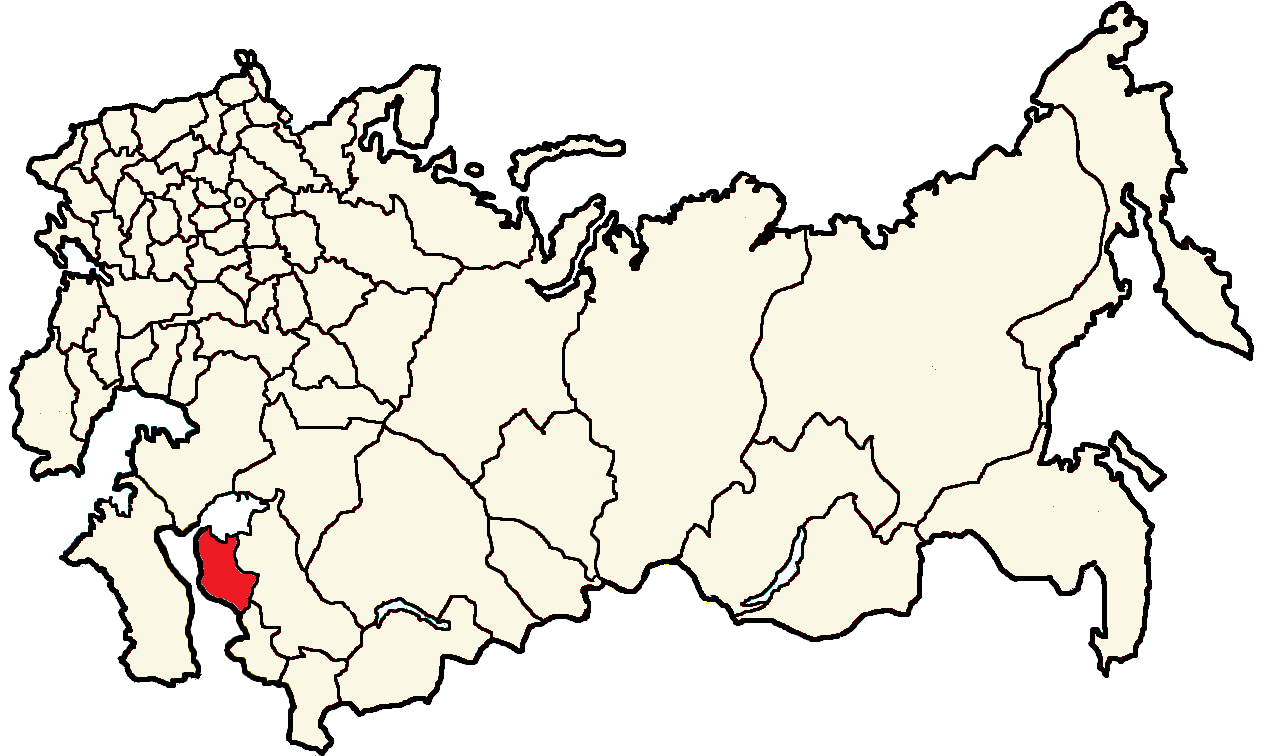

The electoral district covered the Amu Darya Division of the Syr-Darya Oblast. According to Radkey, it is not known whether voting took place. One seat had been allotted to Amu Darya. Per Wade (2004), it is certain that no election took place in Amu Darya.

==== Syr Darya ====
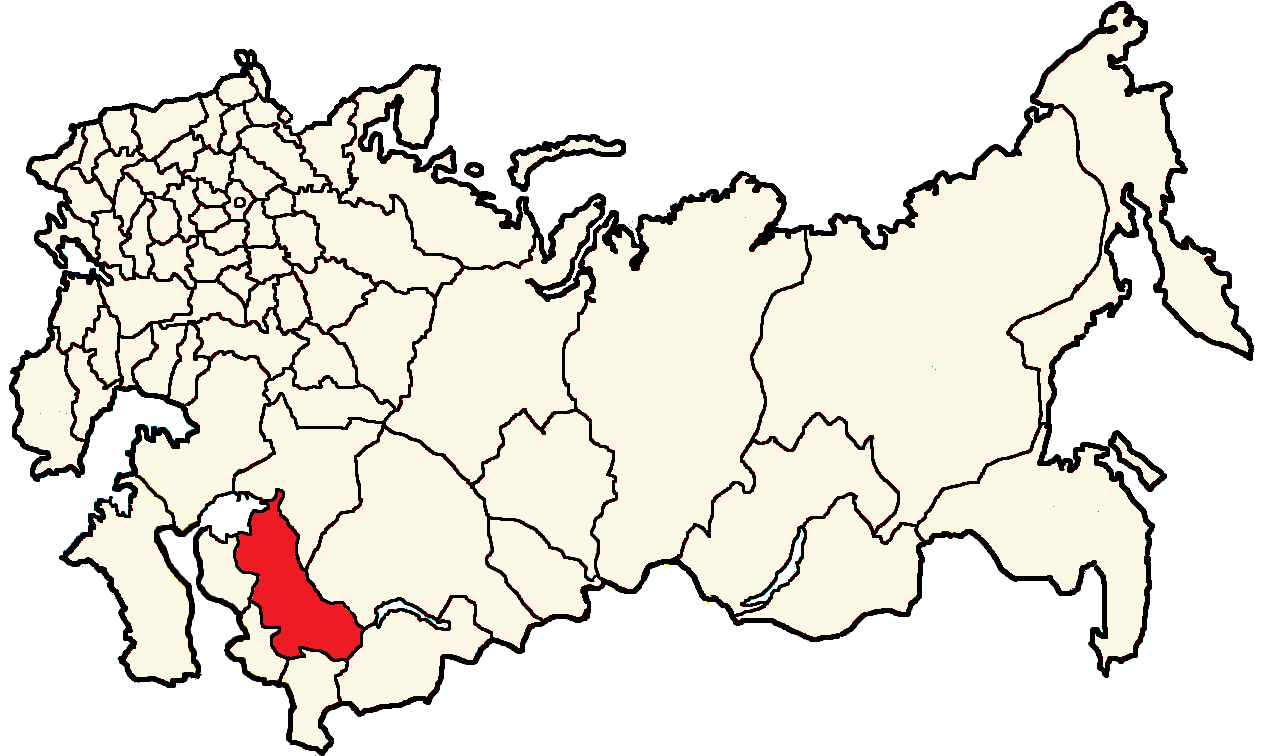

The electoral district covered the Syr-Darya Oblast, except for the Amu Darya Division. Voting in Syr Darya was postponed until mid-Dec 1917, then to January 19, 1918. In the end no vote ever took place. Nine seats had been allotted to Syr Darya.

==== Fergana ====
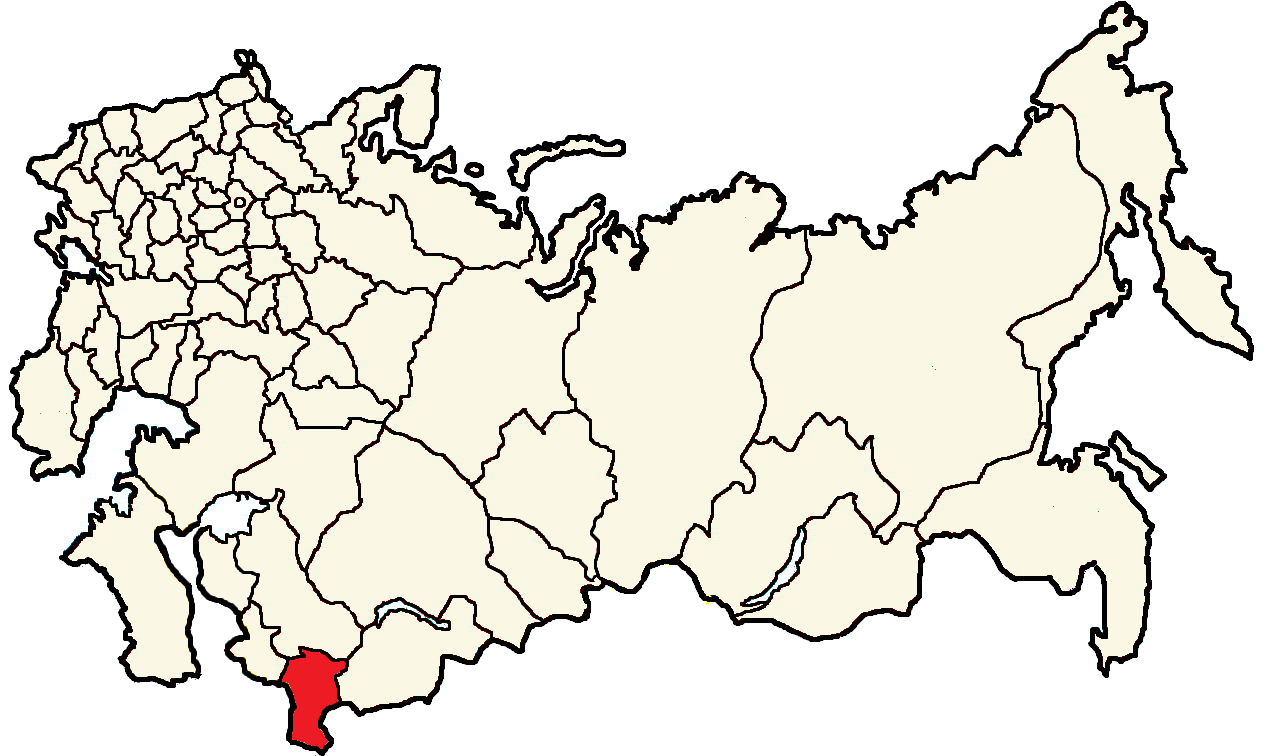

The electoral district covered the Fergana Oblast. An election was held and deputies elected, but Radkey was unable to trace the any voting figures. Seemingly, per Soviet sources cited by Radkey, there were 5 deputies elected from Fergana, out of whom 1 SR.

Deputies Elected
Khodzhaev	Muinil Islam Society
Tyuryayev	Muinil Islam Society
Akaev	All-Fergana List of Muslim Organizations
Chaykin	All-Fergana List of Muslim Organizations
Shokay	All-Fergana List of Muslim Organizations
Mirza-Akhmedov	All-Fergana List of Muslim Organizations
Shagiakhmetov	All-Fergana List of Muslim Organizations
Shashahmedov	All-Fergana List of Muslim Organizations
Urazaev	All-Fergana List of Muslim Organizations
Yuldash-Kariev	All-Fergana List of Muslim Organizations
Yurgul-Agayev	All-Fergana List of Muslim Organizations

The results in the table below are based on data from Soviet historian L. M. Spirin. U.S. historian Oliver Henry Radkey rejected these results as unreliable.

Fergana
Party	Vote	%
List 1 - Muinil Islam Society	76,849	49.86
List 2 - All Fergana List of Soviet of Deputies of Muslim Organizations	77,282	50.14
Total:	154,131	

==== Semirechie ====
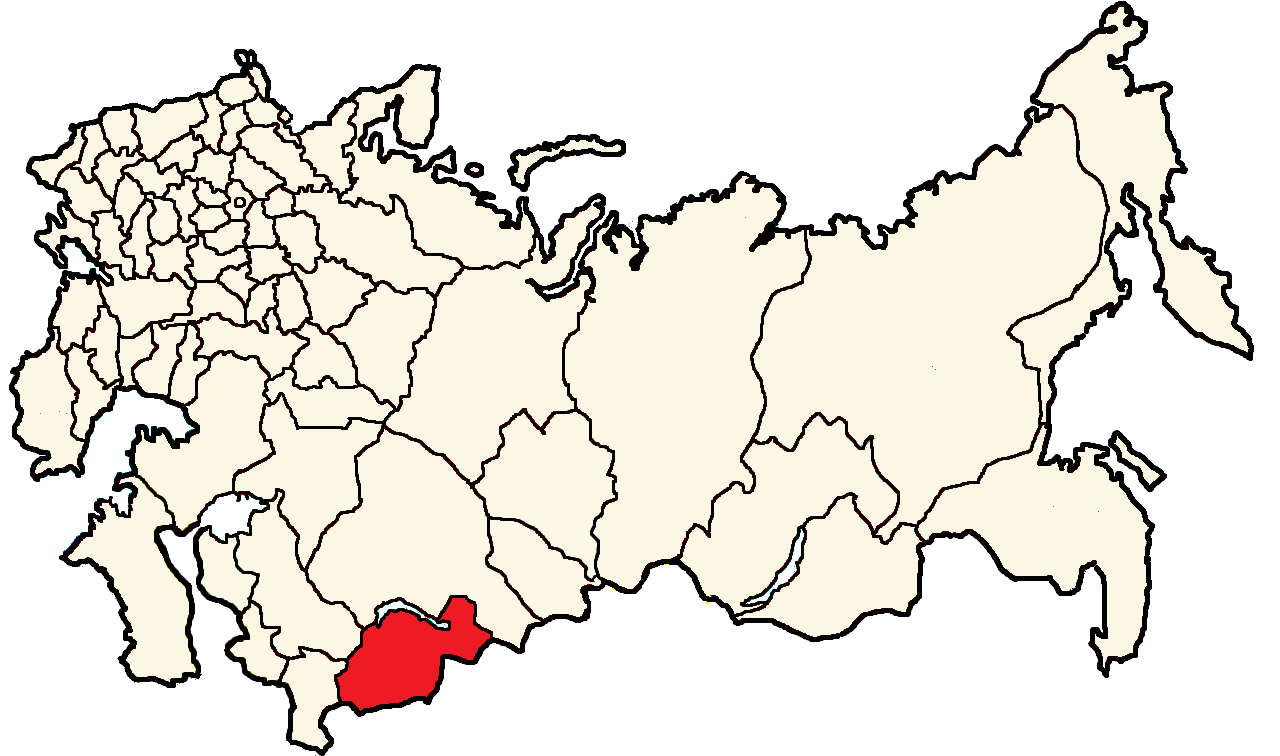

The electoral district covered the Semirechie Oblast. The electoral battle in Semirechie stood between a general soviet list (SRs and Mensheviks) and the Kirgiz-Cossack alliance. The Bolshevik list had been banned.

Semirechie
Party	Vote	%
List 3 - Bloc of the Kirghiz Party Alash and other Muslims (Alash-Semirechie Cossack Host)	219,832	52.85
List 2 - Bloc of Socialists of Verny Town, Soviet of Peasants Deputies, Soviet of Soldiers and Workers Deputies, Kirghiz Socialist Party "Fukhara" (Socialist-Revolutionaries, Mensheviks)	167,793	40.34
List 1 - Tarachin Population of Dzharkent Uezd (Uighur-Dungan alliance)	28,368	6.82
Total:	415,993	

Deputies Elected
Shebalin	Socialist Bloc
Tynyshpaev	Socialist Bloc
Amanzholov	Alash-Cossack alliance
Jainakov	Alash-Cossack alliance
Saurambaev	Alash-Cossack alliance
Shendrikov	Alash-Cossack alliance

=== Military districts ===
==== Baltic Fleet ====
The electoral district covered the military forces and employees and workers at bases under the command of the Baltic Fleet. The Baltic Fleet was a revolutionary bastion. Electoral participation stood at around 70%. 76% of sailors voted, but the sailors were outnumbered by workers and soldiers at the naval bases. Baltic Fleet used a separate electoral system, where the voter could vote for two individual candidates rather than fixed party lists.

The election campaign received plenty attention in the fleet newspapers. The campaign of non-Bolshevik candidates was largely confined to Helsingfors. The outcome of the vote indicated strong dissatisfaction with the performance of the Provisional Government, as the combined Bolshevik/Left SR vote stood at around 85% (the highest of all electoral constituencies nationwide). Radkey claims Dybenko was the most voted Bolshevik candidate, placing Lenin second. Dybenko was himself a sailor, and likewise in the case of the SRs sailor candidates Shisko and Maslov scored higher votes than non-sailor political leaders.

Saul (1978) expresses strong concerns over the accuracy of the result presented by Radkey. Saul (1978) reports the following result from the Helsingfors region of the Baltic Fleet electoral district (with results from 97 out of 100 electoral precincts); 22,670 votes for Dybenko, 22,237 votes for Lenin, 13,617 votes for Shishko, 12,906 votes for Proshian, 7,620 votes for Maslov, 7,351 votes for Tsion, 855 votes for Demchinsky and 838 votes for Rengarten. According to Soviet sources the non-partisan group got one percent of the votes in Helsingfors. In Kronstadt an 84% vote for the Bolsheviks was recorded. On the battleships the Bolsheviks won some 70% of the vote, whilst the (left) SRs dominated the vote in the Åbo–Åland region (which had smaller ships).

Baltic Fleet
Party	Vote	%	Seats
List 2 - Bolsheviks	65,093	57.70	2
List 1 - Socialist-Revolutionaries	30,510	27.04	
List 4 - Right-wing Socialist-Revolutionaries	13,249	11.74	
List 3 - List without title (Officers' Union)	2,018	1.79	
List 5 - Non-Partisan Group	1,948	1.73	
Total:	112,818		2

Deputies Elected
Dybenko	Bolshevik
Lenin	Bolshevik

==== Black Sea Fleet ====
The electoral district covered the military forces and employees and workers at bases under the command of the Black Sea Fleet.

Black Sea Fleet
Party	Vote	%	Seats
List 6 - Socialist-Revolutionaries	22,251	42.28	1
List 1 - Ukrainian Socialist-Revolutionaries	12,895	24.50	
List 5 - Bolsheviks	10,771	20.47	
List 2 - Baltic Sea Tsentroflot and the Sevastopol Branch of the Union of Sailors	4,769	9.06	
List 4 - Mensheviks	1,943	3.69	
List 3	?		
Total:	52,629		1

Deputies Elected
Bunakov-Fondaminsky	SR

==== Northern Front ====
The constituency covered the Northern Front of the Russian Army. And apart from the Northern Front itself, the electoral district also included the Russian troops stationed in Finland (except those under the Baltic Fleet command) as well as the Lake Peipus Flotilla. Voter turnout stood at 72.36482% per official records.

Northern Front
Party	Vote	%
List 5 - Bolsheviks	471,828	56.13
List 3 - Socialist-Revolutionaries and Peasants' Deputies	249,832	29.72
List 4 - Ukrainian Socialist-Revolutionaries and the Muslim National Socialist Organization	88,956	10.58
List 7 - Kadets	13,687	1.63
List 1 - Mensheviks	5,966	0.71
List 2 - Popular Socialists	5,868	0.70
List 6 - Menshevik-Internationalists (Novayazhiznists)	4,454	0.53
Total:	840,591	

Deputies Elected
Ivanov	SR
Kolerov	SR
Likhach	SR
Rabinovich	SR
Utgof	SR
Klochok	Ukrainian-Muslim List
Antonov-Ovseyenko	Bolshevik
Medvedev	Bolshevik
Nakhimson	Bolshevik
Podvoisky	Bolshevik
Sedyakin	Bolshevik
Sheiman	Bolshevik
Sklyansky	Bolshevik
Smilga	Bolshevik
Stučka	Bolshevik
Vasiliev	Bolshevik

==== Western Front ====
The electoral district covered the Western Front of the Russian Army. The result for Muslim Socialists stems from a newspaper report in Russkiye Vedomosti, which had data from 472 out of 602 voting centres.

Western Front
Party	Vote	%
List 9 - Bolsheviks	653,430	66.95
List 12 - Socialist-Revolutionaries and the Soviet of Peasants Deputies of the Armies of the Western Front	180,582	18.50
List 1 - Ukrainian SRs and Ukrainian Social Democratic Labour Party	85,062	8.72
List 2 - Muslim Socialists	16,846	1.73
List 3 - Kadets	16,750	1.72
List 5 - Mensheviks-Bund	5,622	0.58
List 4 - Belorussian Socialist Party (Gromada) and the Congress of Belorussian Soldiers of the Western Front	4,380	0.45
List 6 - Russian Democratic Party	3,055	0.31
List 10 - Bloc of Popular Socialists, Unity and right-wing SRs (based around the Volya Naroda newspaper)	2,840	0.29
List 7	?	
List 8	?	
List 11	?	
Unaccounted	7,433	0.76
Total:	976,000	

Deputies Elected
Bazyak	Ukrainian Bloc
Lebedinets	Ukrainian Bloc
Morgenstiern	SR
Nikolayev	SR
Zetel-Zusman	SR
Anuchin	Bolshevik
Apeter	Bolshevik
Fedenev	Bolshevik
Ksenofontov	Bolshevik
Kukonkov	Bolshevik
Lysyakov	Bolshevik
Miasnikian	Bolshevik
Rogozinsky	Bolshevik
Grzelszczak	Bolshevik
Tikhmenev	Bolshevik
Vasiliev	Bolshevik
Yakovlev	Bolshevik

==== South-Western Front ====
The electoral district covered the South-Western Front of the Russian Army.

South-Western Front
Party	Vote	%
List 1 - Socialist-Revolutionaries and Soviet of Peasants Deputies of the South-Western Front	402,930	40.00
List 4 - Bolsheviks	292,626	29.05
List 3 - Ukrainian Socialist-Revolutionaries, Ukrainian Soc.-Dem. Labour Party and Socialist-Cossacks	168,354	16.71
List 2 - Mensheviks	79,630	7.90
List 6 - Socialist Group of Muslim Soldiers of the South-Western Front	32,910	3.27
List 7 - Kadets; List 10 - Kadets and Allies	13,724	1.36
List 9 - Popular Socialists	3,084	0.31
List 5 - Unity and Non-Partisans, United by the Desire to Save the Motherland	?	
List 8 - Congress of the Delegates of Polish Servicemen	?	
Unaccounted	14,165	1.41
Total:	1,007,423	

Deputies Elected
Dansky	SR
Detlaf	SR
Dikansky	SR
Filippovsky	SR
Levenberg	SR
Lishchev	SR
Moiseenko	SR
Nikotin	SR
Sokoloff	SR
Surgutchev	SR
Troyanovsky	Menshevik
Bereznyak	Ukrainian SR
Dolgov	Ukrainian SR
Kutsyak	Ukrainian SR
Chudnovsky	Bolshevik
Kokovikhin	Bolshevik
Lashevich	Bolshevik
Marchenkov	Bolshevik
Pyatakov	Bolshevik
Rozmirovich	Bolshevik
Trubachev	Bolshevik

==== Romanian Front ====
The electoral district covered the Romanian Front of the Russian Army. Moreover, the constituency covered the Danube Flotilla. To Radkey some 12,000-15,000 votes appeared to be missing from official records.

Romanian Front
Party	Vote	%
List 3 - Socialist-Revolutionaries and Soviet of Peasants Deputies	666,438	59.05
List 1 - United Ukrainian Socialists	186,219	16.50
List 6 - Bolsheviks	173,804	15.40
List 4 - Mensheviks	36,115	3.20
List 2 - Muslim Socialists	23,136	2.05
List 7 - Kadets	21,443	1.90
List 5 - Popular Socialists	4,514	0.40
List 9 -Lettish Soldiers	3,386	0.30
List 8 - Moldovan SRs	?	
Unaccounted	13,545	1.20
Total:	1,128,600	

Deputies Elected
Grischenko	Ukrainian Socialist Bloc
Petliura	Ukrainian Socialist Bloc
Pisnachevsky	Ukrainian Socialist Bloc
Ternichenko	Ukrainian Socialist Bloc
Abramov	SR
Alekseevsky	SR
Andrianov	SR
Bocharnikov	SR
Bylinkin	SR
Erofeev	SR
Ilinskiy	SR
Kotlin	SR
Krakovetsky	SR
Lordkipanidze	SR
Markov	SR
Shmelyov	SR
Krylenko	Bolshevik
Mostovenko	Bolshevik
Ryazanov	Bolshevik
Solers	Bolshevik

==== Caucasian Front ====
The electoral district covered the Caucasian Front of the Russian Army. Moreover, it included the Urmia-Van Flotilla.

Spirin's account of the election result only gives a rough estimate, with 360,000 votes for the Socialist-Revolutionaries and 60,000 votes for the Bolsheviks. The account of Radkey only includes votes from Erzerum fortress, with 16,824 votes. However, the Ukrainian vote in Erzerum was missing in the source material available to Radkey.

Caucasian Front: Erzerum Fortress
Party	Vote	%
Socialist-Revolutionaries	6,537	38.86
Bolsheviks	6,211	36.92
Armenian Revolutionary Federation	1,948	11.58
Mensheviks	1,113	6.62
Kadets	357	2.12
Georgians	51	0.30
Unaccounted	607	3.61
Total:	16,824	

Deputies Elected
Berezov	SR
Donskoy	SR
Mikhailov	SR
Pyzhev	SR
Tumanov	SR
Badaev	Bolshevik

==== Russian forces in France and the Balkans ====
The Russian Expeditionary Force in France and the Salonika front formed an electoral district of its own, with some 50,000 eligible voters. According to Wade (2004) it is unclear whether any election took place in the electoral district.
