= Pavel Lebedev-Polianskii =

Soviet literary scholar and academic

- Па́вел Ле́бедев-Поля́нский
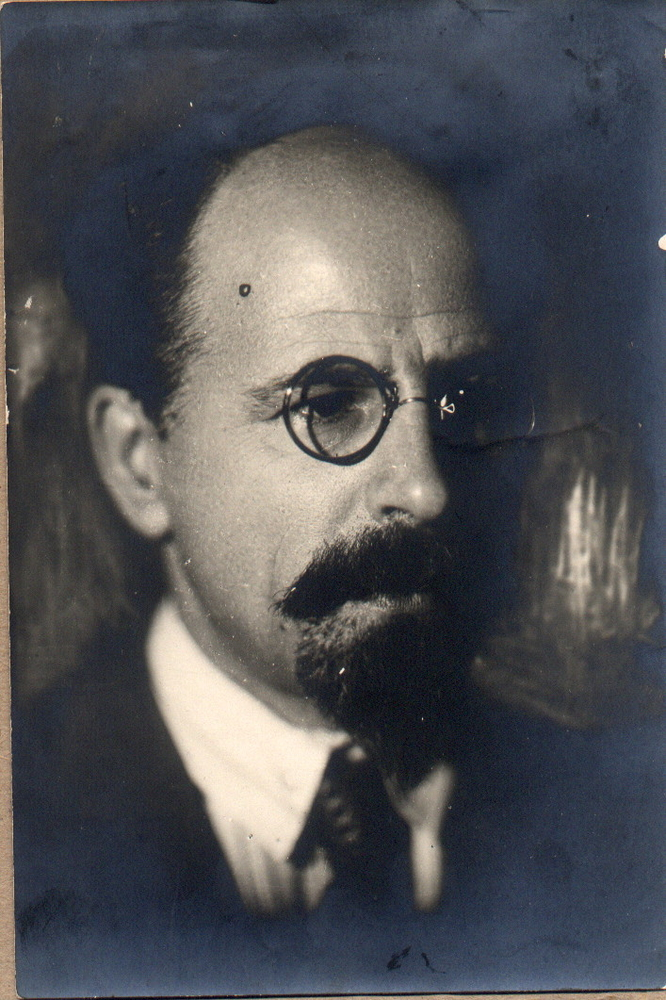
- Born: Pavel Ivanovich Lebedev; 6 December 1881; Melenki, Vladimir Oblast, Russian Empire
- Died: 4 April 1948 (aged 66); Moscow, Russian Soviet Federative Socialist Republic
- Title: Professor; Academician of the Academy of Sciences of the Soviet Union
- Spouse: Vera Lebedeva
- Awards: Order of Lenin

Academic background
- Education: Imperial Yuriev University

Academic work
- Discipline: Literary science and literary criticism
- Institutions: Moscow State University; Academy of Sciences of the Soviet Union
- Main interests: Marxist literary criticism

Pavel Ivanovich Lebedev-Polianskii (Russian: Па́вел Ива́нович Ле́бедев-Поля́нский; 21 December 1881 – 4 April 1948) was a Russian revolutionary and later a prominent Soviet state functionary, literary scholar and academic.

== Biography ==
Born Pavel Ivanovich Lebedev in Melenki, Vladimir Oblast, he became active in the Russian Social Democratic Labour Party in 1902. In 1908, he eloped with Vera Lebedeva and then went into exile in Geneva, where they stayed until returning to Russia in 1917. In 1914, he reconstituted Vpered, arguing that the reason so many European socialists supported the First World War indicated that socialist ideology was weak — something which could be addressed by scientific and socialist education. He also used the pseudonym Valerian Polianskii.

He joined the Bolsheviks in August 1917, and after the October Revolution, he participated in the liquidation of the Holy Synod and the Academic Council which were under the Ministry of Public Education.

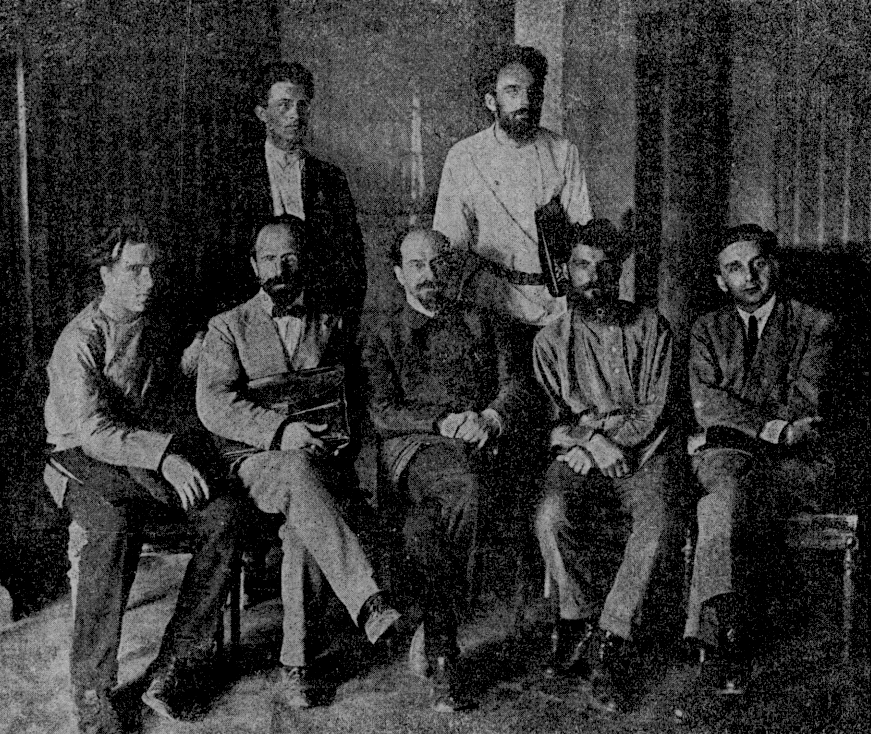
A group of members of the International Bureau of Proletkult. Sitting (left to right): War Van Overstraeten, Pavel Lebedev-Polianskii (secretary), Anatoly Lunacharsky (chairman), Nicola Bombacci, Wilhelm Herzog, Standing Walther Bringolf, Jules Humbert-Droz

From 1917 to 1919, Lebedev-Polianskii was commissar of the Main Administration of Literature and Publishing Department of the People's Commissariat for Education, where he organised new editions of works of classic Russian literature. From 1918 to 1920, he was chairman of the All-Russian Council of Proletkult during which time he edited Proletarskaya Kul'tura with Fedor Kalinin.

In 1921, he became the director of the Glavlit, a post he held until 1930. From 1928 to 1930, he edited Literatura i marksizm (Literature and Marxism). He was also a member of the editorial board of the first edition of the Great Soviet Encyclopedia.

From 1934 to 1939, he edited Literaturnaia entsiklopediia (Literary Encyclopedia).

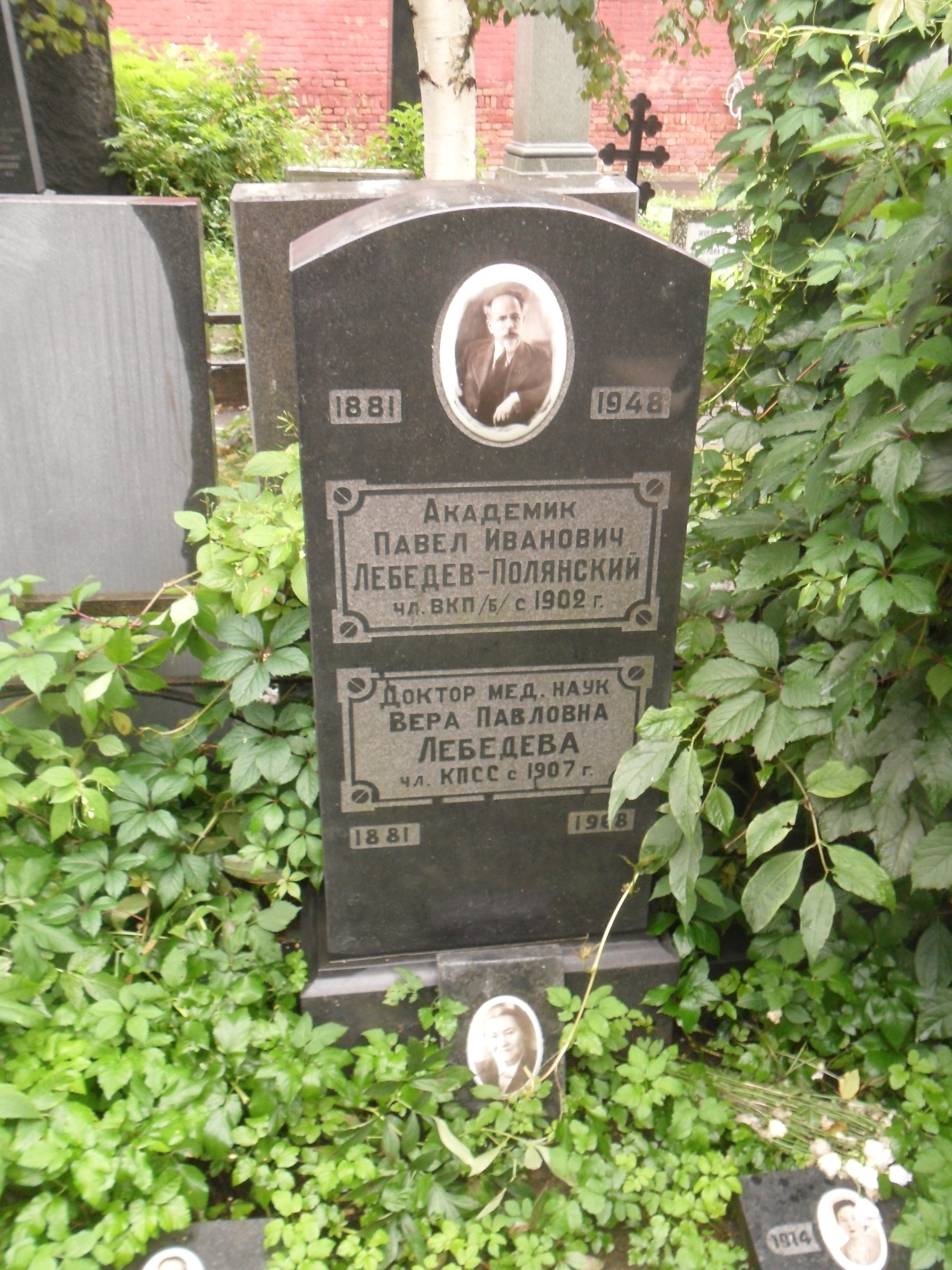
Grave of Pavel Lebedev-Polianskii at the Novodevichy Cemetery

From 1937 until his death in 1948, Lebedev-Polianskii was the director of the Institute of Russian Literature (Pushkin House) of the Academy of Sciences. He led campaigns to erase non-Marxist literary studies and linguistics in the USSR and to establish the principle of partisanship in Soviet science and ideology.

He was awarded the Order of Lenin in 1945.

== Works ==
He published a number of books:

- Lenin and Literature, (1924)
- Three Great Russian Democrats, (1938)
