= Tver electoral district =

Constituency of the Russian Republic

Tver
- Former Civilian constituency for the All-Russian Constituent Assembly
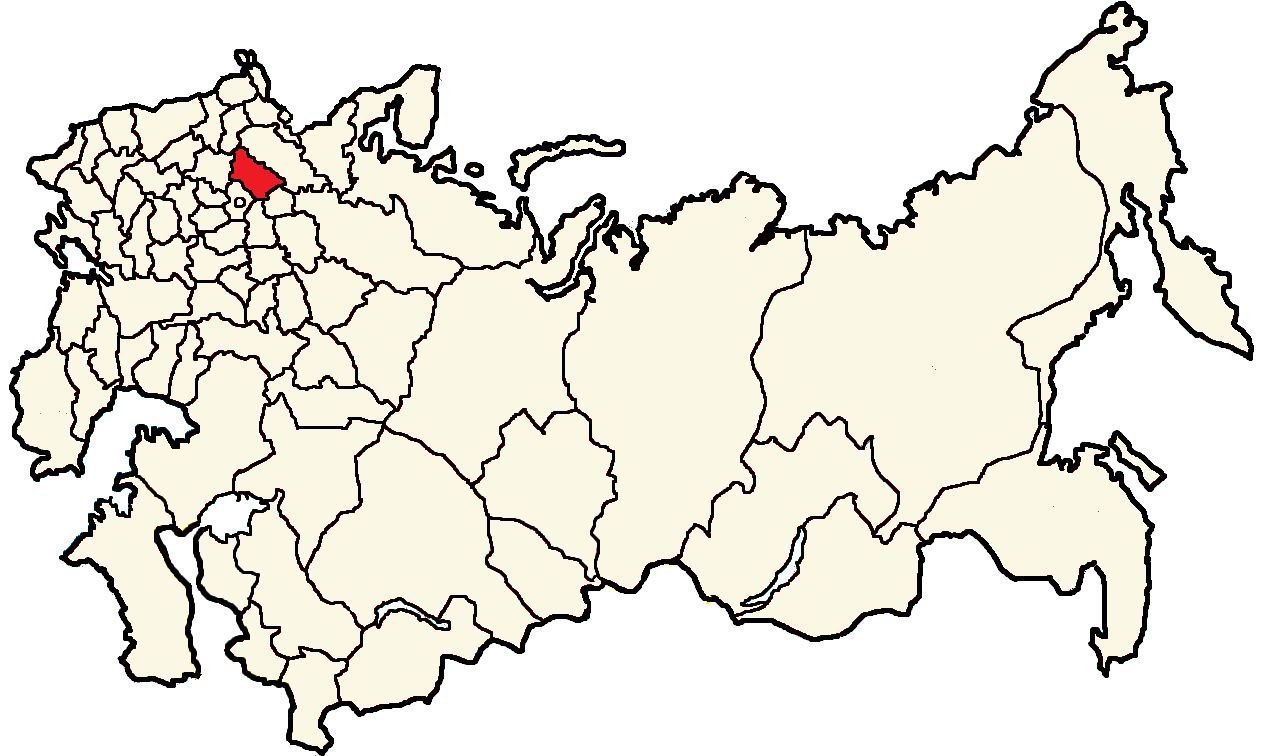

Former constituency
- Created: 1917
- Abolished: 1918
- Number of members: 9
- Number of Uyezd Electoral Commissions: 12
- Number of Urban Electoral Commissions: 1
- Number of Parishes: 246

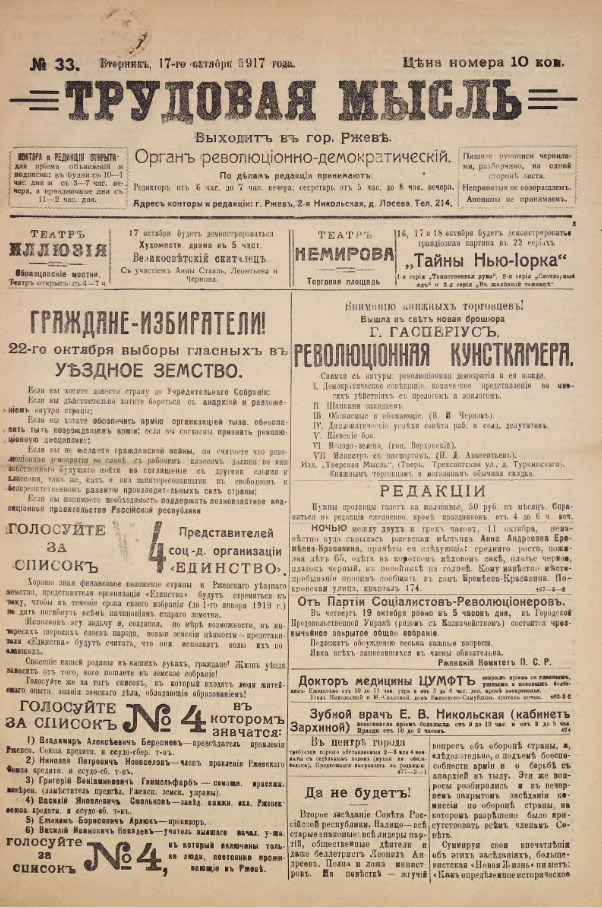
Cover page of Rzhev newspaper Trudovaya Mysl, carrying electoral propaganda for List 4

The Tver electoral district (Russian: Тверский избирательный округ) was a constituency created for the 1917 Russian Constituent Assembly election.

The electoral district covered the Tver Governorate. U.S. historian Oliver Henry Radkey, who is the source for the results table below, lists the Tver result as 'somewhat incomplete'. Russkoe Slovo reported that the election was conducted orderly, whilst the SR organ Delo Naroda stated that Bolsheviks disrupted the polls in Rzhev uezd. A farmer candidate list was denied registration to contest the election in Tver.

== Results ==
Tver
Party	Vote	%	Seats
List 6 - Bolsheviks	362,687	59.27	6
List 3 - Socialist-Revolutionaries and Soviet of Peasants Deputies	186,030	30.40	3
List 1 - Kadets	32,830	5.37	
List 5 - Mensheviks	22,552	3.69	
List 2 - Union of Landowners	3,677	0.60	
List 7 - Popular Socialists	2,338	0.38	
List 4 - Unity and Union of Credit and Savings Associations	975	0.16	
List 8 - Commercial-Industrial Union	812	0.13	
Total:	611,901		9

Deputies Elected
Tikhomirov	SR
Tolmachevsky	SR
Volsky	SR
Arosev	Bolshevik
Bulatov	Bolsheviks
Medov	Bolshevik
Schmidt	Bolshevik
Sokolnikov	Bolshevik
Vagzhanov	Bolshevik
