= Virgil Shantser =

Bolshevik revolutionary

Virgil Leonovich Shantser (Russian: Вирги́лий Лео́нович Ша́нцер; 21 September 1867 — 29 November 1911) (pseudonym – Marat) was a Bolshevik revolutionary active in the Moscow uprising of 1905. He became a leading Bolshevik, but followed Alexander Bogdanov into the Vpered faction in 1909. However he contracted an illness and died in 1911.

== Early life ==
Shantser was the son of Leon Schantser, an Austrian engineer who had become a winemaker. His mother was a descendant of Louis-Vincent Tardan, the founder of the Swiss community in Shabo and also a winemaker. He attended the Gymnasium in Nikolaev, and in the late 1880s he became a supporter of People’s Will, the major populist revolutionary organization. He attended the University of Yuryev in Tartu where he joined a Social Democratic student circle. After graduating in 1899 he moved to Moscow where he undertook party work for the Russian Social Democratic Labour Party. However he was arrested and exiled to Eastern Siberia. Following the Second Congress of the RSDLP in 1903, he became a Bolshevik.

== 1905 Revolution and after ==
In 1904 he became a member of the Bolshevik Moscow Committee, where he soon took on a leading role during the 1905 Revolution, editing the newspaper Rabochii. He was elected to the executive of the Moscow Soviet at its first meeting in November, and as one of a trio who ran the Bolshevik organisation during the preparations for the Moscow insurrection – the others being Martyn Liadov and Mikhail Vasilyev-Yuzhin. According to Liadov "Shantser was a colourful personality (who) went about his business carrying two revolvers in his belt, but was honest and tactful in his dealings with his Party colleagues". The historian Nikolai Rozhkov, who was also in Moscow at the time, recorded that Shantser was "the actual leader of the Moscow Committee of the Bolsheviks" and a strict and demanding "guardian" of "Bolshevik purity and orthodoxy".

Shanster was arrested during a police raid in December – the day when the uprising began – but the police failed to identify him properly, and he was treated as a minor offender, and exiled to Yeniseysky District, from whence he soon escaped to Omsk and then to Saint Petersburg. He attended the Fifth Congress of the RSDLP in London, 1907. Here he was elected to the Bolshevik Centre, the clandestine leadership of the Bolshevik faction. He was arrested again later that year and exiled to Siberia, and then to Turukhansky District. He escaped again and by 1909 was in Paris. where he was appointed to the editorial board of Proletary on 13 August 1908, replacing Bogdanov who had resigned.

Abroad, the Bolsheviks were divided over the issue of whether their deputies should participating in the Third Duma, which Lenin thought they should. In June 1909, the issue was debated by the enlarged editorial board of Proletary in June 1909, at which Bogdanov and Shantser were the leading representatives of the Otzovists, who advocated a boycott. When the split became open, Shantser joined Bogdanov in the Vpered faction of the RSDLP.

In Paris, Shantser fell seriously ill, possibly from tuberculosis. He returned to Moscow, where he died in a police hospital in 1911. Pavel Malyantovich looked after his two children until 1917. His son Evgeny Shantser grew up to become a prominent geologist.
