= Fedor Kalinin =

Russian revolutionary, literary critic and writer

- Фёдор Калинин
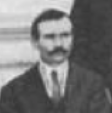
- Fedor Kalinin at the Presidium of the National Proletkult Organisation elected at the first national conference, September 1918
- Born: February 18, 1882; Shiklovo, Vladimir Governorate, Russian Empire
- Died: February 6, 1920 (aged 37); Moscow, Soviet Russia
- Relatives: Mikhail Kalinin (brother)
- Writing career
- Years active: 1906–1920
- Genre: Proletarian literature
- Subject: Culture
- Notable works: The Proletariat and Creativity
- Movements: Vpered, Proletkult

Fedor Ivanovich Kalinin (Russian: Фёдор Иванович Калинин; 14 February 1882 – 5 February 1920) was a Russian revolutionary, literary critic and writer.

Kalinin was born on February 14, 1882 (or 1883, according to some sources) in the village of Shiklovo in the industrial region of Vladimir province. He started working at the age of 12, variously as a carpenter, typesetter, and a weaver, like his father, at a factory in Strunino. While working he became acquainted with Russian fiction and criticism, then moved on to political literature.

Dismissed from the factory, he moved to Yaroslavl, where he joined the student-worker circle of self-education. The members of the circle were preparing an assassination attempt on the Yaroslavl governor, but the police uncovered the plot.

Fedor Kalinin spent more than a year in prison, after which in 1902 he was exiled to the Arkhangelsk province. He returned from exile in 1904, then got a job as a warper at the factory of S. Baranov in Alexandrov.

After the events of Bloody Sunday, Fedor actively joined the labor movement. Against the background of the events of the First Russian Revolution, there was an uprising of workers in Alexandrov, on December 9, 1905, power in the city and district passed to the Council of Workers' Deputies, headed by F. I. Kalinin, and the so-called Alexandrov Republic arose. After four days, the uprising was crushed, Fedor Kalinin was arrested and was subsequently sentenced (according to various sources) to either two years and two months or three years in prison.

After his release, he emigrated. He studied at the Capri Party School, where he met Alexander Bogdanov and Anatoly Lunacharsky, and together with them he created the Vpered'. He wrote concerning philosophy with an approach adapted by Bogdanov in The Philosophy of Living Experience published in 1913.

Kalinin was secretary to the "Circle of Proletarian Literature" established by the Russian Social Democratic Labour Party in Paris in 1913. He wrote concerning philosophy with an approach adapted by Bogdanov in The Philosophy of Living Experience published in 1913.

He was elected to the Central Committee of Proletkult in October 1917. Following the Bolshevik decree of 22 November [O.S. 9 November] 1917, the People's Commissariat for Education was established with a Department for the Assistance of Independent Class Educational Organisations. Kalinin was the head of the department, but the chair and two further members of the Department collegium would be directly elected by Proletkult. He was one of the editors of Proletarskaya Kul'tura with Pavel Lebedev-Polianskii and wrote "The Proletariat and Creativity".

His most important work in the pre-revolutionary period is his article "The Type of the Worker in Literature" (New Journal for All. 1912. No. 9), in which he criticized G. V. Plekhanov's article "On the Psychology of the Labor Movement" (1907), pointing out that the "idea of workers' solidarity", so admired by the critics, is nothing more than a manifestation of the "fanatical mysticism" and "sectarian-type solidarity" characteristic of closed, controlled communities which has nothing to do with the true moral orientation of the proletarians.

F. I. Kalinin died of a serious illness on February 5, 1920. He was buried at the Novodevichy Cemetery.

In 1922, the factory of S. Baranov in Alexandrov was named after F. Kalinin. At the same time, his bust was installed at the entrance of the factory. Later, in Alexandrov, a street was named after him.

== Works ==
- The Proletariat and Creativity
- Ideology and Production (1922) Moscow:Glavpolitprosveta (Biblioteka vserossiĭskogo proletkulʹta)
