= Borba =

Borba may refer to:

== Places ==
- Borba, Portugal, a municipality in Portugal
- Borba DOC, a Portuguese wine region
- Borba, Amazonas, a municipality in Amazonas state in Brazil, named for the town in Portugal

== Other uses ==
- Borba (surname), a Portuguese surname
- Borba (newspaper) (Борба)
- Borba (Paris), a Paris-based Russian leftwing group
- Borba Blanca, a Spanish wine grape
- Quincas Borba, a novel
- Refers to the grappling only variety of sport sambo (martial art)
