= Capri Party School =

Vperedist educational organization

The Capri Party School (Russian: Каприйская школа), known by its official name as The First Higher Social Democratic Propaganda and Agitational School for Workers was an educational organisation established by the Vperedists, a sub-faction in the Bolshevik faction of the Russian Social Democratic Workers Party. It was established by Maxim Gorky, Alexander Bogdanov, and Anatoly Lunacharsky, with Gorky providing the accommodation and funds essential to enable it to run. Its curriculum primarily reflected the viewpoint of these three founders who were part of the Russian intelligentsia, but hoped to influence Russian workers through the creation of a workers intelligentsia who would in turn develop proletarian culture.

The activities of the school was criticized by the editorial board of the Proletary newspaper. In response, the Bolshevik Centre established the Longjumeau Party School in 1911.

The school was open from August to December, 1909. Nikifor Vilonov was appointed its secretary.

== See also ==
- The Philosophy of Living Experience (1913): This is a book which Bogdanov probably based on the course he developed firstly at the Capri Party School and subsequently at the Bologna Party School. He quotes from unpublished work by Fedor Kalinin and Vilonov.
