= Vpered =

Anti-Lenin faction of the Russian Social Democratic Labour Party

Forward Вперёд
- Leader: Alexander Bogdanov
- Founded: 1909
- Dissolved: 1912
- Split from: Bolsheviks
- Succeeded by: Proletkult
- Ideology: Left communism Anti-Leninism
- Political position: Far-left
- National affiliation: RSDLP

Vpered (Russian: Вперёд, IPA: [fpʲɪˈrʲɵt], Forward) was a subfaction within the Russian Social Democratic Labour Party (RSDLP). Although Vpered emerged from the Bolshevik wing of the party, it was critical of Lenin. The group was gathered by Alexander Bogdanov in December 1909 and was active until 1912. Other notable members of the group were Maxim Gorky, Anatoly Lunacharsky, Mikhail Pokrovsky, Virgil Shantser, Grigory Aleksinsky, Stanislav Volski, and Martyn Liadov.

== Schism in Bolshevism ==
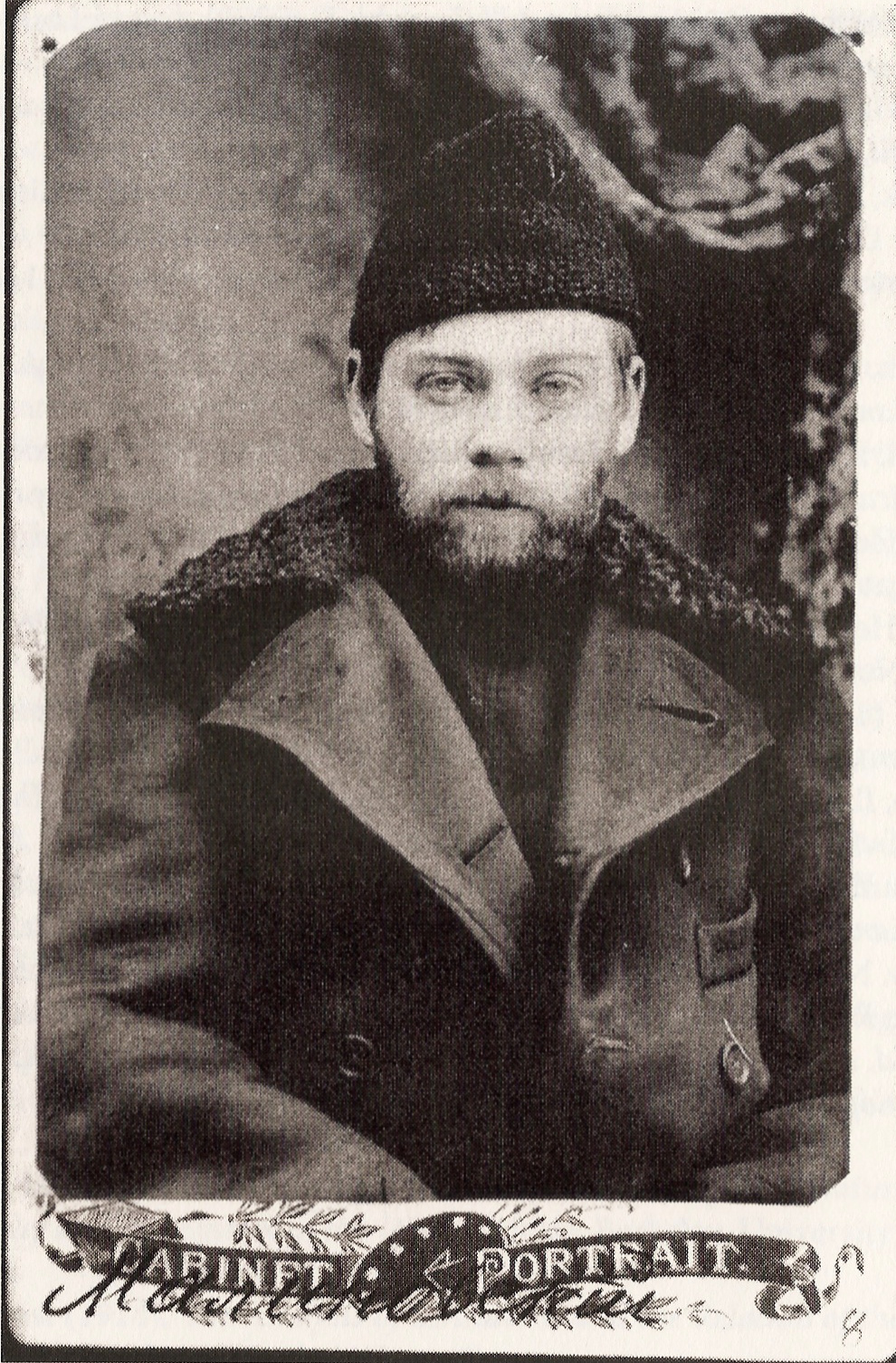
Alexander Bogdanov

Vpered developed in a political atmosphere of counterrevolution and squabbling for political control, authenticity and funds within the RSDLP. Philosophically, Bogdanov and his supporters envisaged a strong role for intellectuals in the party, along the lines of Lenin's What Is To Be Done?. They advocated ways for intellectuals of the party to systematise the socialist education of workers, in order to allow workers a greater and deserved role in the leadership of the party. Otherwise, with the departure of many intellectuals from the party, those remaining in its ranks would form the new party leadership. Meanwhile, Lenin had distanced himself from this work.

Vpered began when Bogdanov presented a statement to the editors of Proletarii (Workers, the Bolshevik journal). In a meeting with the editorial board in late June 1908, Lenin succeeded in having Bogdanov excluded from the board (but not from the party). and to the conference of the extended editorial board called by Lenin in June 1909 in Paris. In this context, Bogdanov raised the issue of the "practical work" of "widening and deepening the fully socialist propaganda" among the working class. He argued that the editors of Proletarii had not adequately addressed the intellectual development of the workers. He said that the lack of any "theoretical and historical" elaboration of the peoples' armed struggle against the autocracy meant the absence of "conscious leaders" in workers' organizations and that the intelligentsia were necessary to train workers as "conscious leaders". Bogdanov aimed to meet this challenge by organizing proletarian universities. Bogdanov hoped to nurture an "influential nucleus of workers" who could act as "conscious leaders" in all forms of proletarian struggle.

A 1909 Paris conference rejected Bogdanov's proposal outright, at which point Bogdanov left. Bogdanov then wrote a report, which appeared in July 1909. This delineated Vpered's agenda: that Lenin and his allies had fundamentally deviated from "revolutionary Marxism" and the centrality of the hegemonic role of the proletariat in the coming democratic revolution. Bogdanov and Krasin complained that Proletarii had failed to produce even one pamphlet in 18 months, and, that the party had abandoned socialist propaganda work.

The failure of the Russian Revolution of 1905 gave rise to bourgeois liberalism during the Duma period, rule by elected members, in the Social Democratic movement. Bogdanov and his allies accused Lenin and his partisans of allowing this through "parliamentarism at any price." Although the actions of the Otzovists, (those promoting decentralisation which Lenin feared would lead to the liquidation of the party), including Bogdanov, did constitute a reassertion of revolutionary Marxism, and may have been a point of unity, the recall of RSDLP delegates from the Duma was seen by Bogdanov as impractical.

== Proletarian universities ==
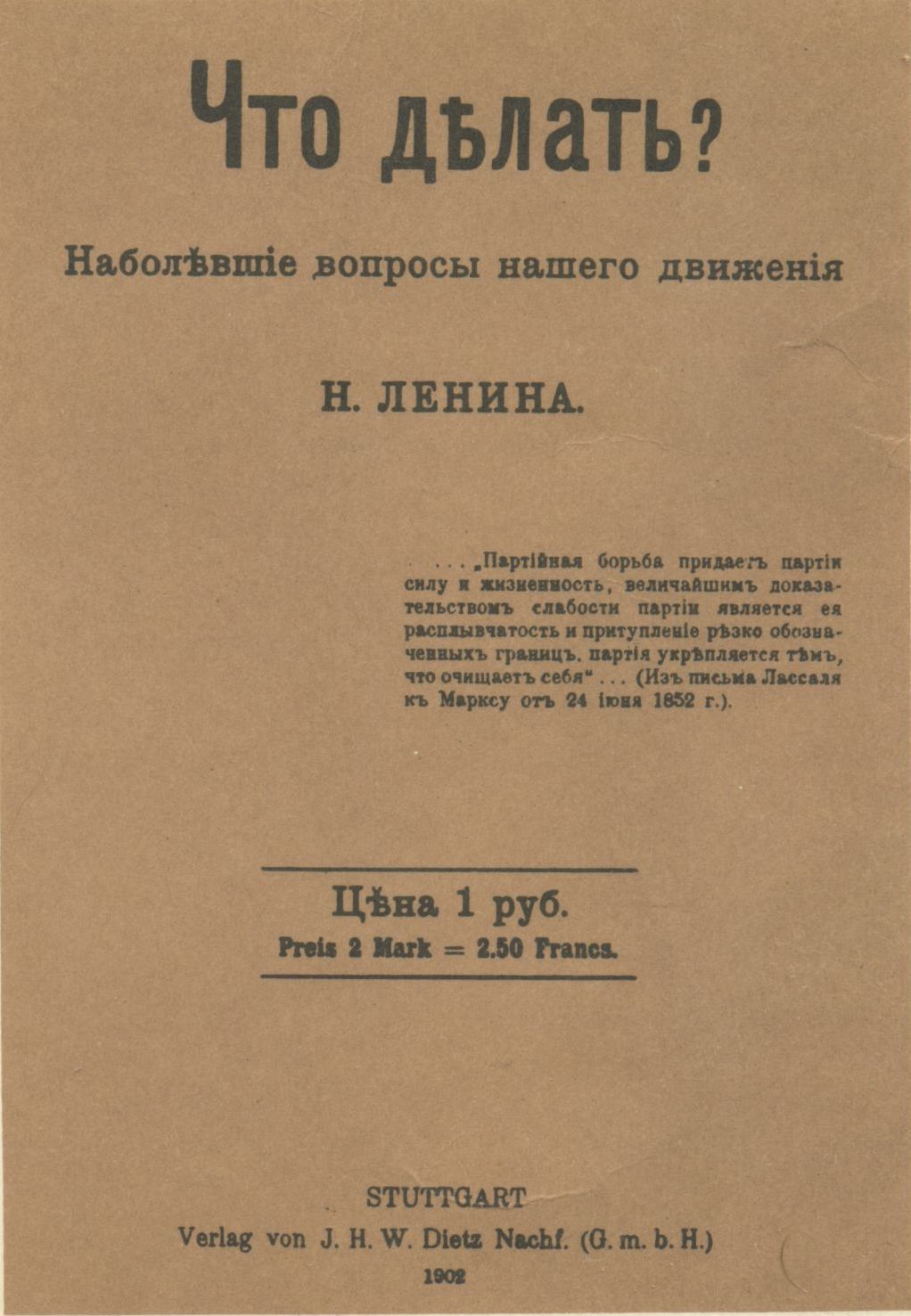
What Is to Be Done? (1902)

Vpered organised an experimental proletarian university on the Isle of Capri which operated from August to December 1909 (from Gorky's home on the island). Another operated in Bologna from November 1910 to March 1911. Lenin argued that Vpered had used 80,000 rubles for the undertaking and that the group should be expelled from the Russian Social Democratic Labour Party (RSDLP).

== Outcome ==
While Bogdanov and Lunacharsky had become disenchanted with party politics and sought to focus on education and proletarian culture, Alexinsky saw Vpered as perpetuating the "illegals" tradition which sought to use traditional means of subversion. Joined by Pokrovsky and Vyacheslav Menzhinsky, this redefined group gained control of the editorial board of Proletarii and disassociated it from "proletarian culture and science". However, Vpered lost momentum and eventually stalled in 1912.

Evidently, perhaps soon after the February Revolution, Vpered began being published as a Menshevik journal. In 1917, I. Iurenev, a Mezhraionka leader, published a three-part history of the underground movement which was founded in 1913. (See .I. lurenev, Borba za edinstvo partii, Petrograd, 1917. For the publication details of this pamphlet, see: (8) 'K svedeniiu T.T.!', Vpered, I, 15(2) June 1917, p. 15; Vpered, 3, 28(15) June 1917, p. 16; Vpered, 8, 12 August (30 July) 1917, p. 16. Vpered continued to be published 'in the first half of 1918 when socialist newspapers such as the Menshevik Vpered, Gorki's Novaia zhizn, and Delo naroda were tolerated.'
