= Vera Lebedeva =

Soviet physician (1881–1968)

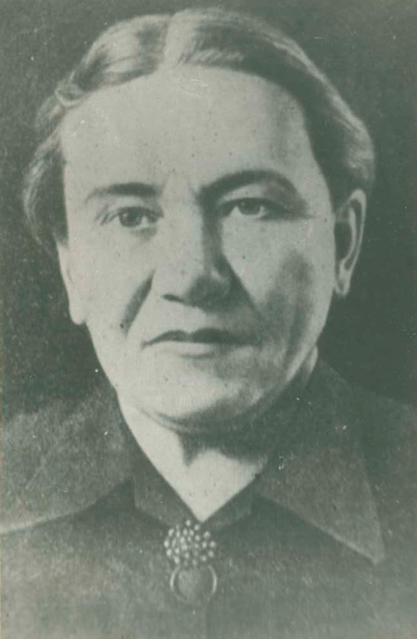
- Born: Vera Pavlovna Lebedeva; September 18, 1881; Nizhny Novgorod, Russian Empire
- Died: December 10, 1968 (aged 87); Moscow, Soviet Union
- Spouse: Pavel Lebedev-Polianskii

Academic background
- Education: Women's Medical Institute

Academic work
- Institutions: Central Institute for Maternity and Child Protection
- Main interests: Infant mortality

Vera Pavlovna Lebedeva (Russian: Вера Павловна Лебедева; September 18, 1881 – December 10, 1968) was a Soviet physician known for her political activity and her successful efforts to reduce infant mortality in the nation.

== Early life and education ==
Lebedeva was born in Nizhny Novgorod in 1881; her father, a cook, died in 1892, leaving the family dependent on charity. Despite this, Lebedeva graduated from the gymnasium and earned a gold medal, then took a job as a schoolteacher in a rural area. By 1901, she was financially stable enough to attend the Women's Medical Institute in Saint Petersburg, but was expelled twice due to her political activities. Lebedeva joined the Bolshevik faction of the Russian Social Democratic Labour Party in 1907 and was a participant in the Russian Revolution of 1905–1907. She eloped to Finland with the Bolshevik, Pavel Lebedev-Polianskii, and then fled to Geneva in the interim, but graduated from the Institute in 1910.

== Career ==
Though she was fired from her first job as a district physician in Russia for political activity, Lebedeva soon returned to Geneva, where her political views were more accepted. Beginning in 1912, she was an obstetrician/gynecologist in Geneva. In 1917 she became returned to Russia and came back to the nascent Soviet Union for good. Her first position in the new country was as the director of the Central Institute for Protection of Motherhood and Infancy; she chaired that institute from 1918 to 1930. There, she instituted the world's first public health program aimed at reducing infant mortality. The innovative program consisted of a network of nurseries and preschools, each staffed with a qualified pediatrician who could monitor the children's health and advise parents. The program was very successful. She also supported legalized abortion as a positive policy that supported women in the workforce. Lebedeva also worked to procure donations from the Rockefeller Foundation for Soviet relief campaigns.

In 1924, she attended a congress of the Medical Women's International Association. During this time she also ran the American Medical Women's Association's medical relief efforts in the Caucasus region. Lebedeva's career in public health grew as she was charged with researching disabilities (from 1931 to 1934), and then as a state public health inspector, from 1934 to 1938. For the next 12 years, she directed Moscow's Central Institute of Advanced Training for Physicians.

== Honors ==
Lebedeva was awarded the Order of the Red Banner of Labour and the Order of Lenin, the latter three times.
