= Olonets electoral district =

1917 Russian electoral constituency

Olonets
- Former Civilian constituency for the All-Russian Constituent Assembly
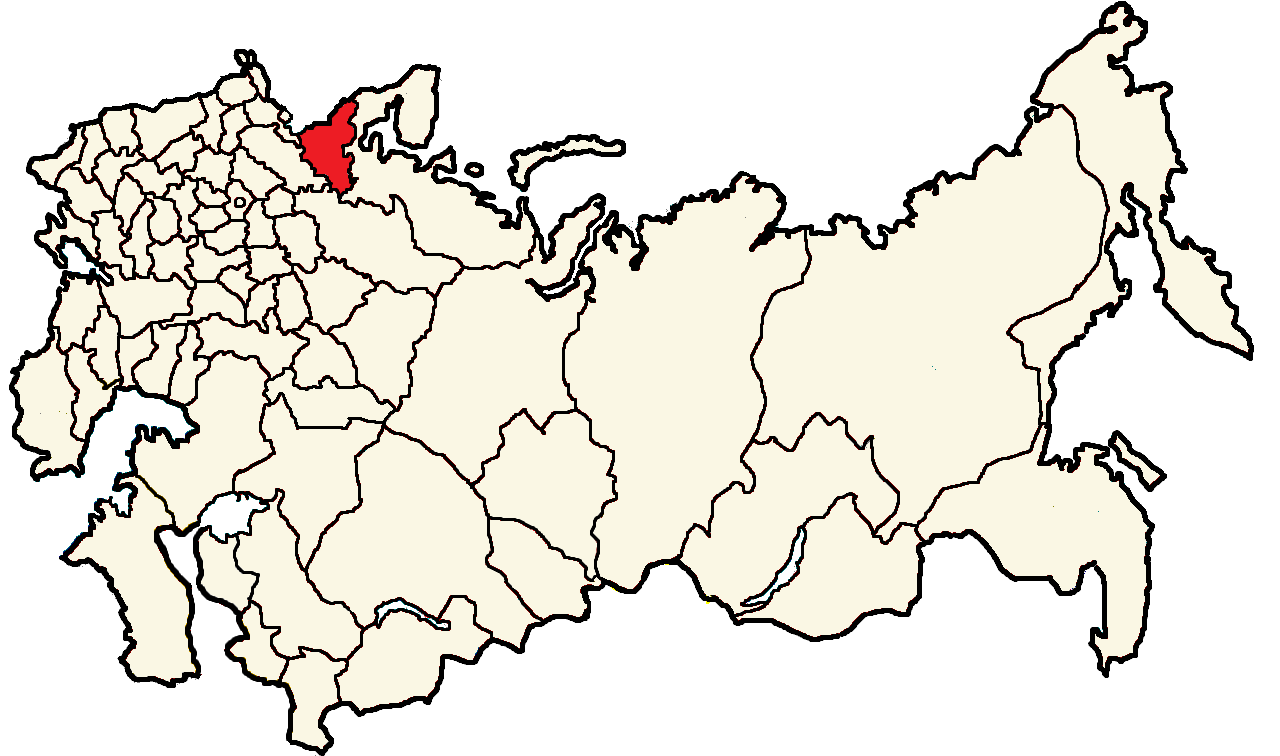

Former constituency
- Created: 1917
- Abolished: 1918
- Number of members: 2
- Number of Uyezd Electoral Commissions: 7
- Number of Urban Electoral Commissions: 1
- Number of Parishes: 17

The Olonets electoral district (Russian: Олонецкий избирательный округ) was a constituency created for the 1917 Russian Constituent Assembly election. The electoral district covered the Olonets Governorate. Olonets had special electoral system, electing 2 deputies and with each voter having 2 votes.

== Candidates ==
Five candidates were in the fray for the 2 seats from Olonets. Andrey Fedorovich Matveev of the Socialist-Revolutionary Party and Matvei Dmitrievich Shishkin of the Russian Social Democratic Labour Party (Mensheviks) ran on List 1 - Soviet of Peasants' Deputies. The Kadet Party had fielded Deyakonov and Melekhov on its List 2. List 3 - 'Citizens of Vazhinskaya Volost, Olonets Uezd' had a single candidate (Mirokhin), who was a member of Plekhanov's Unity faction.

== Results ==
Olonets
Uezd	Matveev (SR)	Shishkin (Menshevik)	Melekhov (Kadet)	Deyakonov (Kadet)	Mirokhin (Unity)
Petrozavodsk town	4,515	4,498	1,829	1,600	262
Petrozavodsk uezd	21,123	21,057	3,624	3,367	517
Olonets	12,057	11,918	3,159	3,069	480
Lodeynoye Pole	15,542	15,442	2,142	2,092	191
Povenets	10,864	10,846	1,621	1,553	144
Kargopol	35,129	35,382	3,394	3,290	536
Pudozh	10,806	10,783	2,414	2,186	446
Vytegra	17,084	16,901	2,095	1,994	237
Total:	127,120 (elected)	126,827 (elected)	20,278	19,151	2,813

Deputies Elected
Matveev	SR-Menshevik bloc
Shishkin	SR-Menshevik bloc
