= Pavel Malyantovich =

- Павел Малянтович
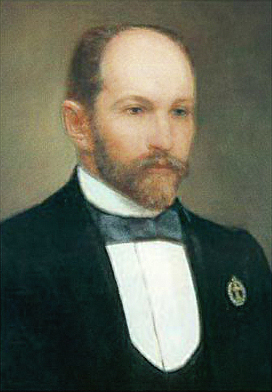

27th Minister of Justice of Russia
- In office 8 October 1917 – 7 November 1917
- Preceded by: Alexander Demyanov
- Succeeded by: Office abolished Georgy Oppokov as People's Commissar of Justice of the Russian Socialist Federative Soviet Republic

Personal details
- Born: 4 July 1869 Vitebsk, Vitebsk Governorate, Russian Empire
- Died: 22 January 1940 (aged 70) Moscow, Soviet Union
- Resting place: New Don Cemetery
- Spouse: Angelina Pavlovna Dara
- Children: Sons Nikolay, Vladimir, George; Daughter Gallia
- Education: University of Yuryev
- Occupation: Lawyer, prosecutor

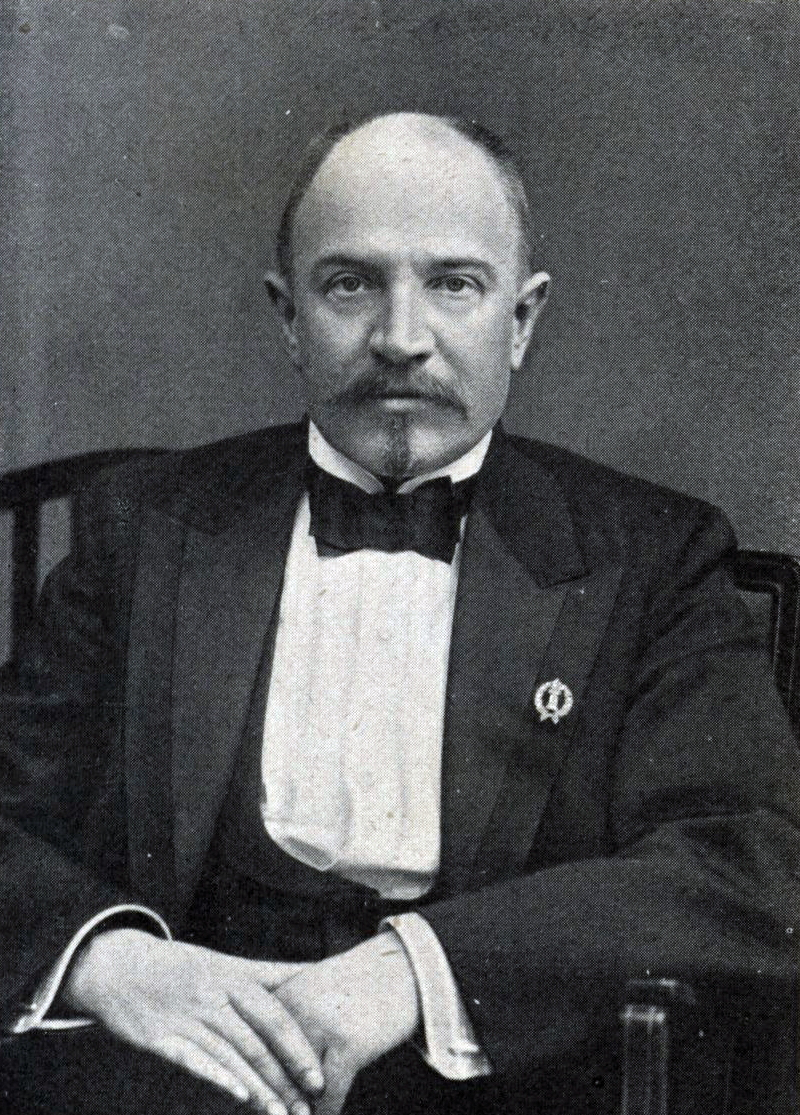
Pavel Malyantovich, 1909

Pavel Nikolayevich Malyantovich (Russian: Павел Николаевич Малянтович; 4 July 1869 – 22 January 1940) was a Russian politician and lawyer. Minister of Justice of the Provisional Government (1917), Supreme Prosecutor of Russia (1917). He was arrested during the Great Purge and later executed.

== Family ==
He was born in the family of a private nobleman. His brother Vladimir Nikolayevich, a lawyer, was shot during the period of repression; his family also died. Another brother, Vsevolod Nikolayevich (1885–1949), was also a lawyer, and lived in emigration in France after the civil war, where he was a journalist.

His wife, Angelina Pavlovna, nee Dara, previously married name Kranichfeld, came from a Greek family. By the time of the last arrest of her husband, she was blind and was bedridden.

He had three sons: Nikolay, who lived in emigration, Vladimir, and George, who was shot in the late 1930s. His only daughter, Galli Pavlovna, lived until 1981.

His grandson Kirill Georgievich was a veteran of World War II and a famous Soviet animator who directs cartoons about Dunno and other subjects. Kirill was arrested in 1951, spent five years in prison, and died of natural causes in 2007. Another grandson, Nikita Georgievich, distinguished himself in World War II, winning three orders of the Patriotic War, I and II degrees, paratrooper.

Malyantovich took on the upbringing of two children of the deceased Bolshevik, assistant attorney Virgil Shantser, known as Marat, until 1917.

== Education and the beginning of a revolutionary activity ==
He graduated from high school in Smolensk, then studied at the law faculty of Moscow University. He participated in the opposition movement there, and was brought in for questioning concerning the distribution of the revolutionary magazine "Self-Government" in 1889. In 1890 he was imprisoned for three months in a case charging him with participation in a criminal association brought by the Smolensk Gendarme Office. In 1891 he was expelled from Moscow University with a prohibition against residing in Moscow and the Moscow Province. He moved to the Faculty of Law of University of Yuryev, where he graduated in 1893.

== Lawyer ==
Malyantovich began practicing law in 1893, acting as an Attorney at Law of the Moscow Court of Justice District in 1898. In 1895–1896 he became one of the founders of the workers' advocates' circle, which included young Moscow lawyers, Nikolai Muravyov, Vasily Maklakov, Nikolai Teslenko, and Mikhail Khodasevich. They not only did not take money from clients who were involved in political affairs, but also spent their own money in their defense work. By 1902 the circle turned into a political defense group.

He participated in many political trials, defending the workers of the Morozovskaya factory in 1899 and winning the acquittal of 37 defendants out of 90 against the prosecution's claims that all members of a group were responsible for the actions of the others. He defended demonstrators in Sormovo and Nizhny Novgorod in 1902; among his clients were working Pavel Zalomov, who became the prototype of Pavel Vlasov, the hero of Maxim Gorky's story "Mother". He also defended participants in the unrest at Tikhoretskaya station (1903). In the same year, he successfully defended the workers of the Khludov pulp mill in the Ryazan Governorate, who were accused of unrest and resistance to the authorities, and the Kostroma workers who were accused of "economic hatred" attacks. He was also a defender of the peasants of the Kharkov and Poltava Governorates Provinces who were accused of unrest, and the workers of Gus-Khrustalny.

He went on to act as a lawyer not only for workers, but also for other revolutionaries. From 1904 to 1905 he participated in the trial of Nikolay Bauman, Elena Stasova and other members of the Russian Social Democratic Labour Party. During the revolution of 1905–1907, he defended members of the Saint Petersburg Soviet of Workers' Deputies (Leon Trotsky was involved in this process) and participants in the uprising on the cruiser Memory of Azov (1906), as well as more than a hundred other political cases.

Together with his colleague Nikolai Muravyov, Malyantovich wrote a book "Laws on Political and Social Crimes. Practical comment" (Saint Petersburg, 1910). Malyantovich actively sympathized with his clients, making radical speeches at lawyers' meetings. He participated in the social democratic movement, hesitated between the Bolsheviks and the Mensheviks (he was not officially a member of the party), and was constantly under police surveillance. In 1905 his apartment was a meeting place for the Moscow Committee of the Russian Social Democratic Labor Party, whose members he defended at the 1909 trial. According to the Police Department, in 1909 he gave funds to the Russian Social Democratic Labor Party to dig under a prison in order to free prisoners there.

He won the civil action brought by the heirs of Savva Morozov, who challenged his will which bequeathed 100 thousand rubles to Maria Andreyeva for transfer to the Bolshevik party. After the legal victory he received the money by proxy and handed it over to Leonid Krasin, one of the Bolshevik leaders. In 1915 he took as his assistant the Menshevik Andrey Vyshinsky, a participant in the revolutionary movement.

== Minister of Justice ==
In September 1917, at the suggestion of Alexander Kerensky, Malyantovich became Minister of Justice of the Provisional Government (fourth composition). Before that, he joined the Russian Social Democratic Labor Party (Mensheviks) in order to represent it in the government. He was conciliatory towards the Bolsheviks, perceiving them as colleagues in the revolutionary movement. Despite this, he signed an order for the arrest of Vladimir Lenin, which was never executed, while at the same time warning Lenin about the impending arrest.

On 7 November 1917 he was arrested along with other members of the Provisional Government by the rebels, and was sent to the Peter and Paul Fortress. A day later, like other socialist ministers, he was released.

== Activities after 1917 ==
Retiring from political activities, he returned to Moscow. The writer Ivan Bunin, who met with him, noted in his diary on 12 March 1918 that Malyantovich did not perceive the events as a tragedy: "And this is still a holiday, everything from them is like water. Pink, lively". In August 1918 he left for the South of Russia, where he lived in Pyatigorsk and Ekaterinodar. He was arrested in 1920.

In September 1921, the People's Commissars of Education and Justice Anatoly Lunacharsky and Dmitry Kursky (who had been Malyantovich's colleague in political defense) summoned him to Moscow, where he served as legal adviser on the presidium of the Supreme Council of National Economy. He joined the Moscow Board of Defenders, which he headed for some time, and was a member of the first staff of the Presidium of the All-Russian Lawyers Association. He also participated in the activities of the Political Prisoners Assistance Committee, the Political Red Cross.

In 1930 he was arrested in the case of the Union Bureau of the Russian Social Democratic Labor Party (Mensheviks), was in Butyrka prison for several months, and was sentenced to 10 years in prison in May 1931, but was then released after intercession from the old Bolsheviks.

== Last arrest and death ==
In November 1937 he was again arrested, and was held in the Lubyanka, Lefortovo and Butyrka prisons. He pleaded not guilty. In particular, during the interrogation on 14 January 1939, the investigator's demand to testify about "his counter-revolutionary activities" stated: "I intend to say the same thing today, what I will say tomorrow and the day after tomorrow, that I have never been engaged in counterrevolutionary activities, I have not been in any counterrevolutionary organizations and I have not led them". Malyantovich and his wife turned for help to Prosecutor General Vyshinsky, but he refused.

On 21 January 1940 the Military Collegium of the Supreme Court of the Soviet Union sentenced the 70-year-old Malyantovich to death. On 22 January that year he was shot. He is buried in the New Don Cemetery.

He was rehabilitated on 29 August 1959.

== Participation in the shooting of the film "Lenin in October" ==
Yuri Nikulin offers the following account in his book "Almost Seriously":

Today I was told about the filming of the film "Lenin in October". When director Mikhail Romm filmed the scene of a meeting of the Provisional Government, he examined the participants for a long time and, stopping against a bearded man, whom everyone jokingly called Chernomor, took him by the beard and exclaimed:
– Why the hell did you stick this broomstick here?
– Sorry, but this is my beard – Chernomor began to justify himself.
During the shooting, the question arose of what orders Kerensky wore and how many adjutants he had.
– Did anyone find out? – Romm asked the crew.
In the ensuing silence came the confident voice of Chernomor.
– Alexander Fedorovich wore only a university badge, and he had two adjutants.
– How do you know where? – Romm was surprised.
– For your information, – answered Chernomor, – I’m a former minister of the Provisional Government Malyantovich.
So the former minister became the chief consultant for all episodes related to the Provisional Government, and played himself in the film.

Alexander Solzhenitsyn relates the same story in the "Gulag Archipelago". The story is, however, probably apocryphal. The film was shot in 1937, and in November of the same year Malyantovich was arrested and later executed. This report comes from 1964, 27 years later. Although the actor playing Malyantovich resembles photographs of Malyantovich himself, the actor Sergei Tsenin, who had a film career lasting nearly forty years, almost certainly portrayed Malyantovich in the film.

== Bibliography ==
- Stay in Your Covenant... Nikolai Konstantinovich Muravyov. Lawyer and Public Figure. Moscow, 2004.
- Nikolai Troitsky. The Advocacy in Russia and the Political Processes of 1866–1904. – Tula, 2000.
