= Mikhail Vasilyev-Yuzhin =

Russian revolutionary, Soviet bureaucrat and jurist (1876–1937)

- Михаил Васильев-Южин
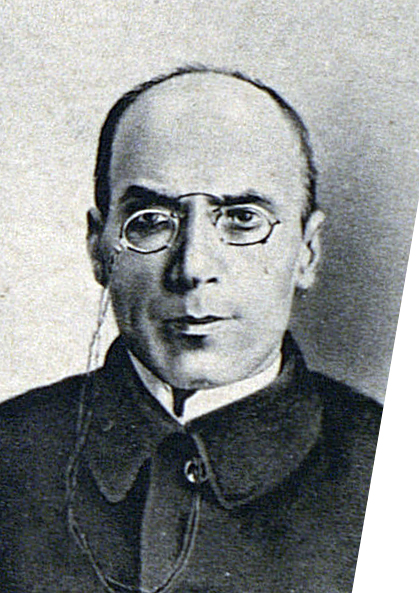
- Born: 10 November 1876; Pyatigorsk, Russian Empire
- Died: 8 November 1937 (aged 60)
- Cause of death: Execution by shooting
- Education: Imperial Moscow University (1901)
- Occupations: Revolutionary, bureaucrat, jurist
- Political party: Russian Social Democratic Labour Party (1898–1912); All-Union Communist Party (Bolsheviks) (from 1912)

Mikhail Ivanovich Vasilyev-Yuzhin (Russian: Михаил Иванович Васильев-Южин; 10 November 1876 – 8 November 1937) was a Russian Old Bolshevik revolutionary and Soviet bureaucrat and jurist who was a victim of the Great Purge.

== Early career ==
Vasilyev-Yuzhin was born into a working-class family in Pyatigorsk. He joined the Russian Social Democratic Labour Party in 1898 while he was an external student at Moscow University, where he graduated in 1901 from the Physics and Mathematics Faculty.

When the RSDLP split, in 1903, he joined the Bolsheviks. Early in 1905, he was sent by Vladimir Lenin to Odessa to support the sailors who had mutinied on the Battleship Potemkin, but did not reach the city until several days after the Potemkin had sailed. In the weeks preceding the Moscow uprising of 1905, he was part of a troika at the head of the Moscow Bolshevik party committee, along with Virgil Shantser and Martyn Liadov, and was elected to the executive of the Moscow Soviet when it was founded in November, but was caught in a police raid on 7 December, the day the uprising began, but the police failed to identify him.

In 1906–1917, he carried out work for the Bolsheviks in Baku, Saint Petersburg and Saratov, and was arrested several times, though was not seriously persecuted.

== Post-1917 career ==
During the February Revolution in 1917, Vasilyev-Yuzhin was elected deputy chairman of the Saratov Soviet, and chairman of the provincial committee of the Bolsheviks. During the October Revolution, he led the armed rising in Saratov that brought the province under Bolshevik control. When the Cheka was founded in December 1917, Vasilyev-Yuzhin was appointed a member of its collegium, and was one of the founders of the Soviet militia.

During the Russian Civil War, he acted as a political commissar for the 15th Army, and took part in the suppression of the Tambov Rebellion.

From January 1919 to 1922 he was a member of the Collegium of the People's Commissariat of the Interior and from December 1918 to April 1921 he was the head of the Main Police Department.

In August 1922 he was appointed a prosecutor, first with the Special Tribunal, later for the Russian Supreme Court. On 8 February 1924, he was appointed Deputy Chairman of the USSR Supreme Court. He chaired numerous trials, and was one of the panel of judges at the Shakhty Trial, the first major show trial of the Stalin era.

Vasilyev-Yuzhin was arrested in 1937, and shot on 8 November. He was posthumously rehabilitated. He is buried in the columbarium of Novodevichy Cemetery, section 79-3-3, together with his wife, Maria Andreyevna Vasilyeva-Yuzhina (1878–1954).
