= The Philosophy of Living Experience =

Book by Alexander Bogdanov

The Philosophy of Living Experience (Russian: Философия живого опыта) is a book by Alexander Bogdanov, which he wrote in 1911 and published in 1913. Further editions were published in 1920 and 1923 without revision. However the 1923 addition contains an appendix "From Religious to Scientific Monism" delivered at the Institute of Scientific Philosophy in February 1923. This is the book in which Bogdanov most extensively discusses the relationship of his thought to both Karl Marx and Ernst Mach. The book was probably based on a course he developed firstly at the Capri Party School (1909) and subsequently at the Bologna Party School (1911). Indeed Bogdanov cites the unpublished work of Nikifor Vilonov, a worker-philosopher who attended the Capri school. An English translation was published in 2015.

== Publishing history ==
Two manuscripts of the text dating from 1911 is in the Russian Center for the Preservation and Study of Documents of Contemporary History (Rossiiskii tsentr khraneniiai izucheniia dokumentov noveishei istorii): the first consist of chapters I and II (205 pages) and the second covers Chapters III -IV (RTsKhIDNI f 259, op. 1, d17 and d18).

- The first edition (1913) was published in St Petersburg by Izdanie M. I. Semenova.
- The second edition (1920) was published in Moscow by Gosizdat.
- The third edition (1923) was published in both Moscow and St Peterburg by Kniga.
- An English translation by David G. Rowley was published by Historical Materialism in conjunction with Brill as Volume 8 of their "Alexander Bogdanov Library".

== Content ==
=== Introduction ===
(a) What is philosophy? Who needs it and why? Bogdanov starts this discussion by looking at the unpublished work of two worker-philosophers active at the time: Fedor Kalinin and Nikifor Vilonov.

(b) What came before philosophy?

(c) How did philosophy and science become distinguished from religion?

=== Chapter VI. Empiriomonism ===
(a) Labour causality (b) Elements of experience (c) Objectivity (d) Sociomorphism (e) Substitution (f) The picture of the world
