= Grigory Aleksinsky =

Russian politician and activist (1879–1967)

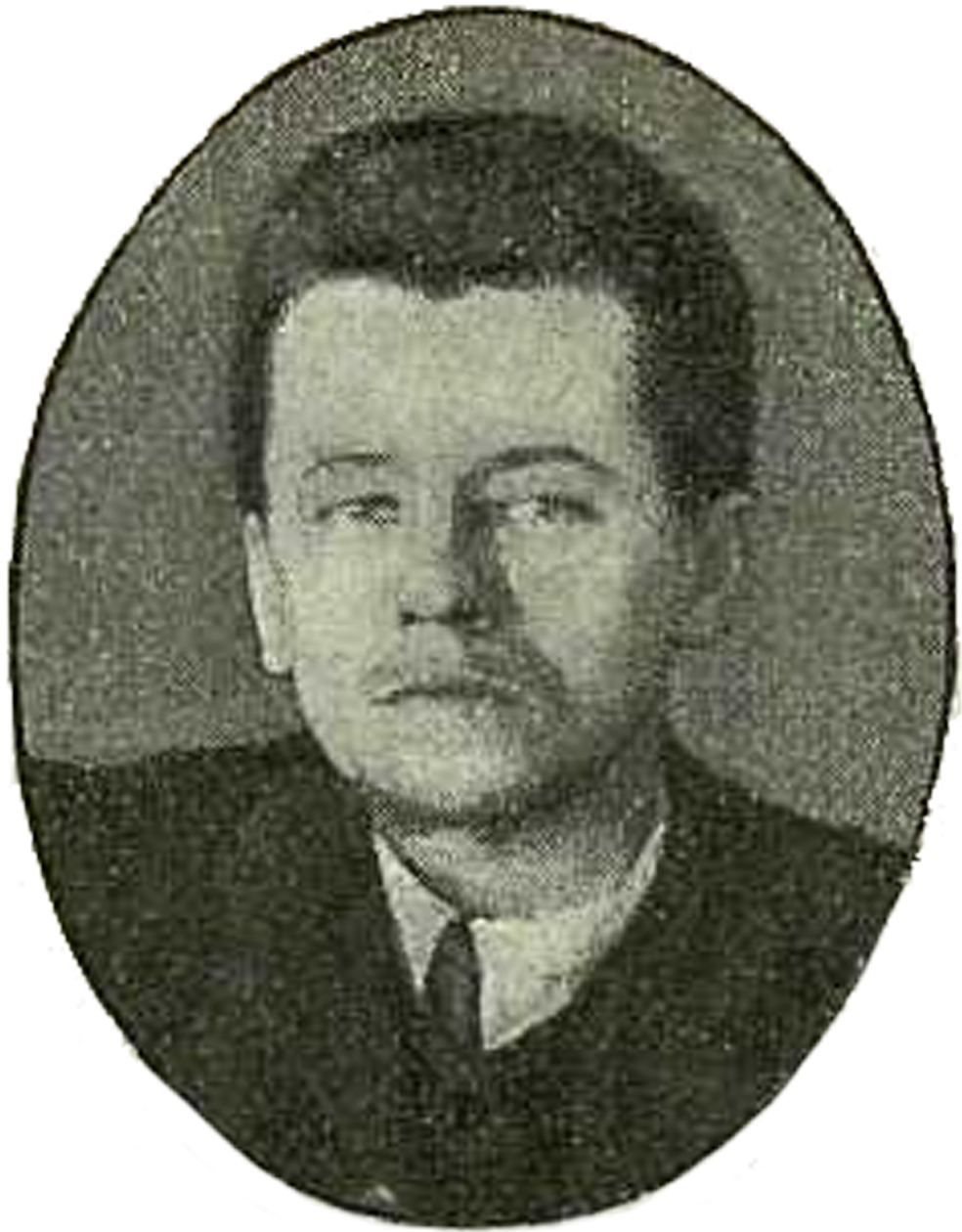
- Aleksinsky in 1907
- Born: 16 September 1879; Dagestan Oblast, Russian Empire
- Died: 4 October 1967 (aged 88); Paris, France
- Resting place: Sainte-Geneviève-des-Bois Russian Cemetery
- Education: Imperial Moscow University (1904)
- Political party: Russian Social Democratic Labour Party (1905–1917)

Grigory Alekseyevich Aleksinsky (Russian: Григо́рий Алексе́евич Але́ксинский; 16 September 1879 – 4 October 1967) was a prominent Russian Marxist activist, Social Democrat and Bolshevik who was elected to the Second Duma in 1907.

Born to middle-class parents in Daghestan, he became politically involved when he was a student at Moscow University, from which he was excluded. He was a member of Georgi Plekhanov’s Yedinstvo group, when he met Lenin in St Petersburg in December 1905 and joined the Bolsheviks. Lenin's wife, Krupskaya recalled going for a pleasant walk in the Finnish countryside with Lenin, Aleksinsky and others in spring 1906. Later, they were neighbours in Finland. In 1907, Alexinsky was elected to the Second Duma, where he proved to be a witty and effective orator. He escaped abroad to avoid arrest when the Duma was dissolved, and settled in Austria. Lenin hoped that he would take charge of smuggling illegal Bolshevik literature into Russia, but he "was quite unfitted for such work".

Alexinsky joined Lenin in Geneva, but fell out with him and in 1909 joined the ultra left Vpered, group, led by Alexander Bogdanov. On the outbreak of war, he veered sharply to the right, becoming an outspoken supporter of the Russian war effort. Leon Trotsky, who described Alexinsky as a "shrieking orator and passionate lover of intrigue" alleged that he made a practice of accusing opponents of the war of being paid German agents, and was expelled from the Paris Association of Foreign Journalists as a "dishonest slanderer". He returned to Russia in 1917, after the February revolution, and in July produced documents to support his contention that Lenin was a German agent. After the October Revolution he was arrested by the Cheka but was released on bail.

He escaped abroad in 1918, and joined the Russian National Committee, chaired by Vladimir Burtsev. In 1936, he published a story in a Russian emigre newspaper claiming that in 1905, Lenin had had an affair with a wealthy Russian woman named Elizabeth K., which he resumed in France in 1910. This story was taken seriously by one of Lenin's early biographers. David Shub, though it has since been dismissed as a fabrication. Alexinsky offered to sell the Soviet government, and then Columbia University, what he claimed were Lenin's letters to Elizabeth K., adding the new detail that she was his wife. He was not able to arrange a sale.

== Publications ==
- Modern Russia (1913)
- Russia and the great war (1915)
- Russia and Europe (1917)
