= Proletarskaya Kul'tura =

Proletarskaya Kul'tura (Russian: Пролетарская Культура; English: Proletarian Culture) was the main theoretical magazine published by Proletkult.

It was an important political and cultural publication in Russia following the Bolshevik seizure of power. It was edited by Pavel Lebedev-Polianskii and Fedor Kalinin. The magazine consisted of a series numbered up to 21, however as there were some multiple issues there were only 13 different publications They published such writers as Alexander Bogdanov and Aleksei Gastev.

In summer 1919, Rogozinsky's proposal to turn the Proletarian University into the Sverdlov Proletarian University, a proposal accompanied by restrictions in scope limited to creating a training school for government and party officials. That was backed up by an article in Izvestiya distinguishing between a 'proletarian' and 'communist' university, which would mean focusing on training party activists. Research into proletarian science, or producinga "Workers' Encyclopedia" would be set aside. When Maria Smith-Falkner, a professor at the Proletarian University, submitted a response which said that it was necessary to train leaders as well as organisers Izvestiya declined to publish it, and it appeared in Proletarskaya Kul'tura.

== See also ==
- Proletarian culture
