= Martyn Liadov =

Russian revolutionary and historian

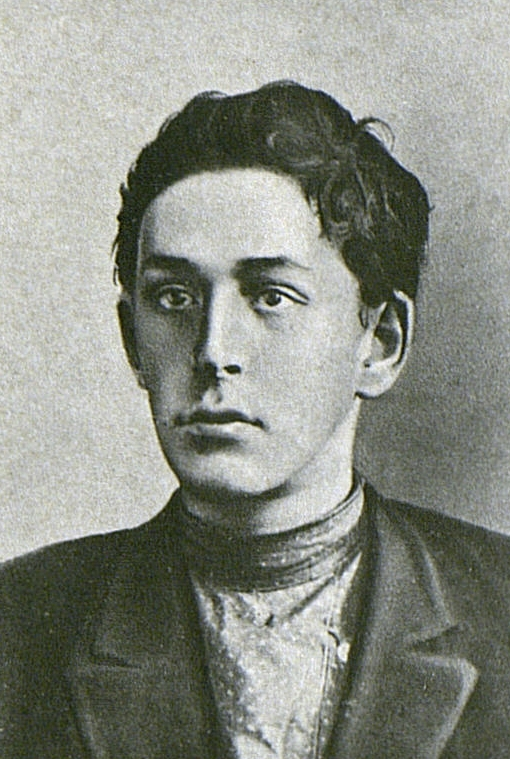
Liadov in 1905

Martyn Nikolaevich Liadov, (Russian: Мартын Николаевичч Лядов) pseudonym of Martyn Nikolaevich Mandel’shtam (24 August 1872 – 6 January 1947), was a Bolshevik revolutionary activist and historian.

== Biography ==
Liadov was born in Moscow on 12 August Old Style 1872, the son of a prominent obstetrician and gynecologist, Nikolai Martynovich (Nokhim Mendelevich) Mandelstam. He was expelled from school at around the age of 12, and was sent by his parents to live with his wealthy uncle in Mitau (Jelgava), in modern-day Latvia, where he enrolled at a German language school. His parents both died while he was at school. In 1889, he was barred from graduating after taking part in protests against the forced russification of German schools. He joined the Russian army as a volunteer, and in 1891 he was transferred to the reserves as a junior officer, and returned to Moscow.

Liadov was first drawn to the populist Narodnik movement in Moscow in 1891, but by 1893, he had been converted to Marxism by his brother, Grigori Mandelstam, who had returned to Moscow from Paris, and was involved in founding the Moscow Workers’ Union, the first Marxist organisation to have a following among factory workers in Moscow. He was arrested in 1892, and spent a short time in prison. In May 1895, he organised a meeting of the Central Workers' Union that drew a crowd of several hundred – the first of its kind held in Moscow. The meeting resulted in mass arrests, including Liadov's. He was held in prison for two years, then exiled to Verkhoiansk in 1897, for five years, after which he was sentenced to spend another two years under police supervision in Saratov, where he joined the Saratov Committee of the Russian Social Democratic Labour Party (RSDLP).

In 1903, Liadov emigrated to Geneva and attended the Second Congress of the RSDLP, where he supported Vladimir Lenin in the disputes that led to the RSDLP splitting between Bolsheviks and Mensheviks. He stayed loyal to Lenin when others were seeking to reunite the two factions, and took part in 1904 in the meeting of 22 Bolsheviks in Geneva, which created the 'Bureau of the Committees of the Majority', the forerunner of the Central Committee of the Communist Party, of which he was a member. He then attended the International Socialist Congress, Amsterdam 1904 as a Bolshevik delegate.

During the 1905 Revolution, Liadov led the Baku Bolsheviks, during a strike by oil workers, but was arrested in August. He escaped and reached Moscow on 13 October. There he was originally one of a triumvirate who led the Moscow Bolsheviks. The other two – V. L. Shanster and M. I. Vasilyev-Yushin – were arrested on 7 December, which meant that Liadov was leading the Moscow Bolsheviks when the workers put up barricades and fought the army for control of the working class districts of Moscow, but, according to the historian J.H.L.Keep, Liadov "spent these two days wandering aimlessly through the streets. He had no headquarters from which to transmit orders to the militia groups."

In January 1906, after the Moscow insurrection had been suppressed, Liadov travelled the Urals and Siberia, helping to organise the 4th Congress of the Russian Social Democratic Labour Party in Stockholm, which he attended as a delegate. He was also a delegate to the Fifth Party Congress in London in May 1907.

When the Bolsheviks split in June 1909, Liadov backed the Otzovisty faction, led by Alexander Bogdanov, and accused Lenin of being obsessed with "the statutory strengthening of his personal influence", an attitude which, he alleged, meant that the Bolsheviks had lost touch with the workers. In 1911, he moved to Baku and gave up illegal activity, to work in the oil industry, and later as an employee of the Nobel brothers.

After the February Revolution, in 1917, Liadov was elected acting Chairman of the Baku Soviet, until the chairman, Stepan Shaumian, returned from exile in Siberia, and was appointed editor of the soviet's newspaper, Izvestya Bakinskogo soveta. At this time, he was aligned with neither faction of the RSDLP, but was ousted when the Bolsheviks seized control in October 1917. He was arrested when the Turkish army occupied Baku, held in prison for two months, then deported to Georgia, where he worked for the Menshevik government for two years.

Liadov returned to Moscow in 1920. He was then readmitted into the Bolshevik Party and served on the Supreme Council of the National Economy. From 1923 to 1929, he was rector of the Sverdlov Communist University. Then he headed Glavnauka from 1928 to 1929. His history of the party, first published in 1906–07, was reissued in 1923–26. He was also head of the agitprop department of the Moscow regional party, whose first secretary was Nikolai Uglanov. In 1929, when Stalin began the forced collectivisation of agriculture, Liadov, supported the right wing opposition, led by Uglanov and Nikolai Bukharin, for which he was sacked, and ostracised after Stalinist gained control of the Moscow organisation. In 1930 he was appointed director of the Archive of the October Revolution and served as a member of the academic boards of the Lenin Institute and of Istpart. He retired with a special pension in 1932. He died in Moscow in 1947 aged 74 and his ashes were buried at the Novodevichy Cemetery.
