= Novgorod electoral district =

Constituency of the Russian Republic

Novgorod
- Former Civilian constituency for the All-Russian Constituent Assembly
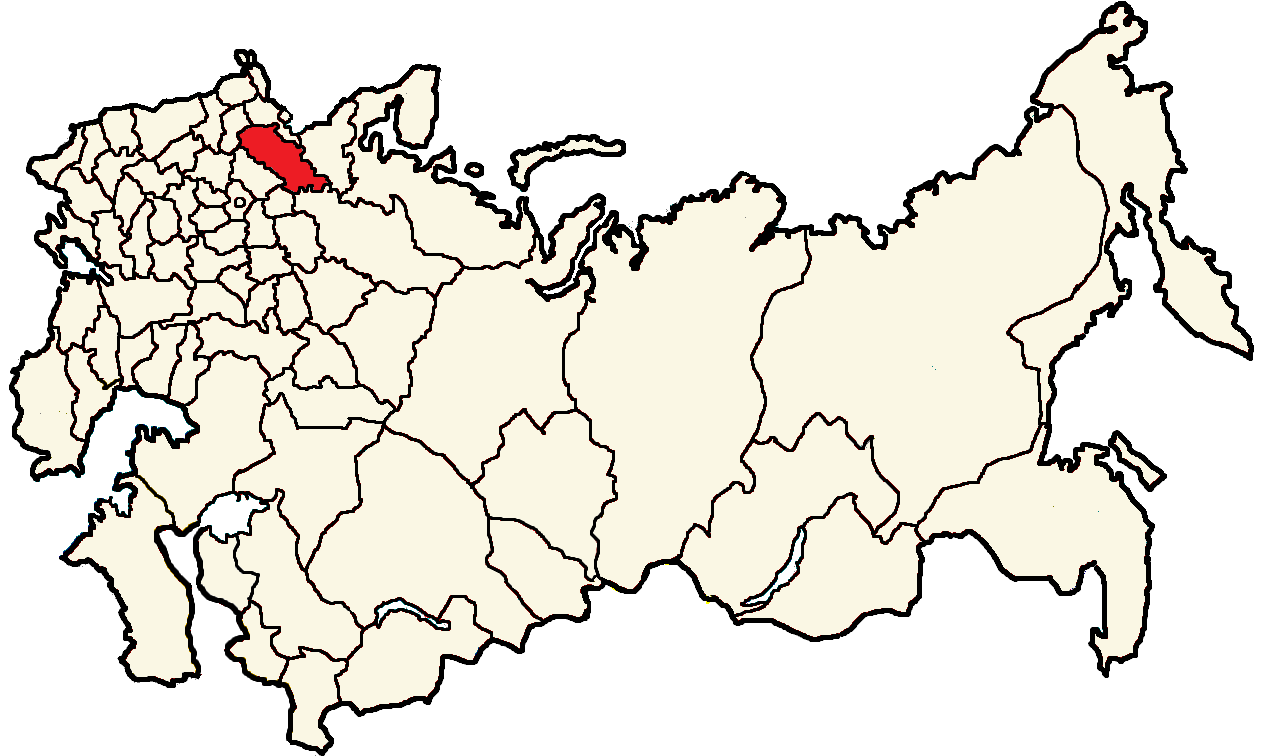

Former constituency
- Created: 1917
- Abolished: 1918
- Number of members: 8
- Number of Uyezd Electoral Commissions: 11
- Number of Urban Electoral Commissions: 1
- Number of Parishes: 245

The Novgorod electoral district (Russian: Новгородский избирательный округ) was a constituency created for the 1917 Russian Constituent Assembly election. The electoral district covered the Novgorod Governorate. Eight seats in the Constituent Assembly were assigned to the Novgorod constituency.

Whilst Novgorod was an agrarian province, the Bolsheviks obtained a good vote. This might have been because many inhabitants were accustomed to perform seasonal work in nearby Petrograd. 4 local peasants lists did not qualify to run in the election.

== Results ==
Novgorod
Party	Vote	%	Seats	%
List 4 - Socialist-Revolutionaries	220,665	45.36	4	44.44
List 6 - Bolsheviks	203,658	41.87	5	55.56
List 3 - Kadets	31,484	6.47		
List 1 - Popular Socialists	10,314	2.12		
List 9 - Mensheviks	9,336	1.92		
List 7 - Union of Landowners	7,804	1.60		
List 2 - Homeowners and Landowners of Novgorod Governorate	1,178	0.24		
List 8 - Union of Cooperativists	1,123	0.23		
List 5 - Unity	860	0.18		
Total:	486,422		9	

Deputies Elected
Gukovsky	SR
Kobyakov	SR
Leontiev	SR
Sokolov	SR
Ermakov	Bolshevik
Pashin	Bolshevik
Trotsky	Bolshevik
Uritsky	Bolshevik
Valentinov	Bolshevik
