= São João do Sul =

Coordinates: 29°13′S 49°48′W

- Municipality
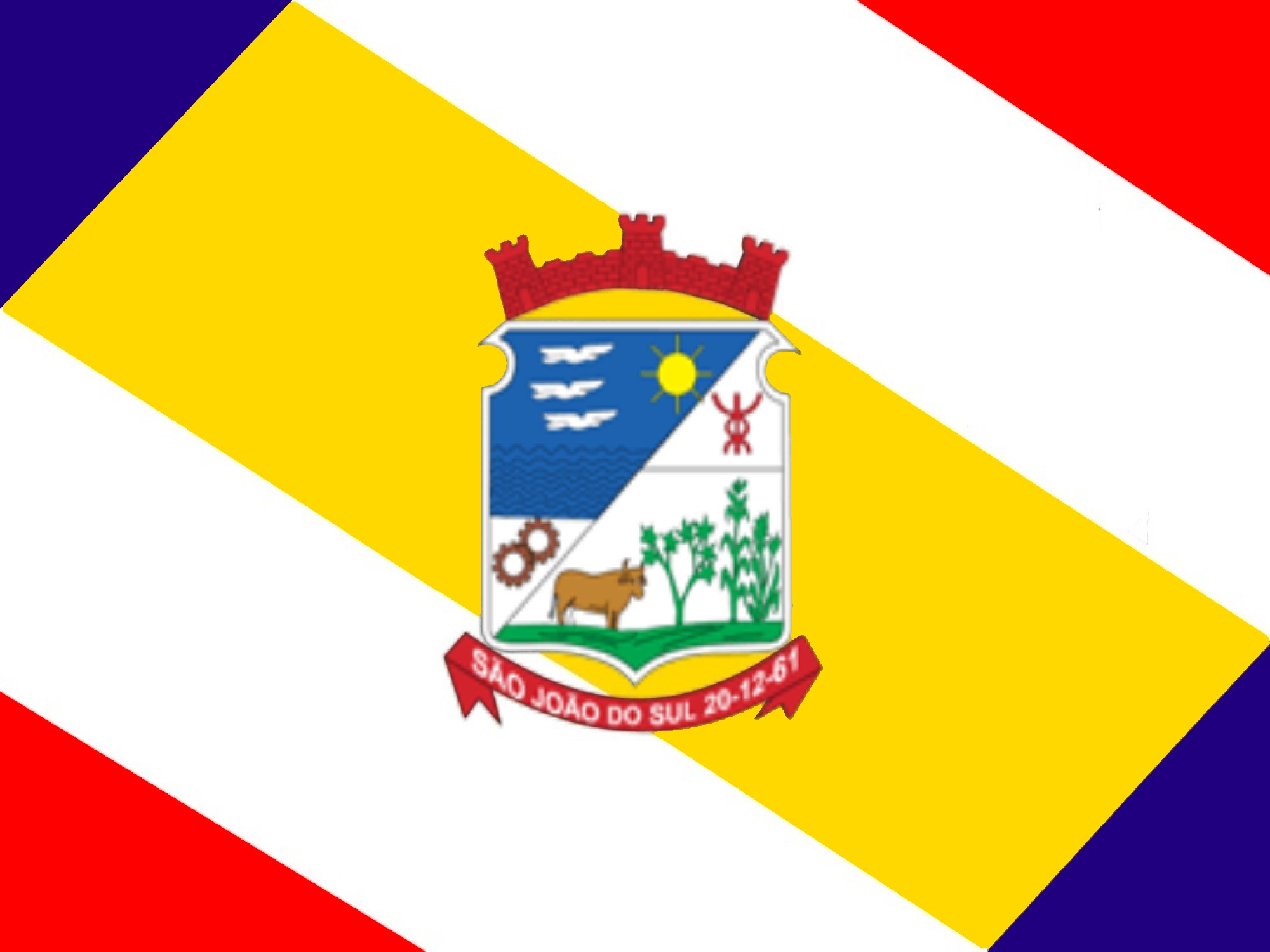
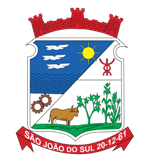
- Flag Coat of arms
- Interactive map of São João do Sul
- Country: Brazil
- Region: South
- State: Santa Catarina
- Mesoregion: Sul Catarinense

Population (2020)
  - Total: 7,315
- Time zone: UTC -3

São João do Sul is a municipality in the state of Santa Catarina in the South region of Brazil.

== History ==
By 1860, a small settlement had been established at a site known as Passo do Sertão, situated near a river crossing requiring ferry or canoe transport. The name reflected its location at a "step of the wilderness."

Colonization advanced gradually through successive waves of European settlers. German pioneers arrived early. One of the first groups settled in the Glória (now Glorinha) community around 1826, when the Schaeffer family relocated from the Torres colony in Rio Grande do Sul. Subsequent arrivals included João Evalt (in 1856), Jacó May (1860), Caetano Lummertz, and Antônio Miguel Magnus (1888), some bringing the "Magnus" surname still prevalent today.

In 1870, families from the Azores, including Martins, Rocha, Cardoso, Rodrigues, Aguiar, Borba, Mendonça, Luz, Reis, and Homem, began settling broadly across the area. Italian settlers followed in the early 20th century, particularly in Timbopeba. Families like Scandolara, Piazza, and Bianchini (originating from Meleiro and Cocal do Sul) helped foster early trade with the nearby Serra region. By 1900, these immigrant families; Emerich, Lummertz, Borba, and Abel, had firmly established the agricultural and cultural foundation of the community.

On February 3, 1891, the settlement of Passo do Sertão was elevated to district status within the municipality of Araranguá by decree no. 45. Later, on March 31, 1938, State Decree-Law no. 86 raised it to the "Vila Passo do Sertão." Finally, on December 20, 1961, Law no. 801 officially separated the district from Araranguá and created the municipality of São João do Sul, named in honor of its patron saint, John the Baptist.

== See also ==
- List of municipalities in Santa Catarina
