= Melenki =

Melenki (Russian: Меленки) is the name of several inhabited localities in Russia.

== Ivanovo Oblast ==
As of 2010, one rural locality in Ivanovo Oblast bears this name:

- Melenki, Ivanovo Oblast, a village in Privolzhsky District

== Kaluga Oblast ==
As of 2010, one rural locality in Kaluga Oblast bears this name:

- Melenki, Kaluga Oblast, a village in Dzerzhinsky District

== Kostroma Oblast ==
As of 2010, two rural localities in Kostroma Oblast bear this name:

- Melenki, Kadyysky District, Kostroma Oblast, a village in Chernyshevskoye Settlement of Kadyysky District
- Melenki, Susaninsky District, Kostroma Oblast, a village in Sokirinskoye Settlement of Susaninsky District

== Moscow Oblast ==
As of 2010, four rural localities in Moscow Oblast bear this name:

- Melenki, Dmitrovsky District, Moscow Oblast, a village in Kulikovskoye Rural Settlement of Dmitrovsky District
- Melenki, Klinsky District, Moscow Oblast, a village in Zubovskoye Rural Settlement of Klinsky District
- Melenki, Noginsky District, Moscow Oblast, a village in Akseno-Butyrskoye Rural Settlement of Noginsky District
- Melenki, Solnechnogorsky District, Moscow Oblast, a village in Krivtsovskoye Rural Settlement of Solnechnogorsky District

== Nizhny Novgorod Oblast ==
As of 2010, four rural localities in Nizhny Novgorod Oblast bear this name:

- Melenki, Bolshemurashkinsky District, Nizhny Novgorod Oblast, a village in Grigorovsky Selsoviet of Bolshemurashkinsky District
- Melenki, Gorodetsky District, Nizhny Novgorod Oblast, a village in Nikolo-Pogostinsky Selsoviet of Gorodetsky District
- Melenki, Pavlovsky District, Nizhny Novgorod Oblast, a village in Taremsky Selsoviet of Pavlovsky District
- Melenki, Sokolsky District, Nizhny Novgorod Oblast, a village in Loyminsky Selsoviet of Sokolsky District

== Tver Oblast ==
As of 2010, one rural locality in Tver Oblast bears this name:

- Melenki, Tver Oblast, a village in Torzhoksky District

== Vladimir Oblast ==
As of 2010, one urban locality in Vladimir Oblast bears this name:

- Melenki, Vladimir Oblast, a town in Melenkovsky District

== Yaroslavl Oblast ==
As of 2010, seven rural localities in Yaroslavl Oblast bear this name:

- Melenki, Danilovsky District, Yaroslavl Oblast, a village in Zimenkovsky Rural Okrug of Danilovsky District
- Melenki, Gavrilov-Yamsky District, Yaroslavl Oblast, a village in Stoginsky Rural Okrug of Gavrilov-Yamsky District
- Melenki, Diyevo-Gorodishchensky Rural Okrug, Nekrasovsky District, Yaroslavl Oblast, a village in Diyevo-Gorodishchensky Rural Okrug of Nekrasovsky District
- Melenki, Grebovsky Rural Okrug, Nekrasovsky District, Yaroslavl Oblast, a village in Grebovsky Rural Okrug of Nekrasovsky District
- Melenki, Pereslavsky District, Yaroslavl Oblast, a village in Nagoryevsky Rural Okrug of Pereslavsky District
- Melenki, Rostovsky District, Yaroslavl Oblast, a village in Sulostsky Rural Okrug of Rostovsky District
- Melenki, Yaroslavsky District, Yaroslavl Oblast, a village in Melenkovsky Rural Okrug of Yaroslavsky District

== See also ==
- Melenci (Serbian Cyrillic: Меленци), a village in Serbia
