= Nikifor Vilonov =

Mechanic, philosopher and political activist

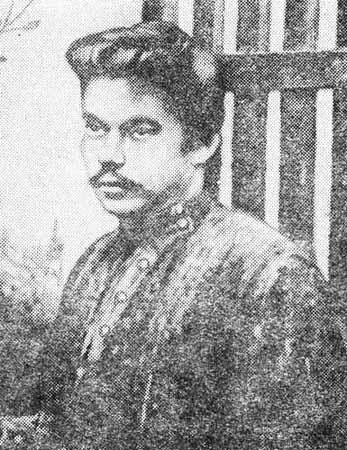
Nikifor Vilonov

Nikifor Efremovic Vilonov (Russian: Ники́фор Ефре́мович Вило́нов; 23 February 1883 – 1 May 1910) was a Russian revolutionary affiliated to the Bolsheviks who was imprisoned and then forced into exile, dying in Davos, Switzerland in 1910. He wrote philosophical tracts which influenced Alexander Bogdanov and was secretary of the Capri Party School established by Bogdanov, Lunacharsky and Gorky in 1909. Nevertheless, he sided with Lenin during the Bogdanov-Lenin philosophical dispute.

Vilonov was a mechanic at the Kaluga railway station in 1901–2. However he joined the Russian Social Democratic Workers Party and was soon a very effective agitator and organiser. He was particularly active in the general strike of 1903, which led to his arrest. During the 1905 Revolution he was chair person of the Samara Soviet. He married Mariia Zolina, and kept in touch with her while abroad.
