= Mezhraiontsy =

Faction of the Russian Social Democratic Labor Party

Mezhraiontsy межрайонцы
- Founder: Konstantin Yurenev; Aleksandr Novosyolov; Elena Adamovich; Nikolai Yegorov
- Founded: November 1913
- Dissolved: August 1917
- Split from: Bolsheviks (majority); Mensheviks (minority)
- Merged into: Bolsheviks
- Ideology: Marxism; Internationalism; Anti-factionalism
- Political position: Far-left
- National affiliation: Russian Social Democratic Labour Party

The Mezhraiontsy (Russian: межрайонцы, IPA: [mʲɪʐrɐˈjɵnt͡sɨ]), usually translated as the "Interdistrictites," were members of a small independent faction of the Russian Social Democratic Labor Party (RSDLP), which existed between 1913 and 1917. Although the organization's formal name was the Russian Social Democratic Labor Party (Internationalists), the names "Mezhraionka" for the organization and "Mezhraiontsy" for its participants were commonly used to indicate the group's intermediate ideological position between the rival Menshevik and Bolshevik wings of the divided RSDLP.

The Mezhraiontsy merged with the Bolsheviks during the Russian Revolution of 1917.

== Background ==
Russian social democrats had been split into numerous factions along political and ethnic lines since at least 1903 when the original divisions between the Bolsheviks and the Mensheviks arose. After the defeat of the Russian Revolution of 1905, both the Bolshevik and the Menshevik factions split into smaller factions. In January 1912, the dominant Bolsheviks, led by Vladimir Lenin, held a meeting in Prague, and expelled Mensheviks from the party. In response, the Mensheviks, Leon Trotsky's followers, the Jewish Bund and other ethnic social democratic groups held a meeting in Vienna in August 1912 in which they called Lenin's action illegal and formed their own leadership of the RSDLP, the so-called August Bloc. To distinguish between competing RSDLPs, the Bolshevik one was called RSDLP(b) and the Menshevik one RSDLP(m).

As a result of the developments, by late 1912 there were two separate social democratic organizations in St. Petersburg, the capital of the Russian Empire. The Bolsheviks had their "St. Petersburg Committee of the RSDLP (Bolsheviks)", and the "August Bloc" supporters had their "Initiative Group of the RSDLP". Some St. Petersburg social democrats were unhappy with that split and created an alternative organization that would, they hoped, eventually unite all fragments of revolutionary social democracy in Russia. The only exception that they made was for the Mensheviks who were concentrating on legal forms of oppositionist activity at the expense of revolutionary activities.

=== Formation ===
The Mezhraiontsy group was founded in November 1913 by three Bolsheviks (Konstantin Yurenev, A. M. Novosyolov and E. M. Adamovich) and one Menshevik (N. M. Yegorov). Yurenev was the informal leader of the organization until May 1917 except for one year between February 1915 and February 1916, which he spent in jail on charges of subversive activities.

Members occupied a centrist position between Bolsheviks and Mensheviks.

=== Growth during war ===
At the outbreak of World War I in July–August 1914 and the subsequent change of St. Petersburg's name to "Petrograd", the faction lines within the RSDLP were drastically redrawn over the issue of support for the war. Those who supported the war were called "Defensists", and those who were opposed to it were called "Defeatists". Most members of the Mezhraionka, as well as Lenin and some Mensheviks, adopted an anti-war position, and by late 1915, the organization had 60-80 members. Growing popular disillusionment with the war caused, by the time the February Revolution of 1917 broke out, the organization to have 400-500 members.

=== 1917 Revolution ===
Mezhraionka members were active in Petrograd during the revolution by seizing a printing plant and publishing the first leaflet calling for an armed uprising on February 27 O.S. After the formation of the Petrograd Soviet later that night, the Mezhraionka was given one seat in its Presidium, as opposed to the two seats allocated to each nationwide socialist party like the Bolsheviks, Mensheviks and Socialist Revolutionary Party.

Although the Mezhraionka's original goal was to unite all Bolsheviks and Mensheviks in one party, the divisions over Russia's participation in the war proved to be too deep. On April 12, 1917, the Mezhraionka refused to participate in a Menshevik-sponsored unification conference because it would be dominated by the Defensist wing of the Mensheviks. From that point onward, their positions began to converge with the Bolshevik positions, which were becoming more radical after Lenin's return from abroad.

=== Merger with Bolsheviks ===
With the return of many anti-war social democratic émigrés from European exile in April to June 1917, the Mezhraionka was a natural place for them to join. A number of prominent social democrats like Leon Trotsky, Adolf Joffe, Anatoly Lunacharsky, Moisei Uritsky, David Riazanov, V. Volodarsky, Lev Karakhan, Dmitry Manuilsky and Sergey Ezhov (Tsederbaum) joined it at that time. At the elections to the Petrograd district councils in May–June 1917, the IDO and Bolsheviks formed a bloc.

The Mezhraionka, with about 4,000 members, merged with the Bolsheviks at the 6th Congress of the RSDLP in late July to early August 1917 in which both groups formed a party that was formally independent of the Mensheviks. Many of its former members played an important role during the October Revolution later in the year and the subsequent Russian Civil War.

== Journal ==
The group published a journal of its own, Vperyod. One number was put out illegally in 1915, and publication was resumed in 1917, when it came out legally from June to August as the organ of the St. Petersburg Inter-District Committee of the United Social-Democrats (Internationalists). Eight issues were put out. After the Sixth Congress of the Party the editorial board was changed, and No. 9 of the journal appeared as the organ of the Central Committee of the RSDLP(b). Publication was discontinued in September 1917 by decision of the Central Committee.

== See also ==
- Factions of the Russian Social Democratic Labour Party

== Sources ==
- Miller, Viktor Iosifovich."Konstantin Konstantinovich Yurenev," In Alʹbert Pavlovich Nenarokov (Ed.), Revvoensovet Respubliki: 6 sentiabria 1918 g.-28 avgusta 1923 g. Moscow: Politizdat, 1991.
- Yurenev, Konstantin K. "Mezhraioka (1911-1917 gg.)" in Proletarskaya Revolyutsiya, 1924, No. 1 and 2.
