= Factions of the Russian Social Democratic Labour Party =

In the course of the history of the Russian Social Democratic Labour Party (RSDLP between 1898 and 1918), several political factions developed, as well as the major split between the Bolsheviks and the Mensheviks.

== Bolsheviks and Mensheviks ==
Formed in 1903 from the major split in the RSDLP—which also produced the Mensheviks—the Bolshevik faction followed Vladimir Lenin, and organised a separate party, the Russian Social Democratic Workers Party, aka Russian Social Democratic Labour Party (Bolsheviks), in 1912. After the October Revolution of November 1917 it became the Russian Communist Party (Bolsheviks).

Formed from the 1903 split with the Bolsheviks, the Mensheviks followed Julius Martov. With the formal severing of ties in 1912, the Mensheviks used the name Russian Social Democratic Party (Mensheviks), or sometimes without the qualifier. At the outbreak of World War I in 1914, the majority supporting the war ("Defencists") maintained control of the RSDLP(M) under Fyodor Dan and others, while those opposed to the war left as the Menshevik Internationalists under Martov.

== Borba ==
Also known as "the Struggle", Borba was an expatriate group based in Paris from 1901 to 1903.

== Jewish Labour Bund ==
This faction had an autonomous statute inside the RSDLP between the first congress in Minsk in March 1898 and the second congress in Brussels and London in August 1903, and again from the Fourth (Unification) Congress in Stockholm in April 1906.

== Liquidators ==
The Liquidationists were a faction of the Mensheviks who left in 1905 (plus their ideological compatriots who remained), maintaining that with the availability of legal participation in political life, the underground revolutionary party must be liquidated.

== RSDLP Internationalists ==
The Internationalists (1917–1919) was a programme of the group that was largely similar to that of the Menshevik-Internationalists, and politically it positioned itself between the Menshevik-Internationalists and the Bolsheviks. The faction merged with the Bolsheviks in 1919.

== Menshevik-Internationalists ==
The Menshevik-Internationalists who opposed involvement of Russian socialists in the war effort; they split from the Mensheviks in 1914 under that faction's founder, Martov. The Menshevik-Internationalists eventually merged with Mezhraiontsy, which merged with the Bolsheviks in 1917.

== Mezhraiontsy ==
Formed in 1913 by Konstantin Yurenev to attempt to bridge the divide between the Bolsheviks and the Mensheviks, but eventually merged in 1917 with the Bolsheviks.

== Otzovists ==
The Otzovists (Recallists; 1907–1909) were a group of radical Bolsheviks who demanded to cease all participation of the RSDLP in legal state establishments, in particular, to recall the RSDLP representatives from the State Duma, hence the name ("to recall" is otozvat in Russian). Among the prominent Otzovists were Alexander Bogdanov, Mikhail Pokrovsky, Anatoly Lunacharsky, and Andrei Bubnov. The debates among Bolsheviks whether to boycott the new constituency of the Russian parliament known as the Third Duma started after the defeat of the revolution in mid-1907 and the adoption of a new, highly restrictive election law. This faction subsequently organised itself in the Vpered group from 1909.

== Ultimatists ==
The Ultimatists (1907–1909) were a radical faction of Bolsheviks that demanded that an ultimatum must be sent to Bolshevik deputies of the 3rd State Duma (elected in 1907) demanding that they be uncompromisingly radical. While Lenin sided with them twice (according to Julius Martov's History), he eventually denounced them, dubbing them "liquidators inside out". Ultimatists controlled the St. Petersburg Bolshevik organization until September 1909.

== Yedinstvo ==
Yedinstvo ("Unity", 1914–1918) comprised associates and followers of Georgi Plekhanov.

== Yuzhny Rabochy ==
Yuzhny Rabochy ("Southern Worker"; 1899-1903) opposed the Iskra programme of building a centralised party.

== Vpered ==
Vpered (1909–1912) was a left-communist faction of ex-Bolsheviks.
