= Proletary =

Underground Bolshevik newspaper published between 1906 and 1909

Proletary (The Proletarian) was an illegal Russian Bolshevik newspaper edited by Lenin; it was published from September 3, 1906, until December 11, 1909. A total of fifty issues having appeared. Active participants in the editorial work were Mikhail Vladimirsky, V. V. Vorovsky, I. F. Dubrovinsky, Anatoly Lunacharsky. Alexander Bogdanov had originally been on the editorial board, but he resigned, being replaced by Virgil Shantser on 13 August 1908. The technical side of publication was in the hands of Alexander Schlichter, E. S. Schlichter and others. The first twenty issues of the paper were edited and set up in Vyborg (matrices were sent to St. Petersburg and the paper was printed there; for purposes of concealment the newspaper was date-lined Moscow). Later, in view of growing difficulties in the way of publishing an illegal newspaper in Russia, the St. Petersburg and Moscow Committees of the Russian Social Democratic Labour Party decided that publication of the newspaper should be organised abroad. Nos. 21 to 40 were published in Geneva and Nos. 41 to 50 in Paris.

Nos. 1 and 2 of Proletary appeared as the organ of the Moscow and St. Petersburg Committees of the R.S.D.L.P.; Nos. 3 and 4 as the organ of the Moscow, St. Petersburg and Moscow District Committees of the R.S.D.L.P.; Nos. 5 to 11 as the organ of the Moscow, St. Petersburg, Moscow District, Perm and Kursk Committees of the R.S.D.L.P.; Nos. 12 to 20 as the organ of the Moscow, St. Petersburg, Moscow District, Perm, Kursk and Kazan Committees of the R.S.D.L.P.; from No. 21 onwards (from the time it moved abroad) it appeared as the organ of the Moscow and St. Petersburg Committees of the R.S.D.L.P.

In practice, Proletary functioned as the organ of the Bolshevik Centre. The main editorial work was done by Lenin, with most issues carrying articles by him (over a hundred in all) on questions of the revolutionary struggle of the working class. The newspaper gave prominence to questions of tactics and general politics; it published reports on the activities of the Central Committee of the R.S.D.L.P., the decisions of conferences and plenary meetings of the C.C., R.S.D.L.P., letters from the C.C. on various questions of Party work, and other documents. No. 46 published a supplement containing a notice of the extended meeting of the editorial board of Proletary held in Paris between June 21 and June 30, 1909, and also the resolutions of that meeting. The newspaper maintained close contact with local Party organisations.

During the years of the Stolypin reaction, the newspaper played an important part in preserving and strengthening Lenin's control of the Bolshevik organisations. He succeeded in his struggle against the liquidators. At the plenary meeting of the C.C., R.S.D.L.P. in January 1910, the Mensheviks succeeded, with the aid of the conciliators, in passing a resolution to close the newspaper Proletary.
