= Bolshevik Nuclei =

Political group in Senegal

Bolshevik Nuclei (in French: Noyau-Bolshevik) was a small clandestine Marxist group in Senegal. It published Ferment. At the time of the 1988 elections it promoted abstention.
