= Yedinstvo =

Yedinstvo Единство
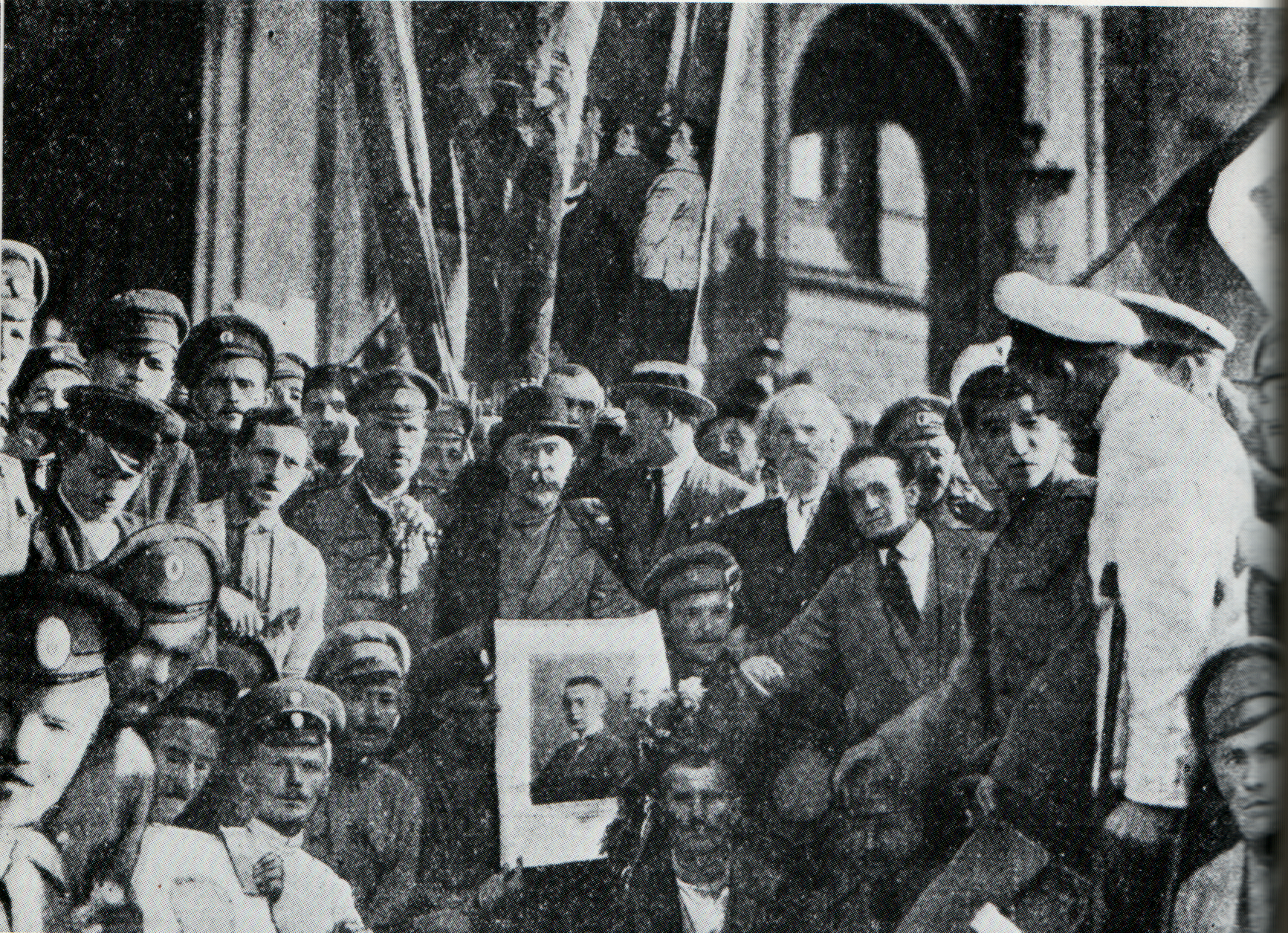
- Deutsch and Plekhanov amongst a group of supporters whilst demonstrating in Petrograd in favour of the Kerensky offensive, 1917
- Leader: Georgi Plekhanov
- Founders: Leo Deutsch; Plekhanov; Vera Zasulich
- Founded: 1914
- Legalised: 1917
- Banned: 1918
- Split from: RSDLP
- Preceded by: Pro-party Mensheviks
- Newspaper: Yedinstvo
- Ideology: Marxism
- Political position: Defensism
- National affiliation: RSDLP (1914-1917)
- International affiliation: Second International

Yedinstvo or Edinstvo (Russian: Единство, IPA: [jɪˈdʲinstvə], "Unity") was a faction within the Russian Social Democratic Labor Party (RSDLP) between 1914 and 1917 and then a small independent party in 1917 and 1918. It was led by Georgi Plekhanov.

== Background ==
Plekhanov was a prominent Russian Marxist theoretician and journalist who lived in exile in Europe from the early 1880s until 1917. Although he was revered by Russian social democrats as the founding father of Russian Marxism, post-1900 he was gradually eclipsed within the RSDLP by younger leaders like Julius Martov, Vladimir Lenin, Alexander Bogdanov, and others. In the immediate aftermath of the split between Lenin's Bolsheviks and Martov's Mensheviks in August 1903, Plekhanov first sided with Lenin, but in late 1903 he went over to the Mensheviks. When the Bolsheviks and the Mensheviks further split in the wake of the Russian Revolution of 1905, Plekhanov formed a small faction within the Mensheviks known as "Party Mensheviks" (sometimes translated as "Pro-party Mensheviks"). He was critical of both the Bolsheviks and of most Mensheviks, whom he saw as concentrating on legal oppositionist work in Russia at the expense of revolutionary activities, using his newspaper, Dnevnik sotsialdemokrata (Diary of a Social Democrat), as a platform

== Creation of Yedinstvo ==
In 1912 the RSDLP formally split into Lenin's supporters on the one hand and a coalition of Mensheviks, Leon Trotsky's supporters and ethno-national social democratic groups (Jewish Bund, Polish Social Democratic Party, Latvian Social Democratic Workers Party) on the other hand. Plekhanov and some other social democrats refused to join either side. With the split becoming deeper in 1913 (e.g. the social democratic faction in the State Duma split in September 1913), those who didn't join either side began forming their own organizations, e.g. the Mezhraiontsy group was formed in November 1913. In early 1914, Plekhanov followed suit and formed his own group, Yedinstvo (Unity), with his old friends and followers Vera Zasulich and Leo Deutsch The group was founded abroad, but its supporters became active in Russia proper as early as the spring of 1914 and published 4 issues of the newspaper Yedinstvo in St. Petersburg in May and June 1914.

== World War I ==
With the outbreak of World War I in August 1914, Russian social democrats became split over the issue of supporting the Tsarist government, which they were normally irreconcilably opposed to, during a time of war. Plekhanov adopted a position on the extreme patriotic end of the social democratic opinion spectrum, known as "Defensism", supporting the Russian government for the duration of the war. His approach was adopted by the rest of the Yedinstvo leadership.

== 1917 Revolution ==
After the fall of the Romanov dynasty during the February Revolution of 1917 Yedinstvo became a legally functioning political group. On March 29, 1917, it resumed publication of its newspaper, Yedinstvo, in Petrograd. This time it was a daily and was first edited by Nikolai Iordansky. Plekhanov took over the newspaper upon his return to Russia on March 31, 1917, and editorial board members included Zasulich, Deutsch, and Grigory Aleksinsky. Although Plekhanov received a hero's welcome in Russia, the group remained small and its influence very limited.

Plekhanov and Yedinstvo were staunch supporters of the Russian Provisional Government and favored Russia's continued participation in the war. They were adamantly opposed to the anti-war Bolsheviks and kept their distance from the Mensheviks, who were split on the issues of war and support for the Provisional Government. Yedinstvo refused to merge with the Mensheviks at the latter's Unification Congress in August 1917, at which point the group effectively became an independent party. It fielded its own candidates in the Russian Constituent Assembly elections on November 12, 1917 O.S. and received 25,000 votes according to a partial count of 54 constiencies out of 74.

In the meantime, the Bolsheviks had seized power during the October Revolution and Yedinstvo's newspaper had closed down due to its limited readership in November 1917. By that time Plekhanov was seriously ill and although the newspaper was resumed as Nashe Yedinstvo (Our Unity) in December 1917 (it lasted until January 1918), the party slowly declined in the early months of 1918. Plekhanov died of tuberculosis in Finland in May 1918 and the party was finally suppressed by the Bolsheviks in June–July 1918 along with other socialist parties.

== See also ==
- Factions of the Russian Social Democratic Labour Party
