= Soviet Revolutionary Communists (Bolsheviks) =

Soviet Revolutionary Communists (Bolsheviks) Советских революционных коммунистов (большевиков)
- Ideology: Communism; Marxism–Leninism; Stalinism; Anti-revisionism

Soviet Revolutionary Communists (Bolsheviks) was an early anti-revisionist movement claimed to be an underground political outfit in the Soviet Union which criticized the leadership of Nikita Khrushchev as revisionist. It upheld the legacy of Joseph Stalin and accused the post-Stalin Soviet leadership of deviating from the socialist path. It represented the line taken by the People's Republic of China and People's Republic of Albania after the Sino-Soviet Split. Little is known about the group.

== Programme document ==
A programmatic document of the group was released in connection with the 1966 congress of the Party of Labour of Albania. It was moreover claimed that the document had been distributed clandestinely amongst communists in the Soviet Union. The document harshly criticized the wealthy lifestyles of the upper sections of the Soviet bureaucracy, argued that such lifestyles were in contradiction to socialism.

The first known English-language edition of the document was released in Albania at this point. In the beginning of 1967 a French language translation was published through French and Belgian leftwing publications. In the same year a Swedish language edition was published by KFML, with a preface by Nils Holmberg.

== Possible Albanian hoax ==
Since the only information about the group comes from contemporary official Albanian sources, there has been speculation about whether the group actually existed or was simply a fictional construct of the Albanian Party. In any case, the existence of 'Revolutionary Communists' within the Soviet Union was used in the Albanian rhetoric to claim legitimacy for their position within the international communist movement, i.e. that they represented the original Bolshevik line of Lenin and Stalin.

== Possible Involvement of Molotov ==
At the time the programme document began circulating in Western Europe, a general assumption amongst its Western distributors was that the group had been formed around the former Soviet Minister of Foreign Affairs, V.M. Molotov. This assumption was based on a study of the language used in the text and direct references to Molotov and his associates in inner party struggles. Molotov had been expelled from the CPSU after the takeover by Khrushchev.

== See also ==
- Bibliography of the Post Stalinist Soviet Union
- Government of the Soviet Union
- Politics of the Soviet Union
- Anti-party group
