= Burkinabé Bolshevik Party =

- Leader: Hassane Dicko
- Founded: Unknown
- Dissolved: Unknown
- Ideology: Communism; Marxism-Leninism
- Political position: Left-wing

Burkinabe Bolshevik Party (French: Parti Bolchévique Burkinabè, PBB) was a Marxist-Leninist party in Burkina Faso registered in 1991. It was led by Hassane Dicko.
