= Shiklovo =

Shiklovo Шиклово
- Village
- Location within Vladimir Oblast Location within Russia
- Coordinates: 56°18′N 38°38′E
- Country: Russia
- Region: Vladimir Oblast
- District: Alexandrovsky District
- Time zone: UTC+3:00

Shiklovo (Russian: Шиклово) is a rural locality (a village) in Karinskoye Rural Settlement, Alexandrovsky District, Vladimir Oblast, Russia. The population was 5 as of 2010. There are 2 streets.

== Geography ==
Shiklovo is located 16 km south of Alexandrov (the district's administrative centre) by road. Korovino is the nearest rural locality.
