= Borba (Paris) =

Borba (Russian for 'Struggle') was a group of left-wing Russian writers residing abroad, which considered itself part of the Russian Social Democratic Labour Party; it took shape as an independent group in Paris in 1901. Since it departed from Social-Democratic views and tactics, engaged in disorganising activities, and had no contacts with Social-Democratic organisations in Russia, the group was not allowed representation at the Second Party Congress. It was dissolved by decision of that Congress.
