= Dyelo Naroda =

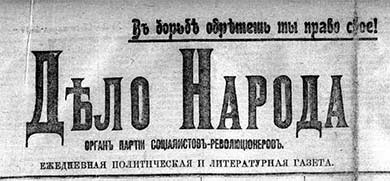
Newspaper's logo, using the pre-reform spelling with the letter yat ("Ѣ").

Dyelo Naroda (Russian: Дело Народа) was a daily newspaper from 1917 to 1919. It was written by the Centrist group of the Socialist Revolutionary Party. It was published in Petrograd from. In June 1917, it had become the organ of the Central Committee of the Socialist Revolutionary Party. The paper supported the Provisional Government, and Kerensky was one of its contributors.

The paper was closed in July, 1918, but opened in October in Samara in 1918, which was captured by the Whiteguard Czechs and Socialists Revolutionary rebels, and in March 1919 in Moscow, after which the paper was closed down for refusing to stop agitating for the overthrow of the Bolshevik government.
