= Bolshevik Centre =

The Bolshevik Centre was a select group of Bolsheviks that led the organization in secret. The Centre conducted its activities in secret in part so as to avoid the prohibition by the Russian Social Democratic Labour Party ("RSDLP") on separate committees outside of the RSDLP.

The Bolshevik Centre emerged from the group that ran the newspaper Proletarian. It was initially charged with the collection and disbursement of the funds for revolutionary propaganda. It operated illegally after the RSDLP dissolved it through a Central Committee joint plenum decision made in February 1910.

The Bolshevik Centre was headed by a "Finance Group" consisting of Vladimir Lenin, Leonid Krasin and Alexander Bogdanov. Other members included Viktor Taratuta, Lev Kamenev, Virgil Shantser, Grigory Zinoviev, and V.A. Desnitsky. The group was involved in the attempt to unify the Party funds in a wider move to consolidate the Bolsheviks. An account stated that Lenin dominated this group through his connivance with Taratuta, Manev, and Zinoviev. There were instances, however, when the Bolshevik Centre contradicted Lenin. This was demonstrated in its actions concerning the newspapers Proletarian, Pravda, and the creation of a St. Petersburg newspaper.
