= Borba (surname) =

- George Borba, Giorgio Borba,(جورج بوربا, ג'ורג' בורבה. (born in 1944 in Italy ), former Israeli international footballer
- Emilinha Borba, (born August 31, 1923, in Rio de Janeiro; † October 3, 2005 ) was a Brazilian singer and actress
- Rivaldo Vítor Borba Ferreira (born 19 April 1972 in Paulista, Pernambuco ), commonly known as simply Rivaldo, is a Brazilian footballer
- Heloísa Borba Gonçalves (born 13 March 1950 in Porto Alegre, Rio Grande do Sul), Brazilian suspected serial killer and fugitive
- Silvio Luiz Borba da Silva - Kuki (footballer)
