= Bolsheviks =

Faction of the Russian Social Democratic Labour Party

Bolsheviks Большевики
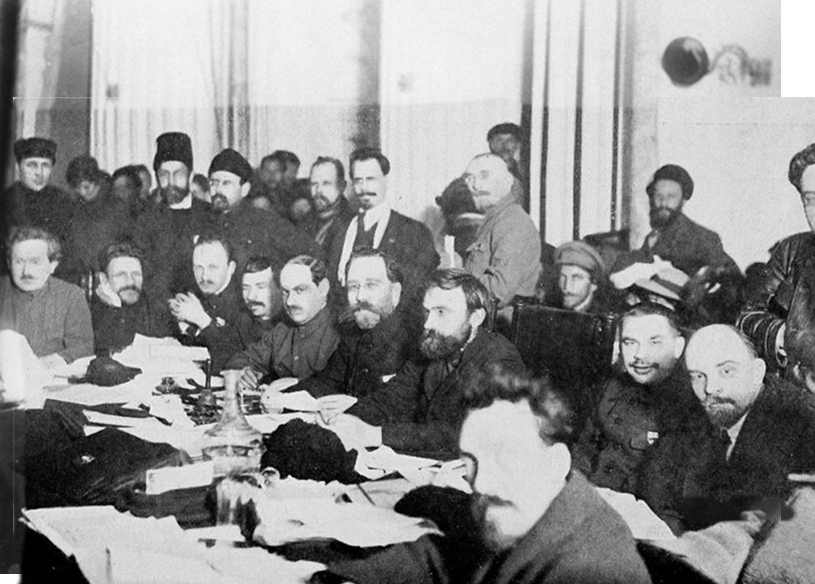
- Bolshevik Party meeting, 1920: sitting (from left to right) are Yenukidze, Kalinin, Bukharin, Tomsky, Lashevich, Kamenev, Preobrazhensky, Serebryakov, Lenin, and Rykov in front.
- Founder: Vladimir Lenin
- Founded: 1903; 123 years ago
- Dissolved: 1912; 114 years ago
- Succeeded by: RSDLP (Bolsheviks)
- Newspaper: Pravda
- Ideology: Marxism; Leninism; Bolshevism; Revolutionary socialism
- Political position: Far-left
- National affiliation: Russian Social Democratic Labour Party

The Bolsheviks, (Note: English: /ˈbɒlʃəvɪks/, US also /ˈboʊlʃəvɪks/; Russian: большевики, romanized: bol'sheviki IPA: [bəlʲʂɨvʲɪˈkʲi]; from большинство bol'shinstvo [bəlʲʂɨnstˈvo] 'majority') led by Vladimir Lenin, were a radical faction of the Marxist Russian Social Democratic Labour Party (RSDLP) which split with the Mensheviks at the Second Party Congress in 1903. The Bolshevik party, formally established in 1912, seized power in Russia in the October Revolution of 1917 and was later renamed the Russian Communist Party, All-Union Communist Party, and ultimately the Communist Party of the Soviet Union. Its ideology, based on Leninist and later Marxist–Leninist principles, became known as Bolshevism.

The origin of the RSDLP split was Lenin's support for a smaller party of professional revolutionaries, as opposed to the Menshevik desire for a broad party membership. The influence of the factions fluctuated in the years up to 1912, when the RSDLP formally split in two. The political philosophy of the Bolsheviks was based on the Leninist principles of vanguardism and democratic centralism. Lenin was also more willing to use illegal means such as robbery to fund the party's activities. By 1917, influenced by the experiences of World War I, he reached the conclusion that the chain of world capitalism could "break at its weakest link" in Russia before it assumed the level of the advanced countries, opposing theorists such as Georgi Plekhanov. Lenin had also come to view poorer peasants as potential allies of the relatively small Russian proletariat.

After the February Revolution of 1917, Lenin returned to Russia and issued his April Theses, which called for "no support for the Provisional Government" and "all power to the soviets." During the summer of 1917, which saw events including the July Days and Kornilov affair, large numbers of radicalized workers joined the Bolsheviks, which planned the October Revolution that overthrew the government. The Bolsheviks initially governed in coalition with the Left Socialist-Revolutionaries, but increasingly centralized power and suppressed opposition during the Russian Civil War. After 1921, it became the sole legal party in Soviet Russia and the Soviet Union. Under Joseph Stalin's leadership, Bolshevism became linked to his policies of "socialism in one country," rapid industrialization, collectivized agriculture, and centralized state control.

== History of the split ==
=== Vladimir Lenin's ideology in What Is to Be Done? ===
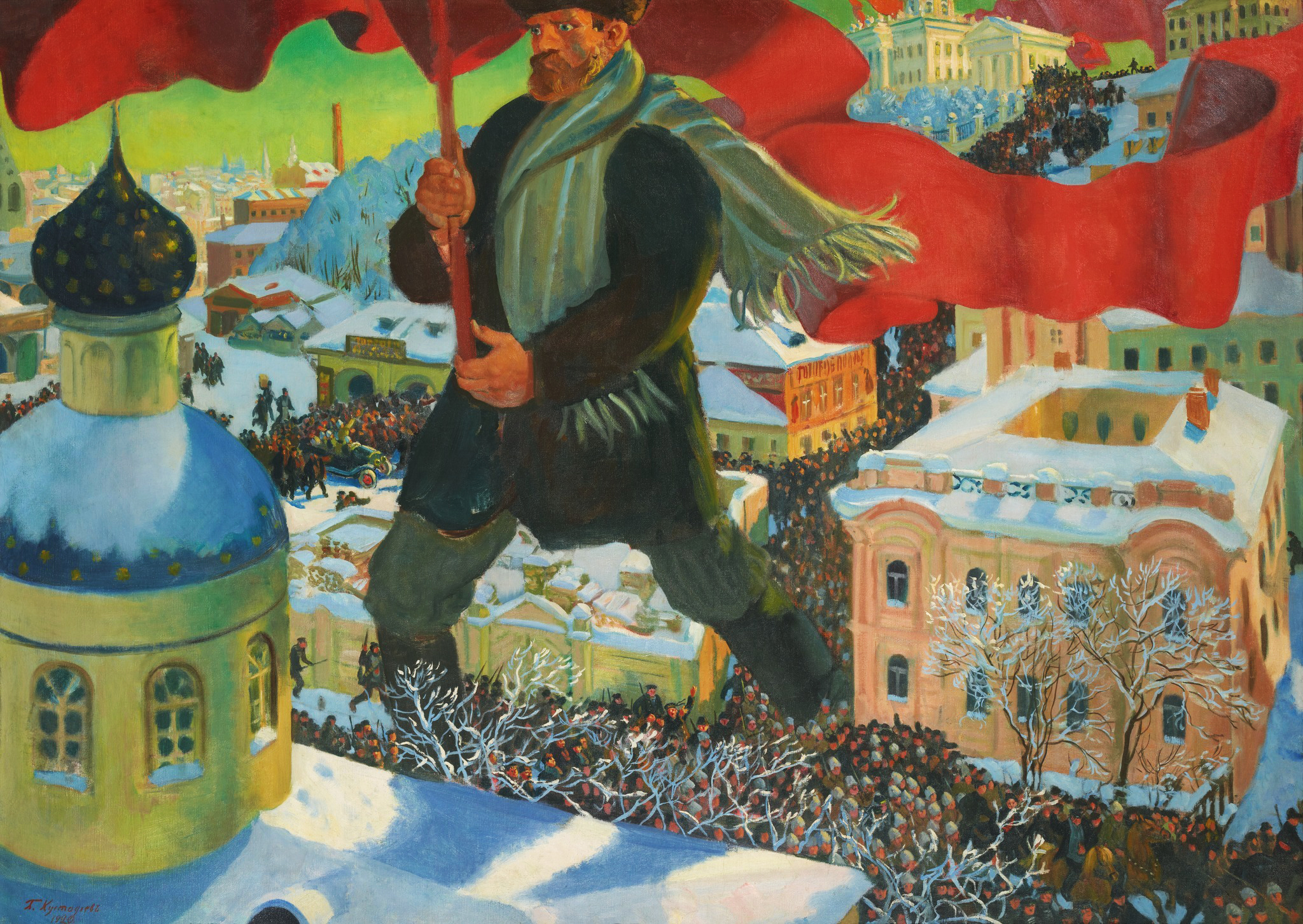
Bolshevik, Boris Kustodiev, 1920

Lenin's political pamphlet What Is to Be Done?, written in 1901, helped to precipitate the Bolsheviks' split from the Mensheviks. In Germany, the book was published in 1902, but in Russia, strict censorship outlawed its publication and distribution. One of the main points of Lenin's writing was that a revolution can only be achieved by a strong, professional leadership with deep dedication to Marxist theoretical principles and an organization that spanned through the whole of Russia, abandoning what Lenin called "artisanal work" towards a more organized revolutionary work. After the proposed revolution had successfully overthrown the Russian autocracy, this strong leadership would relinquish power and allow a socialist party to fully develop within the principles of democratic centralism. Lenin said that if professional revolutionaries did not maintain influence over the fight of the workers, then that fight would steer away from the party's objective and carry on under the influence of opposing beliefs or even away from revolution entirely.

The pamphlet also showed that Lenin's view of a socialist intelligentsia was in line with Marxist theory. For example, Lenin agreed with the Marxist ideal of social classes ceasing to be and for the eventual "withering away of the state". Most party members considered unequal treatment of workers immoral and were loyal to the idea of a completely classless society. This pamphlet also showed that Lenin opposed another group of reformers, known as "Economists", who were for economic reform while leaving the government relatively unchanged and who, in Lenin's view, failed to recognize the importance of uniting the working population behind the party's cause.

=== Second Party Congress ===
At the 2nd Congress of the RSDLP, which was held in Brussels and then London during August 1903, Lenin and Julius Martov disagreed over the party membership rules. Lenin, who was supported by Georgi Plekhanov, wanted to limit membership to those who supported the party full-time and worked in complete obedience to the elected party leadership. Martov wanted to extend membership to anyone "who recognises the Party Programme and supports it by material means and by regular personal assistance under the direction of one of the party's organisations." Lenin believed his plan would develop a core group of professional revolutionaries who would devote their full time and energy towards developing the party into an organization capable of leading a successful proletarian revolution against the Tsarist autocracy.

The base of active and experienced members would be the recruiting ground for this professional core. Sympathizers would be left outside and the party would be organised based on the concept of democratic centralism. Martov, until then a close friend of Lenin, agreed with him that the core of the party should consist of professional revolutionaries, but he argued that party membership should be open to sympathizers, revolutionary workers, and other fellow travellers. The two had disagreed on the issue as early as March–May 1903, but it was not until the Congress that their differences became irreconcilable and split the party. At first, the disagreement appeared to be minor and inspired by personal conflicts. For example, Lenin's insistence on dropping less active editorial board members from Iskra or Martov's support for the Organizing Committee of the Congress which Lenin opposed. The differences grew and the split became irreparable.

Internal unrest also arose over the political structure that was best suited for Soviet power. As discussed in What Is To Be Done?, Lenin firmly believed that a rigid political structure was needed to effectively initiate a formal revolution. This idea was met with opposition from once close allies, including Martov, Plekhanov, Vera Zasulich, Leon Trotsky, and Pavel Axelrod. Plekhanov and Lenin's major dispute arose addressing the topic of nationalizing land or leaving it for private use. Lenin wanted to nationalize to aid in collectivization, whereas Plekhanov thought worker motivation would remain higher if individuals were able to maintain their own property. Those who opposed Lenin and wanted to continue on the socialist mode of production path towards complete socialism and disagreed with his strict party membership guidelines became known as "softs" while Lenin supporters became known as "hards".

Some of the factionalism could be attributed to Lenin's steadfast belief in his own opinion and what was described by Plekhanov as Lenin's inability to "bear opinions which were contrary to his own" and loyalty to his own self-envisioned utopia. Lenin was seen even by fellow party members as being so narrow-minded and unable to accept criticism that he believed that anyone who did not follow him was his enemy. Trotsky, one of Lenin's fellow revolutionaries, compared Lenin in 1904 to the French revolutionary Maximilien Robespierre.

=== Etymology of Bolshevik and Menshevik ===
The two factions of the Russian Social Democratic Labour Party (RSDLP) were originally known as hard (Lenin supporters) and soft (Martov supporters). In the 2nd Congress vote, Lenin's faction won votes on the majority of important issues, and soon came to be known as Bolsheviks – from the Russian boljšinstvó 'majority'. Likewise, Martov's group came to be known as Mensheviks – from menjšinstvó 'minority'. However, Martov's supporters won the vote concerning the question of party membership, and neither Lenin nor Martov had a firm majority throughout the Congress as delegates left or switched sides. In the end, the Congress was evenly split between the two factions.

Starting in 1907, English-language articles sometimes used the term Maximalist for "Bolshevik" and Minimalist for "Menshevik", which proved to be confusing as there was also a "Maximalist" faction within the Russian Socialist Revolutionary Party in 1904–1906 (which, after 1906, formed a separate Union of Socialists-Revolutionaries Maximalists) and then again after 1917.

The Bolsheviks ultimately became the Communist Party of the Soviet Union. (Note: After the split, the Bolshevik party was designated as RSDLP(b) (Russian: РСДРП(б)), where "b" stands for "Bolsheviks". Shortly after coming to power in November 1917, the party changed its name to the Russian Communist Party (Bolsheviks) (РКП(б)) and was generally known as the Communist Party after that point. However, it was not until 1952 that the party formally dropped the word "Bolshevik" from its name. See Congress of the Communist Party of the Soviet Union article for the timeline of name changes.) The Bolsheviks, or Reds, came to power in Russia during the October Revolution phase of the 1917 Russian Revolution, and founded the Russian Soviet Federative Socialist Republic (RSFSR). With the Reds defeating the Whites and others during the Russian Civil War of 1917–1922, the RSFSR became the chief constituent of the Soviet Union (USSR) in December 1922.

=== Demographics of the two factions ===
The average party member was very young: in 1907, 22% of Bolsheviks were under 20 years of age; 37% were 20–24 years of age; and 16% were 25–29 years of age. By 1905, 62% of the members were industrial workers (3% of the population in 1897). Twenty-two percent of Bolsheviks were gentry (1.7% of the total population) and 38% were uprooted peasants; compared with 19% and 26% for the Mensheviks. In 1907, 78% of the Bolsheviks were Russian and 10% were Jewish; compared to 34% and 20% for the Mensheviks. Total Bolshevik membership was 8,400 in 1905, 13,000 in 1906, and 46,100 by 1907; compared to 8,400, 18,000 and 38,200 for the Mensheviks. By 1910, both factions together had fewer than 100,000 members.

=== Beginning of the 1905 Revolution (1903–05) ===
Between 1903 and 1904, the two factions were in a state of flux, with many members changing sides. Plekhanov, the founder of Russian Marxism, who at first allied himself with Lenin and the Bolsheviks, had parted ways with them by 1904. Trotsky at first supported the Mensheviks, but left them in September 1904 over their insistence on an alliance with Russian liberals and their opposition to a reconciliation with Lenin and the Bolsheviks. He remained a self-described "non-factional social democrat" until August 1917, when he joined Lenin and the Bolsheviks, as their positions resembled his and he came to believe that Lenin was correct on the issue of the party.

All but one member of the RSDLP Central Committee were arrested in Moscow in early 1905. The remaining member, with the power of appointing a new committee, was won over by the Bolsheviks. The lines between the Bolsheviks and the Mensheviks hardened in April 1905 when the Bolsheviks held a Bolsheviks-only meeting in London, which they called the 3rd Party Congress. The Mensheviks organised a rival conference and the split was thus finalized.

The Bolsheviks played a relatively minor role in the 1905 Revolution and were a minority in the Saint Petersburg Soviet of Workers' Deputies led by Trotsky. However, the less significant Moscow Soviet was dominated by the Bolsheviks. These Soviets became the model for those formed in 1917.

=== Mensheviks (1906–07) ===
As the Russian Revolution of 1905 progressed, Bolsheviks, Mensheviks, and smaller non-Russian social democratic parties operating within the Russian Empire attempted to reunify at the 4th Congress of the RSDLP held in April 1906 at Folkets hus, Norra Bantorget, in Stockholm. When the Mensheviks made an alliance with the Jewish Bund, the Bolsheviks found themselves in a minority.

However, all factions retained their respective factional structure and the Bolsheviks formed the Bolshevik Centre, the de facto governing body of the Bolshevik faction within the RSDLP. At the 5th Congress held in London in May 1907, the Bolsheviks were in the majority, but the two factions continued functioning mostly independently of each other.

=== Split between Lenin and Bogdanov (1908–10) ===
Tensions had existed between Lenin and Alexander Bogdanov from as early as 1904. Lenin had fallen out with Nikolai Valentinov after Valentinov had introduced him to Ernst Mach's Empiriocriticism, a viewpoint that Bogdanov had been exploring and developing as Empiriomonism. Having worked as co-editor with Plekhanov, on Zarya, Lenin had come to agree with the Valentinov's rejection of Bogdanov's Empiriomonism.

With the defeat of the revolution in mid-1907 and the adoption of a new, highly restrictive election law, the Bolsheviks began debating whether to boycott the new parliament known as the Third Duma. Lenin, Grigory Zinoviev, Lev Kamenev, and others argued for participating in the Duma while Bogdanov, Anatoly Lunacharsky, Mikhail Pokrovsky, and others argued that the social democratic faction in the Duma should be recalled. The latter became known as "recallists" (Russian: otzovists). A smaller group within the Bolshevik faction demanded that the RSDLP Central Committee should give its sometimes unruly Duma faction an ultimatum, demanding complete subordination to all party decisions. This group became known as "ultimatists" and was generally allied with the recallists.

With most Bolshevik leaders either supporting Bogdanov or undecided by mid-1908 when the differences became irreconcilable, Lenin concentrated on undermining Bogdanov's reputation as a philosopher. In 1909, he published a scathing book of criticism entitled Materialism and Empirio-criticism (1909), assaulting Bogdanov's position and accusing him of philosophical idealism. In June 1909, Bogdanov proposed the formation of Party Schools as Proletarian Universities at a Bolshevik mini-conference in Paris organised by the editorial board of the Bolshevik magazine Proletary. However, this proposal was not adopted and Lenin tried to expel Bogdanov from the Bolshevik faction. Bogdanov was then involved with setting up Vpered, which ran the Capri Party School from August to December 1909.

=== Final attempt at party unity (1910) ===
With both Bolsheviks and Mensheviks weakened by splits within their ranks and by Tsarist repression, the two factions were tempted to try to reunite the party. In January 1910, Leninists, recallists, and various Menshevik factions held a meeting of the party's Central Committee in Paris. Kamenev and Zinoviev were dubious about the idea; but under pressure from conciliatory Bolsheviks like Victor Nogin, they were willing to give it a try.

One of the underlying reasons that prevented any reunification of the party was the Russian police. The police were able to infiltrate both parties' inner circles by sending in spies who then reported on the opposing party's intentions and hostilities. This allowed the tensions to remain high between the Bolsheviks and Mensheviks and helped prevent their uniting.

Lenin was firmly opposed to any reunification but was outvoted within the Bolshevik leadership. The meeting reached a tentative agreement, and one of its provisions was to make Trotsky's Vienna-based Pravda, a party-financed central organ. Kamenev, Trotsky's brother-in-law who was with the Bolsheviks, was added to the editorial board; but the unification attempts failed in August 1910 when Kamenev resigned from the board amid mutual recriminations.

=== Forming a separate party (1912) ===
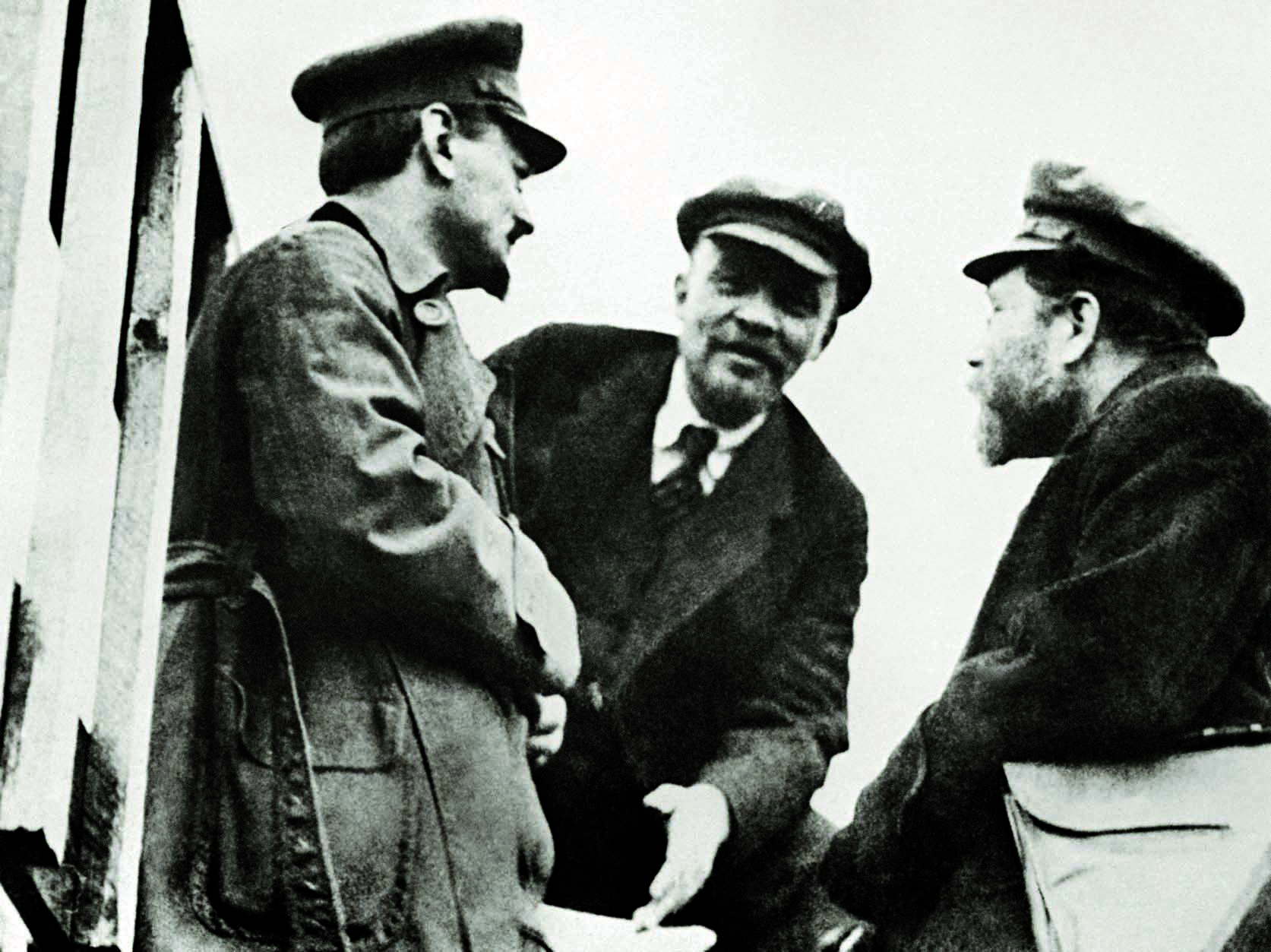
Leon Trotsky, Vladimir Lenin, and Lev Kamenev

The factions permanently broke relations in January 1912 after the Bolsheviks organised a Bolsheviks-only Prague Party Conference and formally expelled Mensheviks and recallists from the party. As a result, they ceased to be a faction in the RSDLP and instead declared themselves an independent party, called Russian Social Democratic Labour Party (Bolsheviks) – or RSDLP(b). Unofficially, the party has been referred to as the Bolshevik Party. Throughout the 20th century, the party adopted a number of different names. In 1918, RSDLP(b) became All-Russian Communist Party (Bolsheviks) and remained so until 1925. From 1925 to 1952, the name was All-Union Communist Party (Bolsheviks) and from 1952 to 1991, the Communist Party of the Soviet Union.

As the party split became permanent, further divisions became evident. One of the most notable differences was how each faction decided to fund its revolution. The Mensheviks decided to fund their revolution through membership dues while Lenin often resorted to more drastic measures since he required a higher budget. One of the common methods the Bolsheviks used was committing bank robberies, one of which, in 1907, resulted in the party getting over 250,000 roubles, which is the equivalent of about $125,000. Bolsheviks were in constant need of money because Lenin practised his beliefs, expressed in his writings, that revolutions must be led by individuals who devote their entire lives to the cause. As compensation, he rewarded them with salaries for their sacrifice and dedication. This measure was taken to help ensure that the revolutionaries stayed focused on their duties and motivated them to perform their jobs. Lenin also used the party money to print and copy pamphlets which were distributed in cities and at political rallies in an attempt to expand their operations. Both factions received funds through donations from wealthy supporters.

The elections to the Russian Constituent Assembly took place in November 1917 in which the Bolsheviks came second with 23.9% of the vote and dissolved the Assembly in January 1918

Further differences in party agendas became evident as the beginning of World War I loomed near. Joseph Stalin was especially eager for the start of the war, hoping that it would turn into a war between classes or essentially a Russian Civil War. This desire for war was fuelled by Lenin's vision that the workers and peasants would resist joining the war effort and therefore be more compelled to join the socialist movement. Through the increase in support, Russia would then be forced to withdraw from the Allied powers in order to resolve her internal conflict. Unfortunately for the Bolsheviks, Lenin's assumptions were incorrect. Despite his and the party's attempts to push for a civil war through involvement in two conferences in 1915 and 1916 in Switzerland, the Bolsheviks were in the minority in calling for a ceasefire by the Imperial Russian Army in World War I.

Although the Bolshevik leadership had decided to form a separate party, convincing pro-Bolshevik workers within Russia to follow suit proved difficult. When the first meeting of the Fourth Duma was convened in late 1912, only one out of six Bolshevik deputies, Matvei Muranov (another one, Roman Malinovsky, was later exposed as an Okhrana agent), voted on 15 December 1912 to break from the Menshevik faction within the Duma. The Bolshevik leadership eventually prevailed, and the Bolsheviks formed their own Duma faction in September 1913.

One final difference between the Bolsheviks and Mensheviks was how ferocious and tenacious the Bolshevik party was in order to achieve its goals, although Lenin was open minded to retreating from political ideals if he saw the guarantee of long-term gains benefiting the party. This practice was seen in the party's trying to recruit peasants and uneducated workers by promising them how glorious life would be after the revolution and granting them temporary concessions.

Bolshevik figures such as Anatoly Lunacharsky, Moisei Uritsky and Dmitry Manuilsky considered that Lenin's influence on the Bolshevik party was decisive but the October insurrection was carried out according to Trotsky's, not to Lenin's plan.

In 1918, the party renamed itself the Russian Communist Party (Bolsheviks) at Lenin's suggestion. In 1925, this was changed to All-Union Communist Party (Bolsheviks). At the 19th Party Congress in 1952 the Party was renamed the Communist Party of the Soviet Union at Stalin's suggestion.

== Usage of the term in other countries ==
- Bangladesh: Maoist Bolshevik Reorganisation Movement of the Purba Banglar Sarbahara Party
- Burkina Faso: Burkinabé Bolshevik Party
- India: Bolshevik Party of India
- India / Sri Lanka: Bolshevik-Leninist Party of India, Ceylon and Burma
- India: Revolutionary Socialist Party (Bolshevik)
- Mexico: Bolshevik Communist Party
- Senegal: Bolshevik Nuclei
- South Africa: Bolsheviks Party of South Africa
- Sri Lanka: Bolshevik Samasamaja Party
- Turkey: Bolshevik Party (North Kurdistan – Turkey)

== Derogatory usage of "Bolshevik" ==
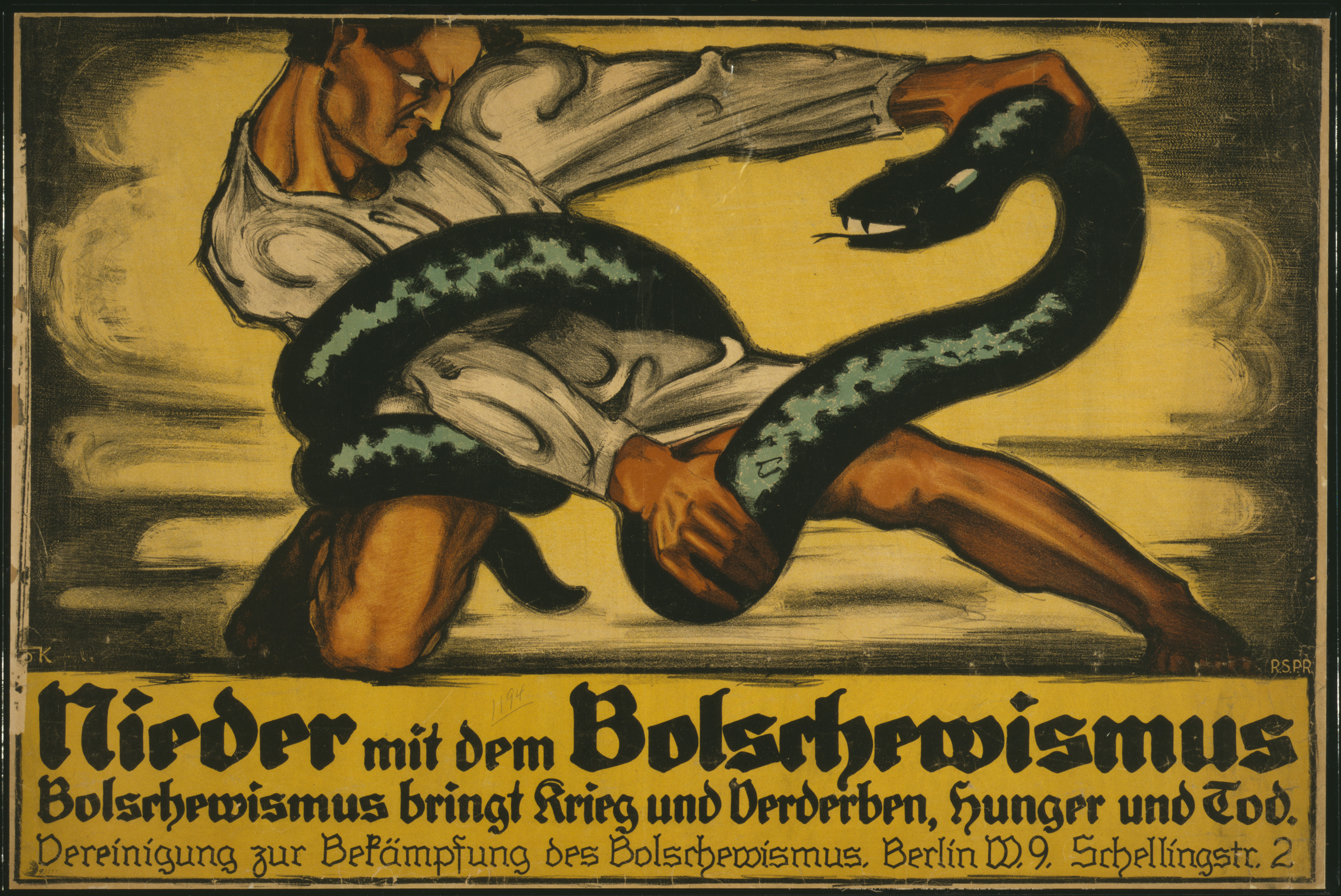
"Down with Bolshevism. Bolshevism brings war and destruction, hunger and death", anti-Bolshevik German propaganda, 1919

Bolo was a derogatory expression for Bolsheviks used by British service personnel in the North Russian Expeditionary Force which intervened against the Red Army during the Russian Civil War. Adolf Hitler, Joseph Goebbels, and other Nazi leaders used it in reference to the worldwide political movement coordinated by the Comintern.

During the Cold War in the United Kingdom, trade union leaders and other leftists were sometimes derisively described as Bolshies. The usage is roughly equivalent to the term "commie", "Red", or "pinko" in the United States during the same period. The term Bolshie later became a slang term for anyone who was rebellious, aggressive, or truculent.

== See also ==
- Left Socialist-Revolutionaries
- Leninism
- Marxism–Leninism
- Old Bolsheviks
- Soviet Revolutionary Communists (Bolsheviks)
- Trotskyism
- Vikzhel negotiations
